= Nieuport 11 =

French WW1 fighter aircraft

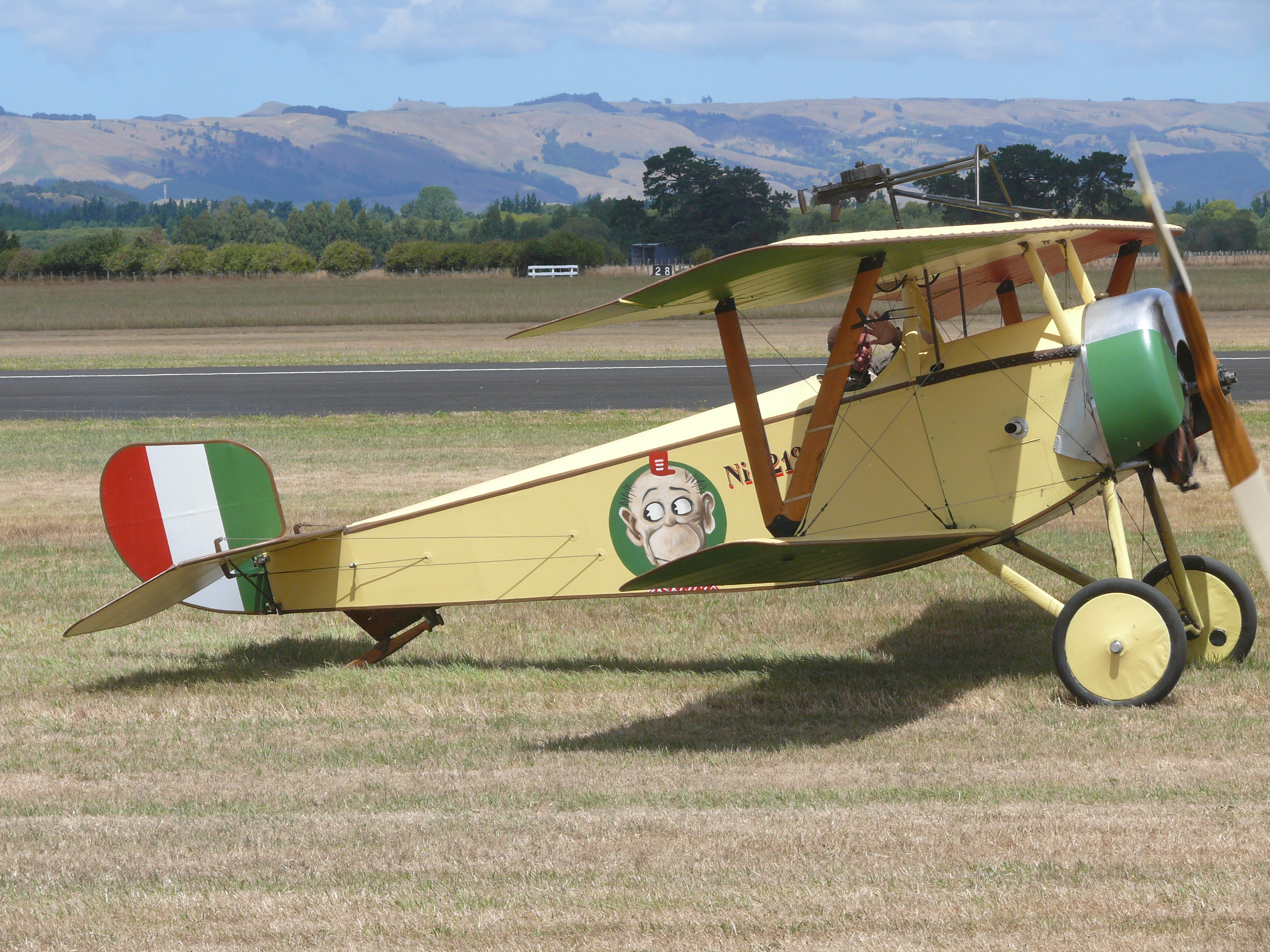
- Replica Nieuport 11 in Italian markings.

General information
- Type: Fighter
- Manufacturer: Nieuport
- Designer: Gustave Delage
- Status: Retired
- Primary users: Aéronautique Militaire (France) Corpo Aeronautico Militare (Italy), Imperial Russian Air Service

History
- Introduction date: 5 January 1916
- Variant: Nieuport 16

The Nieuport 11 (or Nieuport XI C.1 in contemporary sources), nicknamed the Bébé, is a French World War I single seat sesquiplane fighter aircraft, designed by Gustave Delage. It was the primary aircraft that ended the Fokker Scourge in 1916. The type saw service with several of France's allies, and gave rise to the series of "vee-strut" Nieuport fighters that remained in service (latterly as trainers) into the 1920s.

== Design and development ==
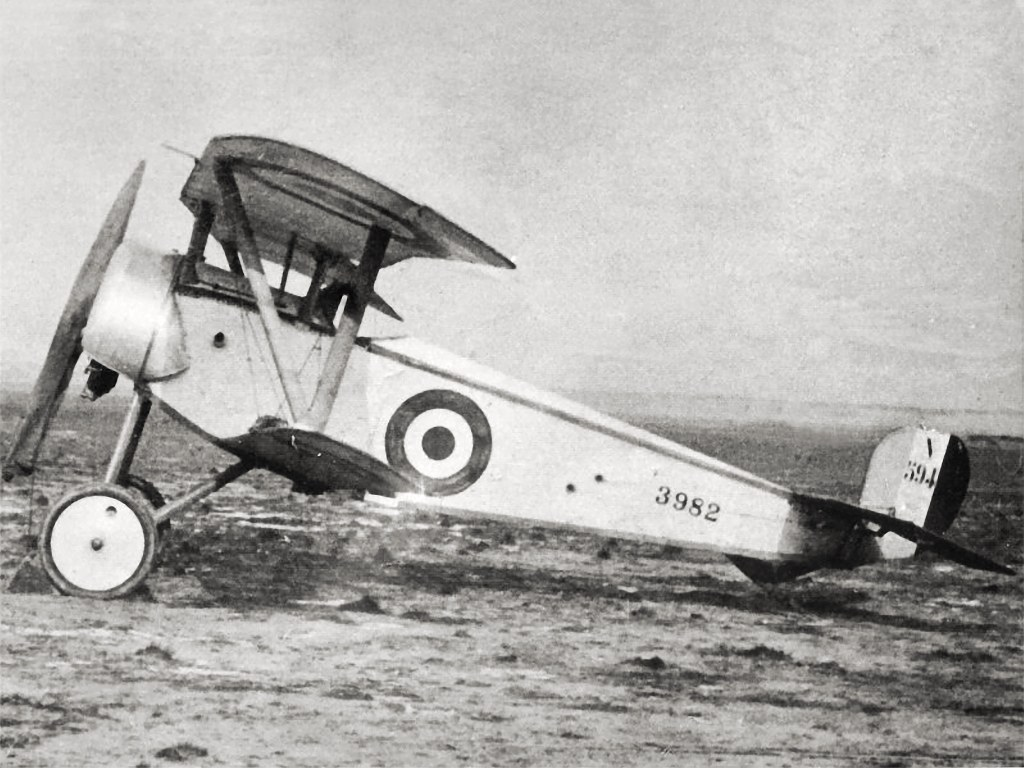
Royal Naval Air Service Nieuport 11

The Nieuport 11 was a new, slightly smaller aircraft based on the general configuration of the Nieuport 10, but designed specifically as a single-seat fighter. Like the "10", the "11" was a sesquiplane, a biplane with a full-sized top wing with two spars, and a lower wing of much narrower chord and a single spar. Interplane struts in the form of a "Vee" joined the upper and lower wings. The sesquiplane layout reduced drag and improved the rate of climb, as well as offering a better view from the cockpit than either biplane or monoplane, while being substantially stronger than contemporary monoplanes. The narrow lower wing could experience aeroelastic flutter, but at air speeds beyond which the Nieuport 11 was capable, and would only become an occasional problem on later much higher powered developments, as well as the German Albatros D.III. Nieuport 11s were supplied to the French Aéronautique Militaire, the British Royal Naval Air Service, the Imperial Russian Air Service, the Belgian Air Force, and Italian Corpo Aeronautico Militare. 646 Nieuport 11s were produced by the Italian Macchi company under licence. After Romania suffered military setbacks, one Nieuport 11, and several Nieuport 12s were transferred from RNAS No.2 Wing as part of the Romanian Flight mission. Additional airplanes received were assembled at Rezerva generală a aviației, however the exact number of Nieuport 11s delivered is unknown.

=== Nieuport 16 ===
In 1916 an improved version appeared as the Nieuport 16, which was a strengthened Nieuport 11 airframe powered by a 110 hp (82 kW) Le Rhône 9J rotary engine. Visible differences included a larger aperture in front of the "horse shoe" cowling and a headrest for the pilot. The Nieuport 16 was an interim type pending the delivery of the slightly larger Nieuport 17 C.1 whose design was begun in parallel with the 16, and remedied the 16's balance problems, as well as further improving performance.

== Operational history ==
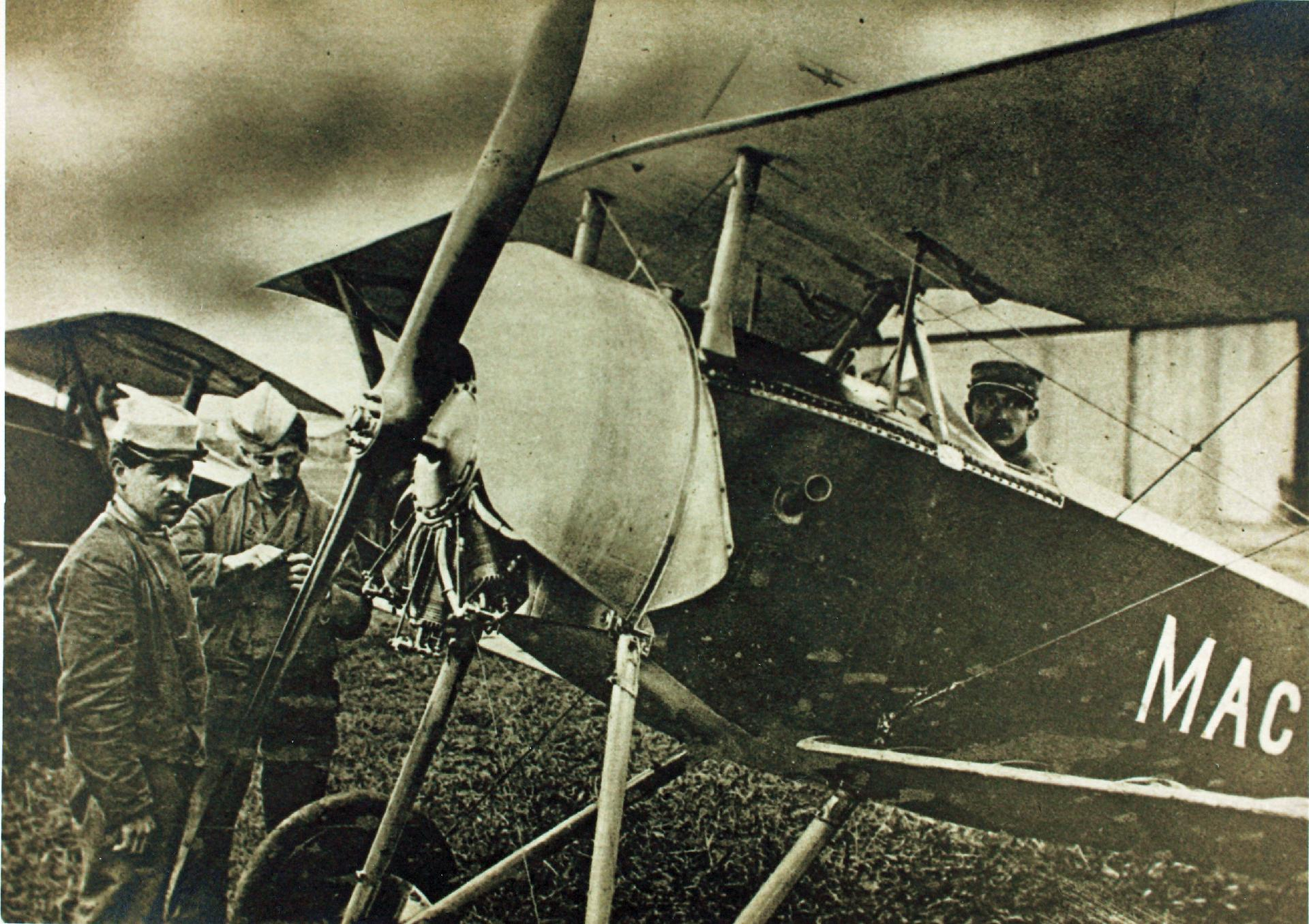
Nieuport 11 of the Escadrille Américaine (later Escadrille Lafayette)

The Nieuport 11 reached the French front in January 1916, and 90 were in service within the month.

This small sesquiplane outclassed the Fokker Eindecker in every respect, including speed, climb rate and maneuverability. It featured ailerons for lateral control rather than the Fokker's wing warping, giving lighter, quicker roll response, and its elevator was attached to a conventional tail plane which provided better pitch control as opposed to the all-moving, balanced "Morane type" elevators of the Fokker.

The Fokker's sole remaining advantage was its synchronized machine gun, which fired forward through the arc of its propeller. At the time, the Allies lacked a similar system, and the Nieuport 11's Lewis machine gun (Note: A few aircraft were at first fitted with Hotchkiss guns and, in Italian service, with the Fiat-Revelli until the Lewis was available in sufficient numbers.) was mounted to fire over the propeller, allowing uninterrupted forward fire. The Lewis was not synchronizable, due to its open bolt firing cycle design which resulted in an unpredictable rate of fire. Clearing gun jams and replacing ammunition drums in flight were challenging though, and the drums limited ammunition supply.

During the course of the Battle of Verdun in February 1916, the combination of the Nieuport 11s technical advantages and its concentration in dedicated fighter units allowed the French to establish air superiority, ending the so-called "Fokker Scourge" and forced radical changes in German tactics. The impact of the Nieuport was so dramatic that in mid to late 1916 several captured examples were repaired, rearmed with a synchronised "Spandau" gun, and flown at the front. Others were supplied by Idflieg to several manufacturers with the request that copies be built, and this had considerable influence on German fighter design.

Some Nieuport 11s and 16s were fitted to fire Le Prieur rockets from the struts for attacks on observation balloons and airships.

By March 1916 the Bébé was being replaced by both the Nieuport 16 and the much improved Nieuport 17, although Italian-built examples remained in first line service longer, as did Russian examples. Thereafter the Nieuport 11s continued to be used as trainers.

== Variants ==
Nieuport 11 C.1
Single-seat fighter/scout biplane. Also known as the Nieuport Bébé or Nieuport Scout although these were used for any Nieuport fighter.
Nieuport-Macchi 11000 or 11.000
Variant built under licence in Italy with some detail modifications.
Nieuport 16 C.1
Improved version powered by a 110 hp (92 kW) Le Rhone 9J rotary piston engine.

== Operators ==
Belgium

- Aviation Militaire Belge
  - 1ère Escadrille de Chasse
  - 5me Escadrille de Chasse
  - 6me Escadrille de Chasse

France

- Aéronautique Militaire
  - Escadrille N.3
  - Escadrille N.12
  - Escadrille N.15
  - Escadrille N.23
  - Escadrille N.26
  - Escadrille N.31
  - Escadrille N.37
  - Escadrille N.38
  - Escadrille N.48
  - Escadrille N.49
  - Escadrille N.57
  - Escadrille N.65
  - Escadrille N.67
  - Escadrille N.68
  - Escadrille N.69
  - Escadrille N.73
  - Escadrille N.92
  - Escadrille N.102
  - Escadrille N.103
  - Escadrille N.112
  - Escadrille N.124
  - Escadrille N.387
  - Escadrille N.391

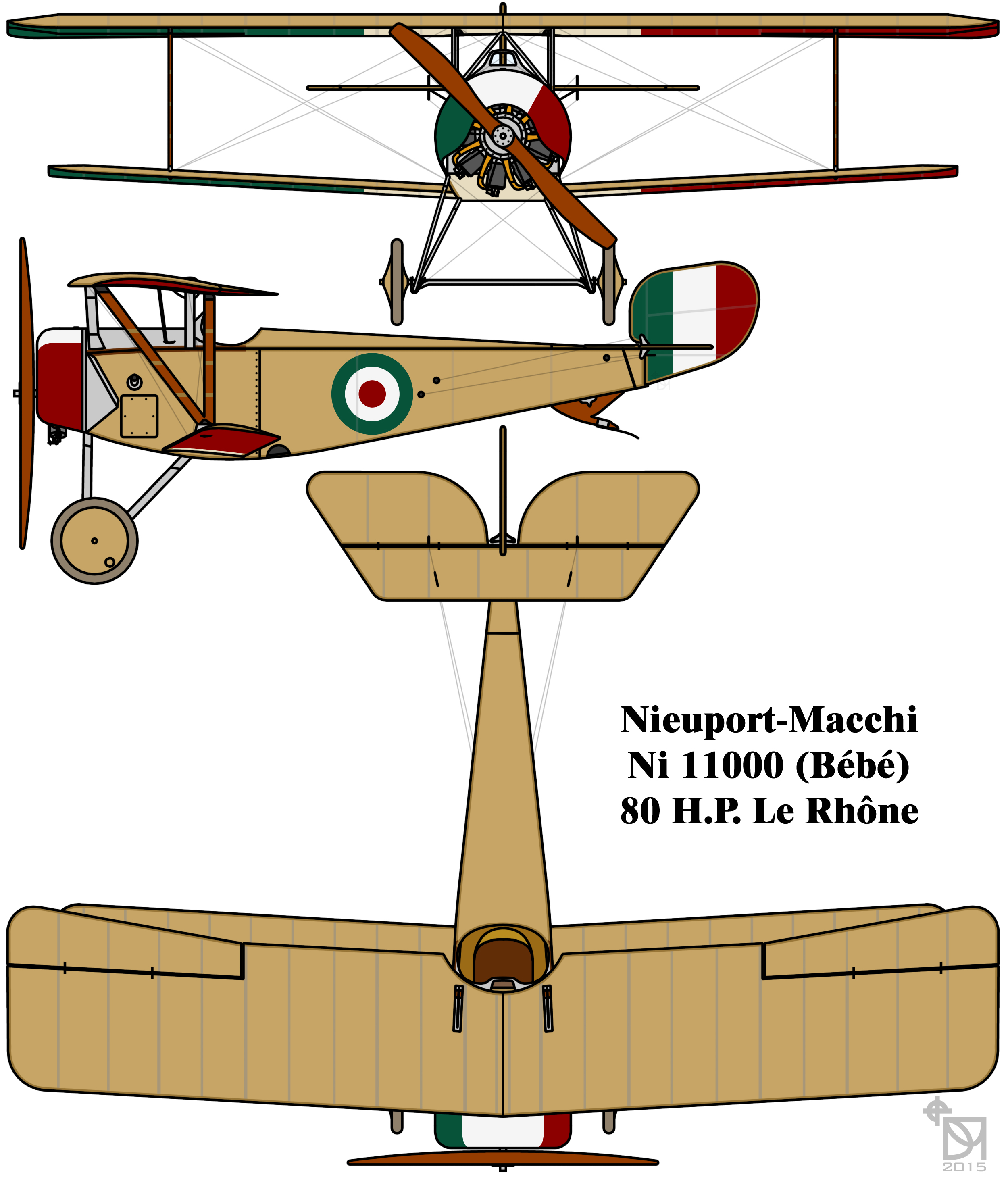
Italian Nieuport-Macchi 11.000 drawing

Kingdom of Italy

- Corpo Aeronautico Militare - built under licence by Nieuport-Macchi
  - Supreme Command
    - 70a Squadriglia
  - 9th Gruppo (1 Armata)
    - 71a Squadriglia
    - 75a Squadriglia
    - 78a Squadriglia
  - 2nd Gruppo (2nd & 4th Armata)
    - 76a Squadriglia
    - 81a Squadriglia
    - 85a Squadriglia (last Italian unit to operate Nieuport 11s, withdrawn 4 November 1918)
  - 3rd gruppo
    - 72a Squadriglia
  - 7th Gruppo (6th & 1st Armata)
    - 79a Squadriglia
  - 10th Gruppo
    - 70a Squadriglia
    - 78a Squadriglia
    - 82a Squadriglia
    - 91a Squadriglia
  - Independent
    - 83a Squadriglia
    - 85a Squadriglia
    - Sezione Nieuport

Netherlands

- Luchtvaartafdeling (1 example captured, and 5 copies built by NV at Trompenburg)

Romania

- Corpul Aerian Român - 1 Nieuport 11 was transferred from RNAS No.2 Wing in 1916. Total number of Nieuport 11s is unknown.
  - Grupul 1 Aeronautic
    - Escadrila N.1
  - Grupul 2 Aeronautic
    - Escadrila N.3
    - Escadrila N.11
  - Grupul 3 Aeronautic
    - Escadrila N.10

Russian Empire

- Imperial Russian Air Force - some built under licence by Dux

United Kingdom

- Royal Naval Air Service - operated 18 Nieuport 11s. The RFC did not operate the Nieuport 11.
  - No.1 Wing
  - No.2 Wing
  - No.4 Wing

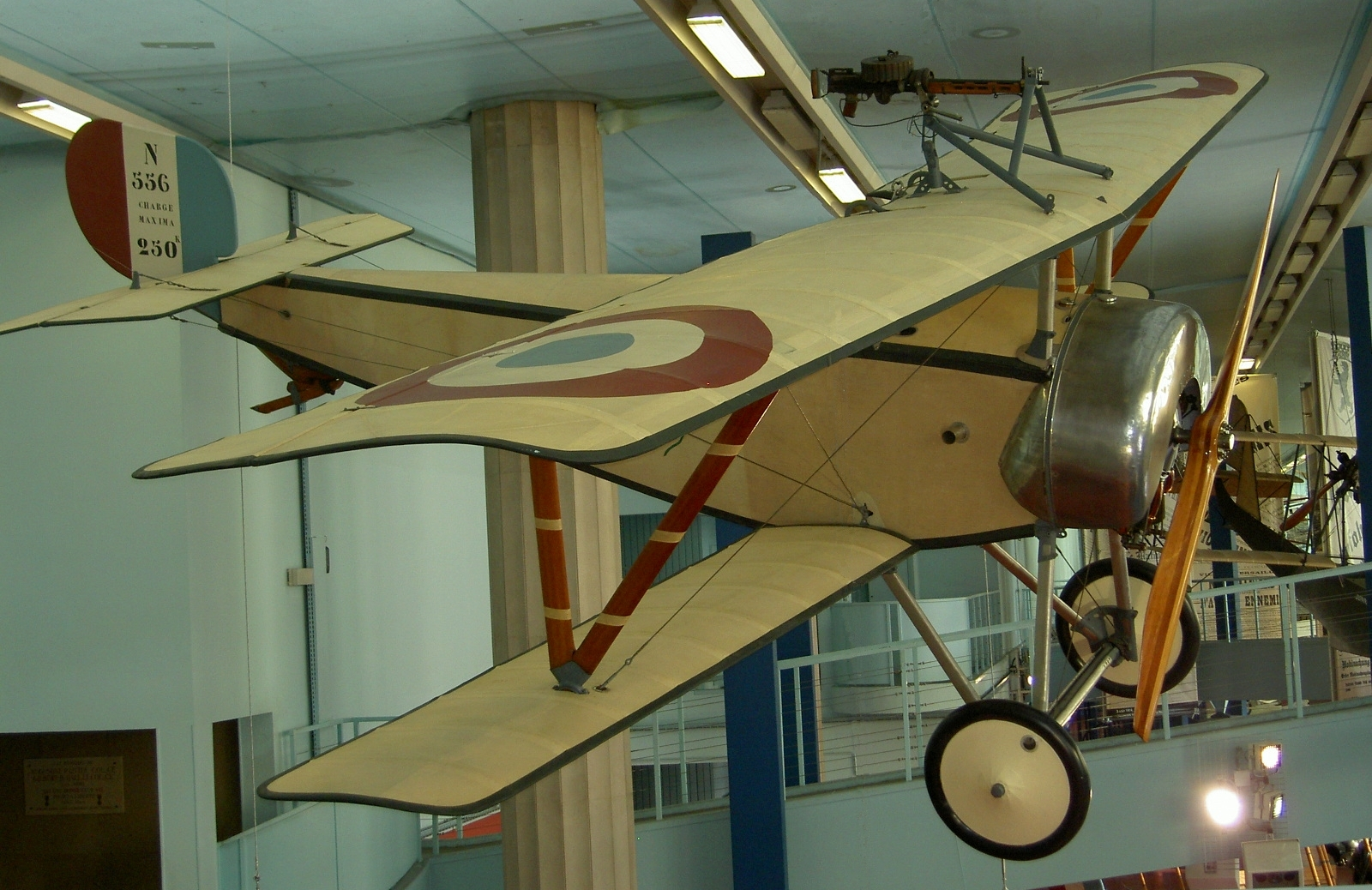
Original Nieuport 11 Bébé displayed at the Musée de l'Air in France

== Surviving aircraft and reproductions ==
- The Musée de l'Air at le Bourget in Paris has the sole original surviving Nieuport 11, currently marked as N556 with the personal markings of Commandant Charles de Tricornot de Rose, creator of the first dedicated fighter squadrons. It had previously been marked as N976.
- Old Rhinebeck Aerodrome has had a reproduction Bébé flying in many of their airshows in past years, last seen in Victor Chapman's colours, and powered with an original 80 hp (60 kW) Le Rhône 9C rotary engine, however it is currently being rebuilt following a crash.
- Vintage Aviator in New Zealand flies a Le Rhône-powered replica which was built in the United States which flies in the markings of Italian ace Alvaro Leonardi.
- Two Canadian museums have flyable 7/8 scale replicas (built smaller to fall into the experimental aircraft category under Canadian law) - the Saskatchewan Aviation Museum and the New Brunswick Aviation Museum.

== Specifications (Nieuport 11 C.1) ==
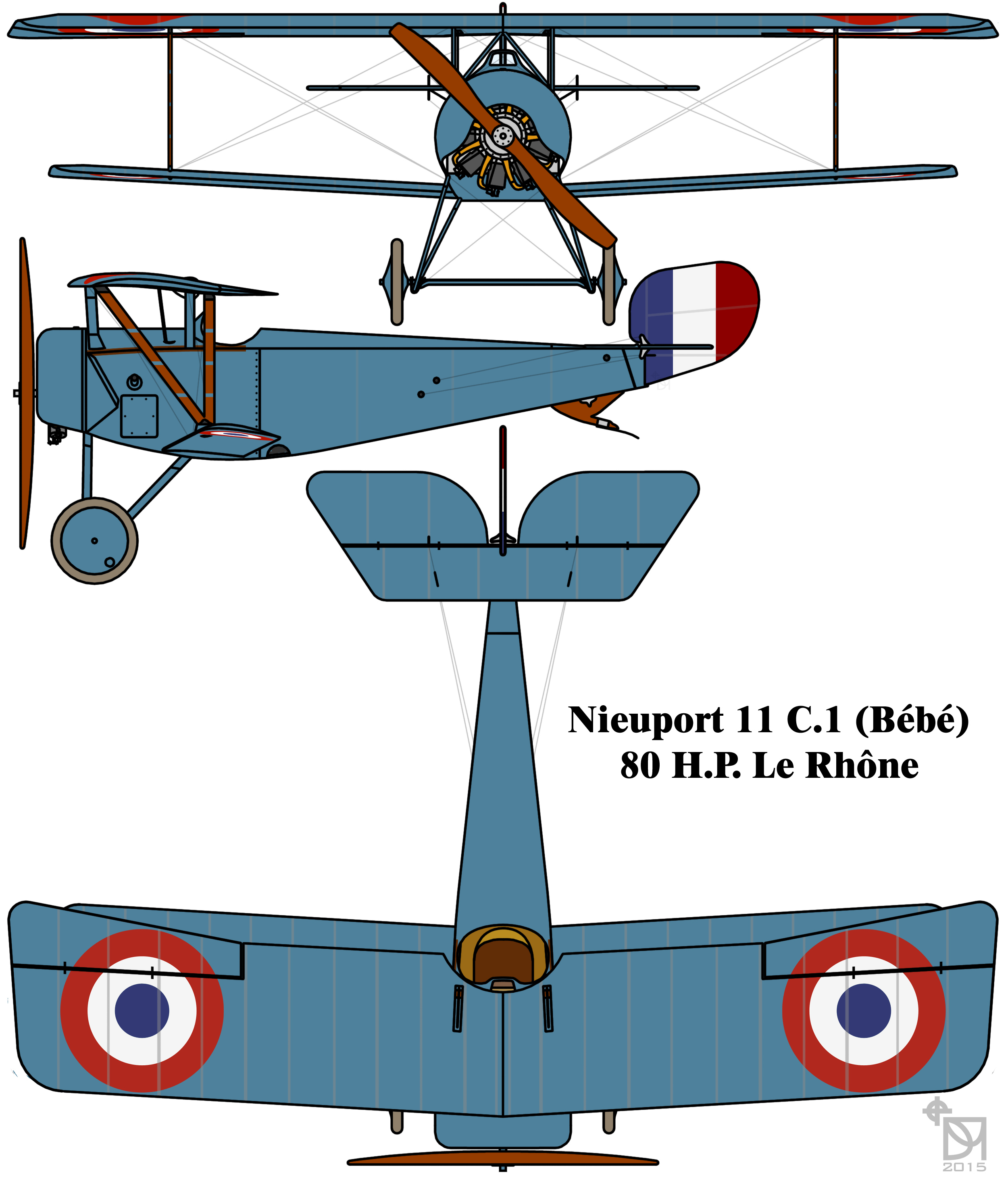
French Nieuport N.11 C.1 drawing

Data from Davilla, 1997, pp.360 & 364, and Pommier, 2002, p.169

General characteristics

- Crew: 1
- Length: 5.500 m (18 ft 1 in)
- Upper wingspan: 7.520 m (24 ft 8 in)
- Upper Chord: 1.200 m (3 ft 11.2 in)
- Lower wingspan: 7.400 m (24 ft 3 in)
- Lower Chord: 0.700 m (2 ft 3.6 in)
- Wing sweep: 3° 30'
- Height: 2.400 m (7 ft 10 in)
- Wing area: 13.3 m^{2} (143 sq ft)
- Airfoil: Type N
- Empty weight: 320 kg (705 lb)
- Gross weight: 480 kg (1,058 lb)
- Undercarriage Track: 1.600 m (5 ft 3.0 in)
- Powerplant: 1 × Le Rhône 9C nine-cylinder air-cooled rotary engine, 60 kW (80 hp)
- Propellers: 2-bladed Levasseur 450 wooden fixed-pitch propeller

Performance

- Maximum speed: 162 km/h (101 mph, 87 kn) at 2,000 m (6,600 ft)
- Range: 250 km (160 mi, 130 nmi)
- Endurance: 2.5 hours
- Service ceiling: 5,000 m (16,000 ft)
- Time to altitude:
  - 8 minutes 30 seconds to 2,000 m (6,600 ft)
  - 15 minutes 25 seconds to 3,000 m (9,800 ft)
- Wing loading: 36.0 kg/m^{2} (7.4 lb/sq ft)

Armament

- 1 × .303" Lewis or Hotchkiss machine gun
- 8 × air to air Le Prieur rockets for use against observation balloons (optional)

== See also ==
- 1915 in aviation
- Circa Nieuport 11 (replica)

Related development

- Nieuport 10
- Nieuport 16
- Nieuport 17
- Nieuport 21

Aircraft of comparable role, configuration, and era

- Airco DH.2
- Bristol Scout
- Euler D.I
- Fokker Eindecker fighters
- Halberstadt D.II
- Sopwith Pup

Related lists

- List of military aircraft of France
- List of aircraft of the Royal Naval Air Service
