= Pillon =

Pillon may refer to:

- Pillon, Meuse, a commune in the Meuse department in Lorraine in north-eastern France
- Col du Pillon, a mountain pass in the western Swiss Alps
- Edmond Pillon (1891–1921), French World War I flying ace credited with eight aerial victories
- François Pillon (1830–1914), French philosopher
- Giuseppe Pillon (born 1956), Italian football manager
- Jacqueline Pillon (born 1977), Canadian actress
