= Echard =

Echard, Échard or Eachard are surnames, and may refer to:

- Jacques Échard (1644 – 1724), French Dominican and historian
- John Eachard (1636? – 1697), English clergyman and satirist
- Laurence Echard (c 1670 – 1730), English historian and clergyman
- Raoul Echard (1883 – 1922), French flying ace
