= Marie Lecoq De Kerland =

Marie Charles Maurice Lecoq De Kerland
- Born: 21 December 1887; Bordeaux, France
- Died: 5 November 1978 (aged 90); Bordeaux, France
- Military career
- Allegiance: France
- Branch: Aviation
- Rank: Lieutenant
- Units: Escadrille 68, Escadrille 90, Escadrille 82
- Awards: Legion d'Honneur, Croix de Guerre

Lieutenant Marie Charles Maurice Lecoq De Kerland was a World War I flying ace credited with seven aerial victories.
