= Nieuport 16 =

French WW1 fighter aircraft

Nieuport 16 C.1
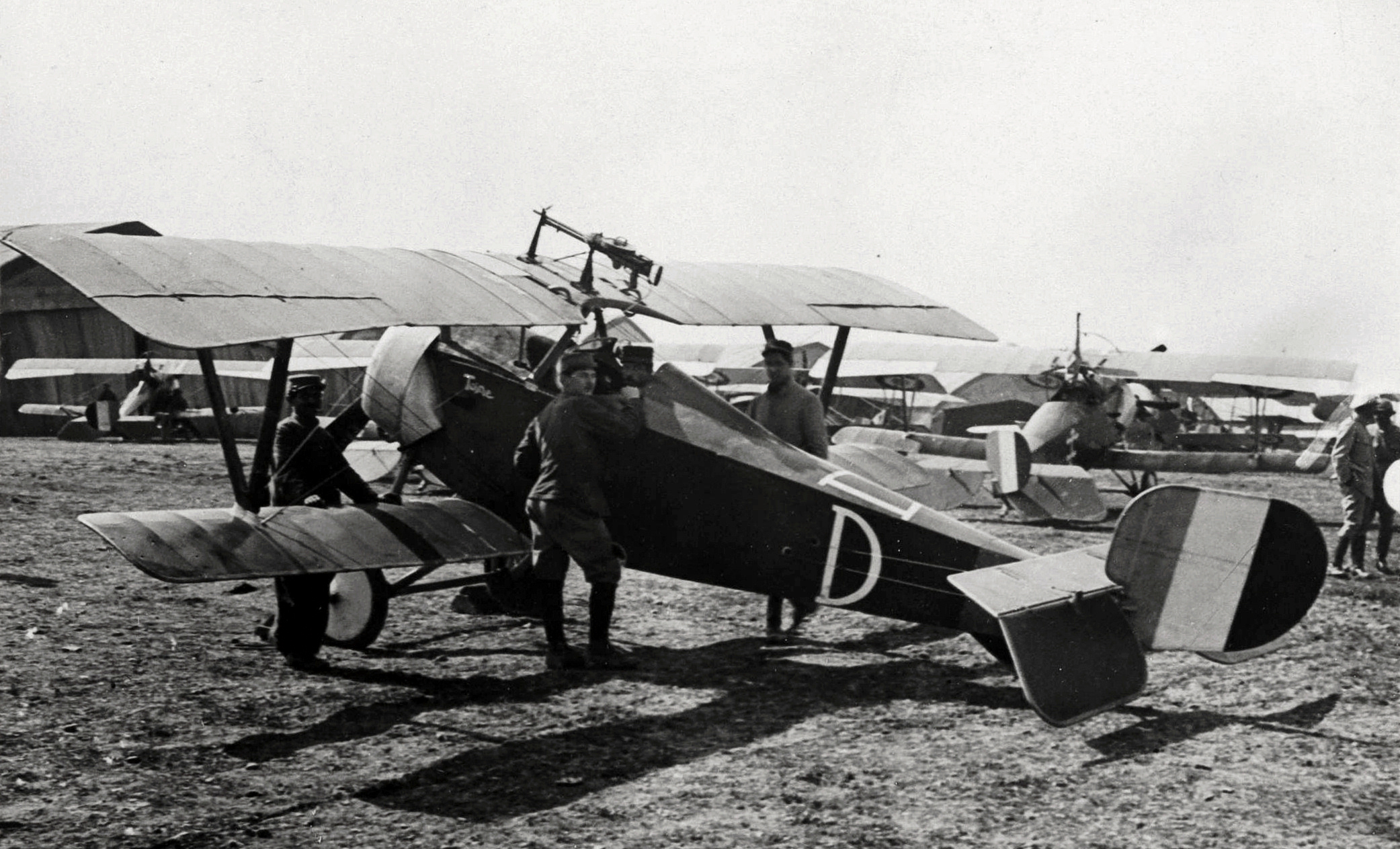

General information
- Type: Fighter
- National origin: France
- Manufacturer: Nieuport, Dux
- Designer: Gustave Delage
- Primary users: Aéronautique Militaire (France) Royal Flying Corps, Imperial Russian Air Service
- Number built: unknown

History
- Manufactured: 1916
- Introduction date: March 1916
- First flight: 1916
- Retired: 1917
- Developed from: Nieuport 11
- Developed into: Nieuport 17

The Nieuport 16 C.1 (or Nieuport XVI C.1 in contemporary sources) (Note: The C in the designation indicates that it is a chasseur or fighter, and the 1 indicates the number of crew members.) was a French World War I single-seat sesquiplane fighter aircraft, designed by Gustave Delage as a development of the Nieuport 11 with a more powerful engine. The Nieuport 16's service life coincided with the period when the first air-to-air rockets, the Le Prieur rocket, were used most frequently, and the type has a closer association with them than any other aircraft.

== Development ==
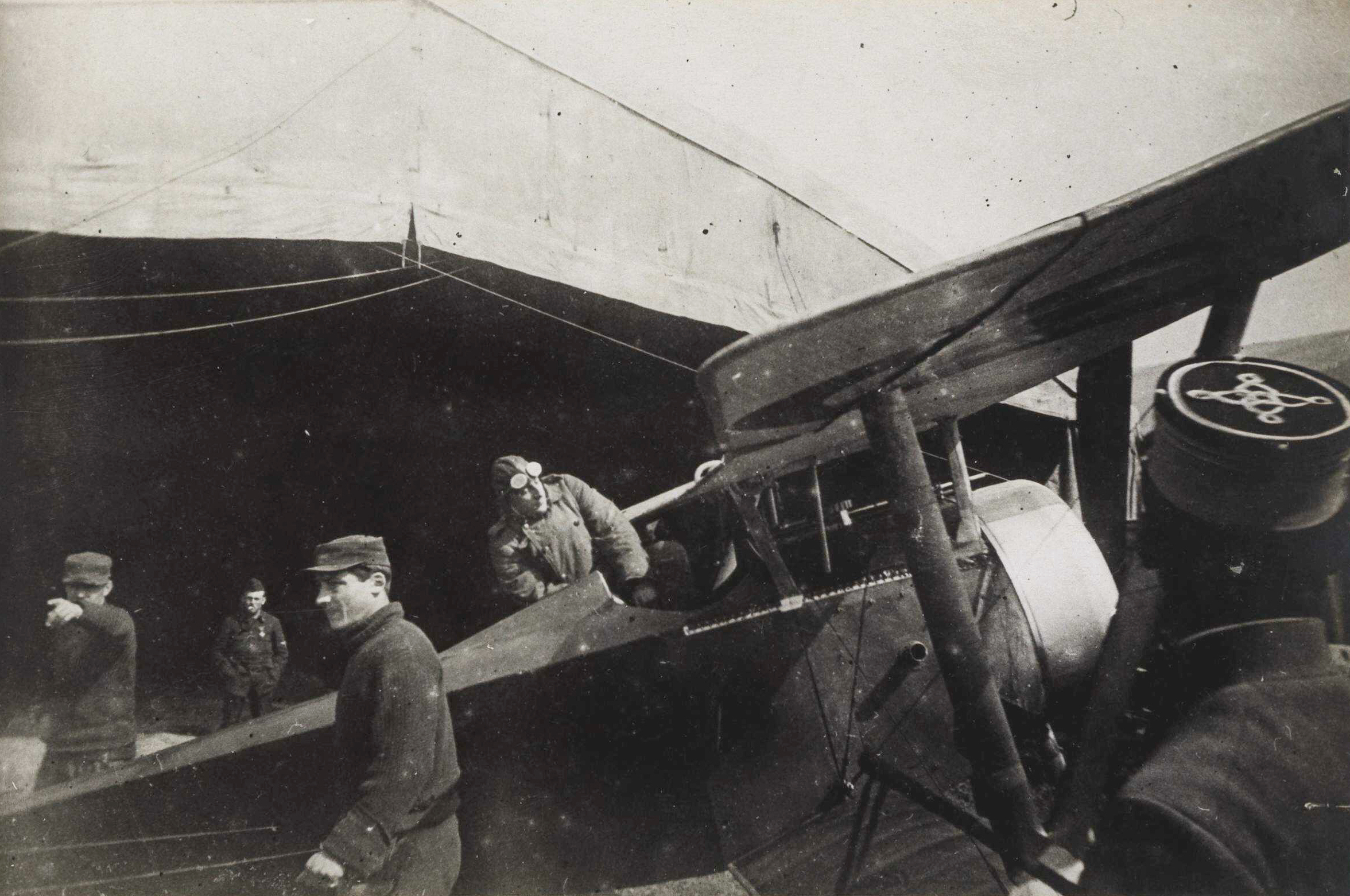
Jean Navarre boarding his Nieuport 16, fitted with the short-lived synchronized Lewis

The Nieuport 16 was an improved Nieuport 11 developed in 1916, with a strengthened airframe powered by a more powerful 110 hp (82 kW) Le Rhône 9J rotary engine. Visible differences included a headrest for the pilot and a larger aperture in front of the "horseshoe" cowling. The Nieuport 16 was an interim type pending the delivery of the slightly larger Nieuport 17 C.1, whose design was begun in parallel with the 16, and which remedied the 16's limitations, as well as improving performance. Additional Nieuport 16s were built under licence in Russia by Dux, which also added a headrest to the Nieuport 11s they were still building, making identification more difficult.

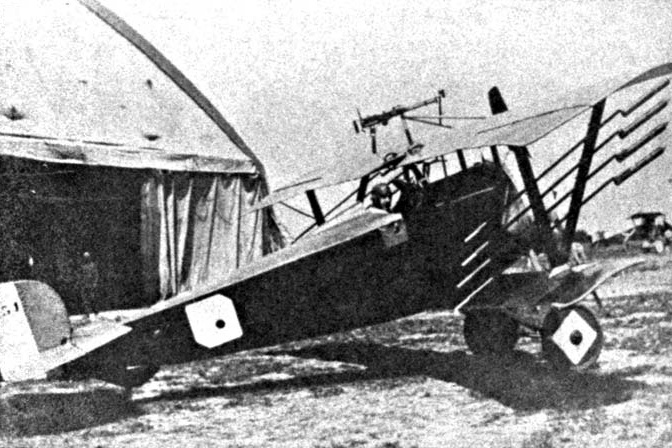
Nieuport 16 with Le Prieur rockets

As with the Nieuport 11, no synchronizer was initially available, which meant the Nieuport 16's Lewis machine gun was similarly mounted to fire over the propeller. Some of the first examples delivered to the Royal Flying Corps (RFC) were fitted with a Lewis mounted on the cowl in front of the pilot and fitted with an Alkan-Hamy synchronization gear: however the Lewis's open bolt firing cycle resulted in an unpredictable rate of fire which played havoc with the timing and these soon reverted to the overwing mounts. The Alkan-Hamy gear was then applied much more successfully to a fuselage-mounted Vickers machine gun, which was used on later French Nieuport 16s. However this configuration made the aircraft dangerously nose-heavy and increased the wing loading which compromised manoeuvrability. The British would continue with the overwing gun for all of their Nieuport scouts, and developed their own Foster mounting to improve on the numerous French designs. Although used widely on later Nieuport types, the Nieuport 16 was used to test the initial design. Clearing gun jams and replacing ammunition drums in flight remained challenging though, and the drums still limited ammunition supply even after the British introduced a new "double" 98 round drum.

Some Nieuport 16s were fitted to fire Le Prieur rockets from the struts for attacks on observation Kite balloon. They were even used on occasion to break up enemy aircraft formations, however no victories over other aircraft or the Zeppelins they had originally been designed to defeat were recorded. The fire from their rocket motors was inherently hazardous to the aircraft they were used on, due to the highly flammable nature of the covering used on almost all WW1 aircraft and protective metal sheeting was added to the lower wings, and the interplane struts that the rocket's eight launch tubes were attached to.

== Operational history ==
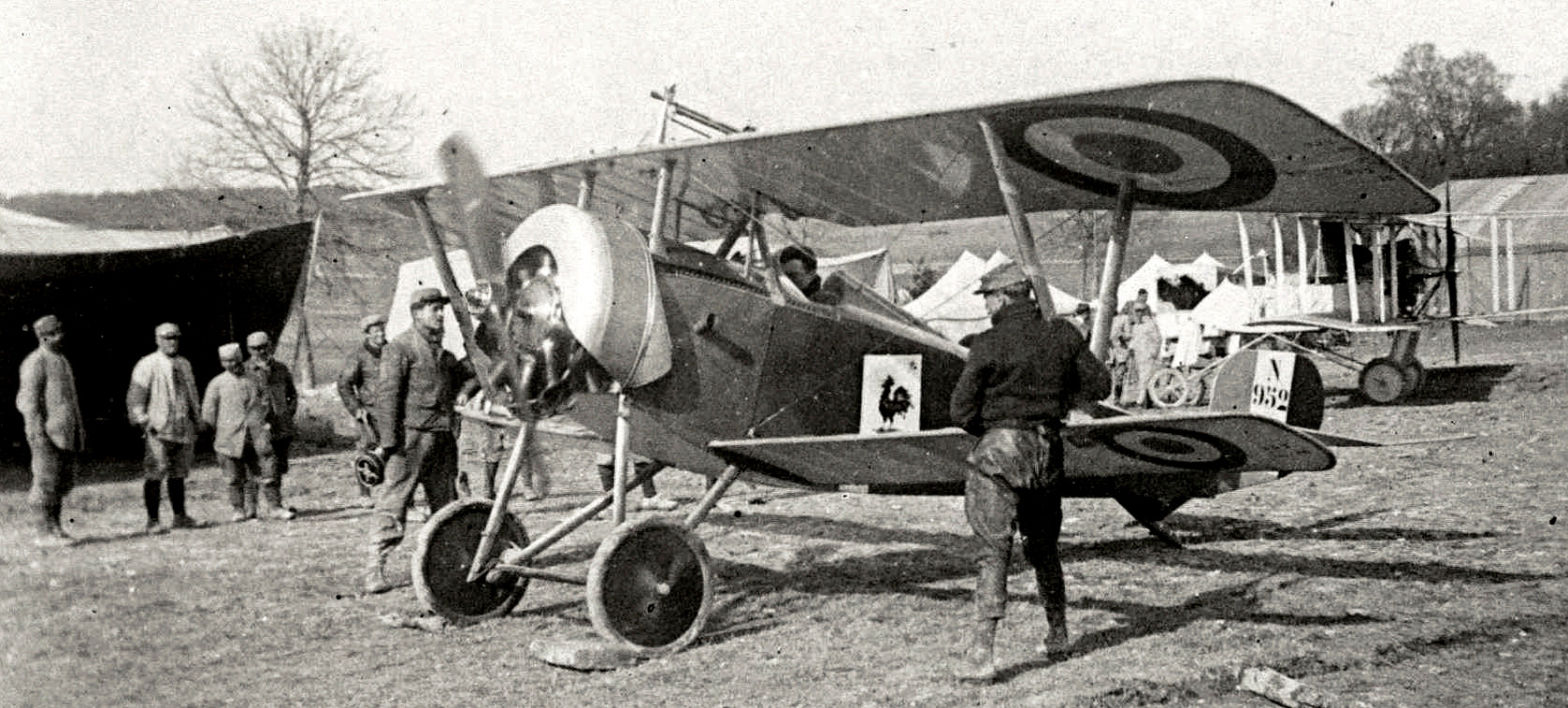
Jules Védrines in a Nieuport 16

As an interim type bridging the gap between the preceding Nieuport 11 and the more sophisticated Nieuport 17, it rarely equipped entire units by itself in French service, but was operated alongside both types, as well as the two seat Nieuport 12, and even Nieuport 10s. Its period of ascendancy would begin shortly after the start of the Battle of Verdun and encompassed the entire Battle of the Somme, both battles that set records for their duration and staggeringly large casualty lists.

One of many results of Verdun was French experimentation with camouflaging aircraft, which included using single overall colours including horizon blue and tan on Nieuport 11s, and culminated with a 4 colour disruptive camouflage pattern that was standardized on later Nieuport 11s, and used on almost all of the Nieuport 16s.

The same period also coincided with the greatest use of the first air-air rockets, the Le Prieur. Although erratic and difficult to aim, they were successfully used against German Drachen kite balloons. In their first operational deployment, eight aces including Nungesser, Guiguet and Chaput were specially trained by Le Prieur in their use, and in an early morning attack on 22 May 1916, managed to down six balloons in short order, panicking the German authorities into lowering the remainder along a 100 km (62 mi) stretch of the front lines, blinding the German Army in time for the first French counter-attack on Fort Douaumont. Le Prieurs were also occasionally used against ground targets, the first recorded instance of an air to ground rocket attack being on 29 June 1916, when a roving Nieuport 16 equipped with Le Prieur rockets found a large ammunition dump, and blew it up.

One of the first pilots to be officially recognized as an ace and dubbed "The Sentinel of Verdun", Jean Navarre flew several Nieuports over Verdun, including two Nieuport 16s, the second of which had a red fuselage. Five of his 16 confirmed victories were scored in Nieuport 16s. Contemporary to Navarre and a close friend, Charles Nungesser scored 9 of his eventual 43 victories in Nieuport 16s. When the Nieuport 16 had become obsolete for front line use, they continued to be used for advanced training into 1917, particularly in the use of Le Prieur rockets.

The Royal Naval Air Service (RNAS) had also ordered 14 Nieuport 16s to begin replacing their Nieuport 11s, however they were transferred directly to the Royal Flying Corps which was finding that its de Havilland DH.2 pusher aircraft were inadequate against the Halberstadt D.II and other replacements for the Fokker Eindecker. It came to light that the reason they had not purchased any Nieuport Scouts previously despite their obvious performance advantages over all other available fighters, was the seeming refusal of Nieuport to pay bribes to the officers collecting aircraft. All of the planned RNAS aircraft were then delivered to the RFC without having been operated by the Royal Naval Air Service, while 9 more were delivered directly to the RFC. The top scoring RFC ace while the Nieuport 16 was in service was Albert Ball, who scored many of his kills with Nieuport 16s. The RFC equipped their Nieuport 16s with Le Prieur rockets (called torpedoes by the crews) for use against the balloons arrayed against them prior to the Battle of the Somme, and on the 25th of June, 1916, 15 Drachen balloons were attacked, and six set alight. At least one RFC Nieuport 16, and possibly more were converted into high speed photo-reconnaissance aircraft by the RFC, including A208 from No.60 Squadron. Some surviving examples were used after they had been replaced in operational service as trainers at the Scout School formed at Saint-Omer.

The Imperial Russian Air Service also operated a relatively small number of Nieuport 16s while they also awaited the arrival of the Nieuport 17, however surviving records are not clear how many as they didn't distinguish between the two types, and referred to both as Nieuport 16s.

== Operators ==
Belgium

- Aviation Militaire Belge
  - 1ère Escadrille de Chasse

France

- Aéronautique Militaire
  - Escadrille N.12
  - Escadrille N.23
  - Escadrille N.31
  - Escadrille N.38
  - Escadrille N.48
  - Escadrille N.49
  - Escadrille N.57
  - Escadrille N.68
  - Escadrille N.73
  - Escadrille N.75
  - Escadrille N.77
  - Escadrille N.102
  - Escadrille N.112
  - Escadrille N.124
  - Groupement de Combat de Somme
    - Escadrille N.3
    - Escadrille N.26
    - Escadrille N.103
  - Groupement de Chasse Cachy
    - Escadrille N.15
    - Escadrille N.23
    - Escadrille N.37
    - Escadrille N.62
    - Escadrille N.65
    - Escadrille N.67
    - Escadrille N.69
- Aéronautique Navale
  - Escadrille de chasse terrestre du CAM de Dunkerque - operated one Nieuport 16, N1354 from June 1916 to July 1917.

Russian Empire

- Imperial Russian Air Force - some built under licence by Dux
  - 11th Corps Detachment
  - 19th Corps Detachment
  - 2nd Combat Air Group

United Kingdom

- Royal Flying Corps - operated 25 Nieuport 16s delivered from 16 April to 6 August 1916.
  - No. 1 Squadron RFC
  - No. 3 Squadron RFC
  - No. 11 Squadron RFC
  - No. 29 Squadron RFC - withdrawn in April 1917 as last operational RFC unit with Nieuport 16s.
  - No. 60 Squadron RFC
  - No. 64 Squadron RFC

== Specifications (Nieuport 16 C.1) ==
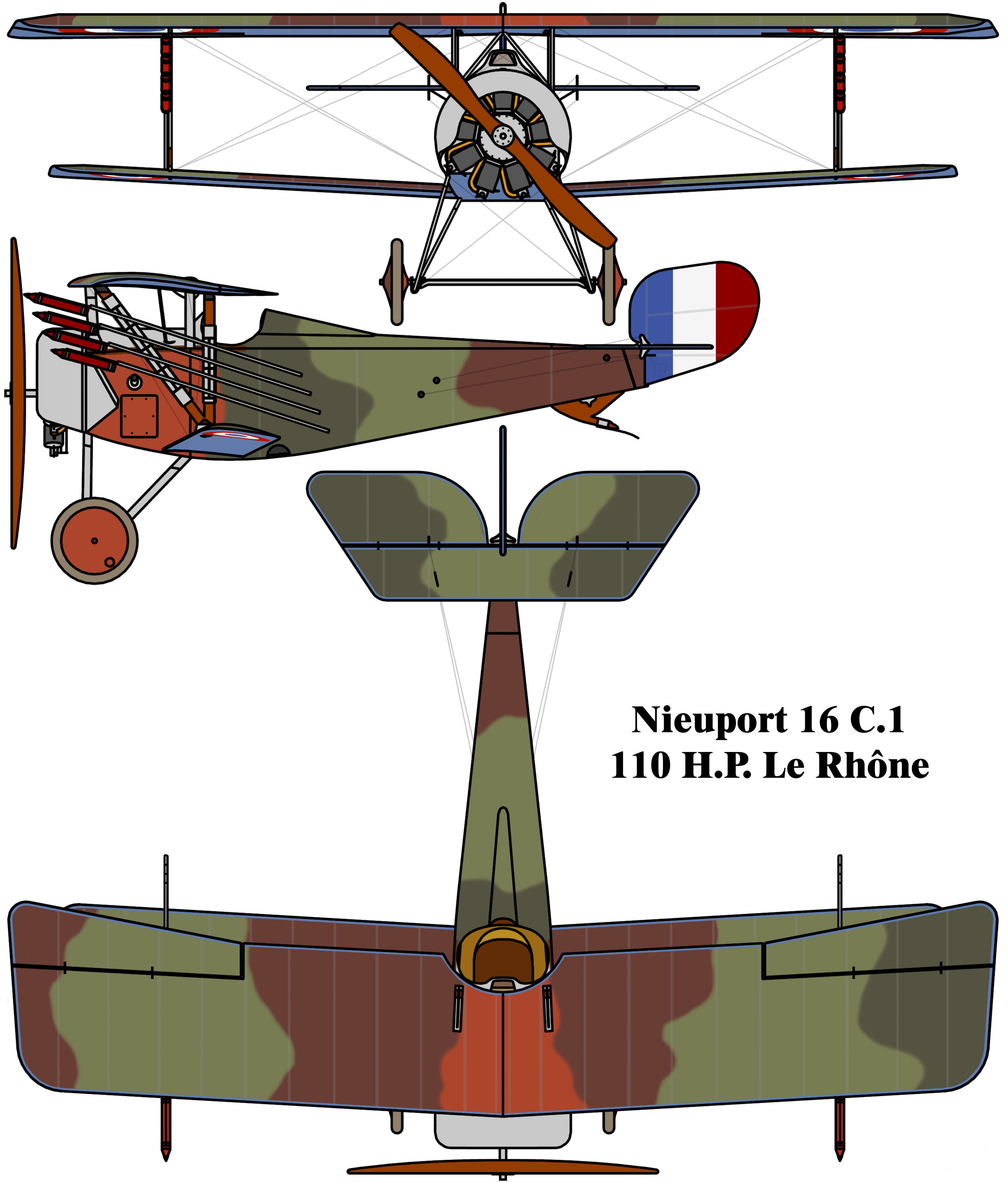
Nieuport 16 with le Prieur rockets and the typical Verdun camouflage

Data from Davilla, 1997, p.378, Pommier, 2002, p.171 and Durkota, 1995, p.358

General characteristics

- Crew: 1
- Length: 5.640 m (18 ft 6 in)
- Upper wingspan: 7.520 m (24 ft 8 in)
- Upper chord: 1.200 m (3 ft 11.2 in)
- Wing sweep: 3° 30'
- Lower wingspan: 7.400 m (24 ft 3 in)
- Lower chord: 0.700 m (2 ft 3.6 in)
- Height: 2.40 m (7 ft 10 in)
- Wing area: 13.30 m^{2} (143.2 sq ft)
- Airfoil: Type N
- Empty weight: 375 kg (827 lb)
- Gross weight: 550 kg (1,213 lb)
- Fuel capacity: 45 kg
- Undercarriage track: 1.60 m (5 ft 3 in)
- Powerplant: 1 × Le Rhône 9J 9-cylinder rotary engine, 82 kW (110 hp) (nominal rated power, not measured power)
- Propellers: 2-bladed Levasseur 482 wooden propeller

Performance

- Maximum speed: 165 km/h (103 mph, 89 kn) at sea level
  - 156 km/h (97 mph; 84 kn) at 2,000 m (6,600 ft)
- Endurance: 2 hours
- Service ceiling: 4,800 m (15,700 ft)
- Time to altitude:
  - 5 minutes 50 seconds to 2,000 m (6,600 ft)
  - 10 minutes 10 seconds to 3,000 m (9,800 ft)
- Wing loading: 39.6 kg/m^{2} (8.1 lb/sq ft)
- Power/mass: 4.9 kg/hp

Armament

- 1 × .303 in (7.7 mm) Lewis machine gun OR 1 × .303 in (7.7 mm) Vickers machine gun
- 8 × air to air Le Prieur rockets for use against observation balloons or ground targets (optional)

== See also ==
- 1916 in aviation

Related development

- Nieuport 10
- Nieuport 11
- Nieuport 17
- Nieuport 21

Aircraft of comparable role, configuration, and era

- Airco DH.2
- Bristol Scout
- Euler D.I
- Fokker Eindecker fighters
- Halberstadt D.II
- Sopwith Pup

Related lists

- List of fighter aircraft
- List of military aircraft of France
- List of aircraft of the Royal Flying Corps
- List of military aircraft of the Entente Powers in World War I
