= List of aerial victories of Josef Jacobs =

Josef Jacobs was a German fighter ace of the First World War, credited with 48 confirmed and 12 unconfirmed aerial victories.

== List of victories ==
This list is complete for entries, though obviously not for all details. Background data was abstracted from Above the Lines: The Aces and Fighter Units of the German Air Service, Naval Air Service and Flanders Marine Corps, 1914–1918, ISBN 978-0-948817-73-1, p. 136, and from The Aerodrome webpage on Jacobs Additional sources are as noted. Abbreviations from those sources were expanded by editor creating this list.

No.	Date/time	Victim	Squadron	Location	Remarks
Assigned,					Flieger-Abteilung 11, 3 July 1915
Unconfirmed	1 February 1916	Voisin			Unharmed aircrew in undamaged Caudron G.4 at "crash site"
Transfer,					to Fokkerstaffel West
1, or	22 March 1916	Observation balloon			Debatable first victory
1	12 May 1916	Enemy aircraft			Debatable first victory
Transfer,					to Jagdstaffel 22, 18 January 1917
2	23 January 1917	Caudron R.4		Terny-Sorny, France	
3	9 February 1917 @ 1635 hours	French two-seater		Cerny, Essonne, France	
Unconfirmed	6 April 1917 @ 1930 hours	Observation balloon	21st Company	Blanzy-Vailly	
4	13 April 1917 @ 1955 hours	Farman		Barisis, France	
5	16 April 1917 in the pm	Observation balloon		Laffaux, France	
Unconfirmed	7 May 1917	SPAD		Braye	
Unconfirmed	28 May 1917	Nieuport			
Unconfirmed	26 June 1917	SPAD		Pontavert, France	
Unconfirmed	27 June 1917	SPAD		Cerny, France	
Unconfirmed	6 July 1917	SPAD			
Unconfirmed	28 July 1917 @ 0705 hours	SPAD		Near Craonne, France	
Unconfirmed	28 July 1917 @ 1200 hours	SPAD		Near Soissons, France	
Transferred,					to Jagdstaffel 7
6	20 August 1917 @ 1735 hours	Sopwith Triplane	No. 10 Naval Squadron	Langemark, Belgium	
7	10 September 1917 @ 1905 hours	SPAD	Escadrille SPA.48, Service Aéronautique		Ace Jean Matton killed in action
8	11 September 1917 @ 0830 hours	Sopwith Camel		Koekost	
9	18 October 1917 @ 0950 hours	Airco D.H.4		Zillebeke Lake, Belgium	
10	9 November 1917 @ 1530 hours	SPAD	Escadrille SPA.103, Service Aéronautique	Woumen, Belgium	
11	6 December 1917 @ 1035 hours	SPAD	No. 23 Squadron RFC	Passchendaele (Passendale), Belgium	
Unconfirmed	8 December 1917 @ 1355 hours	Sopwith Camel		Passendale, Belgium	
12	18 December 1917 @ 1545 hours	Sopwith Camel	No. 65 Squadron RFC	Diksmuide, Belgium	
13	11 April 1918 @ 1805 hours	Royal Aircraft Factory R.E.8	No. 7 Squadron RAF	West of Ostend, Belgium	
14	21 April 1918 @ 1115 hours	Sopwith Camel	No. 54 Squadron RAF	South of Armentieres, France	
15	14 May 1918 @ 1640 hours	Observation balloon	27th Company	North of Ypres, Belgium	
16	14 May 1918 @ 1645 hours	Observation balloon	50th Company	Northwest of Ypres, Belgium	
17	23 May 1918 @ 0940 hours	Royal Aircraft Factory SE.5		Kruisstraat, Belgium	
18	1 June 1918 @ 0740 hours	Bristol F.2 Fighter	No. 20 Squadron RAF	Northwest of Dikkebus, Belgium	
19	5 June 1918 @ 1120 hours	Sopwith Camel	No. 203 Squadron RAF	West of Bailleau, France	
20	10 June 1918 @ 0845 hours	Sopwith Camel		South of Poperinge, Belgium	
21	19 June 1918 @ 2025 hours	Royal Aircraft Factory R.E.8	No. 21 Squadron RAF	East of Zwartelen, Belgium	
22	26 June 1918 @ 2015 hours	Sopwith Camel	No. 210 Squadron RAF	Menin (Menen), Belgium	
23	17 July 1918 @ 2110 hours	Sopwith Camel		Southwest of Nieuwpoort (Nieport)	
24	19 July 1918 @ 0930 hours	Royal Aircraft Factory SE.5a	No. 74 Squadron RAF	Moorslede, Belgium	
25	13 September 1918 @ 1500 hours	Royal Aircraft Factory R.E.8		Between Kemmel, Belgium and Bailleul	
26	15 September 1918 @ 1900 hours	Armstrong Whitworth F.K.8	No. 82 Squadron RAF	Passchendaele, Belgium	
27	16 September 1918 @ 0840 hours	Royal Aircraft Factory SE.5a	No. 29 Squadron RAF	West of Menen (Menin)	
28	16 September 1918 @ 1935 hours	Observation balloon		Poperinge, Belgium	
29	19 September 1918 @ 1900 hours	Sopwith Camel			
30	21 September 1918 @ 1210 hours	Airco D.H.9	No. 107 Squadron RAF	Diksmuide, Belgium	
Unconfirmed	21 September 1918 @ 1222 hours	Airco DH.9		Northwest of Roeselare (Roulers), Belgium	
31	24 September 1918 @ 1835 hours	Sopwith Camel	No. 204 Squadron RAF	Between Diksmuide and Moorslede, Belgium	
32	28 September 1918	Royal Aircraft Factory SE.5a	No. 41 Squadron RAF	Moorslede, Belgium	
33	28 September 1918	Royal Aircraft Factory SE.5a	No. 41 Squadron RAF	Moorslede, Belgium	
34	1 October 1918	Airco DH.9			
35	2 October 1918	Airco DH.9		Stadenberg, Belgium	
36	2 October 1918 @ 1032 hours	SPAD		Houthulst Forest, Belgium	
37	3 October 1918	Sopwith Camel		Rumbeke, Belgium	
38	3 October 1918	Sopwith Camel		Rumbeke, Belgium	
39	4 October 1918	SPAD			
40	7 October 1918	Sopwith Camel	Either No. 70 Squadron RAF or No. 65 Squadron RAF		
41	8 October 1918	Observation balloon		Kemmelberg, Belgium	
42	9 October 1918	Observation balloon		Southwest of Diksmuide, Belgium	
43	9 October 1918	Observation balloon		Southwest of Diksmuide, Belgium	
44	14 October 1918	Sopwith Camel			
45	15 October 1918	Breguet 14		North of Wervik (Wervicq), Belgium	
46	19 October 1918 @ 1130 hours	SPAD	Escadrille Spa.82, Service Aéronautique	Wijnendale, Belgium	
47	19 October 1918	SPAD	Escadrille Spa.82, Service Aéronautique		
48	27 October 1918	Bristol F.2 Fighter			
