= Edmond Pillon =

French World War I flying ace

Edmond Jacques Marcel Pillon
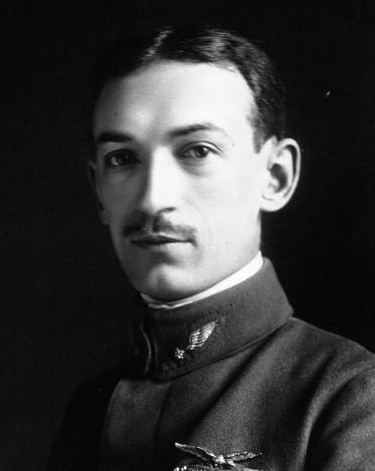
- Pillon in 1918
- Born: June 9, 1891; Chaville, France
- Died: June 8, 1921 (aged 29); Farman Airfield, Toussus-le-Noble
- Military career
- Allegiance: France
- Branch: Aviation
- Rank: Adjutant
- Units: Escadrille 102; Escadrille 82; Escadrille 67
- Awards: Médaille militaire Croix de Guerre

Adjutant Edmond Jacques Marcel Pillon (b.1891 - d.1921) was a French World War I flying ace credited with eight aerial victories.

== Biography ==
See also Aerial victory standards of World War I

Edmond Jacques Marcel Pillon was born in Chaville, France on 9 June 1891.

Pillon was called for his required military service in October 1913. On 2 August 1914, he was called to infantry duty. On 19 December 1914, he was forwarded to pilot training.

For unknown reasons, he was unusually long in qualifying as a pilot, not receiving his Military Pilot's Brevet until 8 June 1916. He became a non-commissioned Nieuport pilot in 1916, and served in Escadrilles 102 and 82. He scored a single victory for Escadrille 102, on 2 August 1916. From 6 March to 3 September 1917, Pillon scored four more confirmed wins for Escadrille 82, along with a couple of unverified claims. His record then lapsed until he began scoring again in his new assignment to fly a Spad with Escadrille 67. He scattered three victories through 1918, on 20 April, 19 May, and 2 September.

Pillon died in a postwar flying accident at Toussus-le-Noble, on 8 June 1921.

== Honors and awards ==
Médaille militaire

"Pilot of Escadrille N82, skillful and courageous, who always volunteers to take on the most perilous missions, and has already downed three German planes and engaged in more than fifty combats, during which his plane was often hit; on 21 April 1917, he attacked a balloon which he forced to descend; on 23 April he forced an enemy plane to land behind enemy lines; already cited in orders."
