= History of the Armée de l'Air (1909–1942) =

The French roundel gave rise to similar roundels for other air forces.

The Armée de l'Air (literally, 'army of the air') is the name used for the French Air Force in its native language since it was made independent of the Army in 1933. This article deals exclusively with the history of the French air force from its earliest beginnings until its destruction after the occupation of France. French naval aviation, the Aéronautique Navale is covered elsewhere.

== Military aviation to 1914 ==
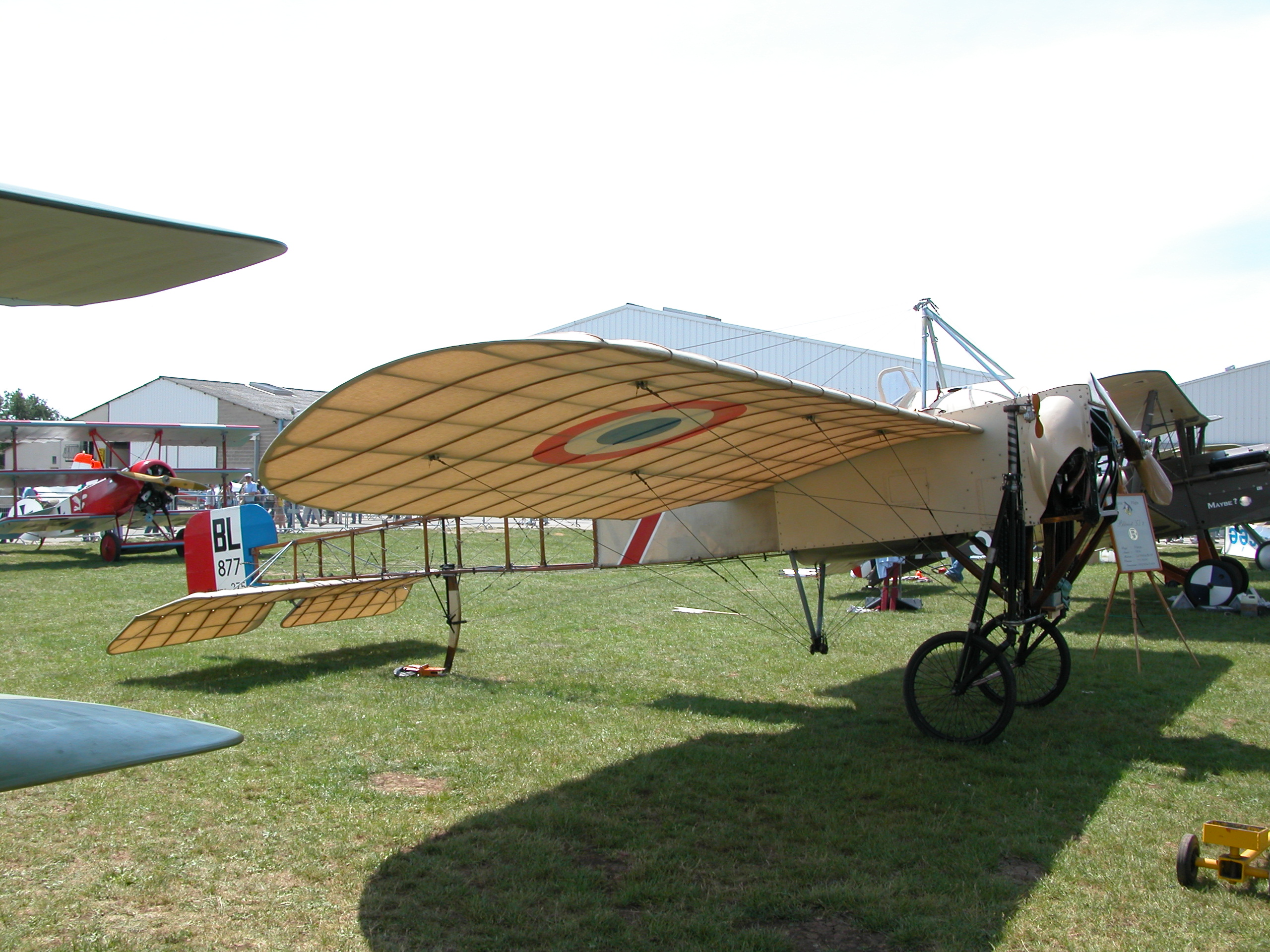
Restored Blériot XI in Aéronautique Militaire markings.

During the first decade of the 20th century France was at the forefront of aviation progress, with pioneers such as Louis Blériot, Henri Farman, Gabriel Voisin, Édouard Nieuport, Gustave Delage and Louis Béchereau and this led to early interest in aircraft by the military. The French defeat during the Franco-Prussian War of 1870–1871 was still very fresh, and France expected to face Germany again. From December 1909, the French Department of War began to send individuals from all branches of the army, especially engineering and artillery, to undergo flying training at civilian schools as "pupil-pilots" (élèves-pilotes) such as at Reims and Bron. In March 1910, the Établissement Militaire d'Aviation (EMA) was created to conduct experiments with aircraft and on 22 October 1910 the Aéronautique Militaire was formed as a branch of the Army under the command of General Pierre Roques, although they would have to wait until mid-1911 the first military aviation brevets to be awarded to army pilots and 29 March 1912 for the law officially establishing the Aéronautique Militaire to be passed.

Training of military pilots was the same as civilian pilots until 1910 when the General Staff introduced the military pilot license. Military pilot badge N°1 was issued to Lieutenant Charles de Tricornot de Rose following training at the Blériot Flying School in Pau, in southwest of France, where the Wright Brothers had established the first aviation school the year before.

Shortly after the Aéronautique Militaire became be the world's first "air force" using aircraft, the German army began training airmen on 4 July 1910 but didn't create an official formation until 1 April 1911 when it formed the königlich-preußische Fliegertruppe. The British Air Battalion Royal Engineers (a precursor to the Royal Flying Corps), was formed on 1 April 1911. The Armée de l'Air was renamed in August 1933 when it gained operational independence from the Army, much later than for the United Kingdom, but some 14 years earlier than that of the United States.

== First World War ==
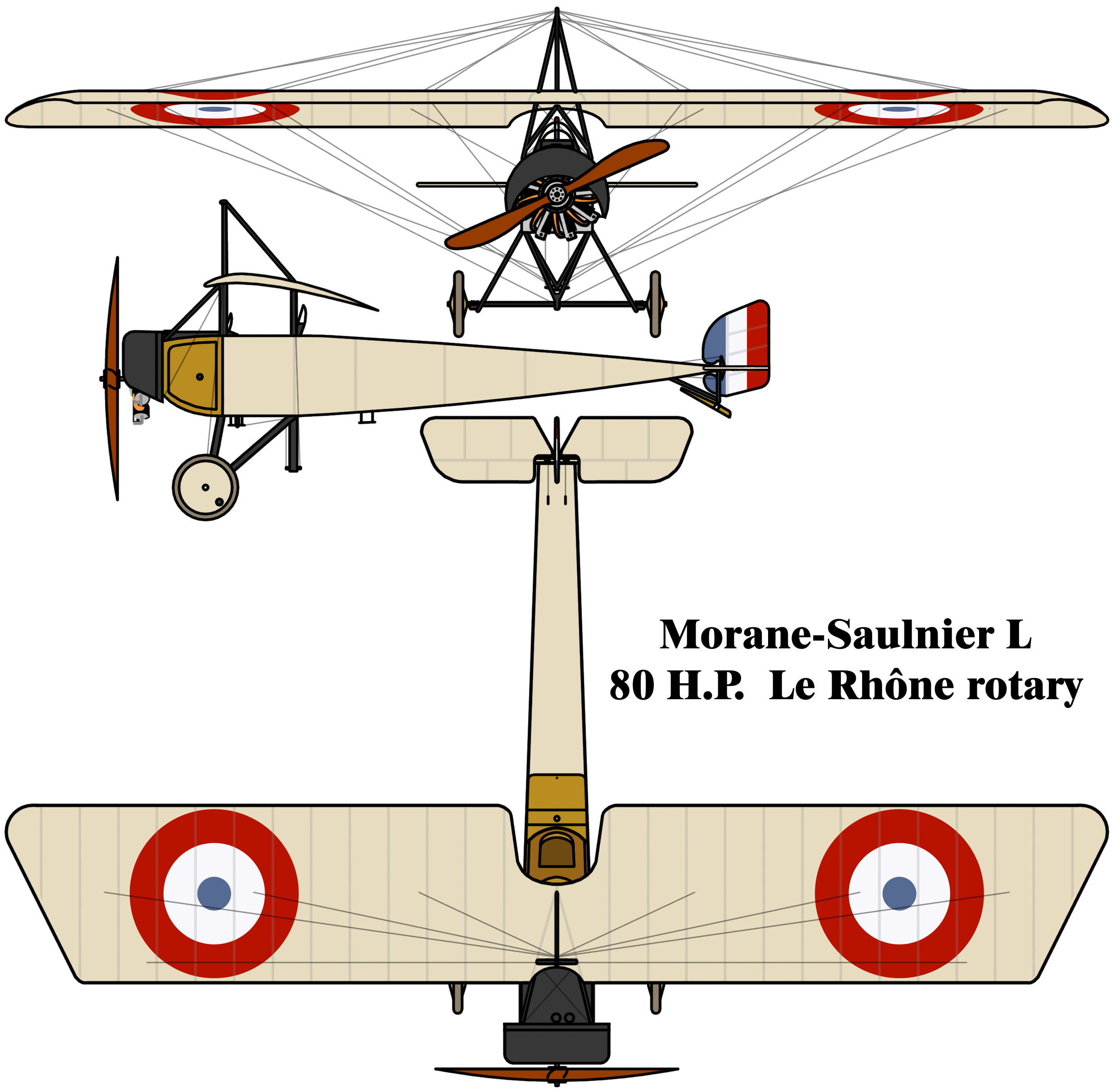
1914 Morane-Saulnier L reconnaissance monoplane

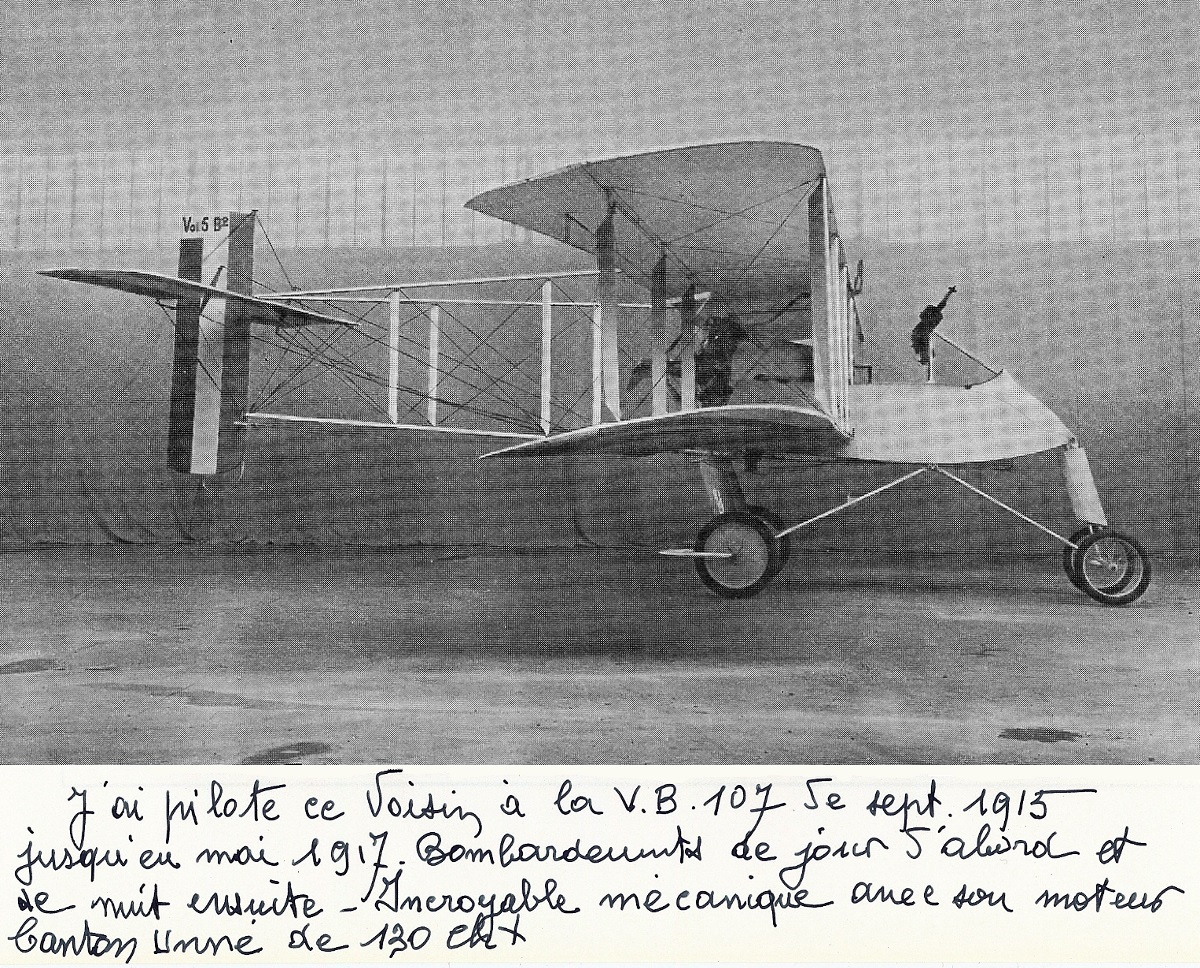
1915 Voisin V bomber

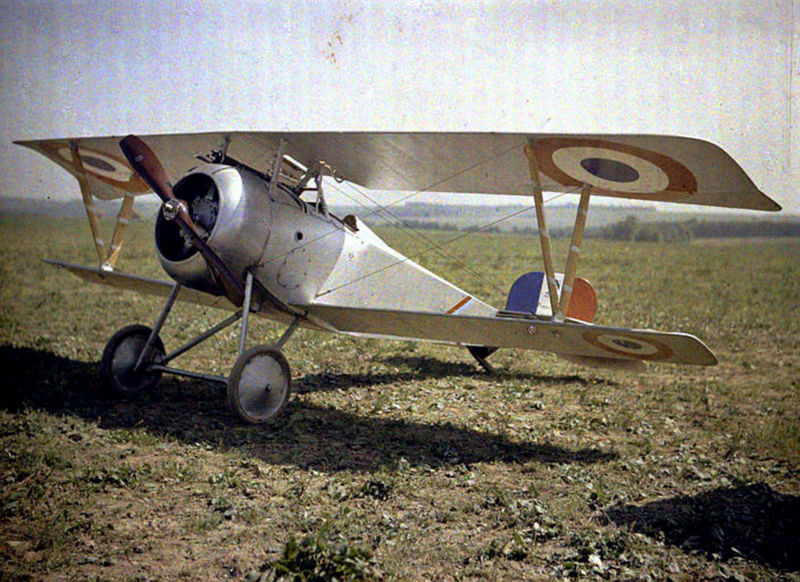
1916 Nieuport 23

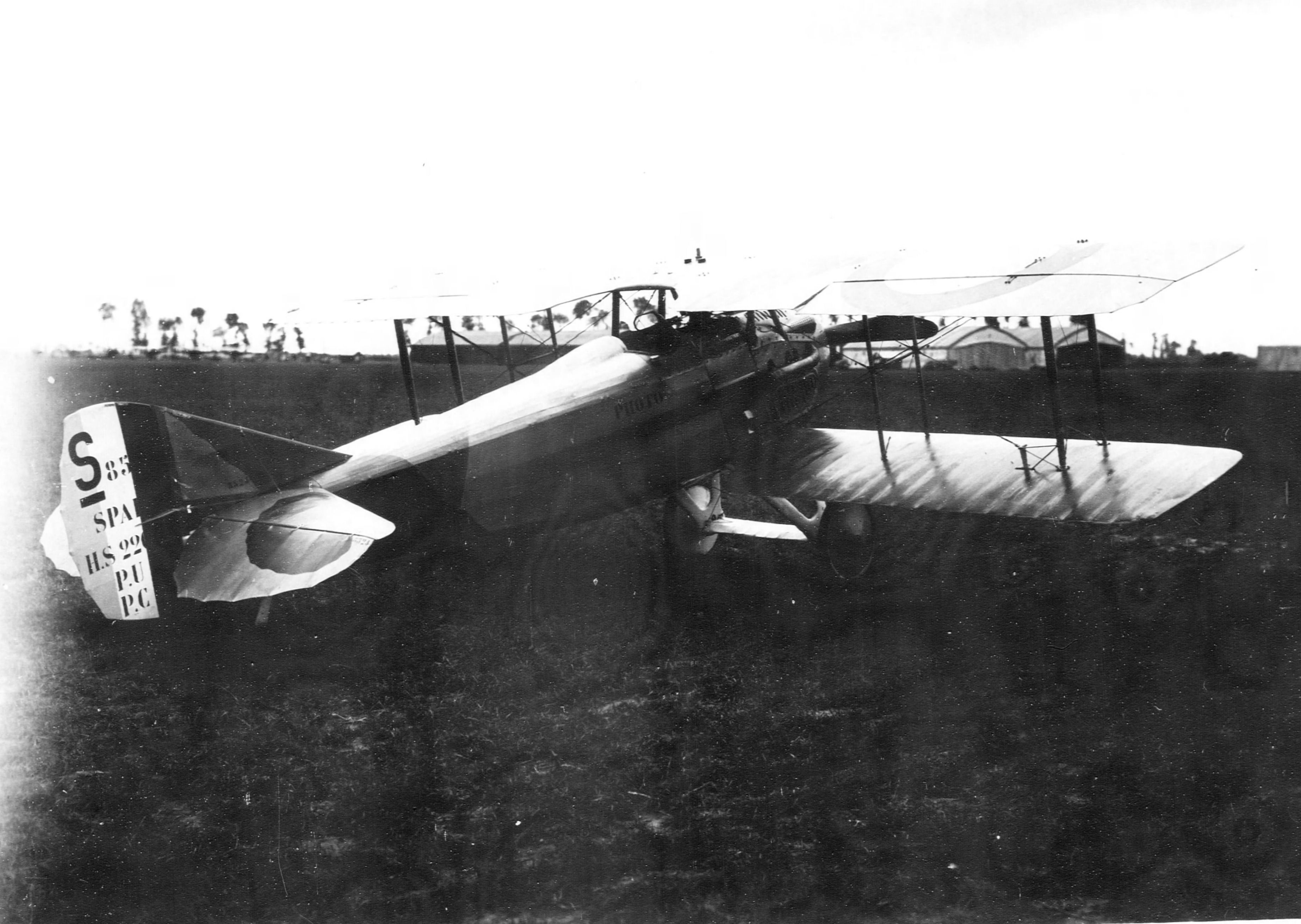
SPAD S.XIII, the most numerically important French fighter

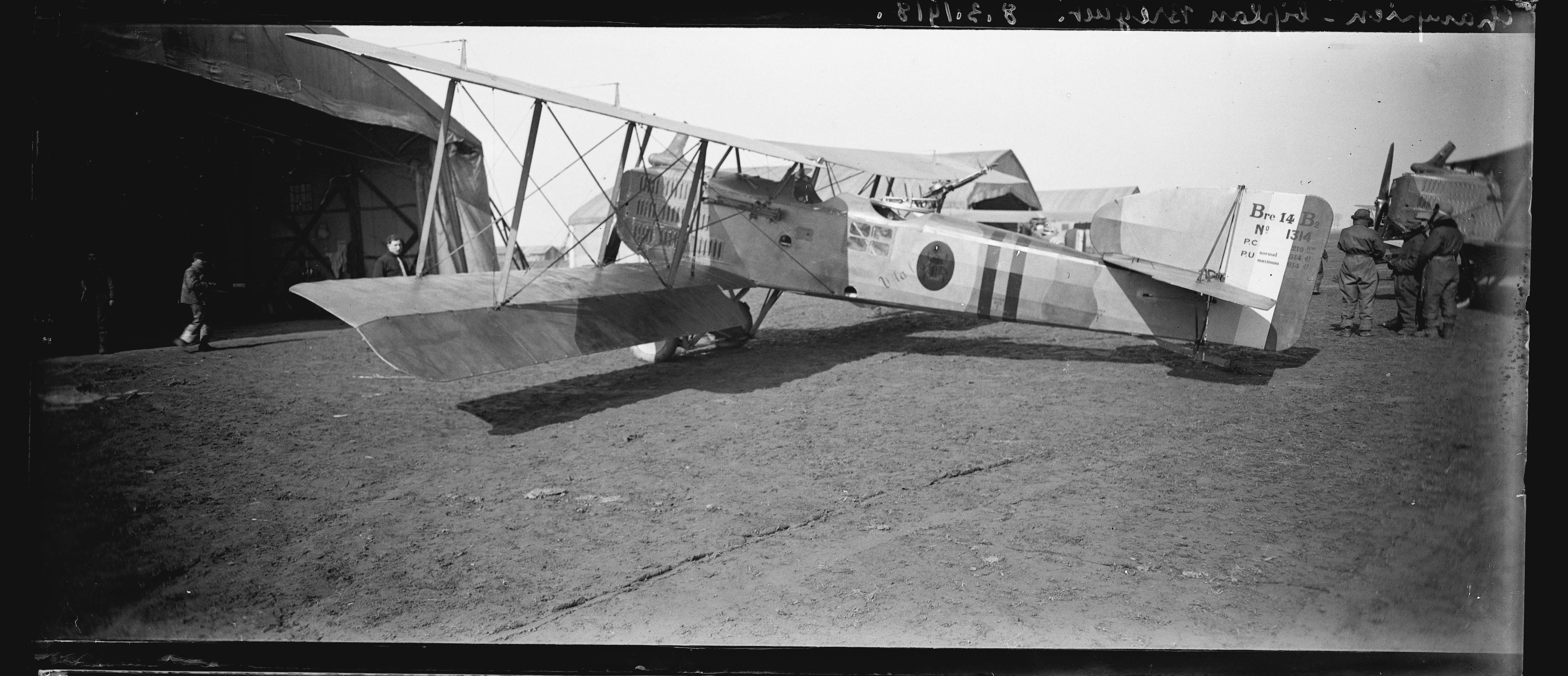
1918 Breguet 14 reconnaissance bomber

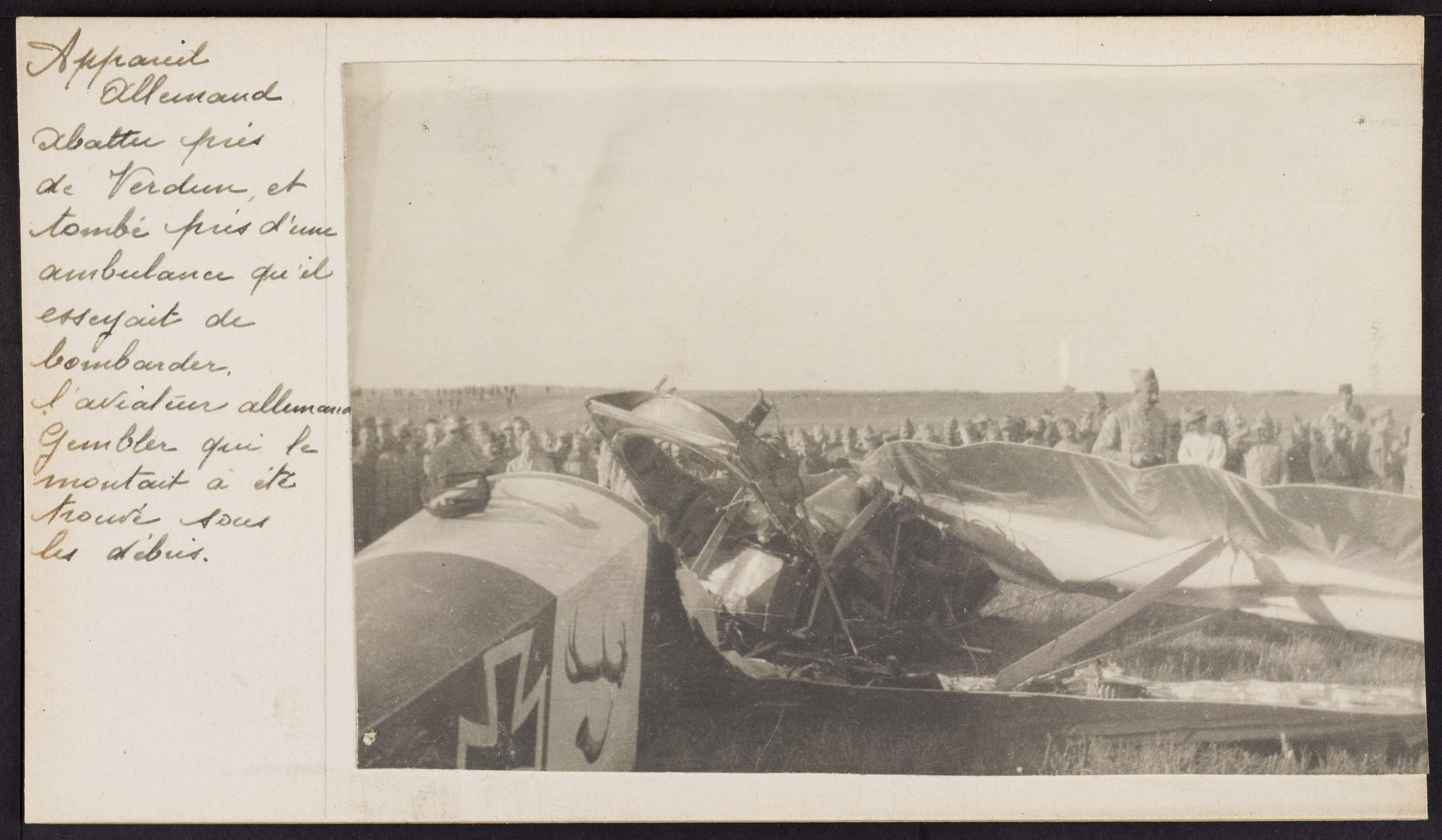
Crashed German AEG J.I aeroplane at Verdun France; 7-10-1917 Albrecht Gembler & Fritz Sagner FA(A) 254 downed near Ville-sur- Cousances by Sgt. (Felix) Gohier (Escadrille N. 85).

At the start of the First World War ("La Première Guerre mondiale"), France led the world in an aircraft design and by mid-1912 the Aéronautique Militaire had five squadrons ("escadrilles"). This had grown to 132 machines and 21 escadrilles by 1914, the same year when, on 21 February, it formally received a budget under the Ministry of War ("Ministère de la Guerre"). On 3 August, Germany declared war against France.

At the beginning of what eventually became known as First World War, the Aéronautique Militaire concentrated on reconnaissance with aircraft like the Blériot XI. On 8 October, though, the commander-in-chief, General Barès, proposed a massive expansion to 65 escadrilles. Furthermore, he proposed that four types of aircraft could be used for four different tasks: Morane-Saulnier Ls would be used as scouts, Voisin IIIs as bombers, Farman MF.11s as reconnaissance aircraft, and Caudron G.IIIs as artillery spotters.

On October 5, 1914, Sergent Joseph Franz and his mechanic Caporal Louis Quénault became the first to shoot down another aircraft when they downed a German Aviatik. However, air fighting was revolutionized when a reconnaissance pilot, Roland Garros, mounted a Hotchkiss machine gun on the cowling of his Morane-Saulnier L with a mechanical interrupter mechanism. The inconsistent firing rate of the Hotchkiss prevented the mechanism from working properly and he added deflector wedges to the rear of the propeller blades, so that the wooden propeller would not be shot to pieces whenever he opened fire on German aircraft. With this setup, Garros became the world's first fighter pilot, but he was captured shortly afterwards when his engine failed.

Independently, Anthony Fokker succeeded when he fitted a Fokker M.5K Eindecker (monoplane) with a Parabellum MG14 machine gun equipped with a gun synchronizer by the start of July 1915, thus changing the way in which the air war was fought, as German and Allied fighter aircraft fought each other in the air, producing "ace" pilots. Some prominent French aces were René Fonck, who became the top-scoring Allied pilot of World War I with 75 enemy aircraft shot down, Georges Guynemer, who was killed after 54 victories, Charles Nungesser, who achieved 43 victories and survived the war, and Georges Madon who had 41 victories.

Prior to 1916, escadrilles operated a variety of different types of aircraft together to accomplish specific assigned tasks with the first fighters being distributed piecemeal to each escadrille. This type of organization was common at the time. In 1916, as a result of their failure to achieve aerial supremacy over the Battle of Verdun and the inability of the reconnaissance aircraft to track German movements, Charles de Tricornot de Rose grouped the new Nieuport 11 fighters into dedicated fighter units, so they could operate together more effectively. This so revolutionized air combat that the Germans were forced to follow suit shortly thereafter.

During this period the Lafayette Escadrille (designated N.124) was formed around a group of mainly American volunteers while their parent country remained neutral. Initially operating a mixture of Nieuport 11s, 16s and 17s, when the SPAD S.XIII entered service, they would be redesignated S.124. The entry of the United States into the war resulted in most of their surviving personnel would be transferred to the U.S. Army Air Service (USAAS) in February 1918. The unit's leading ace was French-born American Raoul Lufbery, who shot down 16 enemy aircraft (all but one with the Escadrille) prior to his death in action on 19 May 1918. Other American volunteer pilots, including the first black fighter pilot, Eugene Bullard, flew with regular French Aéronautique Militaire escadrilles.

By April 1917, the Aéronautique Militaire had 2,870 aircraft with 60 fighter and 20 bomber squadrons and 400 observation aircraft, yet, by October, an even more radical expansion to over 300 squadrons was proposed. By May 1918, over 600 fighters and bombers came under the command of the Division Aérienne. Two months later, long-range reconnaissance squadrons had been formed. At the armistice, the Aéronautique Militaire had some 3,222 front-line combat aircraft on the Western Front, making it the world's largest air force. During the war the Aéronautique Militaire claimed 2,049 enemy aircraft and 357 balloons destroyed, for some 3,500 killed in action, 3,000 wounded/missing and 2,000 killed in accidents. Some 182 pilots of the Aéronautique Militaire were deemed flying aces for having scored five or more air-to-air victories.

== 1918–1939 ==
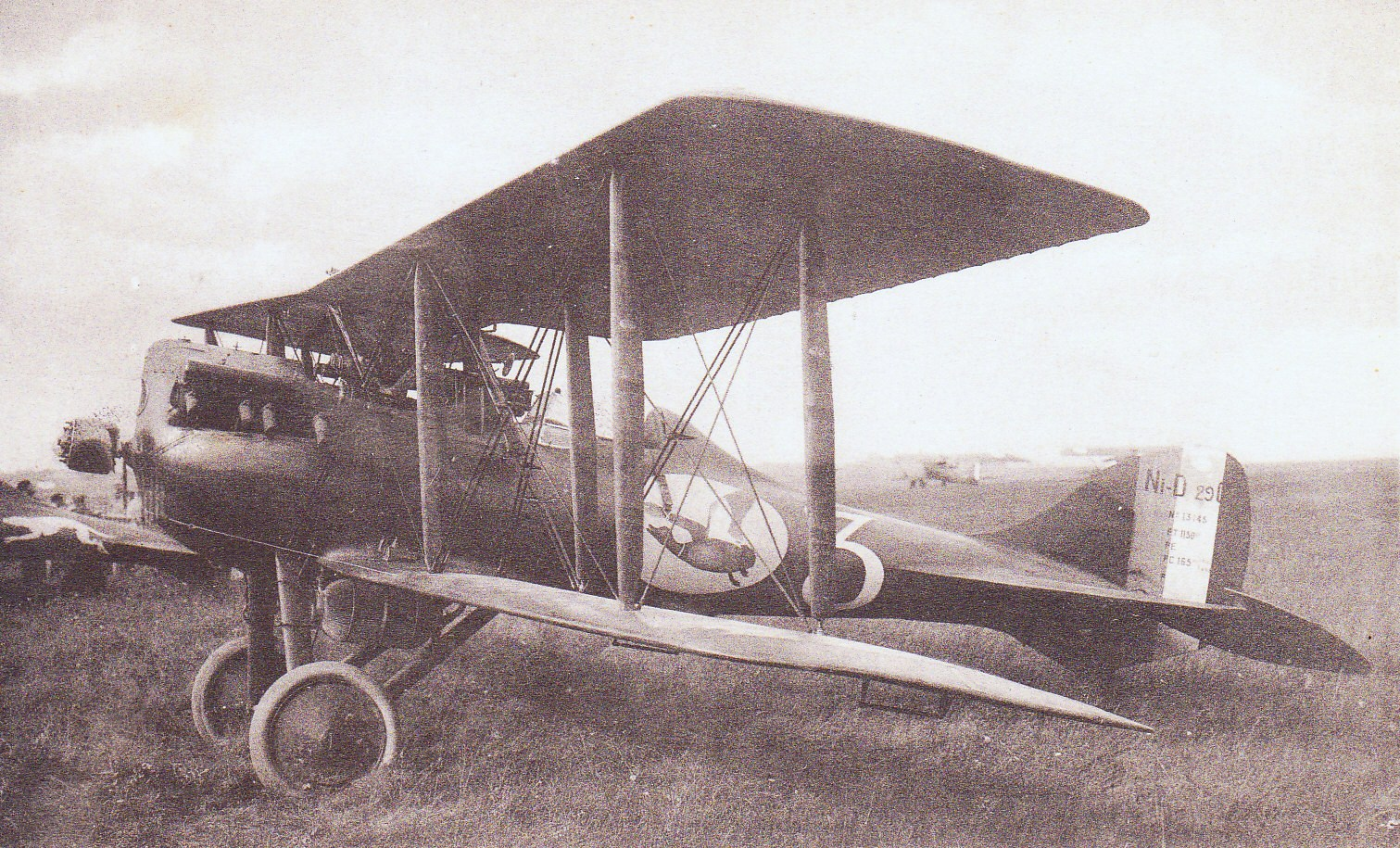
Nieuport-Delage NiD.29 C.1 fighter used in the early post-WW1 period.

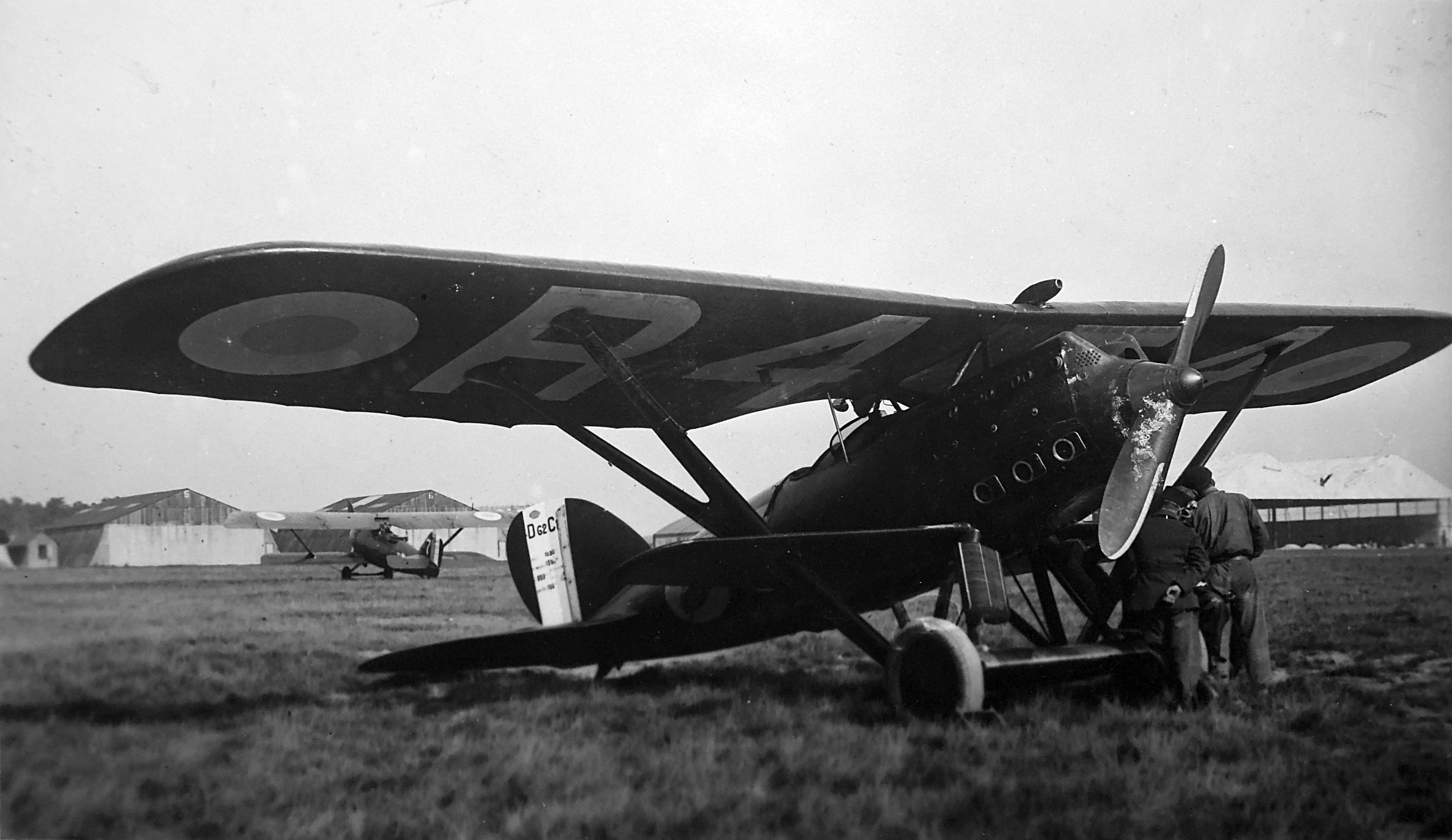
Nieuport-Delage NiD.62 C.1 fighter, mainstay of the Armée de l'Air in the late 20s and early 30s.

The end of war may have brought peace to France, yet the country itself and its infrastructure had been ravaged by four years of warfare, and the scars left behind were not just physical. As a result, it took some time for industry to recover. Not unexpectedly, orders for military aeroplanes dropped after the Armistice, resulting in reductions being made to squadron strengths.

France had a Colonial empire extending around the globe, and it needed to be defended. Anti-Government elements in French Morocco were clamouring to expel the French. On 27 April 1925, therefore, alongside tactical and logistical support, air operations in Morocco were begun owing to the Rif War and they were to continue until December 1934.

In the 1930s, the French aeronautical industry was primarily composed of small companies such as Latécoère, Morane-Saulnier, Nieuport-Delage and Amiot, each only producing small numbers of aircraft. As a result, the French aeronautical industry proved itself incapable of delivering the aircraft that the annual fiscal budgets had called for which had been greatly increased as a result of Hitler coming to power in January 1933 and his remilitarization of Germany in defiance of the Allies and the Treaty of Versailles.

Pierre Cot, the secretary of the French Air Force, decreed that national security was too important for the production of warplanes to be left in the hands of the private enterprises that were thus far failing to meet production goals. In July 1936 the French government began nationalizing many of the larger aircraft companies, creating six state-owned companies, which encompassed the majority of aeronautical production, and regrouping those companies to their geographical regions. Bloch was nationalized in January 1937. However, the aircraft engine industry, even as it proved incapable of providing the badly needed powerful engines, escaped nationalization.

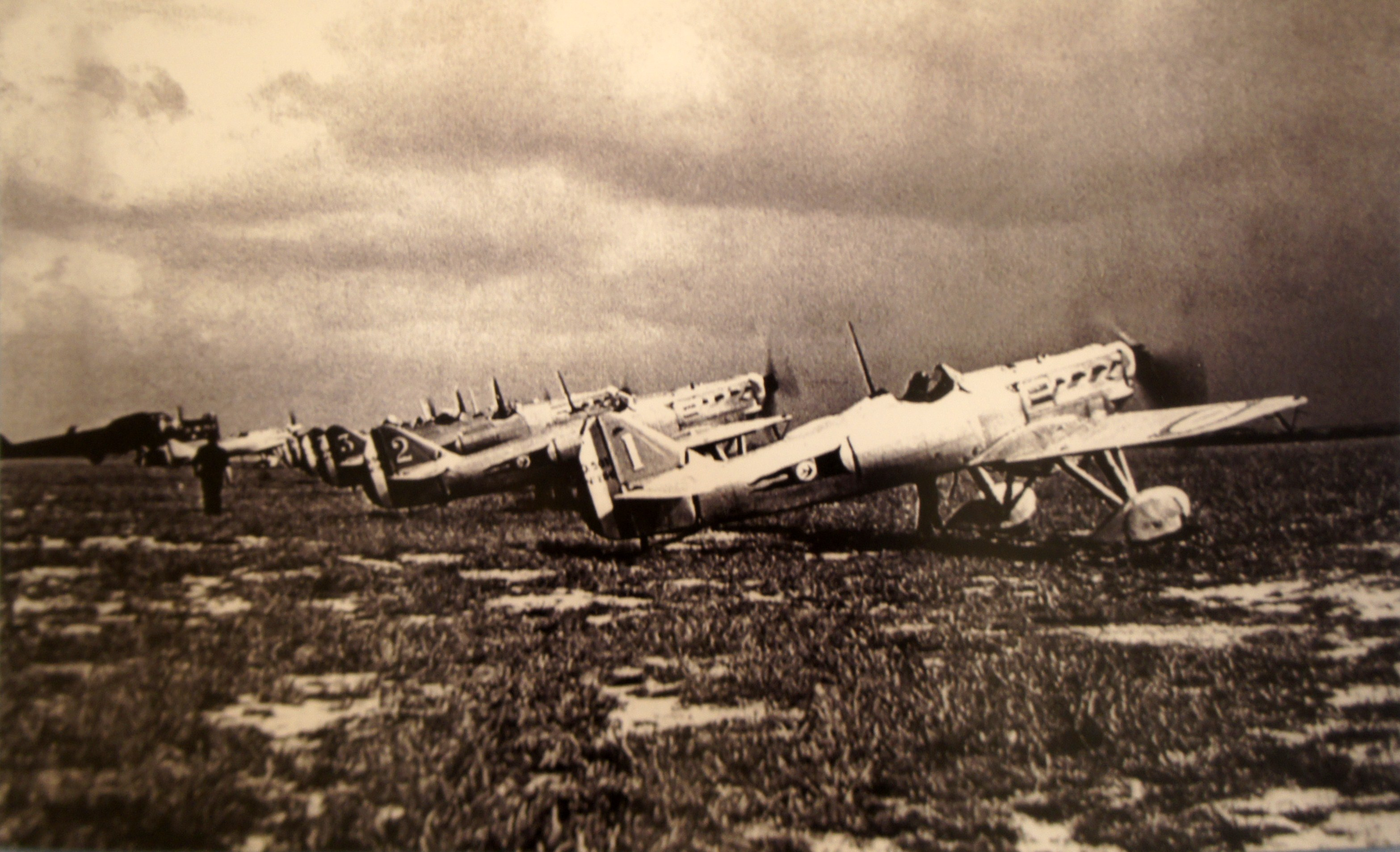
Dewoitine D.510 monoplane fighters from the mid-1930s

By 1937, it was clear that more modern aircraft were needed, since the air force was still flying relatively antiquated aircraft like the Dewoitine D.500 and orders to construct more than 2,500 modern machines, among them the Bloch MB.170 bomber and the Dewoitine D.520 fighter resulted. The inadequacy of the French aeronautical programs, as well as indecision in high command resulted in the French Air Force being in a position of weakness, confronting a modern and well organized Luftwaffe, which had just gained combat experience in the Spanish Civil War.

France attempted to respond to the likelihood of another European war via an intensive re-equipment and modernization program in 1938–39, as did other countries desperately in need of new aircraft including Poland whose 1939 orders of 160 MS-406 fighters from France still hadn't been delivered by the German invasion of Poland. Germany production outstripped that of its neighbours, so it was a question of "too little, too late" as far as the French – as well as the whole continent of Europe – were concerned.

An attempt was made to purchase the latest American bombers and fighters – or at least fighter planes. American planes were 50% more expensive than French models, and no superior models were for sale. U.S. law required cash purchases, and the French finance ministry opposed using its gold reserves for this purpose. French labor unions refused to lengthen its 40-hour week, and were strongly opposed to imports that would reverse the growth of jobs in the French defense industry. In any case, the American aviation industry was too small and too committed to orders from American forces to be of any help. Inevitably, the French industrial response fell far behind the German threat. The British aircraft industry was working all out to rearm British forces.

== September 1939 – June 1940 ==
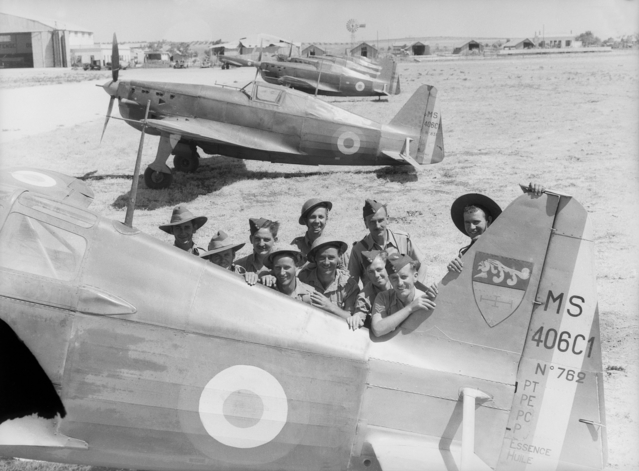
Morane-Saulnier MS.406 fighters

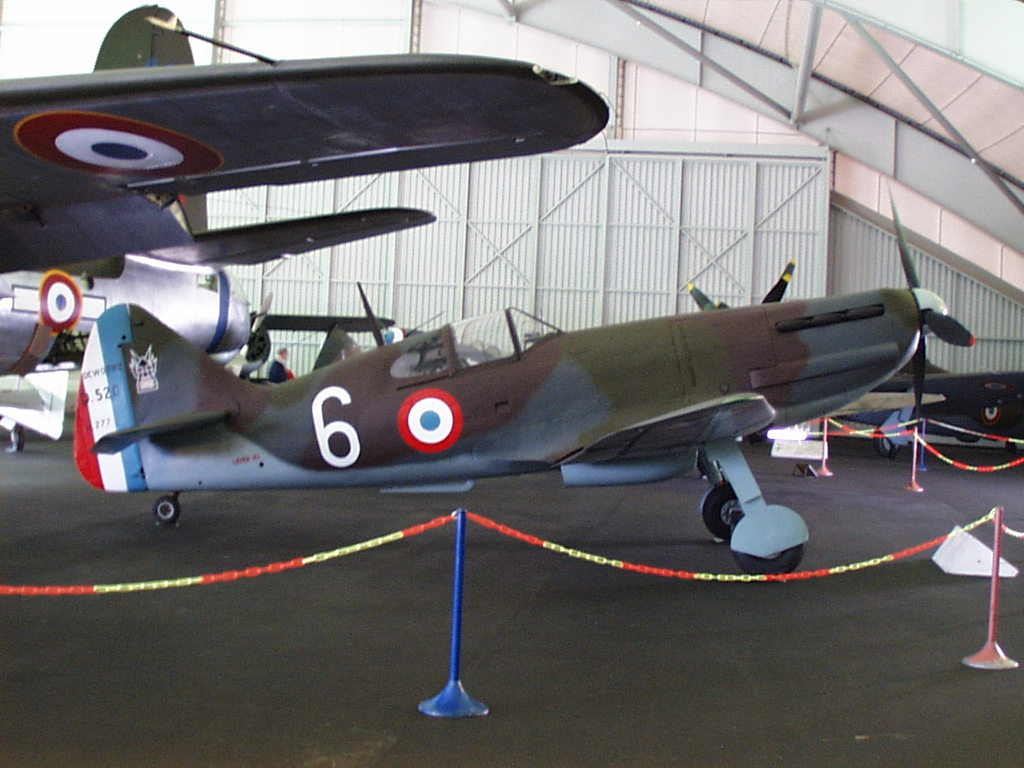
Dewoitine D.520 fighter

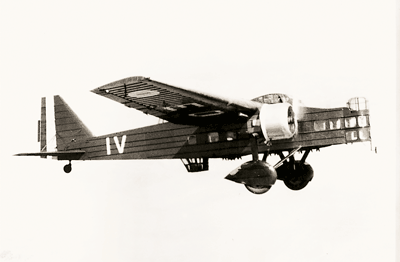
Bloch MB.200 bomber

A re-organisation of the air force took place during September 1939. Prior to the reshuffle, the basic unit structure consisted of two Escadrilles (Squadron) forming a Groupe, extending to multiple Groupes (normally two or more), forming an Escadre. Following the re-organisation an 'Escadre' became a 'Groupement' Groupement de Bombardement No.6 formed a part of the bomber contingent of Zone D'Opérations Aériennes Nord or ZOAN [lit. trans. 'Air Operations North']. ZOAN was one of four geographically distinct areas of command. The others, comprising; Zone D'Opérations Aériennes Sud ZOAS, Zone D'Opérations Aériennes Est ZOAE and Zone D'Opérations Aériennes Alps ZOAA, were responsible for the Southern, Eastern and Alpine regions of the French mainland respectively. The national divisions these areas represented were drawn up to correspond to the boundaries of defence responsibility for French army groups. Zone D'Opérations Aériennes Nord was responsible for the air cover and protection of the most Northern regions of France. Two units of bomber squadrons fell within the command of Groupement de Bombardement No.6; Groupe de Bombardement I/12 and Groupe de Bombardement II/12. The Officer Commanding Groupement de Bombardement No.6 was Colonel Lefort. Headquarters were at Soissons in the Picardy Region of north-east France. The existence of the entire revised Armée de L’Air organisational structure was short-lived.

When the war began the Armée de l'Air suffered from disorganisation in government, armed forces and industry which had led to only 826 fighters and 250 bombers to be anything like combat-ready. Many more aircraft were not ready because of shortages of equipment and components, machine-guns had not been calibrated and some bombers lacked bomb-sights when they were delivered to squadrons. The French had no comparable organisation to the Air Transport Auxiliary (ATA) and front-line pilots in France became responsible for ferrying new aircraft from factories to the squadrons, temporarily depleting front-line strength.

On 10 May 1940, the Germans had more aircraft and many aircrews were veterans of the war in Spain. French inter-service rivalry led a Potez reconnaissance aircraft crew, which had spotted a huge concentration of Panzers and supporting infantry units concealed in the Ardennes forests two days after the start of the invasion, not being believed by the army commanders who refused to act on what they called air force scaremongering.

The Armée de l'Air was beset by obsolete strategy, tactics, aircraft, weapons and even in communications, and the lack of equipment owing to "technical problems." Both became apparent when the Germans advanced swiftly through France and Belgium. On 11 May, nearly 20 French bombers and over 30 British fighter escorts were shot down attacking German crossings over the Meuse river. French fighter and bomber strength was rapidly depleted in May as Luftwaffe fighters and Flak shot down aircraft, which attacked the advancing Germans. Squadrons were often out of contact with any French army units they supposedly supported, partly due to the poor coordination of communication between the army and the air force and partly to the outdated, unreliable army communications equipment being used.

As it became clear that the war was lost for France, the high command ordered what remained of the Armée de l’Air to French colonies in North Africa to continue the fight, such that Armée de l’Air units were stationed at places like Alger-Maison-Blanche and Oran in Algeria, Meknes in Morocco, and Rayak in Lebanon. The Vichy government ordered the dissolution of many air force squadrons, including the fighter unit designated GC II/4, nicknamed Les Petits Poucets. GC II/4 had been formed at Rheims in May 1939, then moved to Xaffévilliers by the start of the war. It flew US-built Curtiss H-75A Hawk fighters, with which the unit claimed the first two French air victories on 8 September 1939, two Bf 109s of I/JG 53. Just 17 days later, it lost its commanding officer, Captain Claude, in combat, yet the pilots were especially shocked to discover that his body had been discovered with two bullets in the head, suggesting that a German pilot may have murdered him after bailing out of his aeroplane.

At dawn on 10 May 1940, the day of the German invasion, Luftwaffe aircraft attacked the air base at Xaffévilliers, destroying six Hawks. By 15 May, GC II/4 was down to seven operational aircraft, which shot down a Heinkel He 111 bomber, four Bf 109s and possibly a Henschel Hs 126 observation aircraft for no loss. The good luck continued for GC II/4 when four enemy aircraft were destroyed the next day for no loss. Unfortunately, the aforementioned state of chaos with regard to preparing France for war was still evident when some GC II/4 pilots were shocked to discover that new Curtiss H-75A-3s being prepared at Châteaudun had vital equipment missing – including radios.

On 16 June, GC II/4 lost its second commanding officer in nine months when Commandant (Major) Borne took off on a reconnaissance sortie near Châtillon-sur-Seine and was shot down by three Bf 109s. The next day, nine unserviceable Curtisses were set on fire by ground crews at Dun-sur-Auron before 23 remaining were flown to Meknès in Morocco. GC II/4 was disbanded on 25 August 1940, having been credited with 14 aircraft shot down during the Drôle de guerre and another 37 after the invasion, for the loss of eight pilots killed, seven wounded and one taken prisoner.

Figures for aircraft losses during the Battle of France are still debated, although it is reasonable to suggest that the French did inflict considerable losses on the Germans. General Albert Kesselring reflected that Luftwaffe effectiveness had been reduced to almost 30 percent of what it had been before the invasion of France. The armistice of 22 June 1940 did not necessarily mean the end of the war for French pilots, those who escaped from France fought on in the Royal Air Force, ultimately the Free French Forces (Forces Françaises Libres) and the Armée de l'Air under RAF Bomber Command and those who remained flew for the French Armistice Air Force on behalf of the Vichy government.

== Vichy: June 1940 – December 1942 ==
In a parallel of what had happened to Germany after World War I, the French government, now with its seat moved to Vichy, was forced by the Germans to accept its terms for a reduced army and navy, both of which would be only strong enough to maintain order in France and in its colonies. (It is of interest to note that France was allowed to keep her colonies, whereas Germany had been forced to cede all of hers under the terms of the Treaty of Versailles, signed in June 1919.) Germany ordered that, with regard to the warplanes that had survived the Battle of France, including those now stationed in Tunisia, Algeria and Morocco, they were to be surrendered, either in whole or else already disassembled, if not destroyed altogether – again a parallel of what had happened to Germany's air force in 1919.

However, Vichy's air force was spared (for the moment) from non-existence owing to the consequences of an event which would damage, if not completely change, the relationship between occupied France and free Britain. Winston Churchill had no intention of allowing the French Navy's capital ships to remain intact so long as there was any chance of them essentially becoming adjuncts of the Kriegsmarine (German navy). The last thing he wanted was for the Kriegsmarine to bolstered enough to attempt an invasion of Britain.

He implemented the plan – codenamed "Operation Catapult" – for a British fleet, coded "Force H" and based in Gibraltar, to sail to the harbour of Mers-el-Kébir, near Oran in Algeria, where four capital ships and other vessels were stationed, in order to persuade Admiral Marcel-Bruno Gensoul to disobey orders from Vichy and have his vessels sail either to British waters or else to those of French colonies in the Far East or even to the (still neutral) USA with a view to preventing them from being used against the Allies. The overture was soundly rejected, so Royal Navy Admiral James Somerville gave the orders to destroy the French vessels. More than 2,000 sailors allegedly died in the attack, carried out on 3 July 1940, which saw one battleship sunk and two others severely damaged. The incident predictably stunned the French and gave the Germans a golden propaganda tool to discredit the British as France's real enemies.

Vichy and Berlin agreed, if reluctantly, that the Armée de l'Air de Vichy (as it is termed) was still needed in case French interests were to be attacked by the British once again – and, of course, for attacking the British themselves. Goering ordered that all Armée de l'Air aircraft would now be identified by special markings on the fuselage and tailplane of each one. Initially, the rear fuselage and tailplane (excluding the rudder) were painted a bright yellow, but the markings were later changed so that they consisted of horizontally-oriented red and yellow stripes. In all cases, French national markings (roundel on the fuselage and tricolor on the tailplane) were retained as before.

Nearly three months afterwards, on 23 September 1940, the Vichy air force saw action again when the British tried to take Dakar, the capital of Senegal, after a failed attempt (as at Mers-el-Kébir) to persuade the French to join the Allied cause against the Axis. This time, however, the French managed to repulse the British torpedo-bomber attacks launched from the carrier HMS Ark Royal during several days of fighting with only light casualties on their side.

Syrian-based Vichy air force units saw action against the British from April 1941, when a coup d'état in Iraq briefly installed the nationalist Rashid Ali Al-Gaylani as prime minister in order to secure the vital oil supplies at Kirkuk (under British control since 1934) in northeastern Iraq for the pro-Axis nationalists who wanted the British to be expelled from the country. However, the RAF base at Habbaniya withstood the nationalists, and in May the British, Indian and Commonwealth "Iraqforce" invaded Iraq via Basra. The ensuing Anglo-Iraqi War ended with Iraqforce defeating the nationalists at the end of May and restoring a pro-Allied government in Iraq.

Allied operations during the Anglo-Iraqi War included attacks on Vichy air force bases in Lebanon and Syria, which served as staging posts for Regia Aeronautica and Luftwaffe units flying to Mosul to support the Iraqi nationalist coup. Then in June 1941 British, Commonwealth, Empire and Free French forces invaded Syria and Lebanon. Vichy French air units, some of which were equipped with Dewoitine D.520 fighters and US-built Martin Maryland bombers had initial air superiority, but the Allied invaders inflicted heavy casualties on Vichy air and ground forces. By mid-July the Allied invasion was victorious and put Syria and Lebanon under Free French control.

== Operation Torch: November 8–10, 1942 ==
The last major battles against the Allied forces, in which the Vichy French air force took part, took place during Operation Torch, launched on 8 November 1942 as the Allied invasion of North Africa. Facing the U.S. Navy task force headed for Morocco, consisting of the carriers Ranger, Sangamon, Santee and Suwannee, were, in part, Vichy squadrons based at Marrakesh, Meknès, Agadir, Casablanca and Rabat, which between them could muster some 86 fighters and 78 bombers. Overall, the aircraft may have been old compared to the Grumman F4F Wildcats of the U.S. Navy, yet they were still dangerous and capable in the hands of combat veterans who had seen action against both the Germans and the British since the start of the war.

Wildcats attacked the airfield at Rabat-Salé around 07.30 on the 8th and destroyed nine LeO 451 bombers of GB I/22, while a transport unit's full complement of various types was almost entirely wiped out. At Casablanca, Douglas SBD Dauntless dive-bombers succeeded in damaging the French battleship Jean Bart, and Wildcats strafed the bombers of GB I/32 at Camp Cazes airfield, some of which exploded as they were ready for take-off with bombs already on board, thus ensuring their mission never went ahead. The U.S. Navy did not have it all their own way, though, as several Wildcat pilots were shot down and taken prisoner.

The day's victory tally of enemy aircraft shot down by the French fighter pilots totaled seven confirmed and three probable, yet their losses were considered heavy – five pilots killed, four wounded and 13 aircraft destroyed either in combat or on the ground – when one considers that GC II/5, based in Casablanca, had lost only two pilots killed during the whole of the six-week campaign in France two years before. In the meantime, Wildcats of U.S. Navy Fighter Squadron VF-41 from Ranger strafed and destroyed three U.S.-built Douglas DB-7 bombers of GB I/32, which were being refueled and rearmed at Casablanca, leaving three others undamaged.

Nevertheless, having been reinforced by two other bombers, GB I/32 carried out a bombing mission against the beaches at Safi, where more U.S. soldiers were landing, the next morning. One of the bombers was damaged and attempted to make a forced landing, only it exploded upon contact with the ground, killing the entire crew. Fighter unit GC I/5 lost four pilots in combat that day (9 November) and it was on that same day that Adjudant (Warrant Officer) Bressieux had the distinction of becoming the last pilot in the Vichy French air force to claim a combat victory, in this case a Wildcat of VF-9. Shortly afterwards, 13 Wildcats attacked the airfield at Médiouna and destroyed a total of 11 French aircraft, including six from GC II/5.

On the morning of 10 November 1942, the Vichy French air force units in Morocco had a mere 37 combat-ready fighters and 40 bombers left to face the might of the U.S. Navy Wildcats. Médiouna was attacked once again and several of the fighters were left burning, while two reconnaissance Potez were shot down, one by an F4F Wildcat and the other by an SBD Dauntless over the airfield at Chichaoua, where three Wildcats would later destroy four more Potez in a strafing attack.

Ultimately, the presence of Vichy France in North Africa as an ally of the Germans came to an end on Armistice Day, 11 November 1942, when General Noguès, the commander-in-chief of the Vichy armed forces, requested a ceasefire; that did not stop a unit of U.S. Navy aircraft from attacking the airfield at Marrakesh and destroying several French aircraft, apparently on the initiative of the unit's commander. Once the ceasefire request was accepted, the war between the Allies and the Vichy French came to an end, after two and a half years of what was termed "fratricidal" fighting.

Torch had resulted in a victory for the Allies, even though it was fair to say that the French had no choice but to engage the Americans, otherwise the Americans would (and did) engage them since they were technically enemies. As a result, 12 air force and 11 navy pilots lost their lives in the final four days of combat between (Vichy) France and the Allies during World War II. Barely two weeks later, the Germans invaded the then-unoccupied zone of metropolitan France and ordered the complete dissolution of the Vichy French armed forces on 1 December 1942. Those units then not under Vichy control would then be free to join with their Free French colleagues to fight the common enemy: Nazi Germany.

== See also ==
- Lafayette Escadrille
- List of military aircraft of France
- List of aircraft of the French Air Force during World War II
- World War I
- French colonial flags
- French Colonial Empire
- List of French possessions and colonies
