= Raoul Echard =

French flying ace

Raoul Cesar Robert Pierre Echard
- Born: 28 September 1888; Rouen, France
- Died: 7 September 1922 (aged 33); Bodio
- Burial place: Bonsecours, France
- Military career
- Allegiance: France
- Branch: Aviation
- Rank: Capitaine
- Units: Escadrille 26, Escadrille 82, Escadrille 22
- Awards: Legion d'Honneur, Croix de Guerre

Capitaine Raoul Cesar Robert Pierre Echard was a World War I flying ace credited with seven aerial victories.

== Biography ==
Raoul Cesar Robert Pierre Echard was born at Rouen, France on 28 September 1888.

Although it is not known just when he began his mandatory military service, he was serving as a Brigadier by 15 October 1908. After further promotions in the enlisted ranks, on 16 May 1910, he was chosen to be an Aspirant. This led to officer's training, and promotion to Sous lieutenant. He was serving in an infantry regiment when World War I began. On 1 October 1915, he was promoted to Lieutenant. He was sent to pilot's training on 6 January 1916. He graduated with his Military Pilot's Brevet on 17 May. After advanced training, he was assigned to Escadrille 26 on 7 August 1916.

On 25 January 1917, he was transferred to command Escadrille 82. Between 18 March and 3 May, he shot down four German airplanes. On 13 May, he was promoted to Capitaine, and on the 22nd he was inducted into the Legion d'honneur. He shot down two more enemy airplanes, as well as an observation balloon during 1918. He ended World War I with a Croix de Guerre with six palms to go with his Legion of Honor.

He died 1922 in an Air meeting starting from Zurich. After two steps of the "circuit des Alpes", his Spad crashed in a wood near Bodio, Switzerland, where he was found dead.

== Honors and awards ==
He received the Legion d'Honneur and the Croix de Guerre for his valor. The award citation of his Légion d'honneur mentions :

During World War I, the officer was credited with transforming a newly formed escadrille into a combat unit, within a month of its establishment. On 3 May 1917, he downed his third enemy plane in our lines. Cited twice in orders.

== List of aerial victories ==
See also Aerial victory standards of World War I

No.	Date/time	Aircraft	Foe	Result	Location	Notes
1	18 March 1917		German two-seater	Destroyed	west of Altkirch	
2	1 May 1917		EA	Destroyed		
3	3 May 1917		EA	Destroyed	Moosch	Victory shared with François de Boigne
4	5 May 1917		EA	Destroyed		
5	18 March 1918		EA	Destroyed	Asiago	
6	14 June 1918		Fokker Dr.I	Destroyed	Cernay-les-Reims, France	
7	25 August 1918		Balloon	Destroyed	Concevreux, France	
