= Le Prieur rocket =

French WWI air-to-air rocket

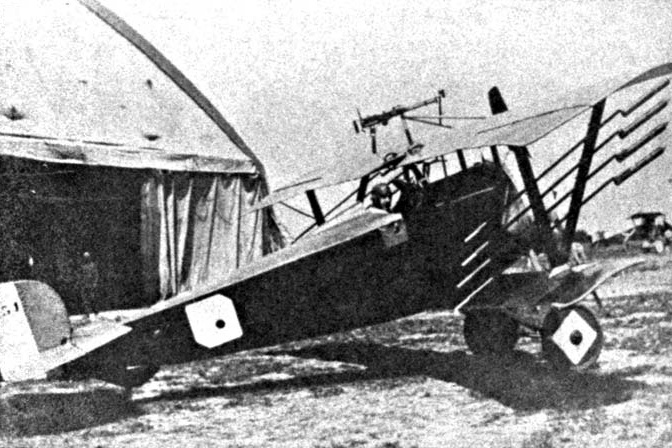
Nieuport 16 equipped with Le Prieur rockets

Le Prieur rockets (French Fusées Le Prieur) were a type of incendiary air-to-air rocket used in World War I against observation balloons and airships. They were invented by the French lieutenant Yves Le Prieur and were first used in the Battle of Verdun in May 1916. Due to great inaccuracy their range was limited to about 115 metres (126 yards).

== Development ==
The Le Prieur rocket was essentially a cardboard tube filled with 200 grams of black powder with a wooden conical head attached (by doped paper or linen tape) and had a triangular knife blade inserted in a slot across its apex forming a spear point. A square-section wooden stick (usually pine) was taped to the rocket with about 3.0 metres (9.8 feet) extending back from the base of the rocket and fitted snugly into a launch tube attached to the aircraft's inter-plane struts.

As top French military officers had expressed concerns about a fire hazard for the attacking aircraft, Yves Le Prieur first experimented with his weapon by fitting one on a short section of a Voisin aircraft wing bolted on a Piccard Pictet (Pic-Pic) automobile (one of the few period cars with a genuine 120-kilometre-per-hour (75 mph) capability). As the tests went on with full success, the weapon was soon put into active service.

== Method of use ==
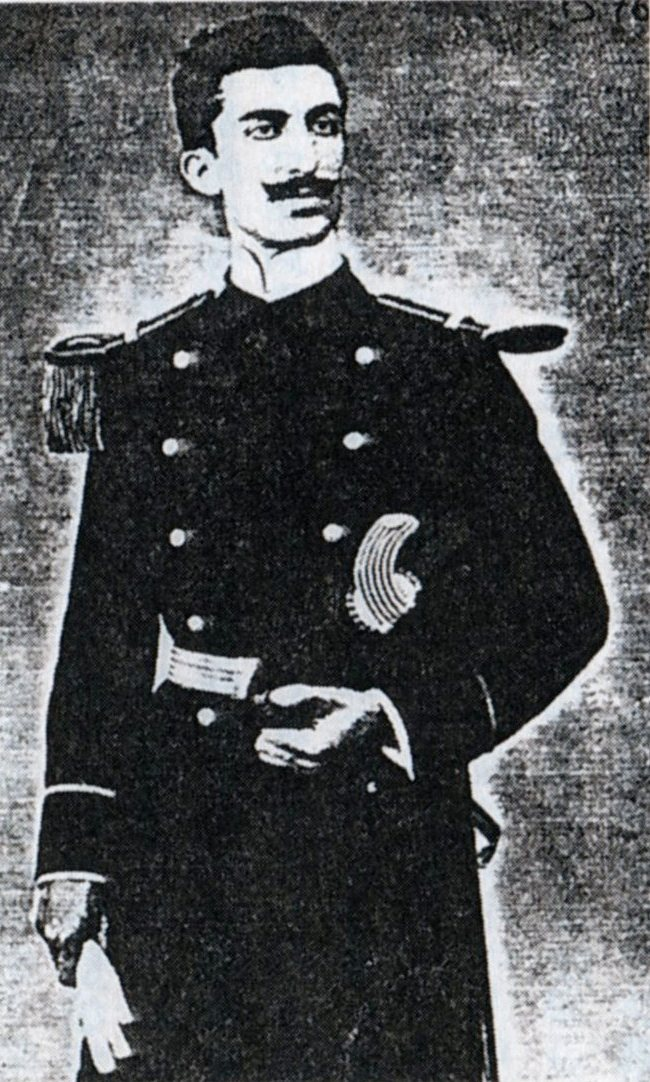
Yves Le Prieur

The rockets were fired electrically from the interplane struts supporting the wings of biplanes via a cockpit switch. The switch launched all the rockets consecutively. The rockets were generally fired at a range of 100–150 metres with the aircraft at an inclined dive angle of 45 degrees. The steeper the dive the straighter the trajectory and the more accurate the attack. Attacks were made in the direction of the length of the balloon and against the wind, the pilot taking aim via the plane's existing gun-sight. However, the ignition and discharge of each rocket did not occur immediately and a delay varied slightly from one rocket to another. Thus the pilot had to continue to hold the target in his gun-sight and the dive continued until the last rocket discharged.

They were successfully used against German Drachen kite balloons, but never managed to bring down a Zeppelin, although they were used to defend the United Kingdom from Zeppelin raids. In their first operational deployment, eight aces including Nungesser, Guiguet and Chaput were specially trained by Le Prieur in their use, and in an early morning attack on 22 May 1916 while flying Nieuport 16, managed to down six balloons in short order, panicking the Germans into lowering the remainder along 100 km (62 mi) of the front lines, blinding the German Army for the first French counter-attack on Fort Douaumont. Le Prieurs were also occasionally used against ground targets, the first recorded instance of an air to ground rocket attack being on 29 June 1916, when a roving Nieuport 16 equipped with Le Prieur rockets found a large ammunition dump, and blew it up.

Users of the rockets included France, United Kingdom, Belgium, Italy and to a lesser extent, Germany. The use of rockets gradually declined through to 1918, because of the widespread use of incendiary bullets, which were effective against hydrogen-filled aerostats.

Aircraft that were armed with the rockets aside from the Nieuport 16 included the Nieuport 11, Nieuport 17, Nieuport 23, SPAD S.VII, SPAD S.XIII, Farman HF.20/21, B.E.2, B.E.12, Sopwith Baby, Sopwith Pup, Sopwith Camel, and others. Most aircraft were armed with eight rockets but the B.E.12 had ten and the SPAD S.VII had six.
