= Escadrille Spa.82 =

- Active: 1917–1918
- Country: France
- Branch: French Air Service
- Type: Fighter Squadron

Escadrille Spa.82 (also known as Escadrille N.82) was a French fighter squadron active during the First World War during 1917 and 1918. The squadron served, at various times, on the Western and Italian Fronts, as well as in Flanders. By war's end, the squadron was credited with 26 confirmed aerial victories.

== History ==
Escadrille Spa.82 (also known as Escadrille N.82) was formed in January 1917. It was outfitted with a variety of Nieuports and SPADs. It would not be operational until 7 July 1917, when it was tasked to III Armee. In November, it was transferred south to oppose both Romanian and Italian forces. In April 1918, the squadron was returned to the Western Front.

On 27 August 1918, Escadrille Spa.82 was one of four squadrons consolidated into Groupe de Combat 23. On 22 September, the Groupe moved to Flanders until the Armistice on 11 November 1918.

Escadrille Spa.82 was credited with destroying 26 enemy aircraft.

== Commanding officers ==
- Lieutenant Raoul Echard: January 1917 until mid-1918
- Lieutenant Marie Lecoq De Kerland: 6 June 1918 until war's end

== Notable members ==
- Lieutenant Raoul Echard
- Lieutenant Marie Lecoq De Kerland
- Lieutenant François de Boigne

== Aircraft ==
- An assortment of Nieuport and SPAD fighters.
