= François Pillon =

French philosopher

François Thomas Pillon (7 March 1830, Fontaines, Yonne – 9 December 1914, Paris) was a French philosopher.

Pillon was associated with the neo-critical school. He collaborated with Charles Bernard Renouvier in publishing the Critique philosophique and Critique religieuse. He founded the journal L'Année philosophique, and edited it from 1890 to 1913.

Pillon was the dedicatee of William James's Principles of Psychology.

== Works ==
- La Philosophie de Charles Secrétan (1898)
- (with Renouvier) a translation of Hume's Treatise on Human Nature
