= Escadrille Spa.68 =

- Active: 1915–1918
- Country: France
- Branch: French Air Service
- Type: Fighter Squadron

Escadrille Spa.68 (originally Escadrille N.68) was a French fighter squadron active from Autumn 1915 until the Armistice that ended World War I. It was equipped with a mixed lot of Nieuports until they were gradually replaced by SPADs in November 1917. The squadron was one of four bundled into Groupe de Combat 20 in February 1918. By war's end, Escadrille Spa.68 was credited with the destruction of 15 enemy aircraft.

== History ==
Escadrille Spa.68 was founded as Escadrille N.68. It was one of two early aviation units attached to the Cavalry Corps when it was supplied with Nieuports during September 1915. Equipment was a mixture of Nieuport 12s, Nieuport 16s, and Nieuport 27s.

By early 1917, it was attached to VIII Armee. It would spend the year with a steady turnover of aircraft types until it stabilized on SPAD S.7s and SPAD XIIs in November. Once outfitted with SPADs, the squadron was redesignated Escadrille Spa.68.

Toward the end of February 1918, the squadron was one of four that were combined to form Groupe de Combat 20. The squadron would fight as part of this larger unit until war's end. By that time, Escadrille Spa.68 was credited with the destruction of 15 German aircraft.

== Commanding officers ==
- Unknown: September 1915 - November 1916
- Capitaine Garde: November 1916 - Early 1917
- Capitaine Lemerle: Early 1917 - 16 June 1918
- Lieutenant Milliat: 16 June 1918 - war's end

== Notable member ==
Lieutenant: Pierre Gaudermen

== Aircraft ==
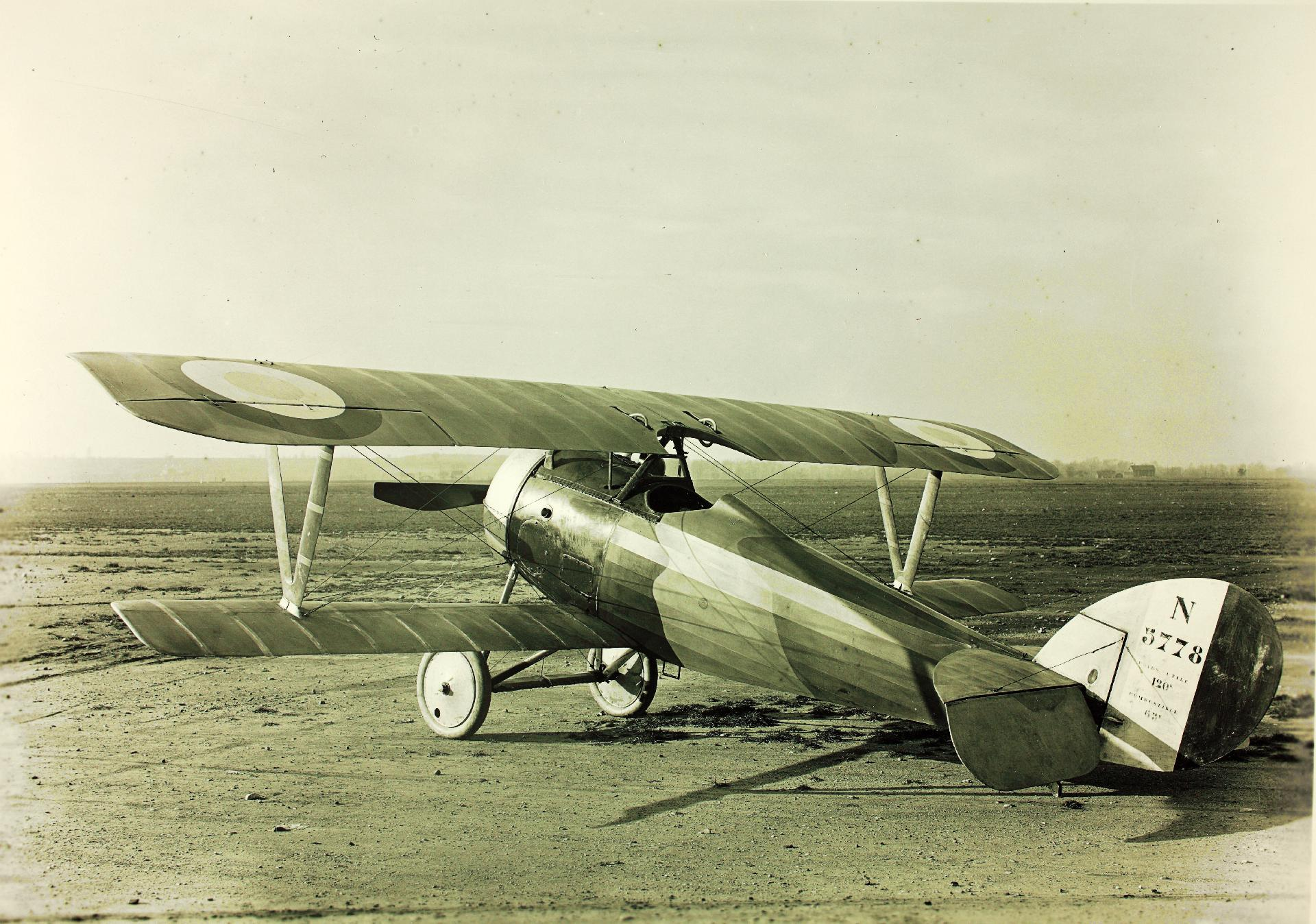
A Nieuport 27.

  - Nieuports (type unknown): September 1915
- Early 1917 inventory:
  - Nieuport 12s
  - Nieuport 16s
  - Nieuport 27s
- SPAD S.7s begin to arrive: March 1917
- June 1917 inventory:
  - SPAD S.7s
  - Nieuport 24s
- August 1917 inventory:
  - SPADs (type unknown)
  - Nieuport 24s
- November 1917 inventory:
  - SPAD S.7s
  - SPAD S.12
