= François de Boigne =

François Eugene Marie Antoine de Boigne
- Born: 18 August 1896; Noyon, France
- Died: 23 August 1970 (aged 74)
- Military career
- Allegiance: France
- Branch: Aviation
- Rank: Lieutenant
- Units: No. 82 Escadrille, No. 69 Escadrille
- Awards: Legion d'honneur Médaille militaire Croix de Guerre; Italian Croix de la Valeur

Lieutenant François Eugene Marie Antoine de Boigne was a French pilot during World War I, who became a flying ace during the war. He was credited with six aerial victories between May 3, 1917 through October 9, 1918 as part of Escadrille 82 and Escadrille 69.

== Biography ==
François Eugene Marie Antoine de Boigne was born in Noyon, France on 18 August 1896. On 11 November 1914, he volunteered for four years military service and became a Hussar. He was sent to pilot training on 13 June 1916. He was awarded his Military Pilot's Brevet on 25 August 1916. He was posted to Escadrille 82 on 2 January 1917. He would score his first victory while flying with them, on 3 May 1917. During the first half of 1918, he scored four more. On 16 September 1918, he would be transferred to Escadrille 69, with whom he would score his final victory. By war's end, he had risen through the enlisted ranks to be commissioned as a lieutenant.

Postwar, De Boigne served in China. He also served during World War II. He died on 23 August 1970.
