= Escadrille Spa.102 =

- Active: 1913–1918
- Country: France
- Branch: French Air Service
- Type: Fighter Squadron

Escadrille Spa.102 (earlier unit designations being Escadrille BR.17, Escadrille VB.2, Escadrille VB102, Escadrille N.102) was a French fighter squadron founded in 1913. It served throughout the First World War in a variety of aircraft types, claiming 85 aerial victories, of which 18 were approved.

== History ==
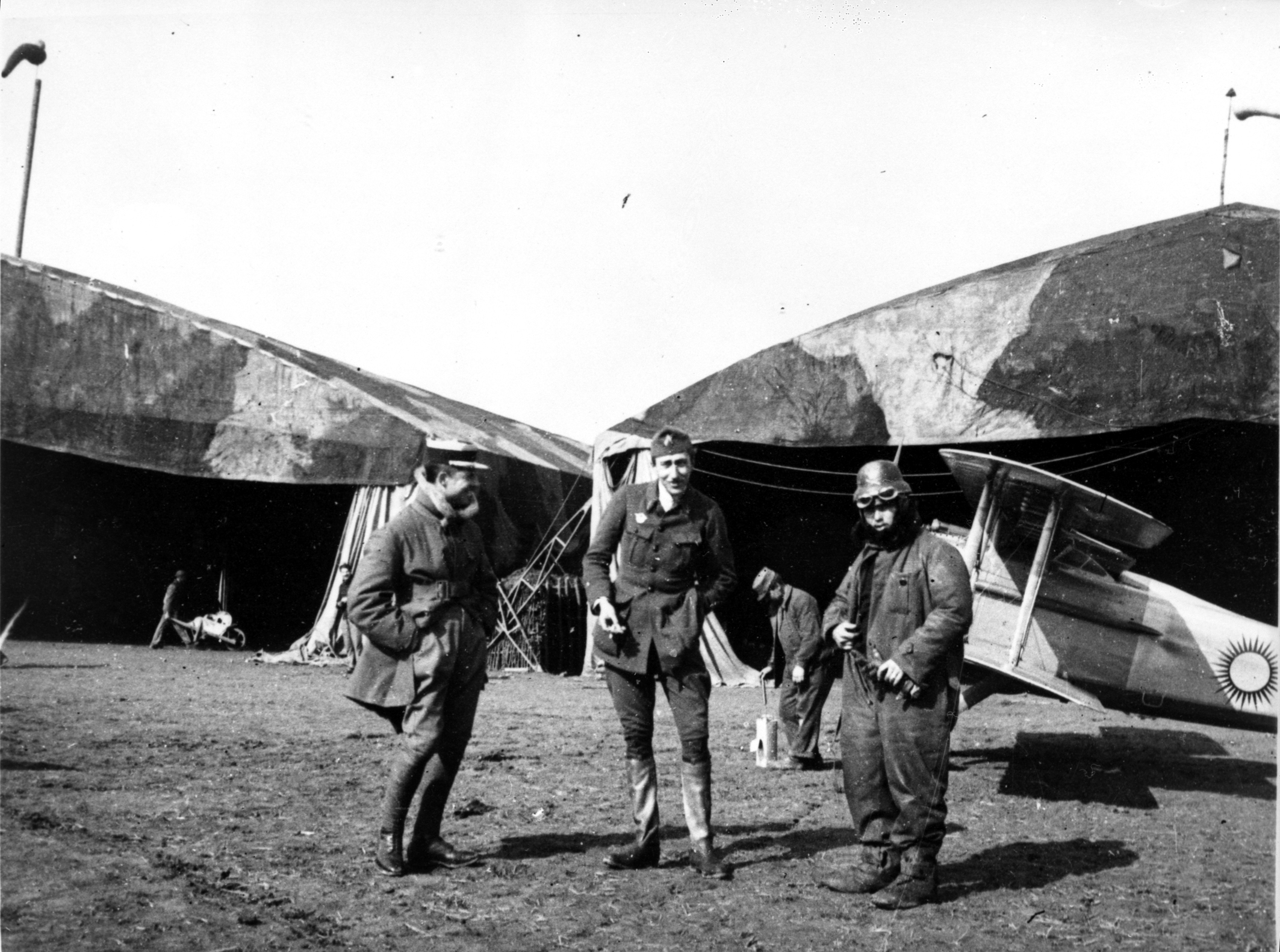
Members of Escadrille Spa.102 on the flight line with a SPAD fighter.

Escadrille Spa.102 was Escadrille BR.17 when it was founded in 1913 because it was fitted with Bréguets. On 18 October 1914, it became Escadrille VB.2 when it was resupplied with Voisins; in November, it was redesignated Escadrille VB102. The unit's operations during the early months of World War I are unknown except for a mention of St. Cyr. However, on 17 June 1916, while it was stationed at Malzeville, it re-equipped with Nieuports, changing its name to Escadrille N.102.

On 22 July 1916, the squadron moved to the II Armee sector. On 17 January 1917 it was shifted to the vicinity of the Marne River. In early April, it moved to the IV Armee sector. It accompanied IV Armee to Flanders on 1 July, staying until 15 December. Escadrille N.102 ended 1917 and began 1918 by moving to the 1er Armee on 14 January.

On 1 April 1918, the squadron refitted with SPAD fighters, and gained its final name of Escadrille Spa.102. It would use its new fighters to aid VI Armee until 23 September. Two days later, it returned to 1er Armee, where it remained until war's end.

During the war, Escadrille Spa.102 claimed 85 aerial victories, although only 18 of these were ever verified.

== Commanding officers ==
- Capitaine de Laborde: November 1914
- Capitaine Armand des Prez de la Morlais: 27 March 1915
- Chef de Bataillon Pouderoux: Early 1916
- Lieutenant Jean Derode: 16 January 1917 - 24 March 1918
- Capitaine Roger Lemercier de Maisoncelle-Vertille de Richemont: 24 March 1918 - 25 September 1918
- Capitaine Andre d'Humeries: 25 September 1918 - 11 November 1918

== Aircraft ==
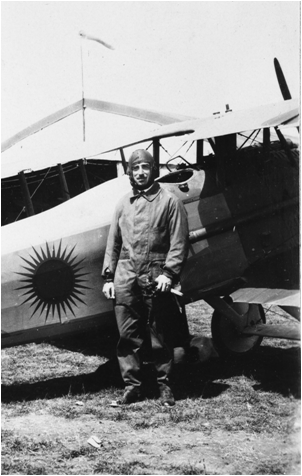
SPAD S.13 fighter of Escadrille Spa.102. Pilot unidentified.

- Breguets: 1913
- Voisins: 18 October 1914 - November 1914
- Nieuports: 18 June 1916 - 1 April 1918
- SPADs: 1 April 1918 - 11 November 1918
