= Georges Raymond =

French flying ace

- Born: 19 June 1897; Lyon, France
- Died: 4 October 1918 (aged 21)
- Military career
- Allegiance: France
- Branch: Flying service
- Rank: Capitaine
- Unit: Escadrille 3
- Commands: Escadrille 3
- Awards: Legion d'Honneur; Croix de Guerre

Capitaine Georges Raymond was a French World War I flying ace credited with five aerial victories.

== Biography ==
Georges Raymond was born in Lyon, France, on 19 June 1887.

Originally a cavalryman, Raymond trained as a pilot and was posted to Escadrille 3 in May 1916. Raymond scored his first four victories flying a Spad VII, then switched to a Spad XIII for his fifth. He scored his first win on 25 September 1916, his last on 26 February 1918, and had two unconfirmed claims along the way. On 2 November 1917, he rose to command the squadron in the wake of the dual loss of Georges Guynemer and Alfred Heurteaux. He was promoted to capitaine in May, 1918. He surrendered command of Escadrille 3 on 3 September 1918 because he was incapacitated with pneumonia. He died in the hospital at Chalons-sur-Marne from crash injuries and pneumonia on 4 October 1918.
