= Heurtaux =

Heurtaux is a French surname. Notable people with the surname include:

- Alfred Heurtaux (1893–1985), French flying ace
- Thomas Heurtaux (born 1988), French footballer
