= Ortoli =

Ortoli is a surname. Notable people with the surname include:

- François-Xavier Ortoli (1925–2007), French politician and 5th President of the European Commission
  - Ortoli Commission, the European Commission that held office from 6 January 1973 to 5 January 1977
- Jacques Ortoli (1895–1947), French flying ace and Corsican patriot
- Julien d'Ortoli (born 1983), French sailor
