= Groupe de Combat 12 =

Groupe de Combat 12 (GC 12) 'Les Cigognes' ('The Storks') was the most celebrated and successful French Air Service Groupe de Chasse during the World War I. Its roster included Georges Guynemer, René Dorme, Alfred Heurteaux, René Fonck, Raoul Echard, Joseph-Henri Guiguet, Roland Garros, Mathieu Tenant de la Tour, and the Serb Tadija Sondermajer, among other World War I aces. The fliers from CG 12 carried different stork insignia on their planes.

== History ==
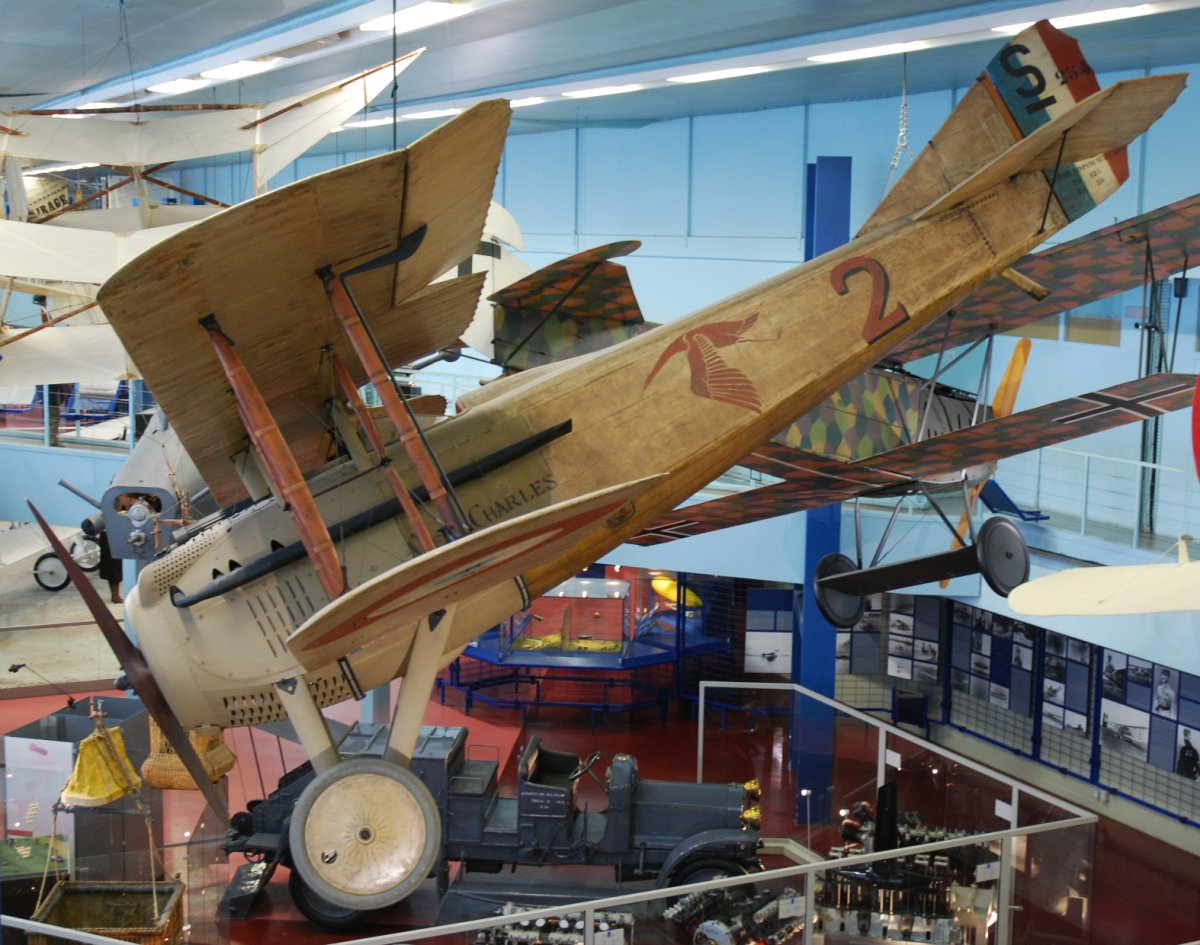
Georges Guynemer's original SPAD S.VII, nicknamed "Vieux Charles", preserved at Musée de l'Air et de l'Espace

It originated as an ad hoc group, Groupement de Combat de la Somme. Four escadrilles were consolidated in this group—Escadrilles N3, N26, N73, and N103. Founded on 16 April 1916 to fight in the Second Battle of the Aisne, the makeshift group also had three other escadrilles temporarily assigned—N37, N62, and N65. The group was placed under command of Capitaine Felix Brocard; he was promoted from command of Escadrille 3N. On 1 November 1916, it was formalized as Groupe de Combat 12; its original table of organization contained the four permanent escadrilles.

On 28 January 1917, the unit was posted to the X Armee. It transferred to the VII Armee in March. On 12 July, it moved to support Ier Armee in Flanders. GC 12 was transferred to VI Armee again on 11 December 1917. On 18 January 1918, Escadrille 67 replaced Escadrille 73 within the groupe. The groupe made the transition to support X Armee on 5 June 1918; to V Armee on 17 July; to Ier Armee on 29 July; and to IV Armee on 18 September 1918.

== Commanding officers ==
- Capitaine Felix Brocard: 1 November 1916 – early 1918
- Capitaine Horment: early 1918 – 4 May 1918
- Capitaine Charles Dupuy: 4 May 1918 – end of war

== Assignments ==
- X Armee: 28 January 1917
- VIII Armee: March 1917
- Ier Armee: 12 July 1917
- VI Armee: 11 December 1917
- X Armee: 5 June 1918
- V Armee: 17 July 1918
- Ier Armee: 29 July 1918
- IV Armee: 18 September 1918
