= Auguste Baux =

French WWI flying ace

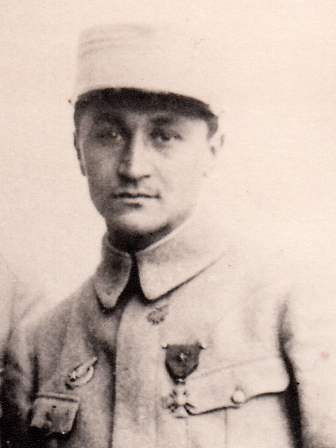
- Born: 9 July 1892; Bourg-de-Péage, Drôme, France
- Died: 17 July 1918 (aged 26); Cuchery, Marne, France
- Military career
- Allegiance: France
- Branch: French Army
- Service years: 1914–1918
- Rank: Adjutant
- Unit: Escadrille 103
- Awards: Médaille militaire Croix de Guerre

Adjutant Auguste Baux (9 July 1892 – 17 July 1918) was a French World War I flying ace credited with five aerial victories.

== Biography ==
Baux first served in the infantry, and on 3 October 1914 during the fighting on the Western Front was taken prisoner by the Germans. However he managed to escape and returned to the French lines.

He later transferred to the Army's aviation service, gaining Military Pilot's Certificate No. 5484, and was then posted to Escadrille N 103 on 4 May 1917, flying Nieuports. The unit was renamed Escadrille SPA 103 in April 1917, after re-equipping with SPAD aircraft.

Baux's first confirmed aerial victory came on 16 March 1918 after shooting down an Albatros D.V fighter over Witry-lès-Reims. On 22 March he and two other pilots were jointly credited with shooting down a Rumpler two-seater reconnaissance aircraft over Rilly-la-Montagne. On 22 April Baux and Sgt Gilbert Loup claimed two fighters shot down over Laval, but their claims were denied. On 2 June his victory over an enemy aircraft over Moreuil was confirmed, and he gained two more confirmed victories (though details remain obscure) before his death in combat over Cuchery on 17 July 1918.

Baux was awarded the Military Medal and the Croix de Guerre with four palms.

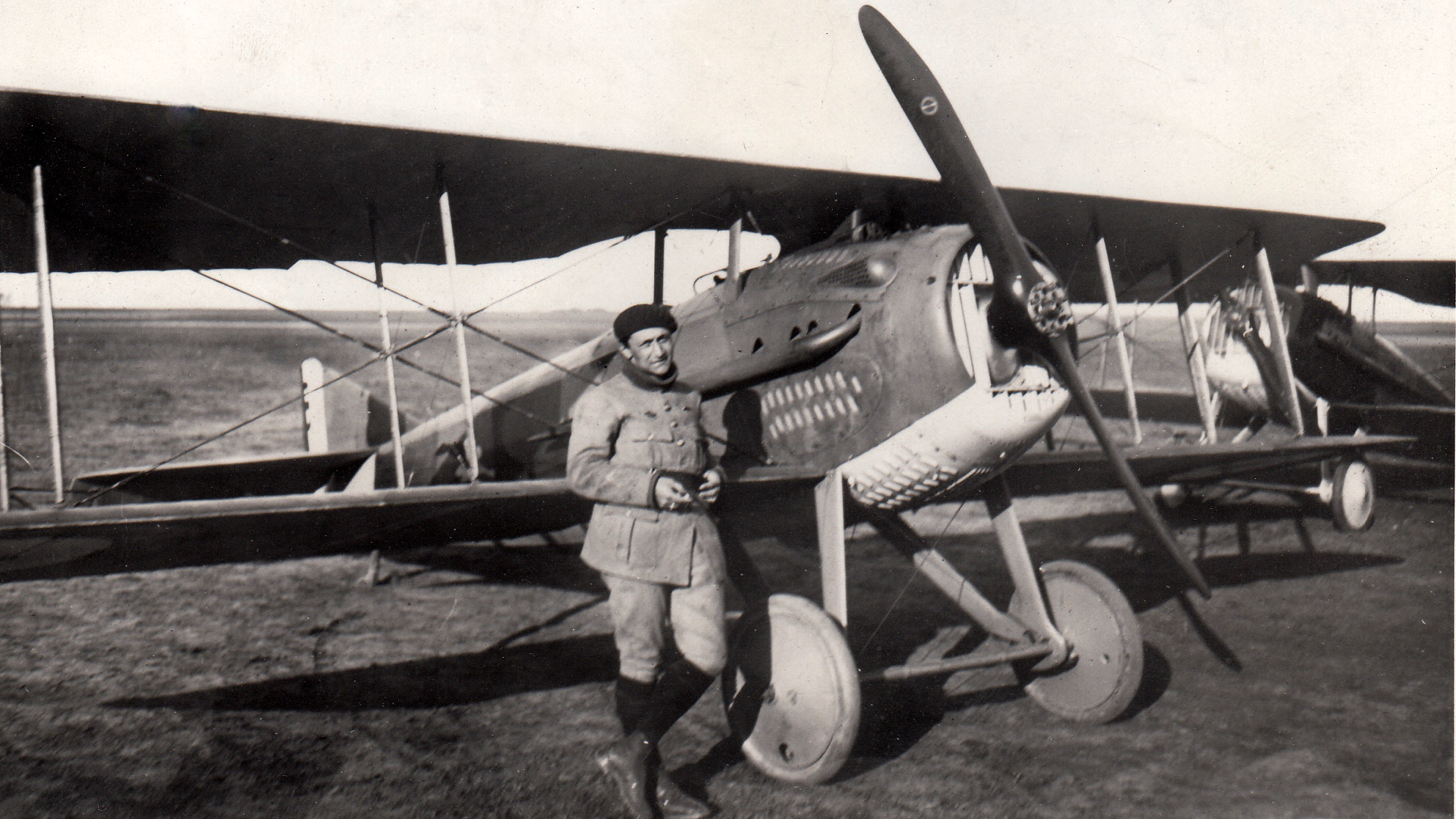
Auguste Baux stands next to his SPAD.

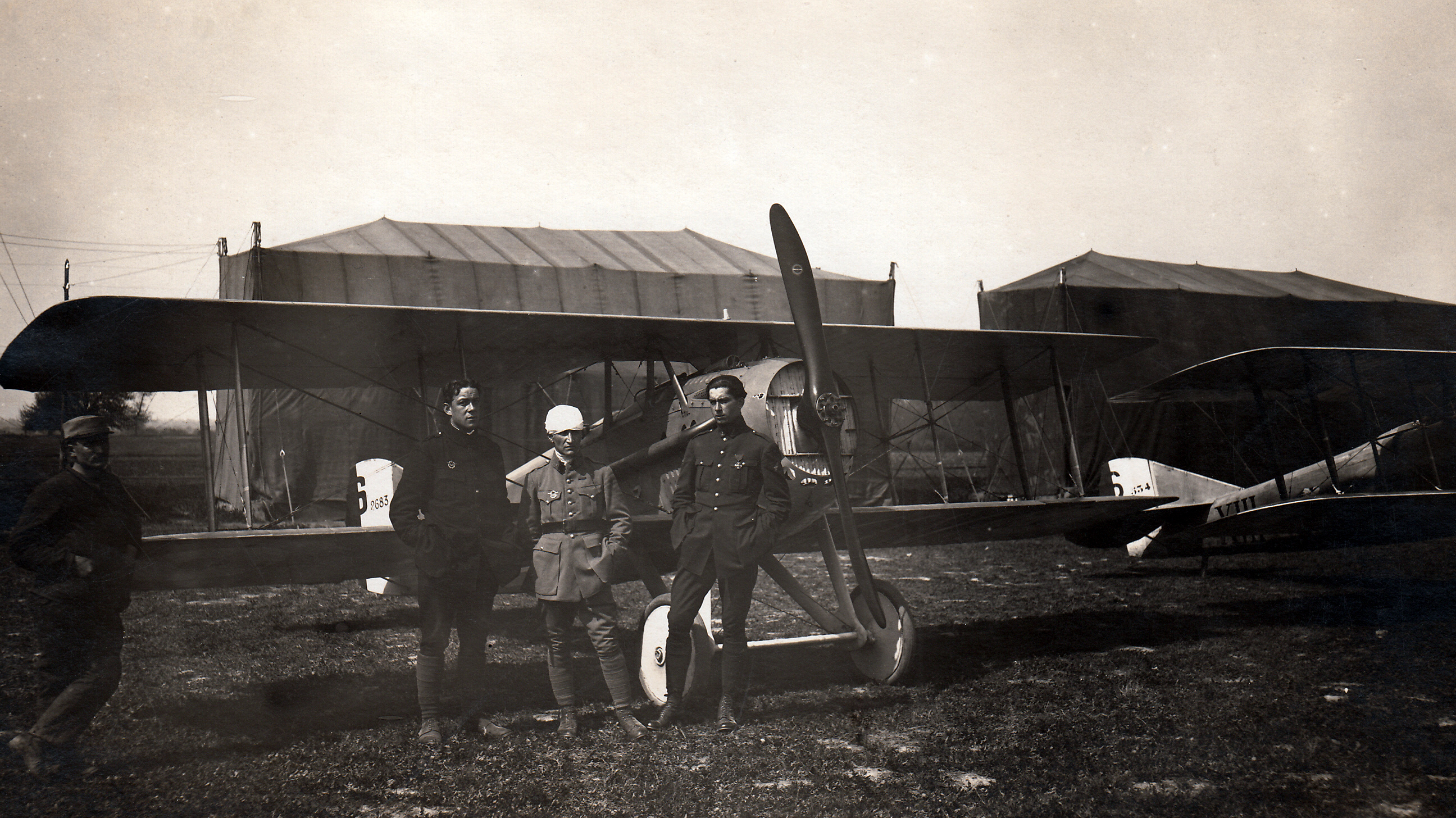
Auguste Baux stands next to his SPAD, with his squadronmates.
