= Albert Auger =

French flying ace

Albert Victor Robert Auger
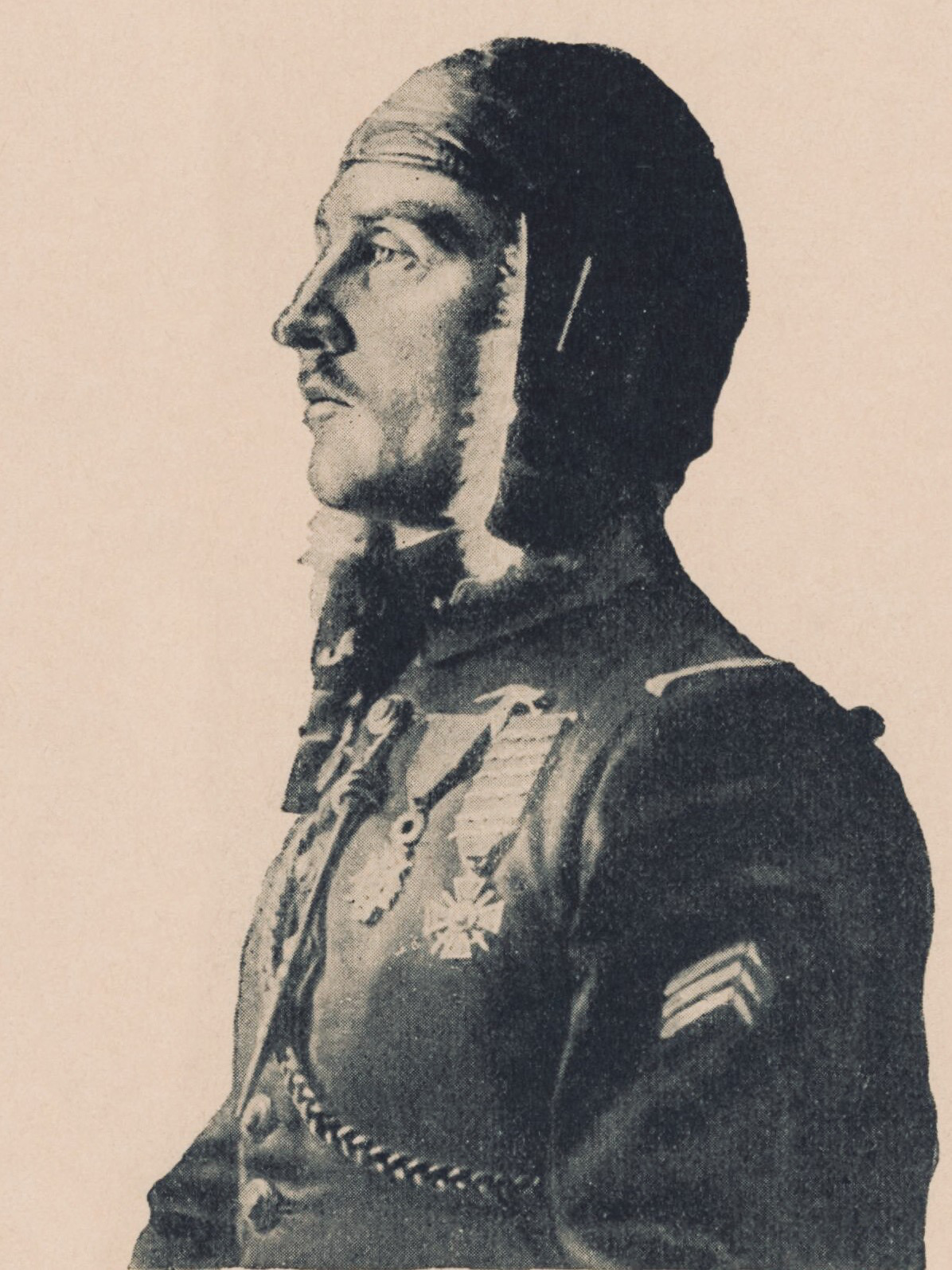
- Born: 26 January 1889; Constantine, Algeria
- Died: 28 July 1917 (aged 28); Dunkirk, France
- Burial place: Passy Cemetery, Paris
- Military career
- Allegiance: France
- Branch: French Army
- Service years: 1914–1917
- Rank: Captain
- Units: 11ème régiment d'infanterie 31ème régiment d'infanterie Escadrille 11
- Commands: Escadrille 31; Escadrille 3
- Conflicts: World War I
- Awards: Legion d'Honneur; Croix de Guerre

Capitaine Albert Victor Robert Auger (26 January 1889 – 28 July 1917) was a French World War I flying ace credited with seven confirmed aerial victories, and a further 14 unconfirmed.

== Military service ==
Auger volunteered to join the 11ème régiment d'infanterie on 24 October 1907 as a reservist, and on the outbreak of World War I he was mobilized into the 31ème régiment d'infanterie. He was wounded in action on 31 August 1914, and was made a Chevalier of the Légion d'honneur on 8 November. He transferred to flying service on 25 January 1915, receiving military pilot's certificate No. 928 at the military flying school at Pau on 11 May 1915. He was posted to Escadrille 11 on 11 May 1915, only to be wounded again on 8 July. On 22 September 1915, he took command of Escadrille 31, and was promoted to capitaine on 26 December 1915. He scored twice in this assignment, on 13 March and 2 April 1916. Auger was seriously injured in a crash on 16 April. He recovered, and flew with Escadrille 3 to score again on 9 February 1917. A week later, he was wounded yet again, in a dogfight with four Germans. A month later, on 17 March 1917, Auger took command of Escadrille 3. He scored four more times, including a win shared with Joseph M. X. de Sévin, with his last being 28 June 1917. Auger then upgraded to a SPAD. On 28 July, he took his SPAD into a dogfight with five German aircraft, and was shot in the neck. Bleeding profusely, he somehow still managed to land behind friendly lines, but bled to death within a few minutes. Jasta 8 seems to have been his opponent. Its commanding officer, Gustav Stenzel, was killed in this fight, with no one claiming him. Rudolf Francke of Jasta 8 posted a claim that went unconfirmed, but was probably Auger.

He is buried in the Passy Cemetery in Paris.

== List of aerial victories ==
Sources
No.	Date	Aircraft	Opponent	Result	Location	Notes
1	13 March 1916	Nieuport	LVG C	Destroyed	Cumieres	
2	2 April 1916	Nieuport	Albatros D	Destroyed	Creux	
3	9 February 1917	Nieuport	Albatros	Destroyed	Rogeville	
4	22 April 1917	Nieuport	German two-seater	Destroyed	Lierval	
5	11 May 1917	Nieuport	German two-seater	Destroyed	Vailly	Victory shared with Joseph de Sevin
6	4 June 1917	Nieuport	Enemy aircraft	Destroyed	Grandelain	
7	28 June 1917	Nieuport	Balloon	Destroyed	West of Pontavert	
