= Mathieu Tenant de la Tour =

French WWI flying ace (1883–1917)

Mathieu Marie Joseph Antoine Tenant de la Tour
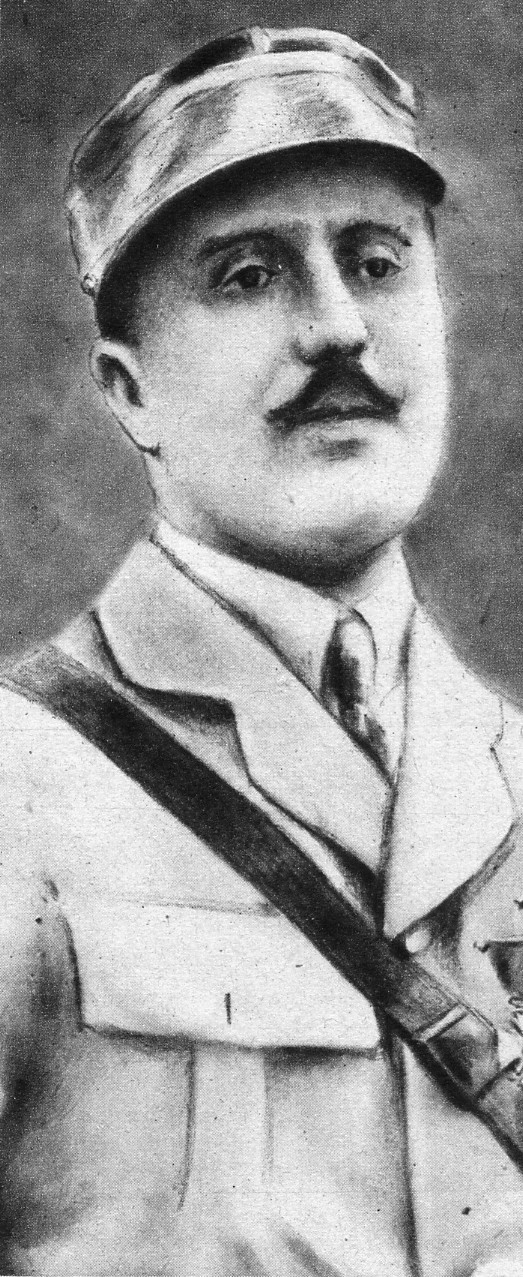
- French aviator Mathieu Tenant de la Tour in 1917
- Born: 5 December 1883; Paris, France
- Died: 17 December 1917 (aged 34); Auchel, France
- Burial place: Suippes 51 France
- Military career
- Allegiance: France
- Branch: Cavalry; aviation
- Rank: Capitaine
- Units: Escadrille 57; Escadrille 3
- Commands: Escadrille 26
- Awards: Legion d'honneur Croix de Guerre

Capitaine Mathieu Marie Joseph Antoine Tenant de la Tour (5 December 1883 - 17 December 1917) was a French World War I flying ace credited with nine aerial victories. He scored one of the first aerial victories over an observation balloon.

== Biography ==
=== Early life ===
He was born on 5 December 1883 in Paris.

=== Military service ===
Tenant de la Tour began his military service in the cavalry. He became an air force pilot on 6 May 1915 when he was awarded Military Pilot's Brevet No. 1919. He underwent advanced training, then survived an accident on 30 October 1915. On 29 December 1915, he was assigned to Escadrille 57. On 25 January 1916, flying in a literal fog of war, de la Tour helped down a German kite balloon, setting it afire. He pressed his attack down to an altitude of fifty meters in one of the first air-to-air wins over an observation balloon. The feat earned him the Legion d'honneur.

He was wounded in action on 25 April 1916. After he healed, he was assigned to Escadrille 3 to pilot a Nieuport fighter. During July, August, and September, he claimed another balloon and five enemy airplanes. On 27 December 1916, he had switched to a Spad VII for his eighth victory by downing Gustav Leffers.

In April 1917, after being promoted to Lieutenant, he was given command of Escadrille 26. He scored his last victory on 7 May 1917.

=== Death ===
He died in a flying accident with his new Spad XIII fighter at Auchel on 17 December 1917.

== Awards ==
Chevalier de la Légion d'Honneur
"Sous Lieutenant of Escadrille N57. On 25 January 1916, he was surprised by a sea of fog, out of which emerged a German balloon which he decided to attack. He approached it and duelled with the passenger in the basket, succeeding in silencing the enemy's gun. He continued to fire at the balloon until he was within fifty meters of the ground. Completely lost and with his motor acting up, he returned by dint of his coolness and strength, and landed behind the British lines." (Chevalier de la Légion d'Honneur citation, 1 February 1916)

Croix de guerre
