= François Portron =

- Born: June 13, 1890; Lusignan, France
- Died: January 21, 1973 (aged 82)
- Burial place: Lusignan, France
- Military career
- Allegiance: France
- Branch: Flying service
- Rank: Sous lieutenant
- Units: Escadrille C.39; Escadrille V.24; Escadrille Spa.31
- Awards: Legion d'honneur Croix de Guerre

Sous lieutenant François Portron was a French World War I flying ace credited with five aerial victories.

== Biography ==
See also Aerial victory standards of World War I

François Portron was born in Lusignan, France on 13 June 1890.

He was recalled from the military reserves as the First World War started, being posted to an artillery regiment on 3 August 1914. He was sent to aviation service on 10 October as a supply sergeant. On 21 January 1915, he was assigned to Escadrille V.24; on 20 February, he moved on to Escadrille C.39. He was subsequently selected for pilot's training. On 8 March 1916, he graduated with his Military Pilot's Brevet.

After further training, on 17 February 1917, he became a flight instructor. On 14 September, he was promoted from the enlisted ranks to Sous lieutenant. On 15 October 1917, he finally drew a combat assignment, with Escadrille N.31.

Beginning 22 May 1918 and ending 1 October 1918, François Portron scored five separate aerial victories, over a German reconnaissance plane, a scout, two Fokkers, and an observation balloon.

== Honors and awards ==
- Legion d'honneur
- Croix de Guerre with five palmes and two etoiles de vermeil.
