= Albert Louis Deullin =

French World War I flying ace

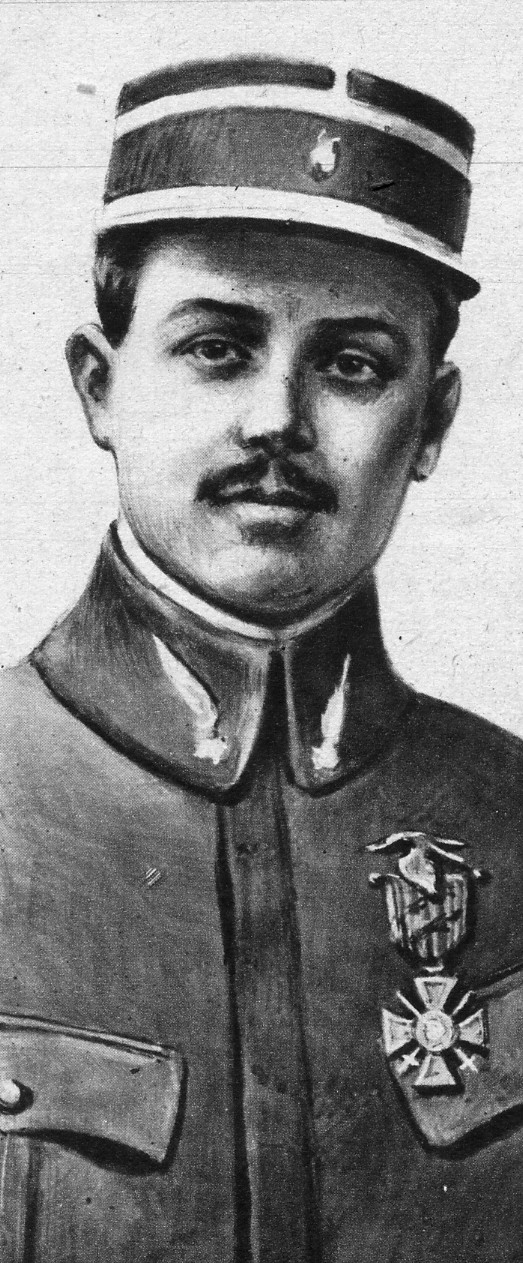
- Born: 24 August 1890; Épernay, France
- Died: 29 May 1923 (aged 32); Villacoublay, France
- Military career
- Allegiance: France
- Branch: Aviation
- Service years: ca. 1912—1923
- Rank: Capitaine
- Units: Escadrille 62, Escadrille 3
- Commands: Escadrille 73, Groupe de Combat 19
- Awards: Legion d'Honneur, Croix de Guerre

Capitaine Albert Louis Deullin (24 August 1890 – 29 May 1923) was a French World War I flying ace credited with twenty aerial victories. He served for the entirety of World War I. By war's end, he had risen to command of a fighter wing. He died in a postwar flying accident.

== Early life ==
Albert Louis Deullin was born on 24 August 1890 in Épernay, France. He joined the French military and was a non-commissioned officer on inactive status from the Dragoons by October 1912. The outbreak of World War I saw Deullin mobilized in his old unit. He was commissioned as a Sous lieutenant in December 1914.

== Aerial service ==
Deullin transferred to aviation duty in late April 1915. After pilot's training, he earned Pilot's Brevet No. 2708 on 14 June 1915. On 2 July 1915, he was assigned to fly two-seater Maurice Farman reconnaissance aircraft for Escadrille MF62. He scored his first aerial victory on 10 February 1916 while on a long reconnaissance flight behind German lines.

Soon he was switched to Escadrille N3 as a Nieuport fighter pilot. After downing two enemy aircraft in March 1916, Deullin was wounded in action on 2 April. He was sidelined for 15 days. After his return to action, he shot down his fifth enemy airplane on 30 April 1916.

By the time he scored his seventh victory on 15 September 1916, new SPAD VIIs were coming into the squadron's inventory. On 22 February 1917, with his victory count at 11, he was then transferred to command Escadrille 73 and began scoring for them. On 28 July 1917, he was again wounded in action; he remained in command despite the injury. Over the next fourteen months, he downed nine more enemy planes, with the last falling on 19 May 1918. He was promoted to higher command on 7 February 1918, to leadership of Group de Combat 19. It was while leading this wing that he shot down his 20th and last opponent over Montdidier on 19 May 1918. Eleven of his 20 victories had been scored while flying a Nieuport 17.

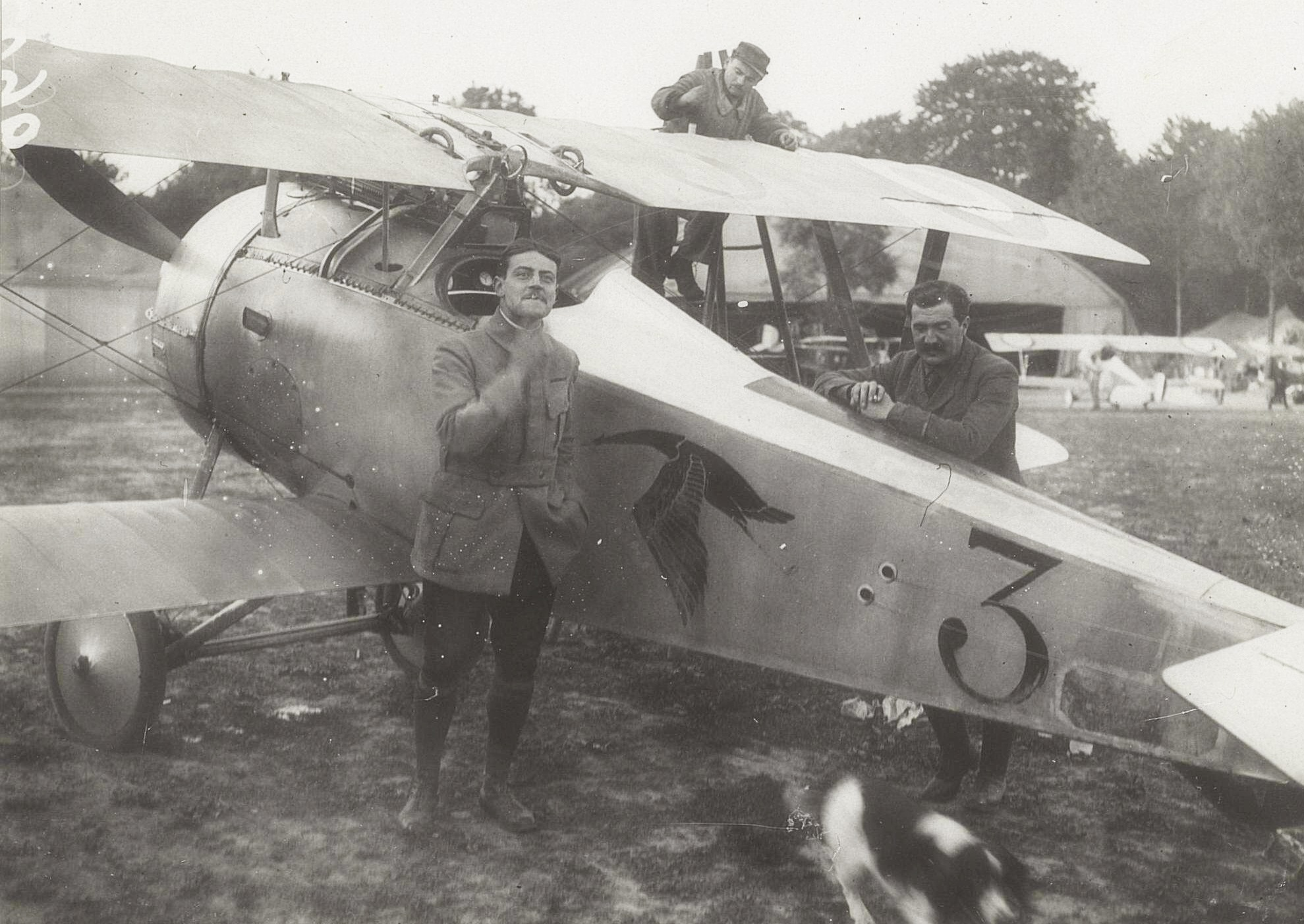
Nieuport 23 flown by Albert Deullin of Escadrille N3 (left) with squadronmate Paul Tarascon. 30 September 1916 at Cachy (cropped)

Five days later, Deullin, René Dorme, and another French pilot fought Jagdstaffel 9; Deullin barely fought free of four foes. Dorme did not return from the mission.

== Postwar career ==
After the war, Deullin served as chief pilot of CFRNA (Compagnie franco-roumaine de navigation aérienne; French-Romanian Company for Air Transport), employing many veterans pilots from former GC 19. Flying old Salmson 2A2 from military surplus, the company opened aerial lines from Paris to eastern European cities, including Istanbul. In 1923, the company flew on the early commercial airplanes such as the Caudron C.61.

Albert Deullin died in a flying accident at Villacoublay on 29 May 1923. He was testing a prototype of a new airplane.

== Honors and awards ==
Chevalier de la Légion d'Honneur
"Pilot with exceptional initiative and sang-froid, endlessly seeking battle against enemy planes. Wounded on 2 April 1916 during the course of aerial combat, he returned to his Escadrille before being completely rehabilitated, and since his return has had twelve auspicious combats. On 30 April 1916, he attacked point blank an enemy plane and downed it in front of our trenches. Already cited twice in army orders."(Chevalier de la Légion d'Honneur citation, 4 June 1916)

Officier de la Légion d'Honneur
"Commander of a Groupe de Combat, pursuit pilot, officer and model of french military aviation. Wounded three times in aerial combat. By his daily example and ceaseless work, in three months he has forged his Groupe de Combat into an elite unit. During the first days of the German offensive he executed in the rain and close to the ground, an audacious reconnaissance which was valuable to the intelligence officer. He downed his 20th enemy plane. Chevalier de la Légion d'Honneur for feats of war. Twelve citations." (Chevalier de la Légion d'Honneur citation, 4 June 1916)

Croix de guerre with 14 palmes

== Sources ==
Preceded by Maxime Lenoir	Top Flying Ace; France, World War I	Succeeded by André Julien Chainat
