= Jacques de Sieyes =

Legion of honor decorated captain

Jacques Edouard de Plan de Sieyes de Veynes
- Born: 21 July 1891; Nogent-sur-Marne, France
- Died: 25 June 1949 (aged 57); Paris, France
- Occupation: Captain

Jacques Edouard de Plan de Sieyes de Veynes (21 July 1891 — 25 June 1949) was a Legion of honor decorated captain who acted for de Gaulle against Vichy.

His parents were Raoul de Plan de Sieyès de Veynes (1848 - 1944), lawyer, Joan of Indy (1856 - 1943).

De Sieyes was a classmate of de Gaulle at the military academy École spéciale militaire de Saint-Cyr. In WWI he was "wounded three times and cited for bravery while serving in the French artillery and air force."

On 9 May 1917 he married Louise Hamilton-Paine (1893-1972) in Cap-d'Ail.

He was a flight captain and attaché of French Embassy in Washington, and president of Patou (perfume) from July 1940 before quitting, giving his time to help de Gaulle.

De Sieyes was a founding member of France Forever on 29 June 1940.

In September 1940, the Fighting French Committee of the Emergency Aid of Pennsylvania, was established "by Mrs. Eugene Houdry, Mrs. Pierre Quilleret, Mr. Jacques de Sieyès, then delegate of General de Gaulle and Dr. Albert Simard to support and encourage the thousands of young Frenchmen and women serving in England with the British forces."

In February 1941, as representative in the US of the Free French forces, de Sieyes left to meet de Gaulle. In London, he announced: "The French people are not only starving, but absolutely ready for revolt — if they had the means to carry it out."

After the war, de Gaulle appointed de Sieyes to an ambassadorial post.

De Sieyes died by drowning in June 1949.

== See also ==
- Escadrille 26
