= Joseph M. X. de Sévin =

Joseph Marie Xavier de Sévin
- Born: 10 March 1894; Toulouse, France
- Died: November 7, 1963 (aged 69)
- Military career
- Allegiance: France
- Branch: Infantry; aviation
- Rank: Major General
- Units: 14e Regiment d'Infanterie, Escadrille 12, Escadrille 26
- Awards: Légion d'honneur, Croix de Guerre with nine palmes, Mentioned in Dispatches seven times, Order of the British Empire
- Other work: Major General during World War II

Major General Joseph Marie Xavier de Sévin (10 March 1894 – 7 November 1963) began his military career as a World War I flying ace credited with twelve confirmed aerial victories, as well as thirteen unconfirmed ones. He rose to the rank of major general while serving until World War II.

== Early life ==
Joseph Marie Xavier de Sévin was born on 10 March 1894 in Toulouse, France. His education progressed to military schooling.

== World War I service ==
=== 1914 ===
De Sévin was in the special military school at St. Cyr in 1914. He volunteered for active military service on 2 September 1914. His first assignment was as an enlisted man in the 14e Regiment d'Infanterie. He then began a series of rapid promotions. On 5 November 1914, he was promoted to Corporal; on 30 November, to Sergeant; on 5 December, he was commissioned a temporary Sous lieutenant.

=== 1915 ===
On 15 July 1915, de Sévin reported to Pau for pilot's training. On 19 October 1915, he was awarded Pilot's Brevet No. 1804. On 11 November, he was assigned to Escadrille N12 to pilot both single-seat and two-seat Nieuports. He was confirmed in his commission on 27 December 1915.

=== 1916–1917 ===
He would not score his first aerial victory until 11 July 1916. His second was eight months later, when he shared a claim with Marcel Nogues on 4 March 1917. He was made a Chevalier de la Légion d'honneur on 19 April 1917. On 11 May, he teamed with Alfred Auger for a third win, over a two-seater. On 19 June, he shared a victory with Jacques Ortoli and Jean Chaput. By 30 September, his string was up to six, with five of the wins shared. On 25 December, he was given command of Escadrille Spa26, accompanied by a promotion to lieutenant.

=== 1918 ===
He tallied up another six wins between 20 January 1918 and 24 October 1918, including one shared with Andre Dubonnet. During this stretch, he was appointed temporary Captain on 2 March 1918, and confirmed in the rank on 28 June.

== Post World War I service ==
De Sévin continued in service after the war, becoming a professional soldier. At some point, de Sévin served in Morocco, at Istres; he also was the French Air Attaché in Bucharest.

De Sévin commanded a flying school during World War II, and was in North Africa in 1943. On 25 September 1944, Joseph Marie Xavier de Sévin capped off his professional career by being promoted to General de Division Aerienne and raised to Grand Officer de la Légion d'honneur.

Joseph Marie Xavier de Sévin died on 7 November 1963.

== Honors and awards ==
Chevalier de la Légion d'honneur

"Brilliant pilote de chasse having a high conception of devotion to duty. Always prepared for the most difficult missions. Wounded in the infantry at the beginning of the war, he transferred to aviation, downing his second enemy plane on 4 March 1917. Already cited three times in army orders." (Chevalier de la Légion d'honneur citation, 19 April 1917)

Awarded the Order of the British Empire during World War II.
