= Escadrille 103 =

WWI French Air Force unit (1914–18)

Escadrille VB – 103 – N 103 – SPA - 103
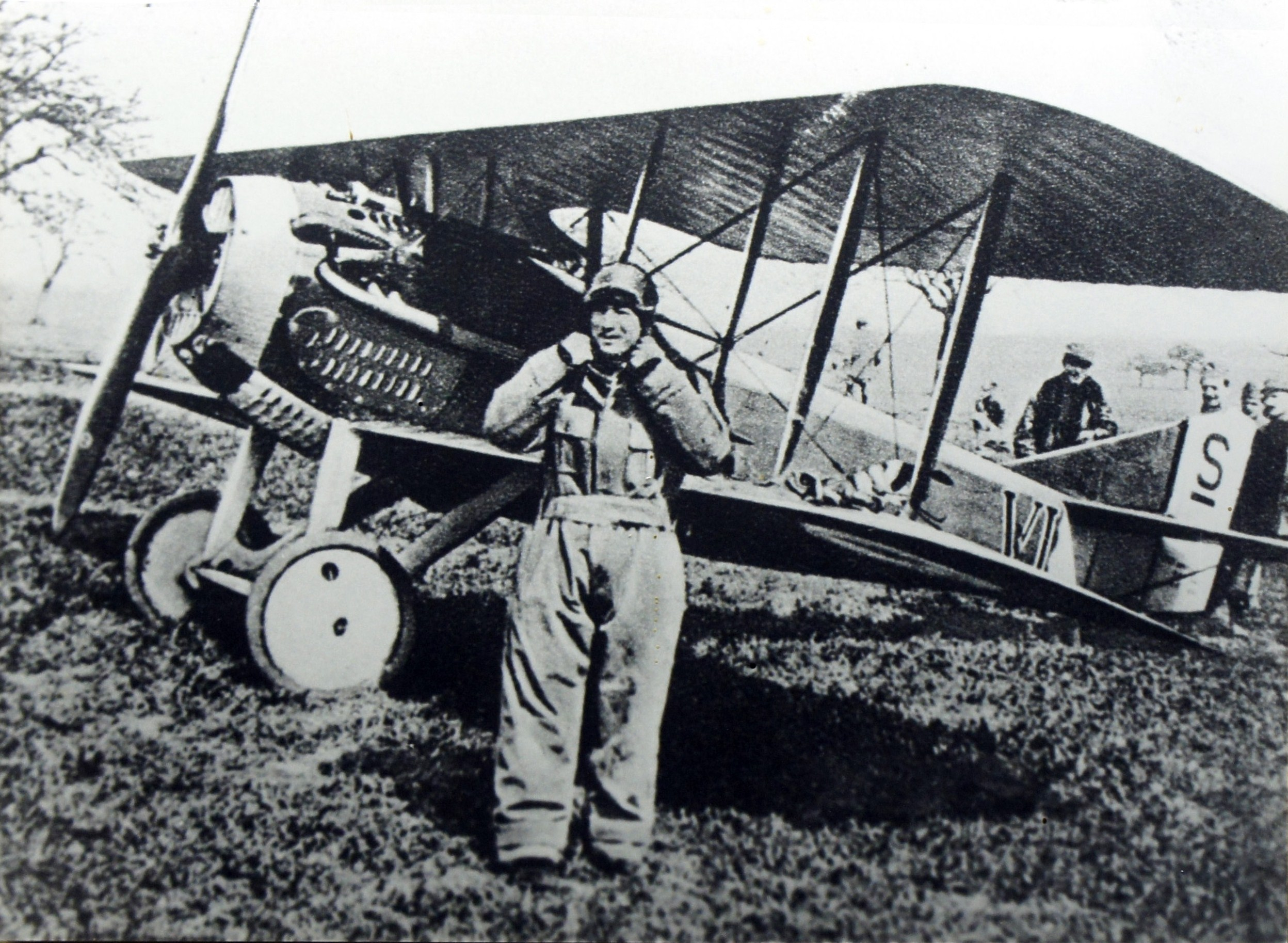
- Spad S.XIII of René Fonck with the flying stork unit emblem
- Active: 1914-1918
- Country: France
- Branch: French Air Service
- Type: Bomber/Pursuit Escadrille
- Engagements: World War I

Escadrille 103 of the French Air Force was an elite aviation unit on the Western Front during World War I. One of its many aces, René Fonck was the highest scoring Allied fighter-pilot.

== History ==
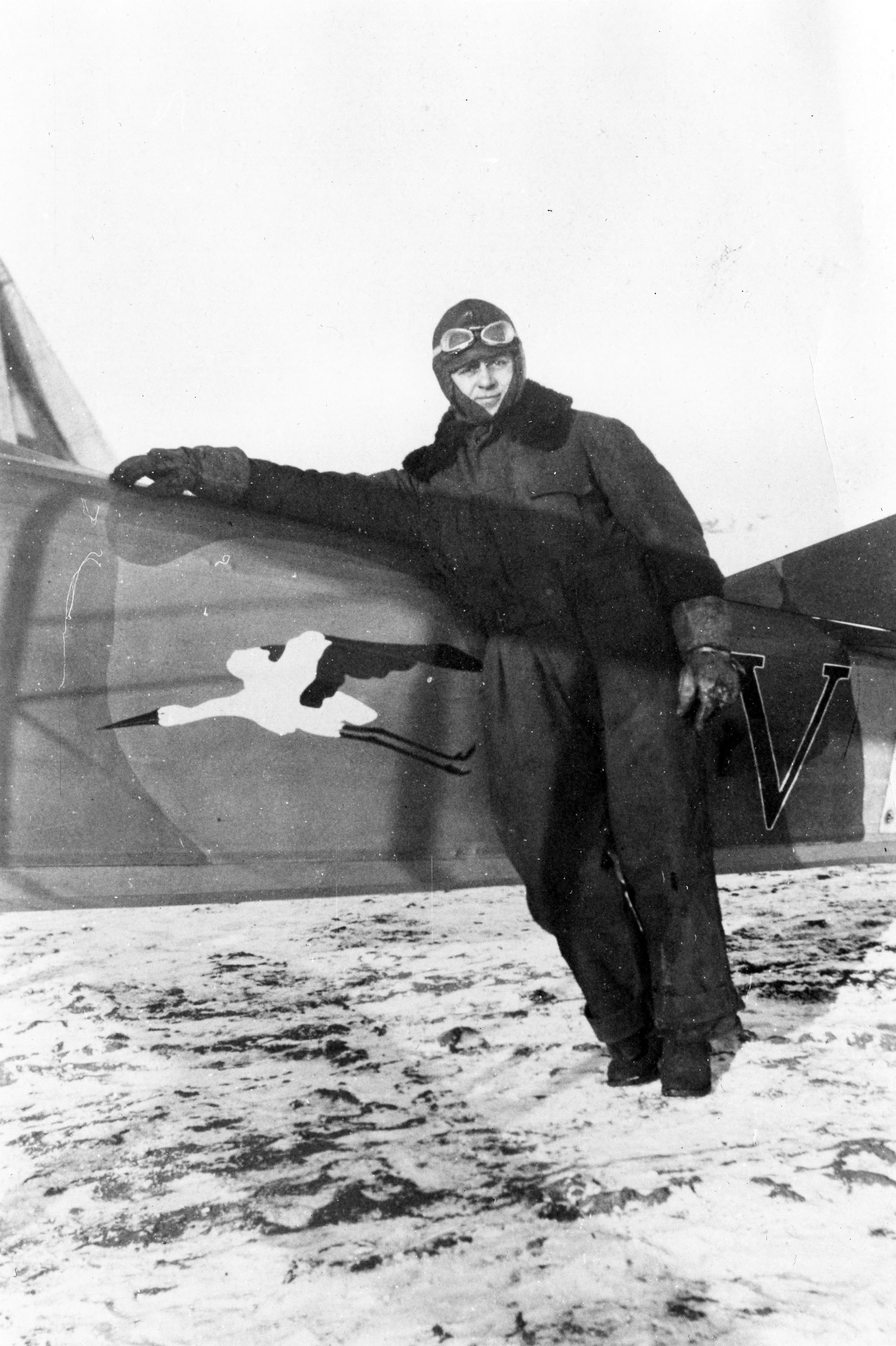
WWI era French Service Aéronautique American volunteer pilot Phelps Collins, January 1918

Escadrille 103 was formed from Breguet Escadrille 17, which was founded on 2 August 1914 at Longvic. On 16 November 1914, it re-equipped with Voisins, becoming Escadrille VB.3. On 23 November 1914, it was posted to Groupe de Bombardment No. 1, commanded by Commandant Louis de Goys de Mezeyrac. On 4 March 1915, it was redesignated Escadrille VB.103. As part of GB.1, the escadrille was cited for its valor on 27 May 1915. General Ferdinand Foch issued the citation on 1 June. Foch would issue a second citation on 19 September 1915, based on the bombing raids of the 13th on Ludwigshafen.

On 19 February 1916, the escadrille was converted to an escadrille de chasse (fighter squadron). It was issued Nieuports and renumbered as Escadrille N.103. On 16 April 1916, the unit was amalgamated into Groupement de Combat de la Somme, along with Escadrilles N.26, N.73, and N.3. Escadrilles N.37, N.62, and N.65 were also temporarily assigned to the groupement. All seven units were placed under command of Brocard. On 1 November 1916, the original four squadrons, including Escadrille N.103, were consolidated as Groupe de Combat 12 (GC 12), under the continuing command of Brocard. The SPADs in GC 12 bore insignia of storks in different phases of flight and were known as "Les Cignones."

On 28 January 1917, the unit was posted to the Xe Armée. It transferred to the VIIe Armée in March. On 12 July, it moved to support Ier Armée in Flanders. GC 12, including Escadrille 103, was transferred to VIe Armée again on 11 December 1917.

Escadrille 103 continued its service within GC 12, as the group made transitions to support Xe Armée on 5 June 1918; Ve Armée on 17 July; to Ier Armée on 29 July; and to IIe Armée on 9 September 1918. It received its third citation on the 9th, though the first as fighter unit Escadrille Spa.103. It was credited with destroying 85 enemy aircraft and disabling 69 others. Its final tally for the entire war was 108 enemy aircraft and three observation balloons destroyed. The heritage of the escadrille continues in the present day French air force; it is represented by the top bird on the Escadrille de Chasse 1/2 squadron emblem.

== Commanding officers ==
- Escadrille VB.3
  - Capitaine Georges Benoist: 2 August 1914
- Groupe de Bombardemente No. 1
  - Chef de Bataillon Louis de Gous de Mezeyrac: 23 November 1914 - POW 27 May 1915
  - Capitaine Willermoz: 28 May 1915 - 15 June 1915
  - Lieutenant de Vaisseau Cayla: 15 June 1915 - 30 June 1915
  - Capitaine Max Boucher: 1 July 1915 - 22 October 1915
  - Lieutenant de Monju: 23 October 1915 - early February 1916
- Escadrille N103
  - Capitaine Gallet: early February 1916 - 12 July 1916
  - Lieutenant Barbey: mid July 1916
  - Capitaine Jean d'Harcourt: late July 1916 - 27 March 1918
  - Lieutenant Joseph Batlle: 27 March 1918 - end of war

== Notable personnel ==
- René Fonck
- Auguste Baux

== Aircraft ==
- Breguet Type IV U1 & U2: August 1914
- Voisin III and Voisin V: November 1914
- Nieuport 11 and Nieuport 17: 1916
- SPAD VII and SPAD XIII: 1917

== See also ==
- Groupe de Combat 12
