= Escadrille SPA.31 =

Escadrille MS 31 – N 31 – SPA 31
- Squadron insignia
- Active: 1914
- Country: France
- Branch: French Air Service
- Type: Fighter Squadron
- Engagements: World War I

Escadrille 31 of the French Air Force was founded at the beginning of the World War I, on 24 September 1914, at Dijon Air Base. Once equipped with Morane-Saulnier Ns, it was posted to I Armee of the French Army.

== History ==
In February 1915, Escadrille MS 31 was moved to defense of Verdun. In April 1915, it returned to I Armee; on the 26th, it began re-equipping with Nieuport 10 two-seaters. (Note: The Nieuport 10 aircraft is also sometimes identified as Nieuport 18, due to 18m^{2} wing area) By January 1916, the Escadrille 31 had rearmed with ten single-seater Nieuport 11s. When the unit acquired Lieutenant de Villeneuve as commander in mid April, he instituted the use of a Roman archer as the escadrille insignia. In October, Escadrille N 31 shifted to support II Armee. The following month, the unit was incorporated into Groupe de Combat II. Escadrille 31 began receiving SPADs on 7 January 1917. However, it would not totally rearm with SPADs until 17 September, when it was renamed Escadrille SPA 31.

The escadrille would serve as part of GC through the remainder of the war. When the armistice came, it had been credited with 42 aircraft and four observation balloons destroyed, and have earned two citations from Army Corps.

== Commanding officers ==
- Capitaine Raymond Yence: 24 September 1914 – ca 4 January 1915
- Capitaine Guy-Leopold Hautschamps: 5 January 1915 – died in accident ca 11 May 1915
- Capitaine Louis Mathieu: 12 May 1915 – KIA 22 September 1915
- Lieutenant Alfred Auger: 23 September 1915 – 16 April 1916
- Lieutenant Lucien Couret de Villeneuve: 17 April 1916 – 16 July 1917
- Capitaine Charles Dupuy: 17 July 1917 -
- Lieutenant Paul Reverchon: 6 May 1918 – 29 September 1918
- Lieutenant Richard de Frescheville – 30 September 1918

== Notable personnel ==
- Lieutenant Jacques Ortoli
- Adjutant Georges Blanc
- Sous Lieutenant Jules Covin
- Sous Lieutenant François Portron

== Aircraft ==
- Morane-Saulnier N: 24 September 1914
- Nieuport 10 two-seaters: 26 April 1915
- Nieuport 11: early January 1916
- SPAD: First received 7 January 1917
