= Escadrille 3 =

French Air Force flying unit

Escadrille BL 3 – MS 3 – N 3 – SPA 3
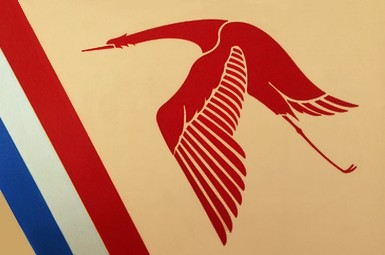
- Escadrille emblem – flying stork, down-stroke
- Active: 1912
- Branch: French Air Service
- Type: Pursuit Squadron
- Engagements: World War I

Escadrille 3 Les Cigognes ('The Storks') was a famous French aviation unit during World War I. It was often referred to as the 'Stork Escadrille N3' due to its insignia. Pilots from Groupe de Combat 12 adopted the name and placed images of storks in different phases of flying on their planes.

== History ==
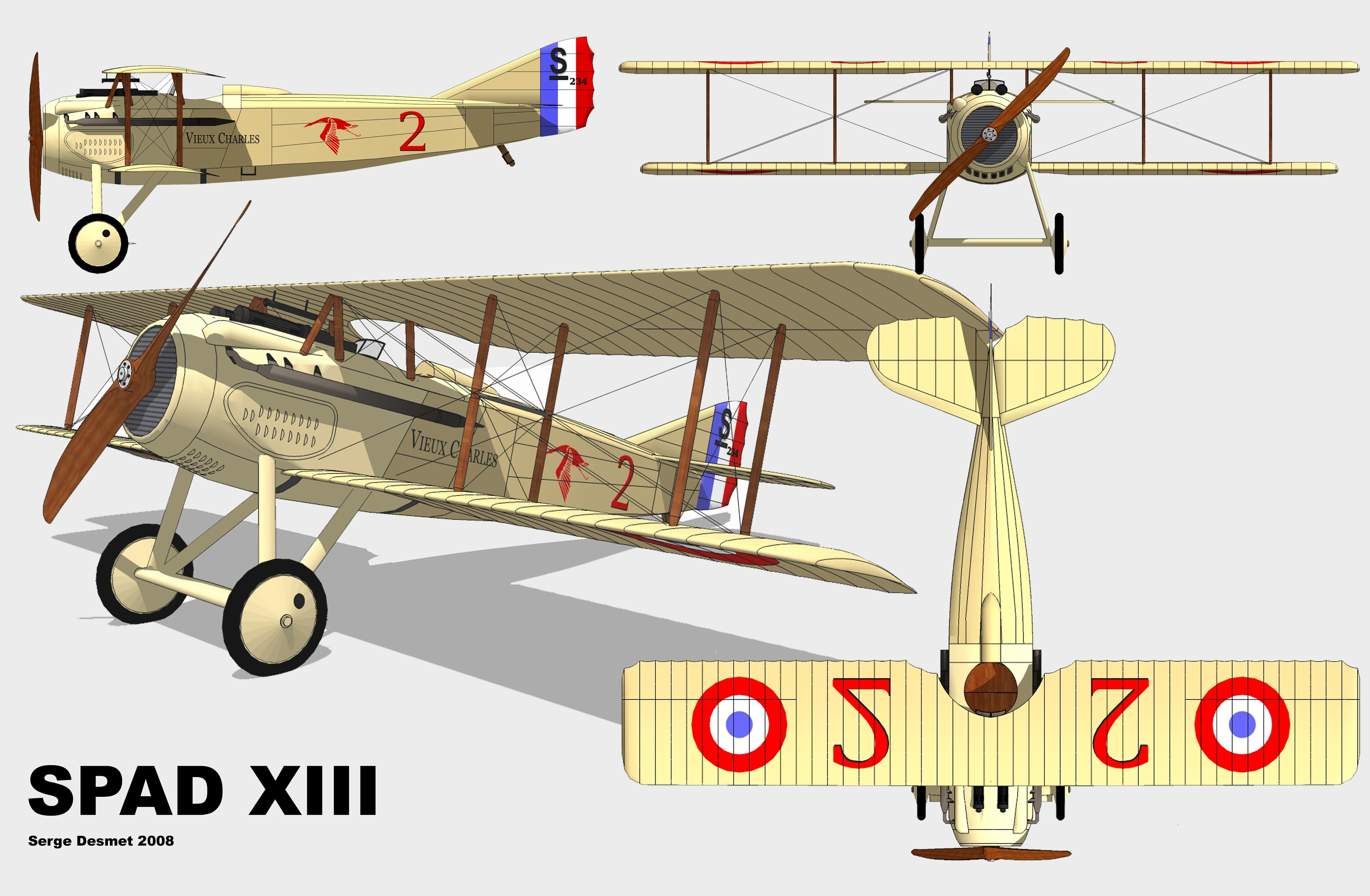
Spad XIII with down-stroke stork insignia

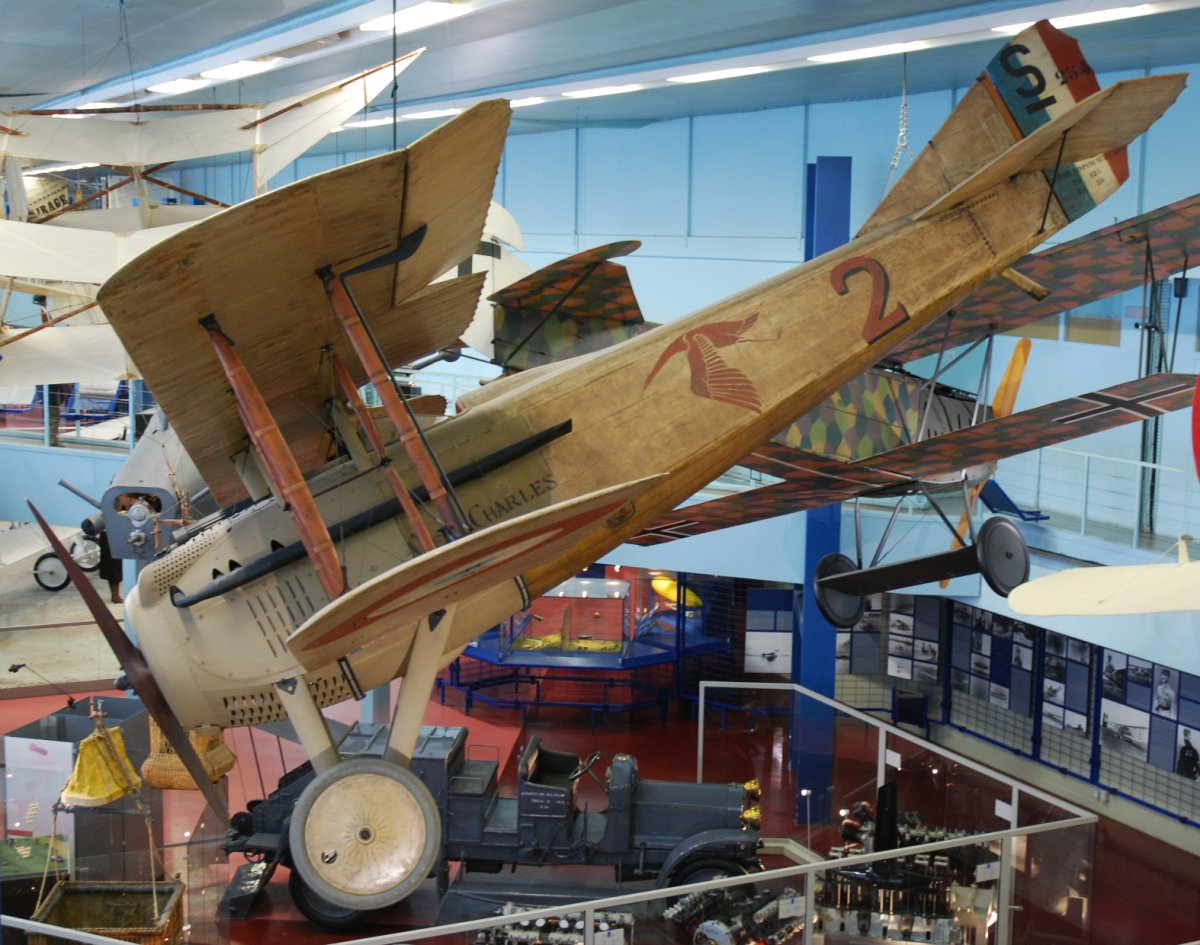
Georges Guynemer's original SPAD S.VII, nicknamed "Vieux Charles", preserved at Musée de l'Air et de l'Espace

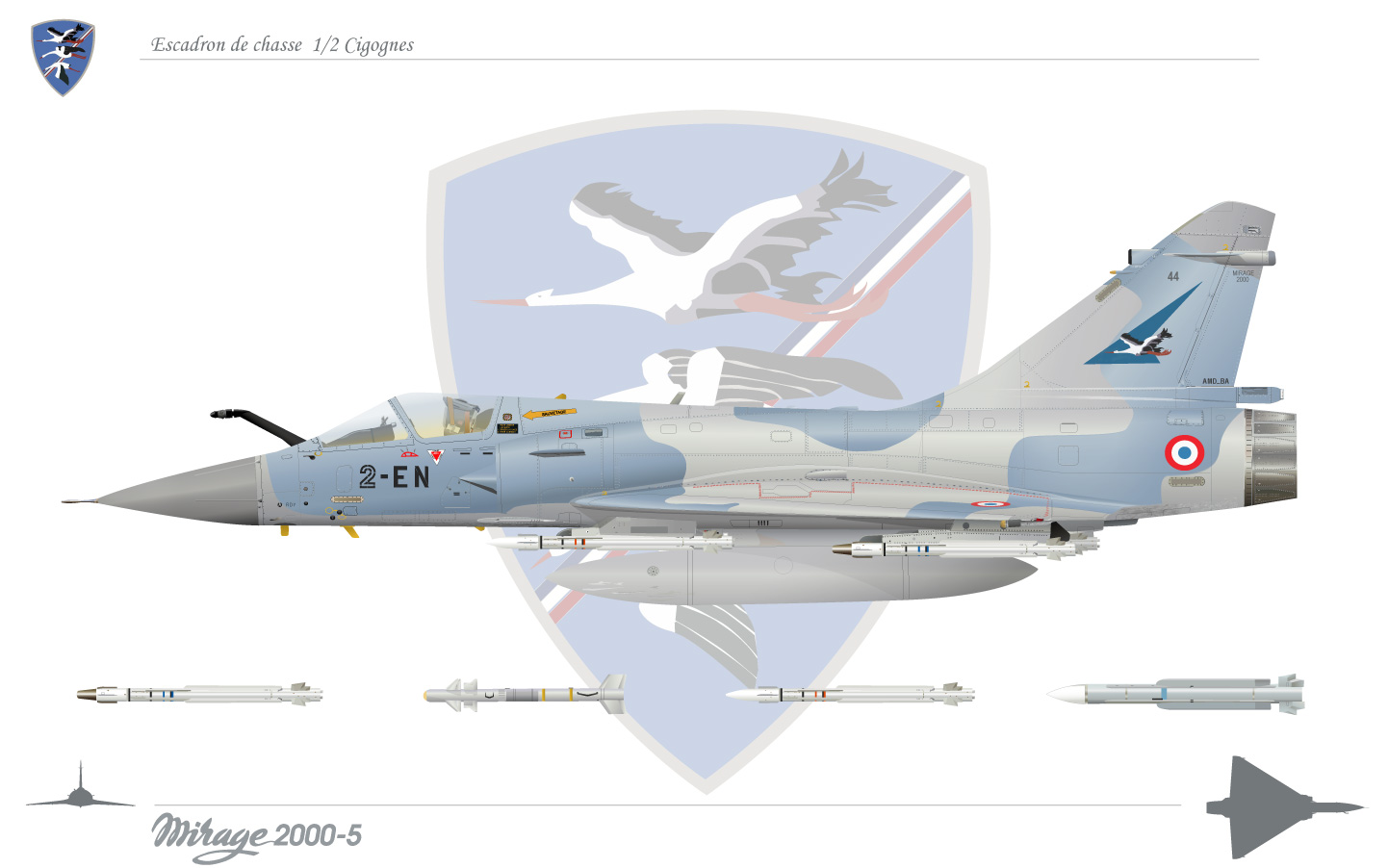
Mirage of the Groupe de Combat 12 (GC 12) 'Les Cigognes' ('The Storks')

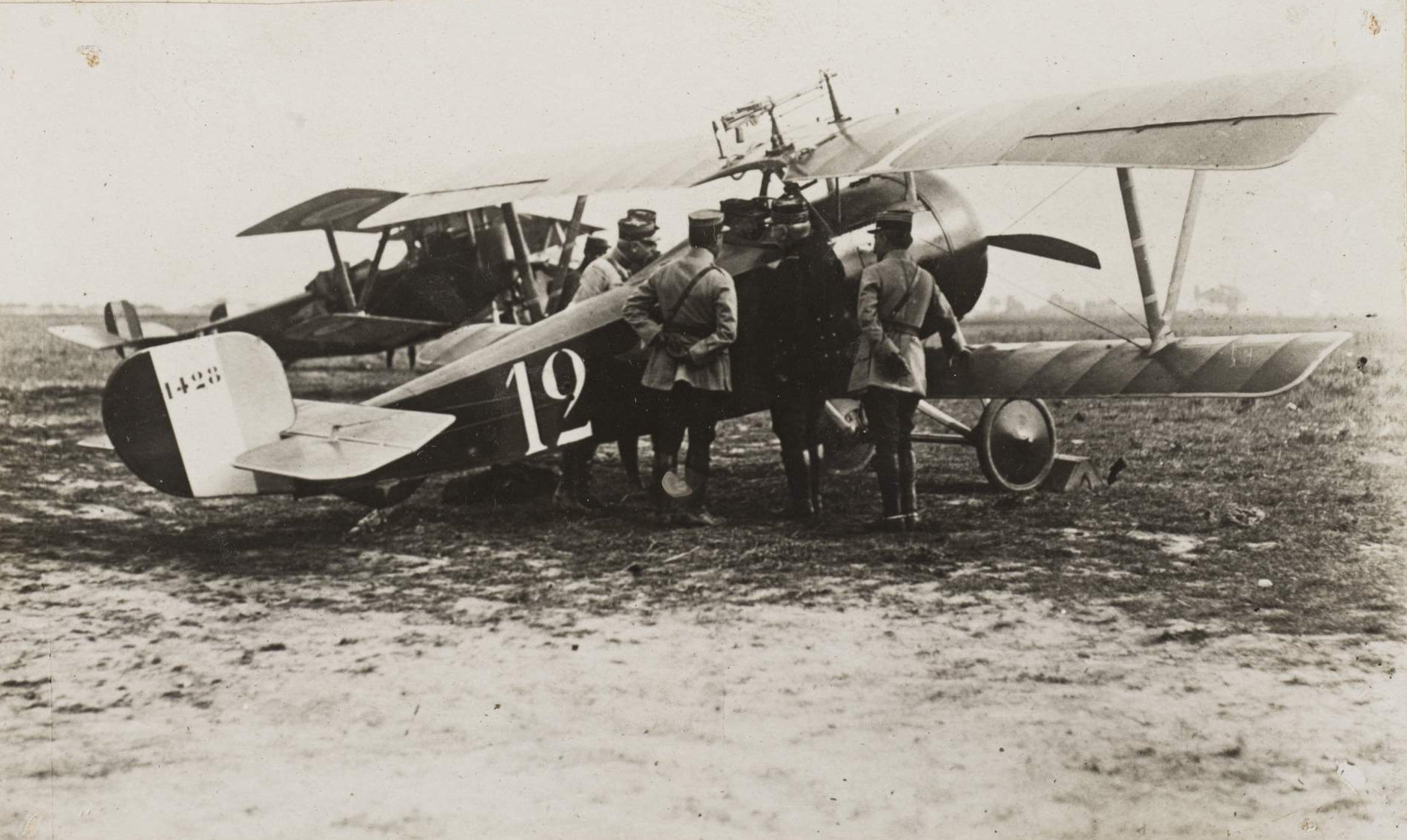
Joseph Joffre congratulates Rene Dorme.

Escadrille 3 was formed in July 1912 at Avord as Escadrille B13, equipped with Bleriots. It began World War I with the Bleriots; however, on 18 March 1915, it was re-equipped with Morane-Saulnier machines and redesignated Escadrille MS3. Capitaine Felix Brocard assumed command on 28 April 1915. By 20 September, it had once again re-equipped, this time with Nieuport scouts; its new designation was Escadrille N3.

On 16 April 1916, the unit had been amalgamated into Groupement de Combat de la Somme, along with Escadrille N26, Escadrille N73, and Escadrille N103. Escadrille N37, Escadrille N62, and Escadrille N65 were also temporarily assigned to the Groupement; the seven units were placed under command of Brocard. On 16 June 1916, Capitaine Alfred Heurtaux took command of Escadrille N3. In September 1916, the Commanding General of the VI Armee commended the unit for having downed 38 enemy aircraft and three observation balloons between 18 March and 18 August 1916.

On 1 November 1916, the temporary Groupement of the four original units was formalized as Groupe de Combat 12; it became more commonly known as les Cigognes (the storks). Once again, Escadrille N3 was cited, this time by Marshal Ferdinand Foch, for scoring victories over 36 enemy aircraft between 19 August and 19 November 1916. The following March, it would be again cited, this time for downing 128 enemy machines. The escadrille subsequently re-equipped with SPADs, becoming Escadrille Spa3.

On 5 December 1918, Escadrille Spa3 was cited for the fourth time. This time it was credited with the destruction of 175 enemy aircraft, and the disabling of an additional 100. This fourth citation also entitled the escadrille to the fourragere of the Médaille militaire, and of the Croix de Guerre. The heritage of the escadrille continues in the present day French air force; it is represented by the bottom bird on the EC 1/2 Squadron emblem.

== Commanding officers ==
- Lieutenant G. L. A. Bellemois: until 27 April 1915
- Capitaine Felix Brocard: 28 April 1915 – 15 June 1916
- Capitaine Alfred Heurteaux: 16 June 1916 – March 1917
- Capitaine Alfred Auger: March 1917 – KIA 28 June 1917
- Capitaine Georges Guynemer: 29 June 1917 – 5 August 1917
- Capitaine Alfred Heurteaux: 6 August 1917 – WIA 3 September 1917
- Capitaine Georges Guynemer: 4 September 1917 – KIA 12 September 1917
- Lieutenant Georges Raymond: 13 September 1917 – September 1918
- Lieutenant Aime Grasset: September 1918 – 11 October 1918
- Lieutenant Jean Dombray: 11 October 1918 onwards

== Duty stations ==
- Avord: July 1912
- Cachy: 16 April 1916
- Flanders: 12 July 1917

== Notable personnel ==
- Georges Guynemer
- Rene Dorme
- Alfred Heurteaux
- Frank Baylies
- Andre J. Chainat
- Albert Deullin
- Jean Bozon-Verduraz
- Mathieu Tenant de la Tour
- Edwin C. Parsons
- Alfred Auger
- Andre Dubonnet
- Louis Risacher
- Joseph-Henri Guiget
- Georges Raymond

== Aircraft ==
- Bleriot: June 1912
- Morane-Saulnier: 18 March 1915
- Nieuport Scouts: By 20 September 1915
- SPADs

== Operations ==
When France entered World War I, it was attached to the French I Armee. It was subsequently assigned to support of VI Armee and IV Armee in September 1914; it reverted to support of the VI Armee in October.

On 28 January 1917, the unit was posted to the X Armee. It transferred to the VII Armee in March. On 12 July, it moved to support Ier Armee in Flanders. GC 12, including Escadrille 3, was transferred to VI Armee again on 11 December 1917.

Escadrille 3 continued its service within GC 12, as the groupe made the transition to support X Armee on 5 June 1918; to V Armee on 17 July; to Ier Armee on 29 July; and to IV Armee on 18 September 1918.

== See also ==
- Groupe de Combat 12
