= Joseph-Henri Guiguet =

French World War I flying ace

- Born: 10 March 1891; Veyrins-Thuellin, France
- Died: 28 October 1979 (aged 88)
- Military career
- Allegiance: France
- Branch: Flying service
- Rank: Sous lieutenant
- Units: 94 CRP, HF1, Escadrille 95, Escadrille 3, Escadrille 167
- Awards: Légion d'honneur, Médaille militaire, Croix de Guerre

Sous Lieutenant Joseph-Henri Guiguet (10 March 1891 – 28 October 1979) was a French World War I flying ace credited with five aerial victories.

== Biography ==
Guiguet began his mandatory military service on 10 October 1912. In December he was assigned to aviation duty. Originally an observer cum photographer, he was forwarded for pilot's training. On 24 May 1915, he was granted Military Pilot's Brevet No. 968 and assigned to Escadrille 94.

Guiguet was one of the earliest balloon busters, destroying one for his first victory on 22 May 1916; at the time, he was flying a Nieuport for Escadrille 95. After three more victories over enemy airplanes while piloting a Nieuport with Escadrille 3, he was wounded on 23 May 1917. Finally, over a year later, when he was in Escadrille 167, he shared a victory with Bernard Barny de Romanet and became an ace. He ended the war with the Croix de Guerre and Médaille militaire. Postwar, he was made a Chevalier in the Legion d'honneur. On 30 November 1919, he was promoted to lieutenant.
