= Alfred Heurtaux =

French flying ace (1893–1985)

Alfred Heurtaux

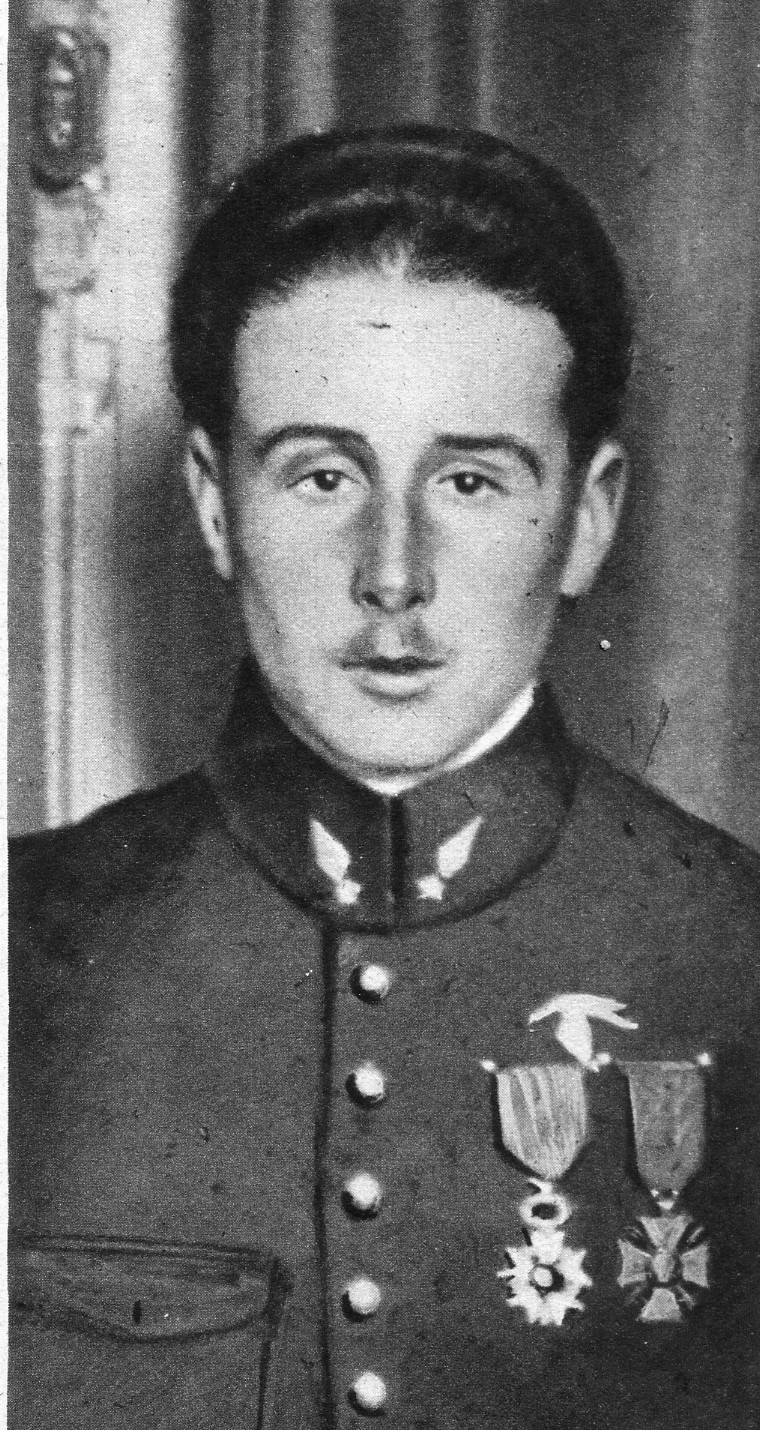
- Born: 20 May 1893; Nantes, France
- Died: 30 December 1985 (aged 92); Chantilly, France
- Burial place: Batignolles, France
- Military career
- Allegiance: France
- Branch: Armée de Terre; Armée de l'Air
- Service years: 1912–1919, 1935–1945
- Rank: Brigadier General
- Nickname: The Bullet Catcher
- Units: Escadrille MS.26; Escadrille MS38; Escadrille 3
- Commands: Escadrille 3
- Awards: Grand Cross of the Légion d'Honneur; Croix de Guerre (Note: Heurtaux received 17 citations for the Croix de Guerre during World War I and three during World War II.); Companion of the Order of Liberation; Knight of the Order of Leopold (Belgian)
- Other work: Member of the French Resistance during World War II.

Alfred Marie-Joseph Heurtaux (20 May 1893 – 30 December 1985) was a French World War I fighter ace credited with 21 victories. Later in his life, he joined the French Resistance during World War II, and survived imprisonment in Buchenwald death camp to become a brigadier general in the post war Armée de l'Air.

== Early military service ==
Born on 20 May 1893 in Nantes, France, Alfred Heurtaux was the son of an artillery officer. He began his military career with his entry into officer training in 1912. In October, 1912, he began an obligatory preliminary year in the ranks of the 4e Regiment d'Hussards. In October 1913, he entered the military academy at Saint Cyr as an officer cadet (aspirant). On 4 August 1914, following the outbreak of World War I, he was commissioned as a sous-lieutenant in the 9e Regiment d'Hussards. In the next three months, he was cited for valor three times. On 6 December 1914, he transferred to aerial service.

== Aerial service ==
He served in Escadrille MS.26 as an aerial observer in Morane-Saulniers. He then passed through pilot's training, being brevetted a pilot on 29 May 1915. He was assigned to Escadrille MS38, another Morane-Saulnier squadron. He was promoted to lieutenant on Christmas Day, 1915. On 5 June 1916, he transferred to a fighter squadron, Escadrille N3, to fly Nieuports. Later, he assumed command of the unit. One of his duties would be coaching Russian ace Ivan Orlov in fighter tactics. Another would entail merging his escadrille with three others to form the world's first fighter wing, Groupe de Combat 12 on 16 October 1916. GC 12 would be better known by its nickname, Les Cigognes (the Storks) for the bird portrayed on their planes.

He scored for the first time on 9 July 1916. Following victories on 16 July, 2 and 3 August, he was awarded the Légion d'Honneur on 4 August.

SPAD S.VII
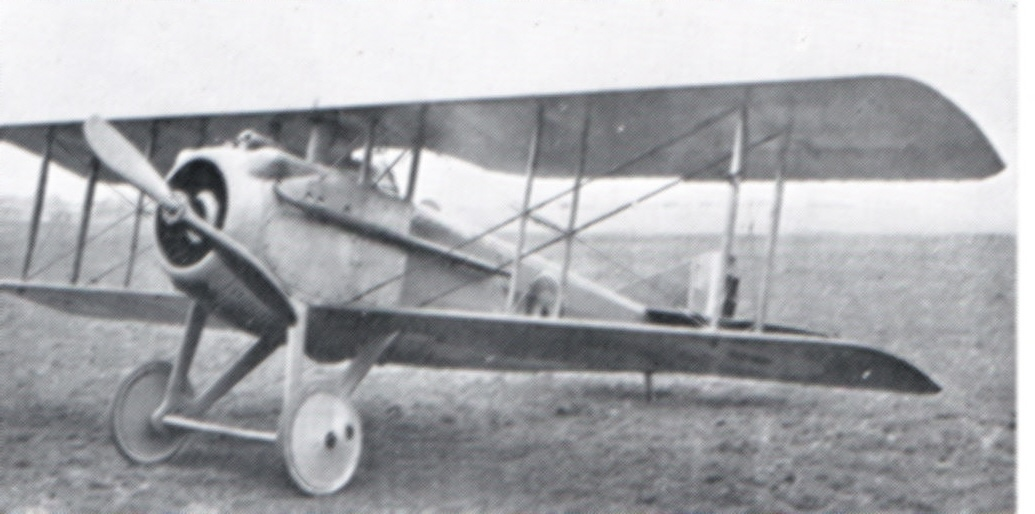
- Spad S.VII such as Heurtaux flew.

He was flying a new Spad S.VII when he downed his fifth victim on 17 August 1916. Later the next month, on the 25th of September, he shot down another pioneer ace, Leutnant Kurt Wintgens, the very first fighter pilot to ever score a victory on July 1, 1915, with a synchronized machine-gun armed aircraft; for victory number eight. He continued to accumulate victories steadily over the next eight months, reaching 21 on 4 May 1917. On 5 May 1917, he was seriously wounded by Ernst Udet. In a dogfight with nine Albatros D.IIIs, he was hit through both cheeks and both thighs, as well as his head being grazed by a near-miss.

He eventually returned to duty, but did not score again. A second serious wounding in September 1917 sidelined him for the remainder of the war. Indeed, he was fortunate to survive a bullet through his femoral artery. An ordinary bullet would have proved fatal, but the incendiary round that hit him cauterized the wound, sealing off hemorrhaging. He struggled back to Allied lines, and lived. When he recovered, he toured the United States of America lecturing on fighter tactics.

Besides his 21 credited wins, he had 13 unconfirmed or probables. He was raised from Chevalier in the Légion d'Honneur to Officer. He also had fifteen palms and two bronze stars to his Croix de Guerre. He attended the awards ceremony on canes.

Heurtaux resigned his commission in October 1919.

== Between the world wars ==
He later became President of the France Fighter Aces Association.

He was elected Deputy for Seine-et-Oise aged 26, in 1919. From there, he moved into the automobile industry, holding a management position with the Ford Motor Company in its American operations. While Heurtaux was in Dearborn with Ford, an autobiographical article under his byline ran in Henry Ford's Dearborn Independent Magazine.

His next job was with General Motors in Europe, and then finally with Renault.

His employment did not hinder his patriotic activities. He was active in the Association of the Reserve Officers of the Air Force, being its president from 1934 to 1937. He was also appointed a lieutenant colonel in the reserves on 25 June 1935. He was reinstated on active duty a few months later, as Inspector of Fighter Aviation.

== World War II and beyond ==
In the early days of World War II, Heurtaux was still the Inspector of Fighter Aviation for the French air forces. After the fall of France to the Germans, he joined the French Resistance. The Legion of Affairs was formed in August 1940, and he was appointed its vice-president. He used the freedom of movement afforded by this appointment to pass military intelligence to his old Saint Cyr classmate, Colonel Groussard, and to recruit fellow veterans into espionage. The Hector network that resulted was an important constituent of the Resistance in northern France.

On 23 January 1941, Heurtaux was made a member of the National Council of Vichy France. Colonel Hertaux's son was arrested just before he himself was taken into custody in March 1941. The Gestapo let him go that time, then arrested him again on 3 November. He would spend over three years in a succession of German jails in Düsseldorf, Bielefeld, Hannover, Berlin, and Potsdam. On 13 March 1945, he was shipped off to Buchenwald; on 11 April, he was liberated when the U.S. Army's 6th Armored Division liberated the camp.

He had been promoted to full colonel in 1942, while he was in custody. On 5 July 1945, he was appointed to the military mission for German business. In December 1945, he was promoted to brigadier general.

== Death ==
He ended his career working as a consulting engineer. He died 30 December 1985, at Chantilly, Oise and was buried in Paris.
