= Jacques Ortoli =

French flying ace

Jacques Toussaint François Ortoli
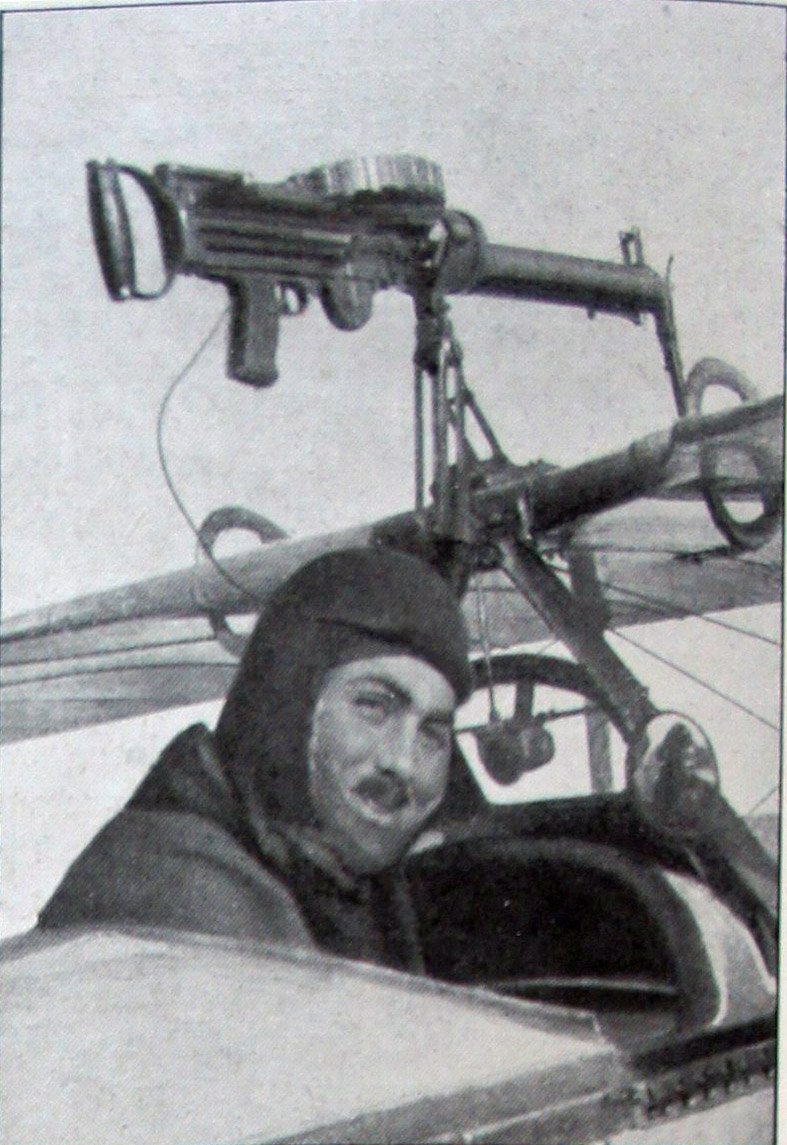
- Jacques Ortoli, a French aviator of the First World War
- Born: 16 July 1895; Poggio di Tallano, France
- Died: 19 June 1947 (aged 51); Tunis, Tunisia
- Military career
- Allegiance: France
- Branch: Aviation
- Service years: 1914–1941; 1943–1945
- Rank: Commandant
- Units: Escadrille 8, Escadrille 31, Escadrille 77, Escadrille 57
- Awards: Légion d'honneur, Médaille militaire, Croix de Guerre with seven Palmes and two étoiles de bronze, Croix de guerre, British Military Cross, Mentioned in Dispatches at least five times

Commandant Jacques Toussaint François Ortoli was a French Corsican patriot who served France in two World Wars. In World War I, he was a flying ace credited with eleven confirmed aerial victories. He returned to his nation's defense during World War II.

== Early life ==
Jacques Toussaint François Ortoli was born in Poggio di Tallano, Corsica on 16 July 1895.

== World War I ==
Ortoli earned his Pilot's Brevet No. 1668 on 26 June 1914, thus barely qualifying as a prewar pilot. He volunteered for French military service for the length of the war on 2 September 1914. He entered as a soldat de 2e classe in the 2e Groupe d'Aviation. On 30 September, he was awarded Military Pilot's Brevet No. 608. On 14 October 1914, he was simultaneously promoted to Corporal and assigned to Escadrille 8.

On 25 February 1915, he was promoted to Sergeant. On 28 April 1915, Ortoli and his observer were credited with using their Farman to down a Rumpler two-seater observation plane in one of history's first aerial victories. On 8 July, Ortoli was medically evacuated to hospital with a head wound. He would not return to action until 7 October, when he arrived at Escadrille 31 as a Nieuport pilot.

On 11 March 1916, he was promoted to Adjutant. On 4 June, he scored the second victory of his career over an LVG. Nine days later, he was awarded the Médaille militaire. On 24 September 1916, he transferred to Escadrille 77. Beginning on 23 January 1917, Ortoli began a string of nine victories that ended on 24 June. With one exception, shared with Joseph M. X. de Sévin and Jean Chaput, they were solo victories.

In the midst of his victory string, on 24 April, he was commissioned a Sous lieutenant, and on 28 May 1917 was appointed Chevalier in the Légion d'honneur.

On 19 April 1918, he was elevated to the rank of Lieutenant. On 10 May, he took command of a Spad squadron, Escadrille 57. By the Armistice, Ortoli had amassed over 1,235 flight hours. He had flown over 500 offensive sorties, and about 400 escort, photographic reconnaissance, or artillery direction sorties. He had survived being shot down twice by anti-aircraft fire.

== Between the World Wars ==
On 7 March 1922, Ortoli resigned from active military service. On 9 November 1927, he was raised to Officier in the Légion d'honneur. He was promoted to Captain in the reserves on 25 June 1934. On 30 March 1935, he was appointed a Commandeur in the Légion d'honneur.

== World War II ==
On 2 September 1939, Ortoli was recalled to active duty. He was demobilized again on 20 February 1941. He was recalled to active duty once again on 3 May 1943, promoted to Commandant on 25 June, and served through on the Allied side until 15 July 1945.

== Honors and awards ==
Médaille Militaire
A pilot of exceptional skill and audacity. On 4 June 1916 he succeeded in downing an enemy plane behind our lines; he had already downed two others in the enemy lines on 28 April 1915 and 21 February 1916. Médaille Militaire citation, 13 June 1916.

Légion d'Honneur
Has downed eight enemy planes. Cited five times in orders and the Médaille Militaire.
