= Escadrille 73 =

Escadrille N 73 - SPA 73
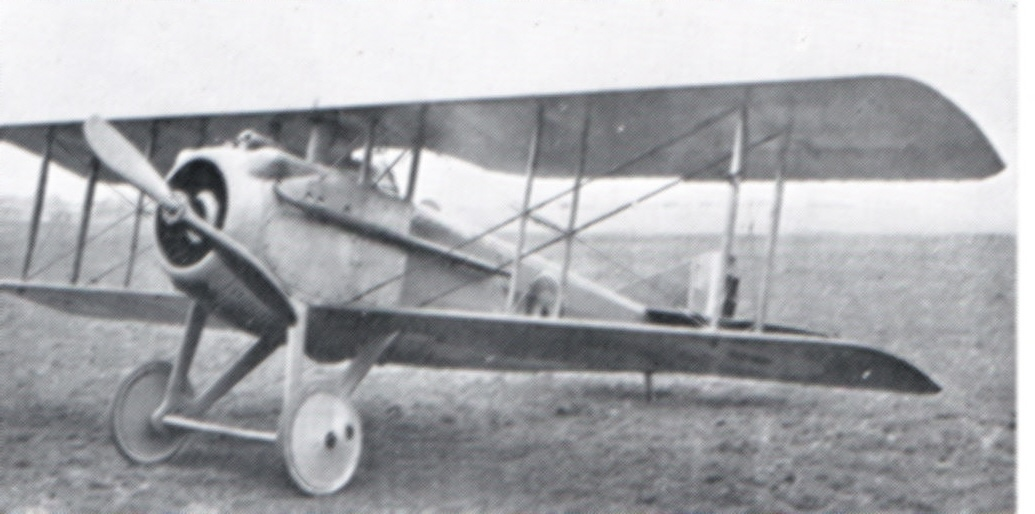
- Spad aircraft
- Country: France
- Branch: French Air Service
- Type: Reconnaissance/Fighter
- Engagements: World War I

Escadrille 73 of the French Air Force originated at Corcieux on 23 May 1915 as Detachment N 49 during the World War I.

== History ==
It was initially assigned to the VII Armee front. On 1 April 1916, it was renamed Detachment Nieuport de Corcieux. On 18 April 1916, it was redesignated, this time as Detachment N73. It became Escadrille N73 on 4 July 1916. On 1 November 1916, it was one of the units gathered into Groupe de Combat 12, along with Escadrille N3, Escadrille N26, and Escadrille N103. The unit became Escadrille Spa73 when it re-equipped with Spad VIIs in January 1917. The escadrille left GC 12 on 18 January 1918, being replaced by Escadrille SPA.67. On 4 October 1918, Escadrille Spa73 was cited in orders as having downed 30 enemy aircraft and an observation balloon.

== Commanding officers ==
- Lieutenant Pierre Bouny
- Lieutenant Honore Lareinty-Tholozan: Killed in flying accident 5 May 1916
- Unknown
- Lieutenant Jean Ricard: 4 July 1916 –
- Capitaine Albert Deullin: 22 February 1917 – 8 February 1918
- Capitaine Pierre Cahuzac: ca 9 February 1918 – ca 2 March 1918
- Lieutenant Maurice Noguès: 3 March 1918 – April 1918
- Lieutenant Robert Gerdes: April 1918 – ca 9 July 1918
- Lieutenant Pierre Jaille: 10 July 1918 – ?

== Notable personnel ==
- Capitaine Albert Deullin
- Lieutenant François Battesti

== Aircraft ==
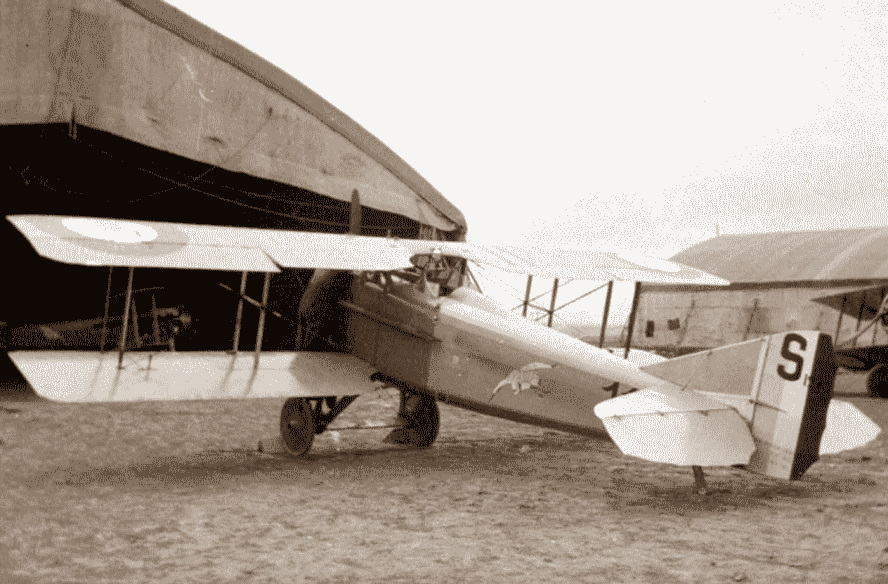
François Battesti's SPAD VII at the Escadrille 73 in 1917.

- Nieuport
- Nieuport 24
- Spad VII: Received January 1917
