= Escadrille 26 =

French Air Force military unit

Escadrille MS 26 - N 26 - SPA 26
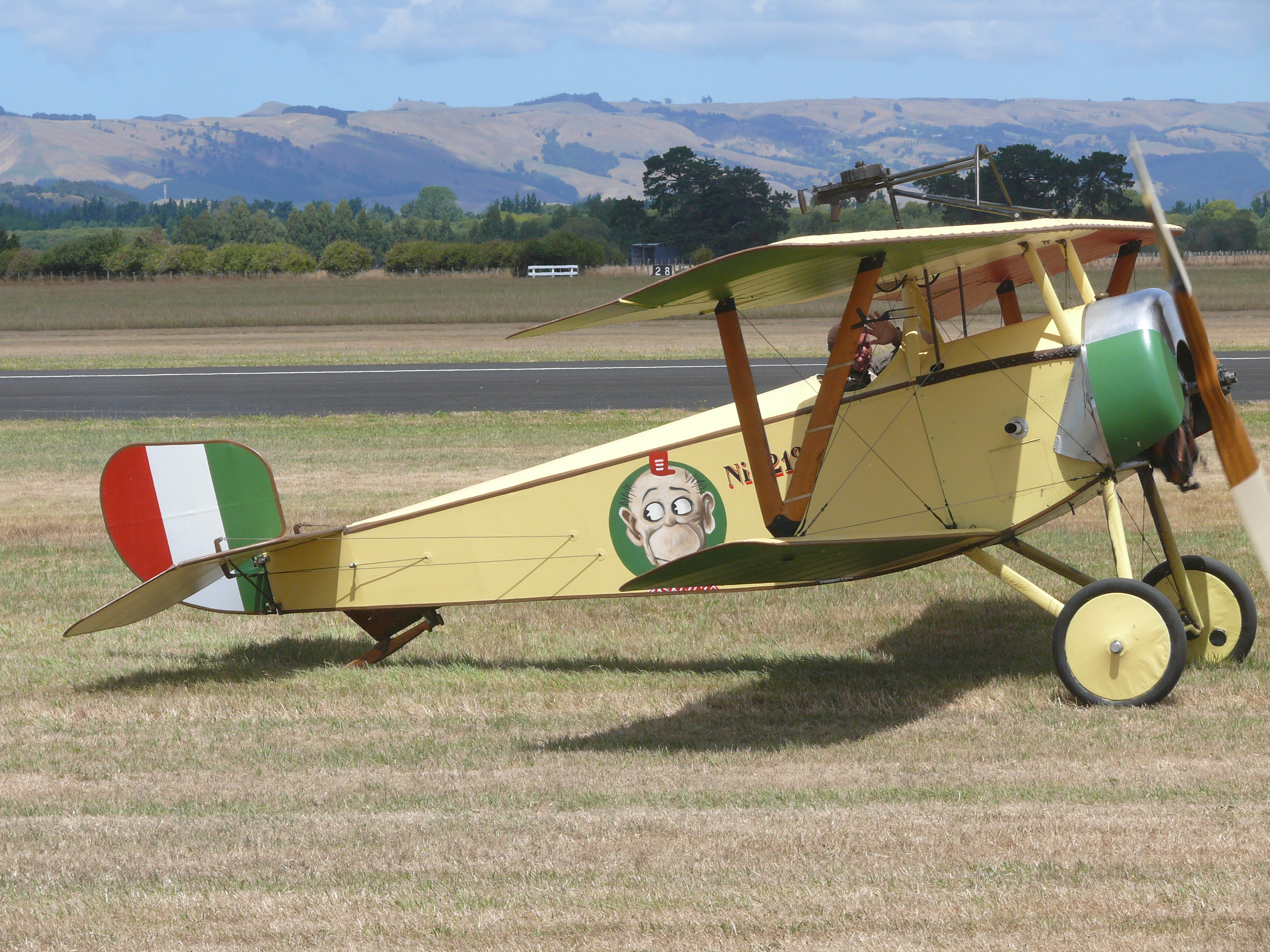
- Nieuport 11
- Active: August 1914
- Branch: French Air Service
- Type: Pursuit Squadron
- Engagements: World War I

Escadrille 26 is a squadron of the French Air Force founded in 1914 and still active today.

== History ==
Escadrille 26 was founded on 26 August 1914, at Arras. It was originally equipped with Morane-Saulnier aircraft, leading to its designation as Escadrille MS26. It went into action attached to VI Armée of the French ground forces until 24 September 1914; it then switched bases to the Kingdom of Belgium.

During 1915, it re-armed with Nieuport 11s, and became Escadrille N26. In June 1916, it moved to Cachy to join an improvised formation, Groupe de Combat de la Somme. This groupe initially consisted of three other units in addition to Escadrille N26—Escadrille N3, Escadrille N103, and Escadrille N73 and became the famous Fighter Squadron Storks (Escadrille des Cigognes) . Command of the groupe was granted to Capitaine Antonin Brocard. On 1 November 1916, the groupe was formalized as Groupe de Combat 12, Brocard commanding.

On 16 April 1917, GC 12 switched from VIII Armée's theater of operations to that of X Armée and VII Armée; they were then involved in the Second Battle of the Aisne. During July 1917, the escadrille moved to Flanders to aid 1er Armée. On 11 December 1917, it would return to VII Armée. As the year ended, the escadrille restocked with SPADs, becoming Escadrille SPA 26.

In January 1918, SPA 26 was posted to IV Armée. It moved to VI Armée in March, and X Armée in June. It began July 1918 with V Armée, and moved to 1er Armée on the 29th. On 18 September 1918, the escadrille was posted back to IV Armée, and remained there until war's end.

On 12 January 1919, Escadrille SPA 26 was cited by IV Armée for the destruction of 51 enemy aircraft and the disability of 70 more.

Escadrille SPA 26 is still current in today's French Air Force.

== Commanding officers ==
- Capitaine Robert Jannerod: 26 August 1914 - January 1915
- Capitaine Pierre de Malherbe: January 1915 - November 1915
- Capitaine Thobie: mid-November 1915
- Capitaine Jacques de Sieyes de Veynes: 17 May 1916 - POW 3 July 1916
- Capitaine Victor Menard: July 1916 - April 1917
- Capitaine Mathieu Tenant de la Tour: April 1917 - Killed in flying accident 17 December 1917
- Capitaine Joseph M. X. de Sévin: 25 December 1917 - end of war

== Notable personnel ==
- Lieutenant Roland Garros
- Lieutenant Marcel Bernard
- Major general Joseph M. X. de Sévin
- Sous lieutenant Noël de Rochefort
- Adjutant Gustave Naudin
- Maréchal-des-logis Constant Soulier

== Aircraft ==
- Morane-Saulnier: 26 August 1914
- Nieuport 11: 1915
- Nieuport 17
- SPAD
