= Escadrille Spa.93 =

- Active: 1917–1918
- Country: France
- Branch: French Air Service
- Type: Fighter Squadron
- Battle honours: Mentioned in dispatches

Escadrille Spa.93 (originally Escadrille N.93) was a French fighter squadron active during World War I from 26 April 1917 until war's end. On 4 October 1918, they were Mentioned in dispatches for their battle performance. By the 11 November 1918 ceasefire, the escadrille was credited with the destruction of 35 enemy aircraft.

== History ==
At the VII Armee airfield of Corcieux, detachments N501 and N506 were melded into a Nieuport squadron, Escadrille N.93, on 26 April 1917. It was one of the squadrons merged into Groupe de Combat 15 on 27 July 1917 to support II Armee. In November 1917, they began to re-equip with new fighters, both SPAD S.7s and SPAD S.13s, and became Escadrille Spa.93. The squadron continued to serve as part of Groupe de Combat 15 even as the Groupe was consolidated into Escadre de Combat No. 1. On 4 October 1918, the Escadre and its constituent units were Mentioned in dispatches. By war's end on 11 November 1918, Escadrille Spa.93 was credited with 35 aerial victories.

== Commanding officers ==
- Lieutenant Jean Moreau: 26 April 1917 - 26 August 1918
- Lieutenant Jean-Louis Moy: 26 August 1918 - 18 October 1918
- Lieutenant Charles Lafarge: 18 October 1918 - war's end

== Notable members ==
- Corporal Eugene Bullard
- Sous lieutenant Gustave Daladier
- Adjutant Pierre Delage
- Sergeant Pierre Ducornet

== Aircraft ==
- Nieuports: 26 April 1917 - c. November 1917
- SPAD S.7: c. November 1917 - war's end
- SPAD S.13: c. November 1917 - war's end
