= Georg Meyer (aviator) =

German World War I flying ace

- Born: 11 January 1893; Bremen, German Empire
- Died: 15 September 1926 (aged 33)
- Military career
- Allegiance: Germany
- Branch: Air Service
- Service years: 1911–1912, 1914–1926
- Rank: Leutnant
- Units: Flieger-Abteilung 69; Flieger-Abteilung (Artillerie) 253; Jagdstaffel 22; Jagdstaffel 7; Jagdstaffel 37
- Commands: Jagdstaffel 37
- Awards: House Order of Hohenzollern; Iron Cross First and Second Class; Bremen's Hanseatic Cross
- Other work: Head of aviation training school at Magdeburg

Leutnant Georg Meyer (11 January 1893 – 15 September 1926) was a German World War I fighter ace credited with confirmed victories over six enemy observation balloons and 18 enemy aircraft .

Meyer was one of the early German military aviators, volunteering on 1 February 1916. He would serve through the end of the war, rising to squadron command in the process. He would be recommended for Germany's highest award for valor, the Pour le Merite.

Meyer remained in aviation postwar, and was head of aviation training at Magdeburg when he was killed in a motorcycle accident.

== Early life ==
Georg Meyer was born in Bremen in the German Empire on 11 January 1893. His father was a merchant. After George Meyer completed elementary and high school, he went to work for the customs service from 1911 to 1912. He also completed his required military service.

He joined Infantry Regiment No. 75 in 1911. Just before World War I began, he was conscripted into the Guards Ersatz Division. He went into battle with the Guards in France.

== Aerial service during World War I ==
Meyer transferred to duty with Die Fliegertruppen des deutschen Kaiserreiches on 1 February 1916. By 18 August, he had been trained and was piloting a two-seater reconnaissance craft for Feldflieger Abteilung 69 in Macedonia. From there, he transferred to flying two-seaters on artillery direction duty with Flieger-Abteilung (Artillerie) 253 on the Western Front. On 7 February 1917, he scored his first aerial victory, downing a Nieuport over Lemmes, France.

In April 1917, he was transferred to fly single-seater fighters with Jasta 22. He had two unconfirmed victories there; then Josef Jacobs transferred to Jasta 7 on 2 August, taking Meyer with him. Meyer ran his score to four confirmed and two unconfirmed victories before being posted on to Jasta 37 on 25 March 1918. He ascended to command as Staffelführer on 14 April 1918. In June, the unit re-equipped with Fokker D.VIIs, and Meyer began to quickly accumulate victories. He became a balloon buster, with six confirmed and two unconfirmed. He was also credited with an additional 18 enemy airplanes destroyed, with two more claims unconfirmed. On 18 October 1918, he was lightly wounded and remained on duty.

He had been awarded both classes of the Iron Cross, his native Bremen's Hanseatic Cross, as well as the Knight's Cross with Swords of the House Order of Hohenzollern. On 5 November 1918, he was recommended for the Blue Max. The recommendation died with the German Empire upon the emperor's abdication.

== Post World War I ==
On 22 January 1920, the Prussian National Assembly decided that Meyer should be awarded the Blue Max later. However, it is uncertain if this ever happened.

Meyer remained in aviation. By 1926, he was head of the airline training school at Magdeburg.

Georg Meyer was killed in a motorcycle accident on 15 September 1926.

== See also ==
- Aerial victory standards of World War I
- List of World War I aces credited with 20 or more victories
- http://www.theaerodrome.com/aces/germany/meyer2.php lists his aerial victories
