= Ducornet =

Ducornet may refer to:

- Louis Joseph César Ducornet, the French painter (1806–1856)
- Pierre Ducornet, French World War I flying ace (1898–1963)
- Rikki Ducornet, The American artist and writer (1949- )
