= Jagdstaffel 50 =

Jasta 50
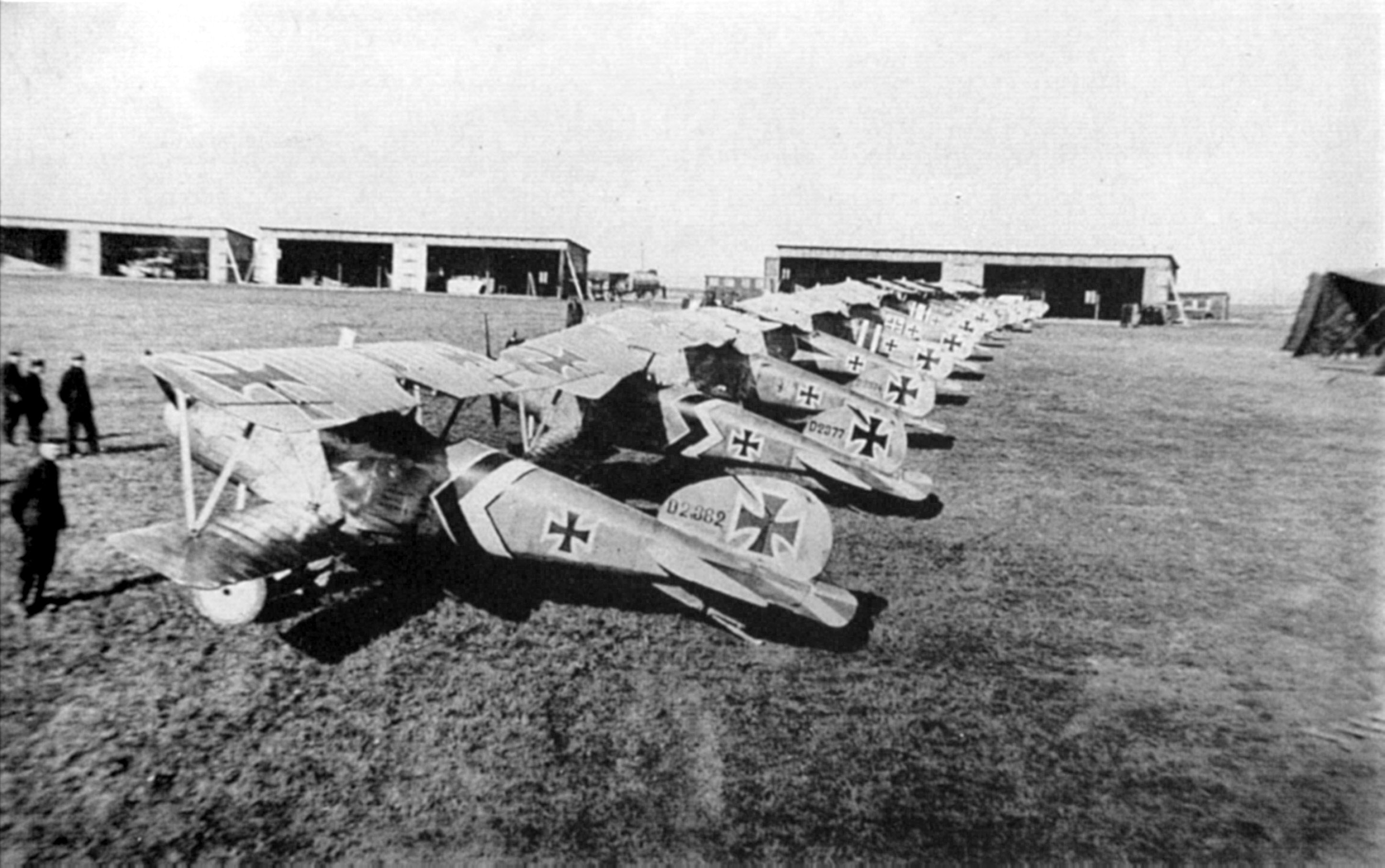
- A lineup of Albatros D.III fighters of Jagdstaffel 50 - mid to late 1917. The subdued staffel scheme of black and white stripes and chevrons can be seen on the fuselage and tailplanes of most machines, which are otherwise in factory finish.
- Active: 1917–1918
- Country: German Empire
- Branch: Luftstreitkräfte
- Type: Fighter squadron
- Engagements: World War I

Royal Prussian Jagdstaffel 50, commonly abbreviated to Jasta 50, was a "hunting group" (i.e., fighter squadron) of the Luftstreitkräfte, the air arm of the Imperial German Army during World War I. The squadron would score over 45 aerial victories during the war, including 14 observation balloons downed. The unit's victories came at the expense of five killed in action, one wounded in action, and three taken prisoner of war. The squadron was disbanded on 17 January 1919.

== History ==
Jasta 50 was founded at Flieger-Abteilung (Flier Detachment) 13, Bromberg, on 23 December 1917. It moved forward into action with 7 Armee on 11 January 1918. The squadron's initial commanding officer downed an enemy observation balloon for its first aerial victory on 25 January 1918. In September 1918, Jasta 50 was transferred to 3 Armee. On 21 October 1918, it was transferred again, to 18 Armee. The squadron was disbanded after Germany's defeat, being demobilized on 17 January 1919.

== Commanding officers (Staffelführer) ==
- Heinrich Arntzen: 13 January 1918 — 27 May 1918 (WIA)
- Hans von Freden: 27 May 1918 — 17 January 1919

== Duty stations ==
- Autremencourt, France: 11 January 1918
- Marchais, France
- Mont St Martin, France
- Rocourt-Saint-Martin, France
- Rugny Ferme
- Montbanis Ferme
- Perles, France
- Sisson
- Boncourt
- Leffincourt, France: September 1918
- Attigny, France
- Chémery
- Morville: 21 October 1918
- Saint-Gérard

== Aircraft ==
Initially flying the Albatros D.III from January 1918, it was later upgraded with the Albatros D.V, and then re-equipped with Fokker D.VII fighters by 28 August 1918.
