= Hans von Freden =

- Born: 18 March 1892; Berlin, Germany
- Died: 30 October 1919 (aged 27); Stettin, Pomerania, present day Poland
- Military career
- Allegiance: Germany
- Branch: Aviation
- Rank: Leutnant
- Units: Feldflieger Abteilung 48; Flieger-Abteilung 10; Jagdstaffel 72; Jagdstaffel 1
- Commands: Jagdstaffel 50
- Awards: Knight's Cross with Swords of the Royal House Order of Hohenzollern; Iron Cross

Leutnant Hans von Freden (18 March 1892 – 30 October 1919) was a German World War I flying ace credited with 20 aerial victories.

== Early life and service ==
Hans von Freden was born on 18 March 1892 in Berlin. As World War I broke out, he volunteered to serve in Field Artillery Regiment No. 18 of the German army. On 19 October 1914, he went into battle. In March 1915, he was promoted to Vizewachmeister (a non-commissioned officer). He was promoted to Leutnant on 30 July 1915. Beginning in January 1916, he commanded two anti-aircraft batteries, one after another, until transferring to aviation duty.

== Aerial service ==
Later in 1916, Freden began training as an aerial observer with FFA 48 (subsequently redubbed as FA 10 on 2 August 1916). While serving with them, he was wounded on 24 August 1916.

Freden went for pilot's training in June 1917. After graduation, he was posted to Italy to join Royal Prussian Jagdstaffel 1 on 27 November 1917. He began his string of aerial victories while assigned to them, when he shot down an observation balloon at Spresiano on 29 January 1918. He furthered his career as a balloon buster by downing two more, on 31 January and 5 February respectively. On 18 March, he was transferred to the Western Front to fly with Jagdstaffel 72. On 25 March, Jasta 1 was shifted to the Western Front, and Freden rejoined them the following day. He rounded out his career with Jasta 1 with his fourth win, over a Spad fighter, on 9 June 1918.

Beginning 11 June 1918, he assumed command of Royal Prussian Jagdstaffel 50. He scored four times in July, but skipped August. Sometime during his run of six victories in September, he upgraded to a Fokker D.VII, which he emblazoned with his family coat of arms. Having previously won both classes of the Iron Cross, on 20 September Freden was awarded the Knight's Cross with Swords of the House Order of Hohenzollern. He scored his 20th and last victory, the one that qualified him for Pour le Mérite recommendation, on 10 November, the day before the war ended. His final tally was nine observation balloons and eleven enemy airplanes downed.

== Postwar ==
Freden did not long survive the war. He died of influenza less than a year later, on 30 October 1919, at Stettin.
