= Carl Menckhoff =

German World War I flying ace

- Born: 14 April 1883; Herford, Westphalia, German Empire
- Died: 11 January 1949 (aged 65); Switzerland
- Military career
- Allegiance: German Empire
- Branch: Luftstreitkräfte
- Service years: 1914–1918
- Rank: Oberleutnant
- Unit: Jagdstaffel 3
- Commands: Jagdstaffel 72
- Awards: Pour le Mérite; Royal House Order of Hohenzollern; Iron Cross First and Second Class
- Other work: Businessman in Germany and Switzerland

Carl Menckhoff (14 April 1883 – 11 January 1949) was a German First World War fighter ace. He was credited with 39 confirmed victories, the majority over opposing fighter aces. In his 30s when he learned to fly in February 1915, he was one of the oldest pilots in the Luftstreitkräfte. After being severely wounded in infantry service, Menckhoff transferred to Jagdstaffel 3 (Hunting Team 3) as a vizefeldwebel (staff sergeant), afterwards being commissioned as an officer. He won the German Empire's most prestigious decoration, the Pour le Mérite ("Blue Max"), and was given command of Jagdstaffel 72 (Hunting squadron 72).

After being shot down and taken prisoner on 25 July 1918, he remained a POW until August 1919 when he escaped to Switzerland. He returned to Germany, where he succeeded in business, but where he was arrested in 1938 for currency law violations. Following his purchased release from Nazi custody he moved to Switzerland, where he remained until his death in 1949.

== Early life ==
Carl Menckhoff was born in Herford, Westphalia, in the Kingdom of Prussia on 14 April 1883. He was one of a family of at least eight and possibly ten siblings. His father ran a successful linen weaving mill, the Herforder Leinen-Verein Wilhelm Menckhoff, in which Carl was apprenticed and was later employed after his own business failed.

As a young man, Menckhoff was keenly interested in motor cars, and probably participated in balloon flights with his brother Willi, who held a balloon pilot's license. Menckhoff believed that this background helped his later application to join the Luftstreitkräfte (Air Force).

== Military service ==
Menckhoff reported for military service as a "one-year volunteer" at age 20 in 1903, but was invalided out after six weeks observation in a military hospital with suspected appendicitis.

In August 1914, on the outbreak of war, the 31 year old Menckhoff enlisted in Infantry Regiment Nr. 106. He served on the Western Front, seeing action against the French in the vicinity of Châlons-en-Champagne and on the River Suippe, and later against the British in the vicinity of Armentières. He was wounded several times and received the Iron Cross First Class and Second Class for gallantry, both by the end of 1914.

== Aerial service ==
=== From infantry duty to aviation service ===
Left unfit for infantry service by his injuries, Menckhoff applied for transfer to the Die Fliegertruppen des deutschen Kaiserreiches (Aviation Troops for the German Empire), and was accepted for pilot training in February 1915. Having qualified, he was posted in October 1915 back to the Western Front, to an airfield at Pergnies-Quessey, near Saint-Quentin, where he was again wounded during an aerial engagement in January 1916. He was transferred to the Eastern Front in April 1916, to be stationed at an airfield near Ashmyany. Here he gained useful flying experience but limited experience of combat. He trained as a single-seat combat pilot at Warsaw. At the end of 1916 he became a flight instructor in Cologne, and in January 1917 was promoted to Vizefeldwebel (staff sergeant). He then returned to the Western Front, assigned as a fighter pilot to one of the original German fighter squadrons, Jagdstaffel 3 (Hunting Team 3), at that time stationed at Fontaine-Uterte near Saint-Quentin, and equipped with the Albatros D.III fighter. Rather unusually, his aircraft bore no squadron livery, but was painted with personal markings of green and white stripes curving down the length of its fuselage. A large red letter 'M' adorned the fuselage just aft of the cockpit. (Note: The airplanes of German fighter squadrons customarily were painted in a common one or two color scheme, with pilots' personal insignias superimposed. It would be unusual for an airplane to bear only a pilot's personal insignia.)

Menckhoff scored his first victory on 5 April 1917, downing a Nieuport 23 fighter of No. 29 Squadron RFC. The victories began to mount rapidly after that, though Menckhoff often returned from victorious flights shaken by his triumphs. He became an ace on 9 May, when he downed his fifth victim. Continuing to score, Menckhoff scored his 11th victory on 14 September; all of the planes he downed were fighters. This was shortly before Menckhoff's tangential involvement in one of the most momentous air battles of the war.

=== Possible involvement in the Voss dogfight ===
On 23 September 1917, one of Germany's leading aces returned from leave. On a morning sortie, he shot down an enemy aircraft for the 48th time. Then twenty-year-old Werner Voss in his brand-new silver-blue Fokker Triplane led his squadron into a sky swarming with several squadrons of airplanes aloft from both sides. Outdistancing his wingmen, Voss launched a solo attack on a formation of eight British SE-5a fighters from No. 56 Squadron RFC. Unfortunately for Voss, all eight British pilots were veteran aces; their leader was the redoubtable James McCudden. During the resulting lengthy dogfight, a red-nosed Albatros came to the aid of the beleaguered Voss, only for the savior to be driven out of the fray.

For many years, it was thought this red-nosed Albatros was flown by Menckhoff, despite the red nose not being one of his airplane markings. However, in 2013, Hannes Täger published an edited edition of Menckhoff's memoirs, and they make no mention of Voss's fatal 23 September 1917 engagement.

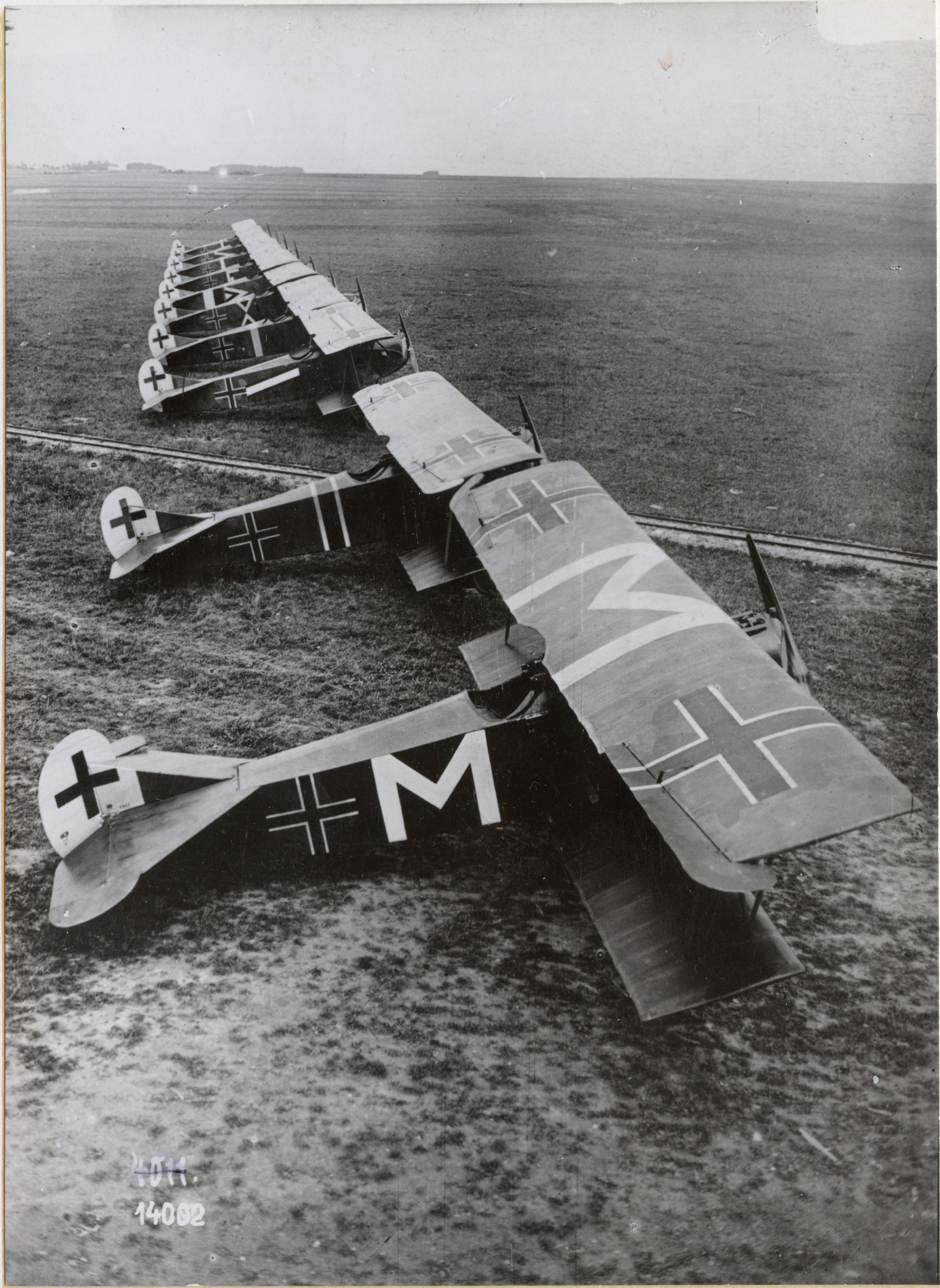
Menckhoff's Fokker D.VII was marked with prominent letter "M"s. Jagdstaffel 72 flightline, Bergnicourt, July 1918

In October, Menckhoff was promoted and commissioned as a Leutnant der Reserve. In December he was awarded the Hohenzollern House Order, Knight's Cross 2nd Class with Swords. By 4 February 1918 his victories totaled 20, with all of them scored with Jagdstaffel 3, and every one of them a downed British fighter.

=== Menckhoff in command ===
On 11 February, he was assigned command of Saxon Jagdstaffel 72 at Leffincourt as its initial Staffelführer (Squadron Leader). His first victory leading his new squadron came on 1 April 1918, when he shot down a Breguet 14 as his first bomber victim, and 21st overall. He would score four more victories in April before his Pour le Mérite came through on the 23rd, the day after his 25th victory. (Note: Nomination for the Pour le Mérite happened after a fighter pilot's 20th victory, if he had already successively won both the Second and First Class Iron Crosses and the House Order of Hohenzollern. There were no posthumous awards.)

While it took Menckhoff almost nine months for his score of victories with Jagdstaffel 3, it took him only four months leading Jagdstaffel 72 to shoot down 19 additional enemy aircraft. After that 1 April victory as his squadron's first, he accumulated a steady stream of victims, with his 39th victory being over a SPAD on 19 July 1918. Victories over enemy fighters continued to predominate on Menckhoff's roll of victims.

He led his squadron into combat from its airstrips at Leffincourt and Bergnicourt. His careful leadership style conserved his men's lives; while Jagdstaffel 72 inflicted 60 losses on its enemies, it lost only one pilot. Menckhoff's personal victories with the squadron amounted to about a third of the unit's successes.

=== Downfall and capture ===
On 25 July 1918, three days after his 39th victory, while flying an evening patrol in one of his two Fokker D.VIIs, Menckhoff engaged elements of the United States Air Service. During the ensuing dogfight, Menckhoff was shot down by American Lieutenant Walter Avery of the 95th Aero Squadron, United States Air Service. When Avery maneuvered onto Menckhoff's tail, the German ace cut his engine and dropped in a falling leaf pattern of zigzagging side-slips. Avery instantly did the same. When they recovered from the side-slips by switching their engines back on, Avery was in position to shoot Menckhoff down.

Captured by French troops at the crash site, Menckhoff was chagrined to learn that Avery was a rookie pilot on his first combat flight. Avery arrived at the crash site and respectfully refused to remove the Pour le Merite from Menckhoff's throat as a souvenir. Instead, Avery cut a fabric letter "M" from the crashed Fokker's covering as a keepsake before Menckhoff was led away by French soldiers.

Following interrogation, Menckhoff was held as a prisoner of war, along with many other German pilots, at Camp Montoire, near Orléans, France. He was still a captive when the armistice ended the war on 11 November 1918.

== Post-war years ==
Menckhoff remained a prisoner in France until August 1919. Despairing of his release, he escaped. Travelling on foot, by rail, and at one point in a stolen car, he managed to reach Switzerland eight days later, crossing the border near Mont Salève and making his way to Geneva. He subsequently returned to Germany and to Herford. In 1920 he moved to Berlin. Here he became manager of an airline, the Deutsche Luft Lloyd GmbH, but this failed in 1922–3. In the late 1920s he founded a heating company, the Caliqua Wärmegesellschaft MBH. This was rather successful. He was able to expand his company internationally, into France and to Switzerland.

He established a second residence in Switzerland, but in October 1938, when crossing the German-Swiss border at Basel, he was found to be carrying an illegal quantity of Swiss francs. He was arrested by the Nazi customs authorities and held in custody for more than eight months. He was forced to surrender many of his business shares and patents to them. Menckhoff was released in May 1939. It was during this incarceration that he wrote the original memoir of his First World War experiences. Upon his release, Menckhoff was threatened with further punishment. In the autumn of 1939 he moved to Switzerland permanently. Menckhoff settled in a villa in the grounds of Angenstein Castle, which was owned by his wife's family.

Carl Menckhoff died of complications following surgery on 11 January 1949. He was buried in Basel's Wolfgottesacker.

== Personal life ==
In a news article describing his capture, Menckhoff is described as well-built, blond, with a well-trimmed mustache. He reportedly spoke fluent French and English.

Menckhoff married five times:

- In June 1905 to Elisabeth Alice Seyer. The marriage produced three daughters: Edelgarde, Elisabeth and Margot. It was subsequently dissolved.
- In 1920 to Elisabeth ("Eli") Altmann. The couple divorced after three months.
- In 1922 to Irmgard Dittrich. The marriage produced a daughter, Doris. The couple divorced in 1925.
- In April 1926 to Anne-Marie Braun. The marriage produced a son, Carl Wilhelm. The couple separated in 1928; and the marriage was dissolved in 1936.
- In 1936 to Leonore Quincke (1904–1980). The marriage produced a son, Karl Gerhard Georg Friedrich.

== Legacy ==
In May 2007, the ace's youngest son, Karl Gerhard Menckhoff, was living in Washington, DC. He was unaware of his father's combat heroics until after the ace died. Also living in the Washington area was the daughter of the ace's conqueror. When she learned Karl Gerhard lived nearby, she decided to surprise him by returning the fabric souvenir 'M' from the Fokker D.VII to the Menckhoff family. The souvenir of the deceased Carl Menckhoff was accepted by Gerhard, with the proviso that he would pass it along to his own, Carl Menckhoff, the ace's grandson.

== Sources ==
Memoir

- Täger, Hannes, ed. (2013). Carl Menckhoff: Reminiscenses of War and Captivity: a Knight of the Pour le Mérite Reports. Indio, CA: Aeronaut Books. ISBN 978-1-935881-17-9.

Secondary published sources

- Diggens, Barry (2012). September Evening: The Life and Final Combat of the German World War One Ace Werner Voss. London: Grub Street. ISBN 978-1-904010-47-0.
- Franks, Norman; Bailey, Frank W.; Guest, Russell (1993). Above the Lines: The Aces and Fighter Units of the German Air Service, Naval Air Service and Flanders Marine Corps, 1914–1918. London: Grub Street. ISBN 0-948817-73-9.
- Franks, Norman; Guest, Russell; Bailey, Frank W. (1995). Bloody April ... Black September. London: Grub Street. ISBN 1-898697-08-6.
- Franks, Norman; Giblin, Hal (1997). Under the Guns of the German Aces: Immelmann, Voss, Göring, Lothar von Richthofen: The Complete Record of Their Victories and Victims. London: Grub Street. ISBN 978-1-898697-72-5.
- Franks, Norman; VanWyngarden, Greg (2004). Fokker D VII Aces of World War 1: Part 2. Oxford UK: Osprey. ISBN 978-1-84176-729-1.
- Guttman, Jon; Dempsey, Harry (2008). Sopwith Camel Vs Fokker Dr I: Western Front 1917–18. Oxford UK: Osprey. ISBN 978-1-84603-293-6.
- Handleman, Philip (2003). Combat in the Sky: the Art of Aerial Warfare. Unknown location: Zenith Imprint. ISBN 978-0-7603-1468-5.
- Kennett, Lee (1990). The First Air War: 1914–1918. Unknown location: Free Press/MacMillan. ISBN 978-0-02-917301-5.
- Treadwell, Terry C.; Wood, Alan C. (2003). German Fighter Aces of World War One. Stroud: Tempus. ISBN 978-0-7524-2808-6.

Online

- "Who's Who – Carl Menckhoff". firstworldwar.com.
- "Dogfight trophy of 1918 returned". Washington Times. 11 May 2007.
