= Jagdstaffel 37 =

Jasta 37
- Active: 1917–1918
- Country: German Empire
- Branch: Luftstreitkräfte
- Type: Fighter squadron
- Engagements: World War I

Royal Prussian Jagdstaffel 37, commonly abbreviated to Jasta 37, was a "hunting group" (i.e., fighter squadron) of the Luftstreitkräfte, the air arm of the Imperial German Army during World War I. The unit would score over 70 aerial victories during the war, including 13 observation balloons downed. The squadron's victories came at the expense of seven killed in action, two killed in flying accidents, three wounded in action, and three taken prisoner of war.

== History ==
Jasta 37 was founded on 10 January 1917 at Fliegerersatz-Abteilung (Replacement Detachment) 8, Graudenz. It flew its first combat missions on 23 March, and scored its first victory on 13 April 1917. It would serve until war's end, when the Luftstreitkräfte was disbanded.

== Commanding officers (Staffelführer) ==
1. Kurt Grasshoff : circa 10 March 1917
2. Ernst Udet: 7 November 1917
3. Gustav Gobert: 24 March 1918
4. Georg Meyer: 5 April 1918

== Duty stations ==
1. Möntingen: 10 March 1917
2. Wynghene: 18 July 1917
3. With 6 Armee: 5 August 1917
4. Wynghene: October 1917
5. Le Cateau: 15 March 1918
6. St. Christ: Unknown date

== Notable personnel ==
- Wilhelm Bittrich
- Kurt Grasshoff
- Heinrich Henkel
- Georg Mayer
- Ernst Udet
- Hans Waldhausen

== Operations ==
Jasta 37 began operations in the Armee-Abteilung A sector on or before 10 March 1917. It moved to support 4 Armee on 18 July 1917. It moved to support 6 Armee on 5 August, returning to serve with 4 Armee in October. On 15 March 1918, the squadron moved to support 2 Armee.
