= William Ernest Shields =

Canadian First World War flying ace

- Born: 15 October 1892; Toronto, Ontario, Canada
- Died: 1 August 1921 (aged 28); High River, Alberta, Canada
- Military career
- Allegiance: British Empire
- Branch: Royal Flying Corps, Royal Air Force
- Service years: 1915-ca 1919
- Rank: Captain
- Unit: No. 41 Squadron RAF
- Awards: Distinguished Flying Cross (with Bar in lieu of a second award)
- Other work: Flew forest fire spotting missions for Dominion air patrol.

William Ernest Shields DFC & Bar (15 October 1892 – 1 August 1921) was a Canadian First World War flying ace, officially credited with 24 victories.

== Early life ==
William Ernest Shields was born on 15 October 1892 in Toronto, Ontario, Canada, the son of W. H. Shields. Not quite a year after the British declaration of war at the start of World War I dragged Canada into the war, the younger Shields joined the Canadian Expeditionary Force. As was customary for Canadians entering the military at that time, he filled out an Attestation Paper. The date he joined is filled in next to his signature of "W. E. Shields" below his oath of allegiance to King George V; it was 25 March 1915.

The reverse of the Attestation Paper shows that the examining medical officer measured him as being five feet five inches tall, with an expanded chest measurement of 36 inches. He had a fair complexion, brown eyes, and light brown hair.

== Aerial service in the First World War ==
Shields' military service details are unknown before he joined the Royal Flying Corps. His known history begins with his posting to No. 41 Squadron RAF on 20 March 1918. There he joined two other Canadian aces, William Claxton and Frederick McCall.

Shields was assigned a Royal Aircraft Factory SE.5a to fly. With it, he began his victory list on 12 June 1918, driving a German Albatros D.V down out of control over Guerbigny, France. It was the start of a victory tally that would make him an ace several times over; he also became proficient at the hazardous mission of balloon busting.

By the time Shields scored his final victories on 4 November 1918, a week before war's end, they totaled 24. He was an ace on observation balloons alone, being credited with destroying five of them. He also destroyed 11 enemy fighter planes, and drove down eight out of control. His valour was rewarded with two awards of the Distinguished Flying Cross and the rank of captain.

== Post First World War ==
Shields returned to Canada. He married a Miss Nicholson on 22 June 1921 while living in Portage la Prairie. As he was employed by the Dominion's air patrol, he moved to High River, Alberta as the acting sub-station superintendent of this station. His flying duties there included the aerial spotting of forest fires over the eastern Rocky Mountains, including the Red Deer area.

On 1 August 1921, he and wireless operator G. H. Harding were going to fly west of Red Deer. Shields took off at 0737 hours. At an altitude of about 50 feet, the plane side-slipped into a nose-diving crash. Though Harding suffered only minor injuries, Shields died from a fracture to the back of his skull, dying a few minutes after being pulled from the wreckage.

== Text of award citations ==
=== Distinguished Flying Cross ===
"Lieut. William Ernest Shields. A gallant officer who inspires others by his courage and dash. In six weeks he destroyed six enemy aircraft and drove down three others out of control. On one occasion he, single-handed, engaged three scouts, driving down two of them."

=== Distinguished Flying Cross - Bar ===
"Lt. (A./Capt.) William Ernest Shields, D.F.C. (FRANCE) Bold in attack and skilful in manoeuvre, this officer is conspicuous for his success and daring in aerial combats. On 22 September, when on offensive patrol, he was attacked by fourteen Fokkers; he succeeded in shooting down one. On another occasion he was attacked by six scouts and destroyed one of these. In all, since 28 June, this officer has accounted for fourteen enemy aircraft."
