= Malcolm Plaw MacLeod =

Canadian flying ace

- Born: 24 January 1897; Ontario, Canada
- Died: 22 February 1960 (aged 63); Toronto, Ontario, Canada
- Burial place: Mount Pleasant Cemetery
- Military career
- Allegiance: Canada; United Kingdom
- Branch: Royal Flying Corps; Royal Canadian Air Force
- Service years: 1917–1919; 1941–1945
- Rank: Lieutenant
- Unit: No. 41 Squadron RAF
- Awards: Distinguished Flying Cross, Belgian Croix de Guerre
- Other work: Served in RCAF during World War II as a Flight Lieutenant.

Lieutenant Malcolm Plaw MacLeod (1897–1960) was a Canadian flying ace. He was credited with seven aerial victories scored during the closing days of World War I. He then returned to Canada to complete his education and work as a stockbroker until World War II, when he served in the Royal Canadian Air Force for the war's duration.

== Early life ==
Malcolm Plaw MacLeod was born in the province of Ontario, Canada, on 24 January 1897. Two differing sources place his birthplace as approximately 60 miles (95 km) northwest of Ottawa, Ontario. Both Arnprior and Renfrew are named as his native town.

MacLeod attended Kimberley Public School from 1905 until 1910; in 1911, he began study at the newly established University of Toronto Schools, matriculating there until 1917. On 13 August 1917, young MacLeod was commissioned a temporary second lieutenant on probation in the Royal Flying Corps.

== World War I ==
Just over a year after his appointment as an officer, on 17 August 1918, MacLeod joined No. 41 Squadron of the newly formed Royal Air Force as a Royal Aircraft Factory SE.5a pilot. On 30 August at 1730 hours, he scored his first aerial victory, driving a Fokker D.VII down out of control southwest of Armentières, France.

His next victory came at 0725 hours on 7 October 1918, when he drove down another Fokker D.VII south of Lille, France. On 30 October, he destroyed two German aircraft–a Halberstadt two-seater at 1145 hours northwest of Béclers, Belgium, and a Fokker D.VII at 1600 hours north of Roeselare.

On 4 November, he became both a balloon buster and an ace. He and William Ernest Shields cooperated in destroying an observation balloon at Pipaix, Belgium, before MacLeod destroyed another at Baugnies for his sixth victory. Five days later, MacLeod drove a Fokker D.VII down out of control over Renaix, Belgium, for his final win.

MacLeod was awarded both a Distinguished Flying Cross and the Belgian Croix de Guerre for his valour.

== Post World War I ==
MacLeod was transferred to the unemployed list of the Royal Air Force on 12 March 1919, effectively ending his term of military service. His DFC was gazetted on 3 June 1919. On 15 July 1919, his Belgian Croix de guerre was also gazetted.

MacLeod returned to Canada, taking up studies at the University of Toronto later in 1919. He finished up in 1921. Nothing is known of his next few years; however, he became a stockbroker in 1927 and followed that profession until his re-entry into service for World War II.

From 1937 through 1960, he was managing director of Saunders-Roe.

On 4 April 1941, he joined the Royal Canadian Air Force as a pilot officer. He served in various training commands of the RCAF within Canada until he was discharged on 20 September 1945. He rose to the rank of flight lieutenant during his service.

Malcolm Plaw MacLeod died at Sunnybrook Hospital in Toronto on 22 February 1960, and was buried at Mount Pleasant Cemetery.
