= Jagdstaffel 72 =

Fighter squadron of the air arm of the Imperial German Army

Jasta 72
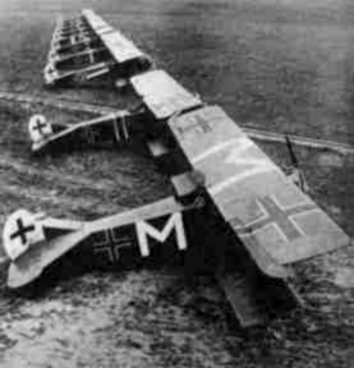
- The Fokker D.VIIs of Jagdstaffel 72 at Bergnicourt, France. Carl Menckhoff's in foreground.
- Active: 1918
- Country: Kingdom of Saxony, German Empire
- Branch: Luftstreitkräfte
- Type: Fighter squadron
- Engagements: World War I

Royal Saxon Jagdstaffel 72, commonly abbreviated to Jasta 72, was a "hunting group" (i.e., fighter squadron) of the Luftstreitkräfte, the air arm of the Imperial German Army during World War I. The squadron would score over 58 aerial victories during the war, including three observation balloons downed. The unit's victories came at the expense of two killed in action, one wounded in action, and one taken prisoner of war.

== History ==
Jasta 72 was founded on 11 February 1918, at Fliegerersatz-Abteilung ("Replacement Detachment") 8, Grossenhain. The new squadron became operational on 20 February 1918. On 2 March 1918, it was assigned to 3 Armee. On 28 March, it was moved to 18 Armee to become part of Jagdgruppe Nord. On 1 April 1918, Carl Menckhoff scored the squadron's first aerial victory. On 7 July 1918, Jasta 72 was posted to 1 Armee. The squadron continued to serve until the war's end.

== Commanding officers (Staffelführer) ==
- Carl Menckhoff: ca 11 February 1918 – 25 July 1918 (POW)
- Kurt Muller: ca 25 July 1918 – 23 October 1918
- Gustav Frädrich: 23 October 1918 – war's end

== Duty stations ==
- Blaize: 2 March 1918
- Leffincourt, France: 7 March 1918
- Bergnicourt, France: 7 July 1918
- Thin-le-Moutier, France: 10 October 1918
