= Hans Karl Müller =

German flying ace (1892–1977)

- Born: 9 July 1892; Loschwitz, Kingdom of Saxony
- Died: 23 July 1977 (aged 85); San Antonio, Texas, USA
- Military career
- Allegiance: German Empire
- Branch: Aviation
- Rank: Leutnant
- Units: Fliegerersatz-Abteilung 2; Kampfstaffel 11; Kampfeinsitzerkommando Avillers; Jagdstaffel 5
- Awards: Iron Cross First and Second Class
- Other work: Ran flying school in Mexico

Leutnant Hans Karl Müller was a pioneering German flying ace during World War I. He was credited with nine aerial victories. He also taught many others to fly, as an instructor in the German Air Service, and later, as a civilian instructor in Mexico.

== Early life ==
Hans Karl Müller was born on 19 July 1892 in Loschwitz, Germany, which was then in the Kingdom of Saxony. When World War I broke out, Müller joined the German Air Service, then known as the Die Fliegertruppen des deutschen Kaiserreiches.

== World War I ==
Müller became one of Germany's first military pilots when he undertook pilot's training at Fliegerersatz-Abteilung 2. He qualified as a pilot on 31 December 1914. Three days later, he was posted to FA 3. By 1 May 1915, he was stationed at Armee Flugpark 6. His next assignment was instructor duty at Grossenhain.

On 20 February 1916, Müller moved to the Verdun front and joinedKampfstaffel 11. He scored his first aerial victory while with them, on 26 March 1916. By the next month, he was flying a Fokker Eindekker. On 28 June 1916, he transferred to Kampfeinsitzerkommando Avillers. He scored two more victories while with this unit, destroying an enemy observation balloon and downing an enemy airplane over Verdun. He then became an original member of Jagdstaffel 5; he joined the squadron on 21 August 1916 as a Vizefeldwebel.

Over a four-month period, from 26 August through 26 December 1916, Müller scored six more aerial victories to become his squadron's leading ace. While scoring his ninth and final victory on 26 December, he was so severely wounded in the abdomen that he was removed from combat duty.

Müller was commissioned as a leutnant on 14 January 1917. Upon recovery, he served as a pilot for Siemens-Schuckert#Aircraft, the airplane manufacturer. He would never again see combat; he would survive the war, having been awarded both classes of the Iron Cross.

== List of aerial victories ==
No.	Date/time	Aircraft	Foe	Result	Location	Notes
1	26 March 1916		French aircraft		Callette Wood	
2	9 July 1916		Observation balloon		Verdun	
3	3 August 1916		Nieuport		Verdun	
4	26 August 1916		Either a Voisin or a Caudron		Verdun sector	
5	31 August 1916		Observation balloon		Maasbogen	
6	16 October 1916 @ 1750 hours		Caudron		South of Flers	
7	22 October 1916 @ 1200 hours		Airco D.H.2		Bapaume	
8	20 December 1916 @ 1630 hours		Caudron		South of Courcelles	
9	26 December 1916 @ 1355 hours		Royal Aircraft Factory B.E.2c		Le Sars	

== Post World War I ==
Müller emigrated to Mexico after war's end. He ran a flying school there until 1931. He then moved across the border to Texas. He died in San Antonio on 23 July 1977.
