= Balloon buster =

Military pilots known for destroying enemy observation balloons

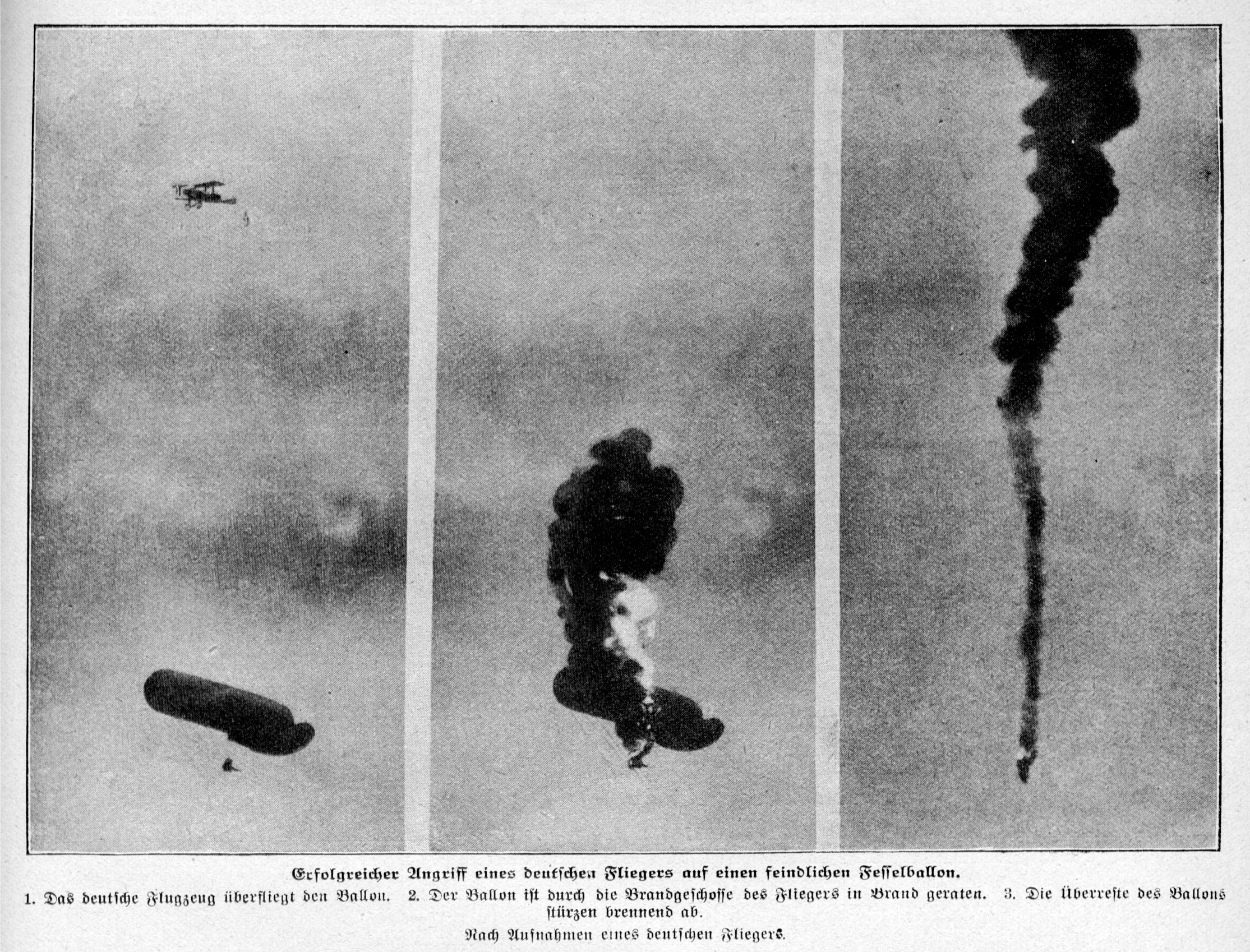
Observation balloon being shot down by a German biplane

Balloon busters were military pilots known for destroying enemy observation balloons. These pilots were noted for their fearlessness, as balloons were stationary targets able to receive heavy defenses, from the ground and the air. Seventy-seven flying aces in World War I were each credited with destroying five or more balloons, and thus were balloon aces.

== The crucial role of observation balloons ==
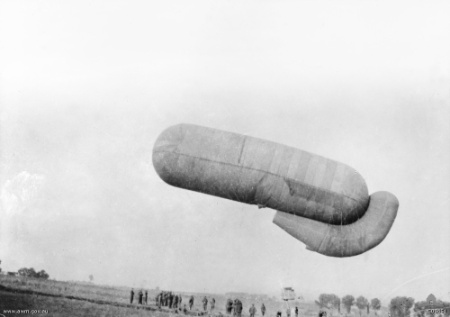
British balloon of the German Parseval-Siegsfeld type, 1916, typical of observation balloons in the first half of World War I

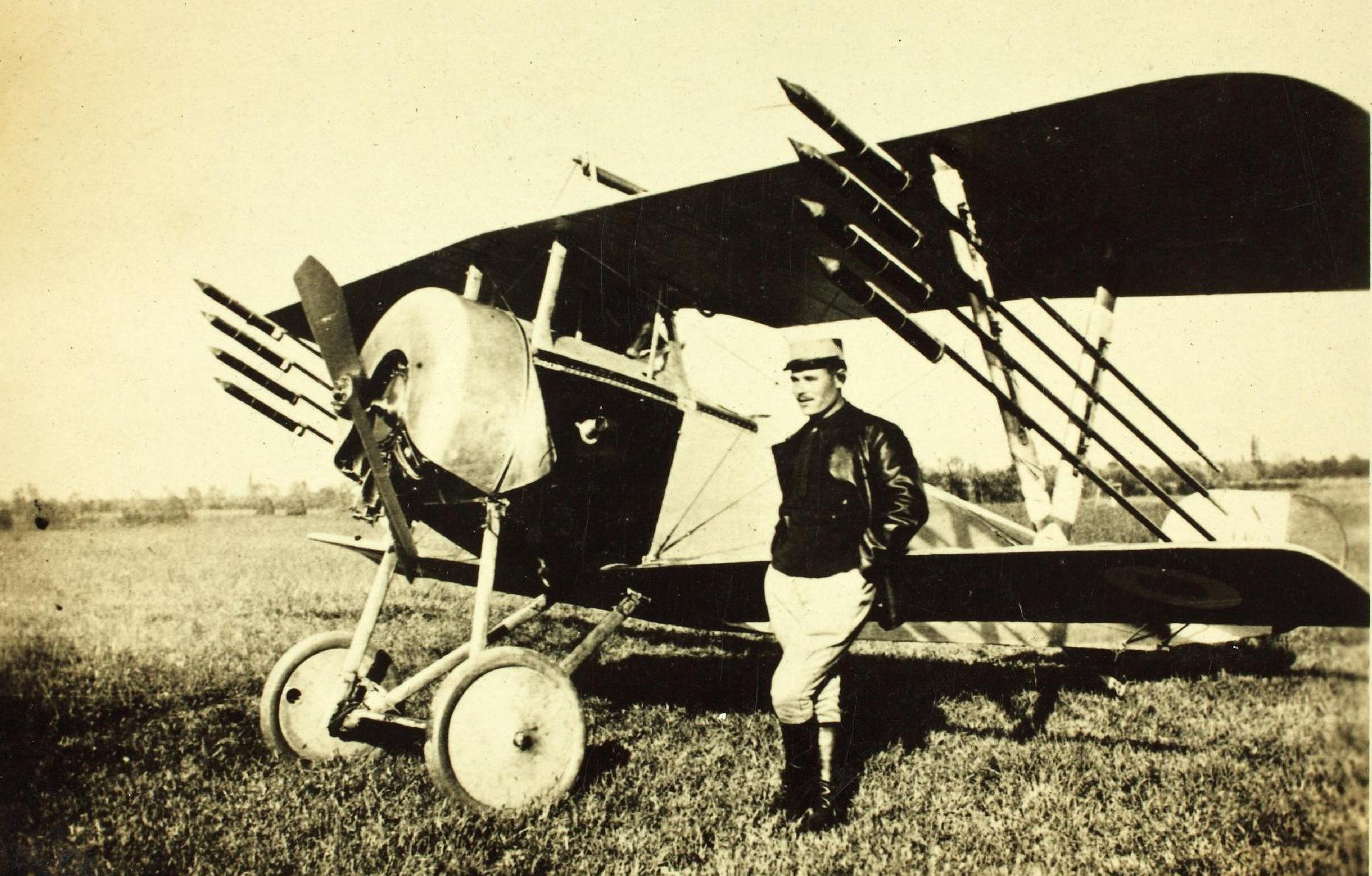
A Nieuport 11 armed with Le Prieur rockets and an overwing Lewis gun

An observation balloon was both a vulnerable and a valuable target: the balloon was moored in a stationary position and was lifted by flammable hydrogen gas, whose use was necessitated by the scarcity of helium reserves among European powers. The artillery observer, suspended in the wicker basket beneath, typically had a wireless transmitter, binoculars and/or a long-range camera. His job was to observe actions on the front-line and behind it, to spot enemy troop movements or unusual activity of any sort, and to call down artillery fire onto any worthwhile targets.

Balloon observers were consequently targets of great importance to both sides, especially before any sort of infantry action or offensive, so individual pilots, flights or whole squadrons were frequently ordered to attack balloons, to destroy them or at least disrupt their observation activities. Pilots on both sides tried to attack from a height that could enable them to fire without getting too close to the hydrogen and pull away fast. They were also cautioned not to go below 1,000 feet (300 m) in order to avoid machine gun and AA fire.

Due to their importance, balloons were usually given heavy defenses in the form of machine gun positions on the ground, anti-aircraft artillery, and standing fighter patrols stationed overhead. Other defenses included surrounding the main balloon with barrage balloons; stringing cables in the air in the vicinity of the balloons; equipping observers with machine guns; and flying balloons booby-trapped with explosives that could be remotely detonated from the ground. These measures made balloons very dangerous targets to approach.

Although balloons were occasionally shot down by small-arms fire, generally it was difficult to shoot down a balloon with solid bullets, particularly at the distances and altitude involved. Ordinary bullets would pass relatively harmlessly through the hydrogen gas bag, merely holing the fabric. Hits on the wicker car could however kill the observer.

One method employed was the solid-fuel Le Prieur rocket invented by Frenchman Lt. Yves Le Prieur and first used in April 1916. Rockets were attached to each outboard strut of a biplane fighter aircraft and fired through steel tubes using an electrical trigger. The rockets' inaccuracy was such that pilots had to fly very close to their target before firing.

It was not until special Pomeroy incendiary bullets and Buckingham flat-nosed incendiary bullets became available on the Western Front in 1917 that any consistent degree of success was achieved. Le Prieur rockets were withdrawn from service in 1918 once incendiary bullets had become available.

== Balloon busting aces ==
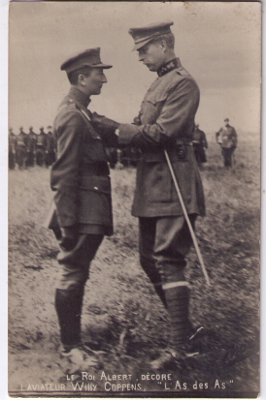
The leading balloon buster, Willy Coppens, is personally decorated by his monarch, King Albert I.

Name	Nationality	Balloon victories	Aircraft victories	Total	Reference
Willy Coppens	Belgian	35	2	37	
Léon Bourjade	French	27	1	28	
Michel Coiffard	French	24	10	34	
Maurice Boyau	French	21	14	35	
Friedrich Ritter von Röth	German	20	8	28	
Jacques Ehrlich	French	18	1	19	
Heinrich Gontermann	German	18	21	39	
Andrew Beauchamp-Proctor	South African	16	38	54	
Frank Luke	American	14	4	18	
Karl Schlegel	German	14	8	22	
Oskar Hennrich	German	13	7	20	
Marcel Haegelen	French	12	11	23	
Marius Ambrogi	French	11	3	14	
Friedrich Friedrichs	German	11	10	21	
Henry Woollett	British	11	24	35	
Tom F. Hazell	British	10	33	43	
Fritz Höhn	German	10	11	21	
Max Näther	German	10	16	26	
Erich Thomas	German	10	0	10	
William George Barker	Canadian	9	50	59	
Louis Bennett Jr.	American	9	3	12	
Théophile Henri Condemine	French	9	0	9	
Hans von Freden	German	9	11	20	
Sidney Highwood	British	9	7	16	
Erich Löwenhardt	German	9	45	54	
Jean Andre Pezon	French	9	1	10	
Armand Pinsard	French	9	18	27	
Erich Thomas	German	9	1	10	
Paul Barbreau	French	8	0	8	
Josef Jacobs	German	8	40	48	
Max Kuhn	German	8	4	12	
Charles J. V. Macé	French	8	4	12	
Ernest Maunoury	French	8	3	11	
Friedrich T. Noltenius	German	8	13	21	
Fritz Pütter	German	8	17	25	
Otto Schmidt	German	8	12	20	
Maurice Bizot	French	7	3	10	
Oskar Freiherr von Boenigk	German	7	19	26	
Julius Buckler	German	7	29	36	
Siegfried Büttner	German	7	6	13	
Harry King Goode	British	7	8	15	
Harold B. Hudson	Canadian	7	6	13	
Hans Nülle	German	7	4	11	
Charles Nungesser	French	7	36	43	
Hans Martin Pippart	German	7	15	22	
Paul Santelli	French	7	0	7	
Eugen Bönsch	Austro-Hungarian	6	10	16	
Hans Klein	German	6	16	22	
Antoine Laplasse	French	6	2	8	
Donald Roderick MacLaren	Canadian	6	48	54	
Georg Meyer	German	6	18	24	
Marcel Bloch	French	5	0	5	
Heinrich Bongartz	German	5	28	33	
Fernand Bonneton	French	5	4	9	
Godwin Brumowski	Austro-Hungarian	5	30	35	
William Charles Campbell	British	5	18	23	
Pierre Cardon	French	5	0	5	
Sydney Carlin	British	5	5	10	
Arthur Cobby	Australian	5	24	29	
Martin Dehmisch	German	5	5	10	
Pierre Ducornet	French	5	2	7	
Wilhelm Frickart	German	5	7	12	
Louis Prosper Gros	French	5	4	9	
Francis Guerrier	French	5	0	5	
Heinrich Haase	German	5	1	6	
Lansing Holden	American	5	2	7	
Adrien L. J. Leps	French	5	7	12	
Richard Burnard Munday	British	5	4	9	
Marcel Nogues	French	5	8	13	
Eddie Rickenbacker	American	5	21	26	
George R. Riley	British	5	8	13	
Gilbert Sardier	French	5	10	15	
William Ernest Shields	Canadian	5	19	24	
Walter Southey	South African	5	15	20	
Paul Y. R. Waddington	French	5	7	12	
Joseph Wehner	American	5	1	6	
Hans Weiss	German	5	11	16	

=== Aces with four balloon victories ===
Name	Origin	Balloon victories	Aircraft victories	Total
Heinrich Arntzen	German	4	7	11
Otto Brauneck	German	4	6	10
Harvey Weir Cook	American	4	3	7
Gustave Daladier	French	4	8	12
Benno Fiala Ritter von Fernbrugg	Austro-Hungarian	4 (Note: Includes the Italian airship M4.)	24	28
Elwyn King	Australian	4	22	26
Wilhelm Kühne	German	4	3	7
Georges Lachmann	French	4	5	9
Auguste Lahoulle	French	4	6	10
Edgar McCloughry	Australian	4	17	21
Paul Petit	French	4	3	7
Maurice Rousselle	French	4	1	5
Karl Schattauer	German	4	5	9
Leonard Taplin	Australian	4	8	12
Edgar Taylor	American	4	1	5
Guy Wareing	English	4	5	9

=== Aces with three balloon victories ===
Name	Origin	Balloon victories	Aircraft victories	Total
Giovanni Ancillotto	Italian	3	8	11
Yves F. Barbaza	French	3	2	5
Hans Böhning	German	3	14	17
Karl Bohny	German	3	5	8
Walter von Bülow-Bothkamp	German	3	25	28
Hamilton Coolidge	American	3	5	8
Pierre Delage	French	3	4	7
Rudolf von Eschwege	German	3	17	20
Henri Hay De Slade	French	3	16	19
Francis W. Gillet	American	3	17	20
Max Gossner	German	3	5	8
Justus Grassmann	German	3	7	10
Robert Hall	South African	3	2	5
Ludwig Hanstein	German	3	13	16
William Frederick James Harvey	English	3	23	26
Albert Haussmann	German	3	12	15
Heinrich Henkel	German	3	5	8
Adolf Heyrowsky	Austro-Hungarian	3	9	12
Camille Lagesse	Canadian	3	17	20
Friedrich Manschott	German	3	9	12
George McElroy	Irish	3	44	47
Maurice Newnham	English	3	15	18
John Steele Ralston	Scottish	3	9	12
Paul Rothe	German	3	2	5
Franz Rudorfer	German	3	8	11
Cecil Thompson	South African	3	3	6
Remington Vernam	American	3	3	6
Hans Waldhausen	German	3	3	6
Herbert Gilles Watson	New Zealander	3	11	14

=== Aces with two balloon victories ===
Name	Origin	Balloon victories	Aircraft victories	Total
Edgar O. Amm	South African	2	5	7
Maurice Arnoux	French	2	3	5
Horace Barton	South African	2	17	19
John Courade Bateman	English	2	5	7
Douglas John Bell	South African	2	17	19
Armond J. Berthelot	French	2	9	11
Billy Bishop	Canadian	2	70	72
Konrad Brendle	German	2	7	9
Jean Casale	French	2	11	13
William Gordon Claxton	Canadian	2	35	37
Edwin Cole	English	2	6	8
James Connelly	American	2	5	7
Charles Cudemore	English	2	13	15
Gilbert de Guingand	French	2	6	8
Armand de Turenne	French	2	13	15
Pierre Dufaur de Gavardie	French	2	4	6
Eduard Ritter von Dostler	German	2	24	26
Otto Fitzner	German	2	7	9
Willi Gabriel	German	2	9	11
Karl Gallwitz	German	2	8	10
George Gates	English	2	7	9
Frederick Stanley Gordon	New Zealander	2	7	9
Franz Gräser	Austro-Hungarian	2	16	18
Fernand Guyou	French	2	10	12
Erich Hahn	German	2	4	6
Georges Halberger	French	2	3	5
Lloyd Hamilton	American	2	8	10
Thomas Sinclair Harrison	South African	2	20	22
Robert Heibert	German	2	11	13
Albert Hets	German	2	4	6
Ernest Charles Hoy	Canadian	2	11	13
Frederick Hunt	English	2	7	9
Albert Leslie Jones	English	2	5	7
Erich Just	German	2	4	6
Arthur Korff	German	2	6	8
James Latta	English	2	3	5
Pierre Leroy de Boiseaumarie	French	2	3	5
Frederick Luff	American	2	3	5
John Mackereth	English	2	5	7
Malcolm Plaw MacLeod	Canadian	2	5	7
Rudolf Matthaei	German	2	8	10
Maurice Mealing	English	2	12	14
Zenos Miller	American	2	3	5
Hans Karl Müller	German	2	7	9
Edmund Nathanael	German	2	13	15
Otto Parschau	German	2	6	8
Andre Petit-Delchet	French	2	3	5
Croye Pithey	South African	2	8	10
Arthur Rahn	German	2	4	6
Hervey Rhodes	English	2	8	10
Cyril Ridley	English	2	9	11
Charles G. Ross	South African	2	18	20
Hugh Saunders	South African	2	13	15
Gustav Schneidewind	German	2	5	7
Wilhelm Schwartz	German	2	6	8
Kurt Schönfelder	German	2	11	13
Sumner Sewall	American	2	5	7
Langley Smith	Canadian	2	6	8
Werner Steinhauser	German	2	8	10
Francis S. Symondson	English	2	11	13
Mathieu Tenant de la Tour	French	2	7	9
Renatus Theiller	German	2	10	12
Bernhard Ultsch	German	2	10	12
Gilbert J. Uteau	French	2	3	5
Clive W. Warman	American	2	10	12
Paul Wenzl	German	2	8	10

== In literature ==
On the afternoon of September 14, 1918, while the Doughboys of the 33rd U.S. Infantry Division were stationed at Fromereville near Verdun, American war poet Lt. John Allan Wyeth was taking a shower with a group of bickering Doughboys when he heard the cry, "Air Raid!" Like every other bather, Wyeth ran, naked and covered with soap, into the village square. There, he watched as a Fokker D VII, flown by Unteroffizier Hans Heinrich Marwede from Jasta 67's aerodrome at Marville, attacked and set on fire three French observation balloons. Lieut. Wyeth later described Marwede's victory in his sonnet Fromereville: War in Heaven.

William Sanders' novel The Wild Blue and the Gray was set in a World War I squadron that flew several balloon-busting missions.

In Wilbur Smith's The Burning Shore the lead character carries out balloon-busting missions during World War I.

DC Comics published a character known as Steve Savage, the Balloon Buster in All-American Men of War title in 1965.

== See also ==
- Lists of World War I flying aces
- Incendiary balloon
- History of military ballooning
