= Gustav Frädrich =

- Born: 29 November 1892
- Military career
- Allegiance: Germany
- Branch: Aviation
- Rank: Leutnant
- Units: Flieger-Abteilung 30; Jagdstaffel 1; Jagdstaffel 39; Jagdstaffel 72
- Commands: Jagdstaffel 72
- Awards: Iron Cross

Leutnant Gustav Frädrich (born 29 November 1892, date of death unknown) was a German World War I flying ace credited with six aerial victories.

== Aerial service ==
Frädrich began his military aviation service for the German Empire when assigned to Flieger-Abteilung (Flier Detachment) 30 in Macedonia. He was credited with his first aerial victory on 16 May 1917, over Huxa, apparently flying a single-seater scout attached to the reconnaissance unit. Frädrich was transferred to Jagdstaffel 39 later in the year, this returning to the Western Front. In January 1918, he was transferred to Jagdstaffel 1 On 26 March 1918, he received his final transfer, to Jagdstaffel 72. He scored his second confirmed aerial victory with them, on 18 July 1918. His victories mounted; on 23 September 1918, he became an ace. On 23 October, he was appointed Staffelfuhrer, and would command Jasta 72 through war's end. He was known to have won the First Class Iron Cross for his service. He seems to have survived the war; however, there is no postwar information available on him. (Note: Note: German regulations called for award of the Second Class Iron Cross as a prerequisite for award of the First Class Iron Cross.)
