= Escadrille Spa.92 =

- Active: 1917–1918
- Country: France
- Branch: French Air Service
- Type: Fighter Squadron

Escadrille Spa.92 was a French fighter squadron active during the First World War from mid-1917 until the Armistice. Independent in operations until June 1918, they then became part of Groupe de Combat 22. By war's end, Escadrille Spa.92 was credited with destroying 11 enemy airplanes.

== History ==
Escadrille Spa.92 was organized as part of the French VII Armee on 2 May 1917. It was dubbed Escadrille N.92 because it was equipped with Nieuport fighters. By 27 July, it had been transferred to the II Armee area of operations.

On 14 May 1918, the squadron re-fitted with SPAD fighters and was renamed Escadrille Spa.92. In early June, it was one of four squadrons merged into Groupe de Combat 22. The escadrille would operate as part of the Groupe until war's end. By that time, Escadrille Spa.92 was credited with destroying 11 enemy airplanes, with eight other claims being probable victories.

== Commanding officers ==
- Lieutenant Edmond George: 2 May 1917 - 22 May 1917
- Capitaine Georges de Geyer d'Orth: 22 May 1917 - war's end

== Notable member ==
- Adjutant Maurice Robert

== Aircraft ==
- Nieuport fighters: 2 May 1917 - 14 May 1918
- SPAD fighters" 14 May 1918 - war's end
