= Jagdstaffel 67 =

Jasta 67
- Active: 1918
- Country: Kingdom of Prussia, German Empire
- Branch: Luftstreitkräfte
- Type: Fighter squadron
- Engagements: World War I

Royal Prussian Jagdstaffel 67, commonly abbreviated to Jasta 67, was a "hunting group" (i.e., fighter squadron) of the Luftstreitkräfte, forerunner to the Luftwaffe. The squadron would score over 34 aerial victories during the war, including 17 observation balloons downed. The unit's victories came at the expense of one pilot killed in action, one wounded in action, and two taken prisoner of war.

== History ==
On 27 January 1918, Jasta 67 was founded at Fliegerersatz-Abteilung ("Replacement Detachment") 9, Darmstadt. It became operational on 5 February 1918. It was assigned to 5 Armee a week later. The new squadron scored its first aerial victory on 13 March 1918.

== Commanding officer (Staffelführer) ==
- Julius Fichter

== Duty stations ==
- Marville: 12 February 1918
