= Kurt Grasshoff =

Kurt Grasshoff (January 24, 1891 – June 12, 1918) was a German pilot who commanded Jasta 37 in France and Jasta 38 in Macedonia in World War I. He commanded German ace Ernst Udet in Jasta 37, and chose Udet to command the unit upon his transfer to Jasta 38.

== Early life ==
Grasshoff was born in Randau, the only child of Prussian Oberleutnant Karl Grasshoff and his wife Clara. At age 11 he entered cadet school in Potsdam. His father, who had become seriously ill, died aged 44 in 1904. Grasshoff continued a military career and entered cadet leaders’ school at Lichterfelde.

On 16 November 1910 Grasshoff was promoted at age 19 to Leutnant in a Mecklenburg battalion. He was a good rifleman, winning a sabre and a silver cup. After World War I began Grasshoff was sent to the Western Front as a member of a bicycle company with his battalion. However, an accident of some kind made him unsuitable for the infantry.

== Joining the War in the Air ==
As a result of his injury, Grasshoff transferred to pilot training school at Johannisthal. Although the historical record is unclear, it appears that Grasshoff originally trained to pilot two-seat observation aircraft, and by November 1916 as an Oberleutnant he was assigned to Jasta 15 as a single-seater pilot, based at Habsheim. During his service with Jasta 15, Grasshoff developed a close friendship fellow pilot Ernst Udet.

Oberleutnant Grasshoff reported to Armee Flug Park B on 1 March 1917 and was assigned as Commanding Officer of new fighter unit Jasta 37, based at Möntingen, on 10 March 1917. Over the next months, Oberleutnant Grasshoff’s friend Udet became weary of his service in Jasta 15, then located at La Selve. According to Udet’s biography, translated into English under the title Ace of the Iron Cross, on 4 June 1917: “I write to Grasshoff, an old friend from the days at Habsheim -- ‘I want to go to another front, I would like to come to you. I’m the last of Jasta 15, the last of those once left from Mülhausen to go to Champagne.”

The transfer was arranged and Udet began his service with Jasta 37 on 19 June 1917.

Udet’s biography by van Ishoven adds additional insights about Oberleutnant Grasshoff. After Udet outfits an abandoned house with a large bed, Grasshoff reportedly commented, “With a landing area of such size, you can set yourself down as you wish, whichever way the wind is blowing.” Another Jasta 37 pilot noted that he and Udet often played “tag” in the air. Grasshoff, who watched these exercises from his canvas chair on the edge of the airfield, soon advised, however, that “No more of my men are going to do this kind of thing!” Van Ishoven’s biography also suggests that Oberleutnant Grasshoff, who did not claim any enemy aircraft kills, sought transfer to Macedonia where he believed it might be easier to have success in the air.

Udet succeeded Oberleutnant Grasshoff as commander of Jasta 37 when Grasshoff became commander of Jasta 38, and made several other references to his friend: “Many were surprised at Grasshoff leaving me in command when he was transferred to Macedonia. There are men here senior both in years and rank. But, back in the fall, when I brought down the three Englishmen over Lens, he had promised it to me. It was a surprise success in Guynemer’s style. I came down out of the sun and attacked the last one on the outside left, finishing him with five rounds. Then the next one and, finally, the leader. The other two were so surprised, they didn’t get a shot off. The whole thing didn’t last more than twenty seconds, just as it was with Guynemer back then. In war, one must learn the trade of fighter piloting or get knocked off. There is no alternative. When I land, Grasshoff knew all about it. ‘When I leave here some day, Knaegges, you will inherit the staffel,’ he said. Thus I became the C.O. of Jasta 37.”

== Transfer and last battle ==
Oberleutnant Grasshoff became commanding officer of Jasta 38 in Macedonia on 17 November 1917. The historical record of Jasta 38 is incomplete, but Grasshoff’s desire for personally claiming air kills was never fulfilled. On 12 June 1918 Grasshoff was returning from a reconnaissance flight when attacked by British aircraft. Grasshoff was shot in the abdomen but was able to land his damaged aircraft. However he died several hours later and was buried at a cemetery near the Vardar River.

Historical records indicate that Lieutenant Douglas Arthur Davies of No 150 Squadron RAF shot down Grasshoff. Grasshoff is believed to have been flying the second enemy aircraft reported in Davies’ account of an air battle early that day:

"Whilst flying Sopwith Camel C/1599 and after having returned with Bombers to our lines I moved towards SMOKVICA at a height of about 12,000 ft, when I saw 7 or 8 E.A. D.V’s some 5,000 ft or 6,000 ft below. I dived vertically and engaged the nearest. After firing a short burst flame and smoke enveloped the machine. At this point a second E.A. DV appeared which I engaged and after sitting on his tail for some time and firing the E.A. became out of control and I saw it side-slip violently and crash beneath two trees, whereupon a great deal of smoke rose from the crash. By this time I was about 1,000 ft and my engine oiled up and one gun badly jammed. An S.E.5a escorted me back to our lines which I reached with difficulty. Note: I saw a 3rd E.A. fall and crash badly.” This report also indicates that this combat occurred about 12 miles north of “Guevgueli” between 6:55 a.m. and 8 a.m."

No other Jasta 38 pilots are reported to have died in combat on this date, despite Davies’ report of another enemy aircraft engulfed in flames and another crashing.

During his military career, Oberleutnant Grasshoff received the Iron Cross First and Second Class, the Bulgarian "Courage Medal", and the Mecklenburg Merit Cross, 1st and 2nd class.
