= Gustave Daladier =

WW1 French flying ace

Gustave Victorin Daladier
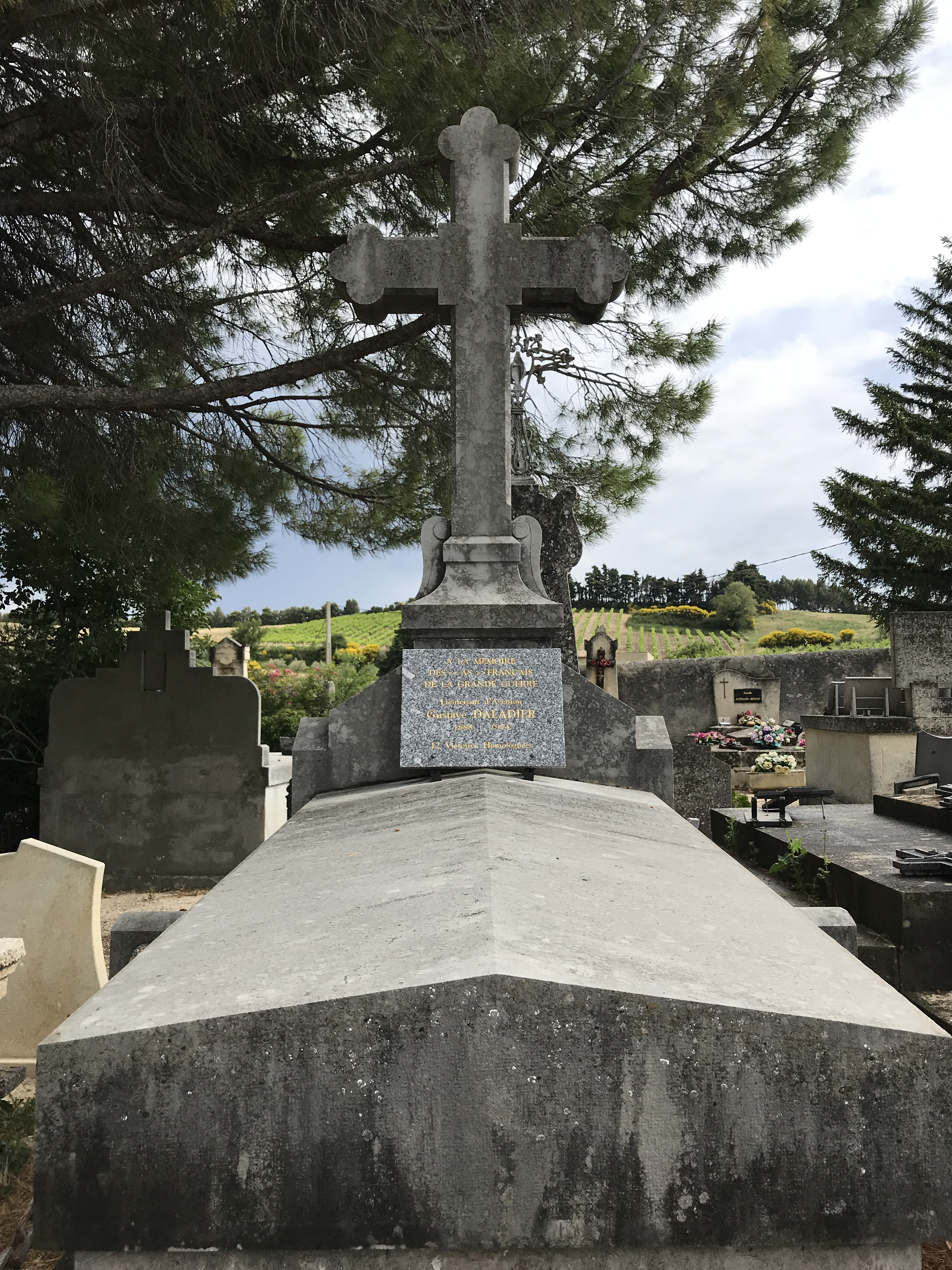
- Gustave Daladier's tomb in Villedieu
- Born: 23 March 1888; Villedieu, France
- Died: 16 April 1974 (aged 86)
- Military career
- Allegiance: France
- Branch: Aviation
- Service years: 1907 – ca 1929
- Rank: Capitaine
- Units: Escadrille 73; Escadrille 14; Escadrille 93
- Awards: Légion d'honneur Médaille militaire Croix de Guerre; Order of Ouissam Alaouite; Nichan Iftikar
- Other work: Continued military career

Capitaine Gustave Victorin Daladier was a French World War I flying ace credited with twelve aerial victories. He would continue in his nation's military service after World War I.

== Early life ==
Gustave Victorin Daladier was born on 23 March 1888 in Villedieu, France.

== Early military service ==
Daladier volunteered for a three-year enlistment on 3 December 1907. He began his military career in the 4eme Regiment de Chasseurs d'Afrique as an enlisted soldier. On 5 June 1909, he was promoted to Brigadier. He transferred to the 4eme Regiment de Spahis on 22 October 1909. On 6 January 1914, he was promoted to Maréchal-des-logis. On 23 March 1915, he was again promoted, to Maréchal des logis-chef. He then transferred to aviation.

== Aviation service in World War I ==
On 22 September 1915, Daladier reported to 1er Groupe d'Aviation at Dijon for pilot's training. He underwent advance training at Buc. On 20 January 1916, he received Military Pilot's Brevet No. 2289. On 28 April, he was assigned to Escadrille 73. On 16 July 1916, he was reassigned to Escadrille F14 (the 'F' denoting the use of Farman aircraft). Daladier was then promoted to Adjutant on 25 October 1916.

On 4 May 1917, he was awarded the Médaille militaire; two days later, he was assigned to Escadrille N93 to fly a Nieuport. Between 14 April and 30 October 1917, he scored four victories, with one each being shared with Maurice Robert and Fernand Guyou. On 5 November 1917, Daladier was promoted to Adjutant-Chef.

He then upgraded to a Spad. His last eight victories, between 29 May and 4 October 1918 were split equally between balloon busting German observation balloons and destroying enemy airplanes. He did share one of his last four victories over airplanes with Pierre Delage. He also was finally commissioned sous lieutenant on 17 June 1918. Shortly after that, on 27 July 1918, he was awarded the Chevalier de la Légion d'honneur.

== Post World War I ==
Daladier remained in French military aviation after the war, rising to capitaine in 1929. He was "promoted" within the Légion d'honneur, becoming an Officier in July 1926 and Commandeur in 1949. By the end of his career, in addition to the Légion d'honneur and Médaille militaire, he had been awarded the Croix de Guerre with nine palmes, the Chevalier du Order of Ouissam Alaouite, and the Officier du Nichan Iftikar.

Gustave Victorin Daladier died on 16 April 1974.

== Honors and awards ==
Médaille militaire

"Excellent non-commissioned officer having already given proof of high qualities in Algeria and Morocco. Transferred to aviation he has shown himself to be a pilot of utmost bravery. Has executed numerous reconnaissances of long distances and has had several combats. On 14 April 1917, he downed an enemy plane under particularly difficult circumstances

Chevalier de la Légion d'honneur

"Admirable pilot because of his spirit and initiative in combat. During two and a half years in aviation he has always given proof of his ability through numerous protection and pursuit missions entrusted to him with very heroic spirit and devotion. He recently brought the number of his victories to seven. Médaille militaire for feats of war. Four citations."

- Chevalier du Order of Ouissam Alaouite
- Officier du Nichan Iftikar
