= Erich Thomas =

German flying ace (1897–1960)

- Born: 10 February 1897; Essen, Germany
- Died: 18 November 1960 (aged 63); Münster, Germany
- Military career
- Allegiance: Germany
- Branch: Imperial German Air Service
- Rank: Leutnant
- Units: Jagdstaffel 9, Jagdstaffel 22
- Awards: Iron Cross First and Second Class

Leutnant Erich Thomas was a World War I German flying ace credited with ten aerial victories. Nine of these were observation balloons he destroyed.

== Balloon buster ==
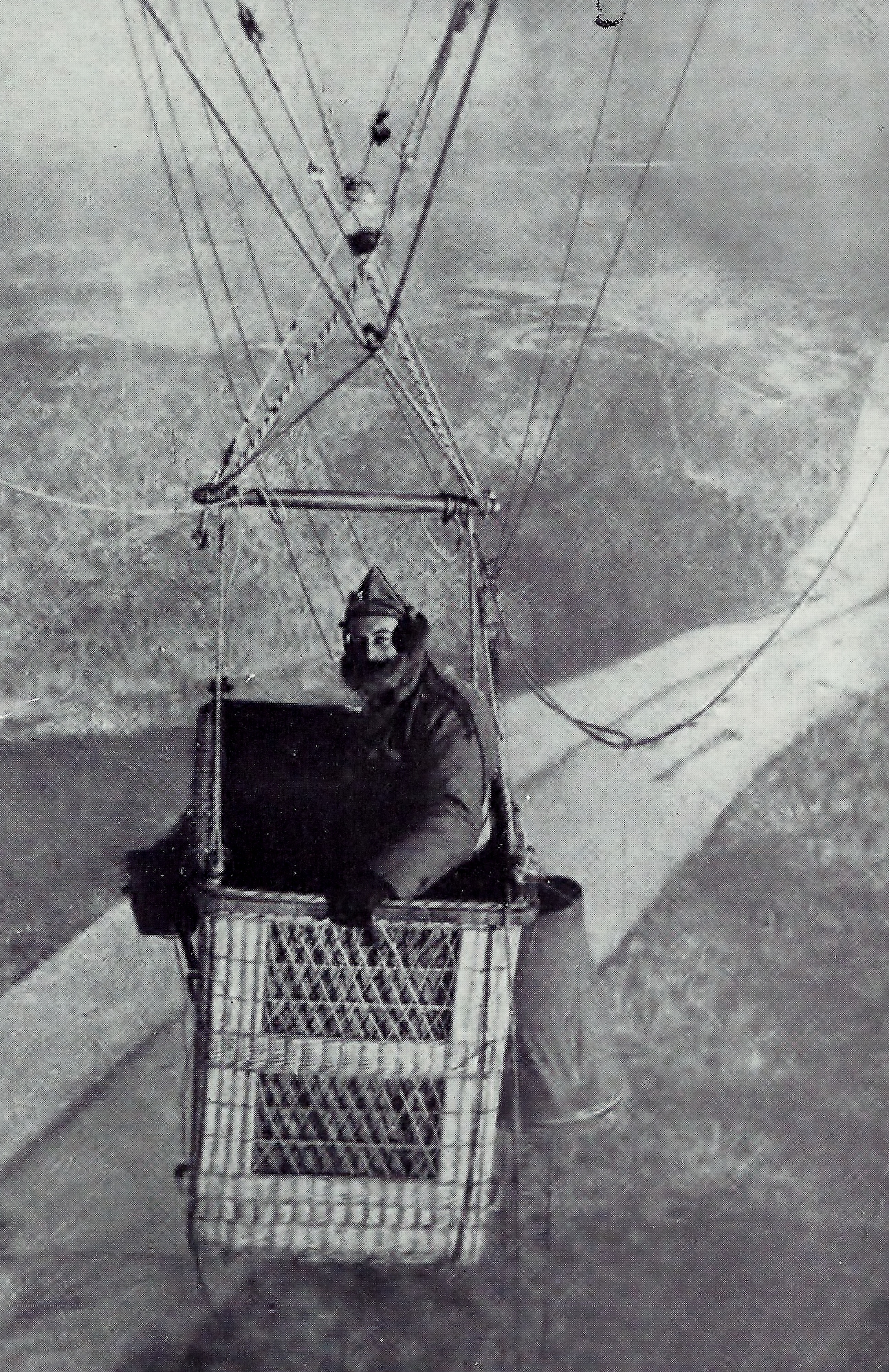
Aerial observer in balloon gondola, 1918.

Thomas was assigned to Jagdstaffel 9 in December 1917. He shot down his first enemy observation balloon on 3 January 1918. He carried on his career as a balloon buster for Jasta 9 through 16 March 1918, when he downed numbers seven and eight. He then transferred to Jagdstaffel 22, and shot down a ninth balloon on 21 March, and a Sopwith on the 22nd. On 23 March, he attacked another French balloon and was shot down by Jean Chaput, Marcel Haegelen, and Auguste Lahoulle. Thomas was taken prisoner of war.
