= Léon Bourjade =

World War I flying ace

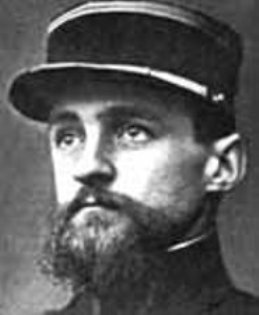
- Born: May 25, 1889; Montauban, France
- Died: October 22, 1924 (aged 35); Yule Island, Papua New Guinea
- Military career
- Allegiance: France
- Branch: Artillery, flying service
- Service years: 1914–1918
- Rank: Lieutenant
- Unit: Escadrille 152
- Awards: Legion of Honour, Croix de Guerre
- Other work: Priest and medical missionary

Léon Bourjade (25 May 1889 – 22 October 1924), born Jean-Pierre Léon Bourjade, was a leading French fighter pilot in World War I, notable for being his country's leading balloon-busting ace. He interrupted his theological studies to fight in World War I; post-war, he completed his studies and spent the few remaining years of his life as a missionary in what is now Papua New Guinea.

== Early life and service ==
Bourjade was born at Montauban, France on 25 May 1889. It was his childhood dream to become a missionary priest. His studies to that end were interrupted by his compulsory military service for France. Upon his release from service, he resumed his studies, but in Switzerland.

In 1914 he returned to France to enter the army. He served as an enlisted artilleryman for nearly three years. His initial service was with 23eme Regiment d'Artillerie for the First Battle of the Marne. In 1915, he transferred to the 125^{e} Brigade de Bombardiers, a mortar brigade. While serving with this unit, he was commissioned into officers' ranks as a Sous lieutenant.

== Aviation service ==
He transferred to aviation in 1917, receiving his Military Pilot's Brevet on 17 June. He went on to advanced training at Pau. From there, he joined Escadrille N152; he was eventually to become its highest-scoring pilot. Originally, he flew a Nieuport with his own personal touch - a Sacré-Coeur banner streaming from his headrest.

He opened his list on 27 March 1918, after his squadron re-equipped, flying his newly acquired Spad XIII to shoot down a German observation balloon. With one exception, all of his air victories were to be over balloons.

Bourjade scored another victory in April and two in May. He then went off combat duty for three weeks to attend gunnery school. After his return, he became an ace on 25 June with the first of his four scores for the month. His seventh, on 29 June 1918, was over a Fokker D VII, his only victory not involving a balloon.

In the remaining four months of his career, his victories totaled seven in July, one in August, four in September, and eight in October. Beginning in August 1918, he made it a practice to coordinate his attack on the balloons with other French pilots. August was the month he spent largely out of action, with three weeks in the hospital and eight days leave spent with his parents.

He ended the war with a victory list of 27 balloons and one aircraft shot down, with a second airplane as an unconfirmed victory. It was a total that left him second only to Willy Coppens of Belgium as a balloon buster.

He was awarded a Chevalier of the Legion d'Honneur. In 1920, he was raised to Officier in the Legion.

== Post war ==
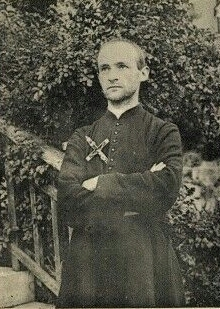
Bourjade after his ordination.

On 26 July 1921 he was finally ordained as a priest, taking ship to New Guinea that November to join the Catholic Sacred Heart Mission on Yule Island, in what was then the Australian Territory of Papua (British New Guinea). Bourjade died in 1924, of hematuria (perhaps the result of an overdose of quinine against malaria). He was 35 years old.

French warships visiting Yule Island would fire salutes in his honour.

== Citations for Decorations ==
Légion d'Honneur (Chevalier)

"Officer pilot of uncommon bravery and audacity. After brilliant conduct in the artillery, he has proven the highest qualities of courage by attacking numerous balloons and has shot down four. Four citations." Chevalier de la Légion d'Honneur citation, June 5, 1918

Légion d'Honneur (Officier)

"Officer of the highest value; pursuit pilot of heroic bravery. .... Fourteen citations. One wound." Officier de la Légion d'Honneur citation, June 16, 1920.
