= Heinrich Arntzen =

German WW1 fighter ace

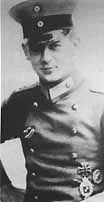
- Heinrich Arntzen, photographed between 1916 and 1918
- Born: 11 September 1894; Anholt, Germany
- Died: Unknown
- Military career
- Allegiance: Germany
- Branch: Aviation
- Rank: Leutnant
- Units: Feldflieger Abteilung 34 (Field Flier Detachment 34); Feldflieger Abteilung 2 (Field Flier Detachment 2); Jagdstaffel 15 (Fighter Squadron 15)
- Commands: Jagdstaffel 50 (Fighter Squadron 50)
- Awards: Royal House Order of Hohenzollern, Iron Cross First and Second Class

Leutnant Heinrich Arntzen (11 September 1894 - ?) was a German World War I flying ace credited with eleven aerial victories.

== Early life ==
Heinrich Arntzen was born on 11 September 1894 in Anholt, Germany.

== World War I service ==
Arntzen flew as an observer with two artillery cooperation units during 1916, Feldflieger Abteilung 34 (Field Flier Detachment 34) and Feldflieger Abteilung 2 (Field Flier Detachment 2). He scored four victories with the latter unit in 1916, though details are mostly unknown. He then underwent pilot training and was assigned to Jagdstaffel 15 (Fighter Squadron 15) as both pilot and technical officer. On 13 August 1917, he shot down a Caudron to become an ace. On 15 October 1917, he shot down a French observation balloon. On 13 January 1918, he was promoted to command of Jagdstaffel 50 (Fighter Squadron 50). Between 25 January and 4 April 1918, he destroyed three more French balloons, a British RE.8, and a French Breguet 14, to bring his total to four enemy balloons and seven opposing airplanes. On 27 May 1918, his career as a balloon buster ended with his being wounded by anti-aircraft fire while attacking one. By that time, he had been awarded both the Second and First Class Iron Cross, as well as the Royal House Order of Hohenzollern.
