= Maurice Robert (aviator) =

Maurice Joseph Emile Robert
- Born: 19 January 1893; Maubeuge, France
- Died: 19 July 1918 (aged 25)
- Military career
- Allegiance: France
- Branch: Aviation
- Rank: Adjutant
- Units: Escadrille C.61; Escadrille DO.22; Escadrille N.92
- Awards: Médaille militaire Croix de Guerre

Adjutant Maurice Joseph Emile Robert was a French World War I flying ace credited with five aerial victories.

== Biography ==
Maurice Joseph Emile Robert was born in Maubeuge, France on 19 January 1893.

Robert began his military service on 7 April 1913 as an artilleryman. On 16 August 1914, as World War I roared into being, Robert was transferred to aviation duty, being posted to Escadrille DO.22, a Dorand DO.1 squadron.

In May 1915, he was sent for pilot's training. On 26 December 1915, he was granted Military Pilot's Brevet. He would spend more than a year in advanced instruction before being posted to Escadrille C.61 as a Caudron pilot on 3 February 1916. He was shifted to a Nieuport fighter squadron, Escadrille N.92, on 3 May 1917. On the 24th of that month, he shot down a Fokker Eindekker in a victory shared by Gustave Daladier. He shot down two more later in 1917, and was awarded the Médaille Militaire after his third victory.

On 29 January 1918, he was promoted to Adjutant. He shot down two more German airplanes that year, with his fifth victory on 30 June making him an ace. He was killed in action on 19 July 1918.

== Honors and awards ==
Médaille Militaire: "Pilot of Escadrille N92, non-commissioned officer remarkable for his bravery and sangfroid. Has had several combats where he has never ceased to assert his superiority. Attacked by an enemy aircraft on 14 July 1917, during the course of a protection mission, he courageously confronted it in battle and reported his third victory. Already wounded and cited in orders two times."

Croix de guerre with four palms
