= Pierre Cardon =

Pierre Marie Joseph Cardon
- Born: October 30, 1894; Armentières, France
- Died: December 4, 1987 (aged 93)
- Military career
- Allegiance: France
- Branch: Flying service
- Rank: Marchel-des-Logis (Cavalry sergeant major)
- Unit: C64, Spa81
- Conflicts: World War I
- Awards: Médaille militaire, Croix de Guerre

Maréchal-des-logis Pierre Marie Joseph Cardon (30 October 1894 – 4 December 1987) was a French World War I balloon buster credited with five aerial victories over enemy observation balloons.

== Biography ==
Pierre Marie Joseph Cardon was born 30 October 1894 in Armentières, France. He joined the French army on 29 August 1914, in the early days of World War I. He was transferred to aviation duty as a mechanic on 3 April 1916. In January 1917, he was sent to pilot's training. Upon completion, he was retained as an instructor until October, when he was forwarded for advanced training in single-seat airplanes. On 15 December 1917, he would be posted to Escadrille 81. During May and June 1918, in consort with other French pilots, he would undergo the extreme hazards of balloon busting five enemy observation balloons.

He is known to have won the Médaille Militaire and the Croix de Guerre.

== Bibliography ==
- Franks, Norman; Bailey, Frank (1993). Over the Front: The Complete Record of the Fighter Aces and Units of the United States and French Air Services, 1914–1918. London, UK: Grub Street Publishing.
- Méchin, David (November 2013). "Pierre Cardon, as de 1914–1918: Cinq victoires aux commandes d'un Spad". Le Fana de l'Aviation. No. 528. pp. 56–62.
