= Heinrich Henkel =

- Born: 11 May 1896; Hamburg, German Empire
- Died: Unknown
- Military career
- Allegiance: Germany
- Branch: Aviation
- Rank: Leutnant
- Unit: Jasta 37
- Awards: Iron Cross

Leutnant Heinrich Henkel (born 11 May 1896, date of death unknown) was a World War I flying ace credited with eight aerial victories.

== Biography ==
Heinrich Henkel was born in Hamburg, the German Empire on 11 May 1896.

On 1 September 1914, Henkel volunteered for military service in Reserve Fusilier Artillery Regiment Nr. 3. He went into battle with them at Nancy, France, at Antwerp, and at Ypres. On 1 July 1915, he was transferred to the infantry. He was wounded in action on 25 September 1916. He was subsequently promoted to the officer's ranks as a Leutnant in December 1916. He volunteered for aviation duty and began training at Fliegerersatz-Abteilung (Replacement Detachment) 1 in February 1917.

Henkel would also undergo fighter pilot's training at Valenciennes, France before joining Jagdstaffel 37 in May 1918. He scored his first aerial victory on 9 July, and had scored seven more by 31 October 1918. Three of his eight victories were shot-down observation balloons, making him a "balloon buster". Heinrich Henkel survived the war, having won the Iron Cross for his gallantry, but faded into obscurity.
