= William Charles Campbell =

British flying ace and businessman (1889–1958)

- Born: 27 April 1889; Bordeaux, France
- Died: 26 February 1958 (aged 68)
- Military career
- Allegiance: United Kingdom
- Branch: British Army
- Service years: 1916–1918
- Rank: Captain
- Nickname: Carlo
- Unit: No. 1 Squadron RFC
- Awards: Distinguished Service Order; Military Cross & Bar

Captain William Charles Campbell, DSO, MC* (27 April 1889 – 26 February 1958), was a World War I fighter pilot of Scots heritage who was credited with 23 victories. Serving with No. 1 Squadron during 1917, he was a notable balloon buster, being the first British ace to down five enemy observation balloons. He also claimed eleven aircraft destroyed, and seven (including two shared) 'driven down out of control'.

== Biography ==
Campbell was born in Bordeaux, France, where his father, originally from Aberdeen, was Lloyds' representative, while his mother was from a titled French family. His brother, Eugène, joined the French Army and was gassed at Verdun. Campbell worked in the wholesale food industry before joining the Royal Flying Corps in 1916. He was trained at Croydon, and was awarded the Royal Aero Club Aviator's Certificate No. 3806 on 1 November 1916 at the Ruislip military school, flying a Maurice Farman biplane.

He was posted to France in March 1917, and assigned to No. 1 Squadron as a Nieuport Scout pilot on 1 May 1917. In the space of two and half months, between 14 May and 28 July 1917, Campbell gained 23 aerial victories, including five observation balloons, becoming the RFC's first "balloon buster ace", and on 16 July shot down three Albatros DV's in the space of half an hour. On 31 July, Campbell became German ace Eduard Ritter von Dostler's 21st claim; Campbell was wounded in the thigh and his bullet-riddled aircraft was driven down. He returned to England, and on 18 September 1917 was appointed Chief Instructor at the School of Military Aeronautics, with the rank of acting-major.

Post-war Campbell resumed his business career in the food industry, eventually becoming the chairman of Plaistowe & Co., Sarson's Ltd., and British Vinegars Ltd., and deputy-chairman of Crosse & Blackwell Holdings. A keen sportsman and promoter, he was a major shareholder in the White City Stadium in west London, and became Chairman of Brighton & Hove Albion Football Club.

== Military honours ==
Campbell was awarded the Military Cross, and received second award soon after; details of both were published in the same edition of the London Gazette on 16 August 1917. In September he was awarded the Distinguished Service Order. On 7 November he received a mention in despatches from Field-Marshal Sir Douglas Haig, for the "distinguished and gallant services and devotion to duty he considers deserving of special mention." He received another mention "in respect of the valuable services ... rendered in connection with the war" on 22 January 1919.

Military Cross

2nd Lt. William Charles Campbell, R.F.C., Spec. Res.

For conspicuous gallantry and devotion to duty. He attacked an enemy balloon, bringing it down in flames, and returned to our lines at about twenty feet from the ground under heavy fire. On another occasion he attacked and dispersed a column of infantry from a very low altitude. He has shown great courage and initiative throughout.

Bar to Military Cross

2nd Lt. William Charles Campbell, M.C., R.F.C., Spec. Res.

For conspicuous gallantry and devotion to duty. He has repeatedly shown great fearlessness and skill in attacking and destroying enemy aircraft, on one occasion destroying three within one hour. He has also attacked and dispersed enemy troops from a low altitude, at all times showing the utmost disregard of personal safety.

Distinguished Service Order

2nd Lt. (T./Capt.) William Charles Campbell, M.C., R.F.C., Spec. Res.

For conspicuous gallantry and devotion to duty on numerous occasions whilst on offensive patrols. He has displayed the greatest courage and skill in attacking enemy aircraft at close range, destroying some and driving others down out of control. He has proved himself to be a scout leader of the highest class, and has destroyed twelve hostile machines and two balloons, besides taking part in many other combats during the last three months. By his fearlessness and offensive spirit he has. set a splendid example to all ranks.
