= Karl Bohnenkamp =

World War I flying ace

- Born: 10 January 1890; Dortmund-Aplerbeck
- Died: 27 February 1930 (aged 40)
- Burial place: Waldfriedhof Duisburg
- Military career
- Allegiance: Germany
- Branch: Aviation
- Rank: Vizefeldwebel
- Units: Feldflieger Abteilung 39; Feldflieger Abteilung 208; Royal Saxon Jagdstaffel 22
- Awards: Military Merit Cross

Vizefeldwebel Karl Bohnenkamp was a World War I flying ace credited with 15 aerial victories. He scored his first victory on 21 September 1917 and continued through 28 October 1918. His 15 victories made him the leading ace in his squadron. He was awarded the Military Merit Cross on the latter date.

== Military career ==
Before Bohnenkamp qualified as a pilot, he was a radio operator for Feldflieger Abteilung (Field Flier Detachment) 39 from May 1915 to August 1916. After undergoing pilot's training, he was assigned to Feldflieger Abteilung 208 in February 1917. On 25 July 1917, he was "promoted" to flying fighter aircraft for Royal Saxon Jagdstaffel 22. His first aerial success came on 21 September 1917. He would continue to score victories almost until war's end, his last one coming on 28 October 1918. The latter date, he was presented with the Golden Military Merit Cross–the highest military decoration that could be awarded to a German noncommissioned officer.
