= Eric John Stephens =

- Born: 13 September 1895; Bendigo, Victoria, Australia
- Died: 25 January 1967 (aged 71); Lae, Papua, New Guinea
- Military career
- Allegiance: Australia
- Branch: Aviation
- Rank: Captain
- Unit: No. 41 Squadron RAF
- Awards: Distinguished Flying Cross

Captain Eric John Stephens (13 September 1895 – 25 January 1967) was an Australian flying ace who served in the Royal Air Force. He was credited with 13 confirmed aerial victories. He later became a Qantas pilot.

== Early life ==
Eric John Stephens was born in Bendigo, Victoria, Australia on 13 September 1895. When Eric John Stephens joined the Australian Imperial Force on 19 July 1915, he named his father, John Thomas Stephens, as next of kin. The younger Stephens was a college student and was in the militia when he joined.

He landed at Marseille, France in June 1916. He served on both the Northern Front and the Somme River, being commissioned a Second Lieutenant in the process.

== Flying service ==
Stephens' was commissioned in the RFC on 13 April 1917. He became a pilot on 30 June. He was retained as a flying instructor until his transfer to No. 41 Squadron RFC on 16 March 1918. Using a Royal Aircraft Factory SE.5a, he shot down a Rumpler on 28 June for his first victory; he shared it with Frederick McCall. Stephens would accumulate 12 more wins after this, all solo, and most over enemy fighters, with the final one falling on 1 November 1918. By war's end, he was a Flight Commander, had destroyed five enemy airplanes, and driven down eight more out of control.

== Aerial victory list ==
No.	Date/time	Foe	Result	Location	Notes
1	28 June 1918 @ 1050 hours	Rumpler reconnaissance craft	Destroyed	Belloy-en-Santerre	Victory shared with Frederick McCall
2	30 June 1918 @ 0815 hours	Pfalz D.III fighter	Driven down out of control	Bray-Peronne	
3	3 July 1918 @ 1915 hours	Pfalz D.III	Driven down out of control	East of Lamotte	
4	29 August 1918 @ 0850 hours	Fokker D.VII fighter	Driven down out of control	South of Armentieres	
5	29 August 1918 @ 0930 hours	Fokker D.VII	Destroyed	East of Comines	
6	3 September 1918 @ 1845 hours	Fokker D.VII	Driven down out of control	South of Vitry	
7	29 September 1918 @ 1145 hours	Fokker D.VII	Destroyed	Northeast of Roulers	
8	1 October 1918 @ 1110 hours	Fokker D.VII	Driven down out of control	Southwest of Roulers	
9	1 October 1918 @ 1510 hours	Fokker D.VII	Driven down out of control	Southeast of Armentieres	
10	8 October 1918 @ 1233 hours	DFW reconnaissance craft	Destroyed	Ledgehem	
11	14 October 1918 @ 0855 hours	Fokker D.VII	Driven down out of control	West of Roulers	
12	28 October 1918 @ 1530 hours	Fokker D.VII	Destroyed	West of Audenaarde	
13	1 November 1918 @ 1520 hours	Fokker D.VII	Driven down out of control	East of Tournai	

== Post World War I ==
Stephens earned the Distinguished Flying Cross, which was gazetted to him on 3 June 1919. He was transferred to the RAF's unemployed list on 16 August 1919. He went on to fly for Qantas in the 1930s.
