= Robert Hall (RAF officer) =

World War I flying ace

Robert Norwood Hall
- Born: 17 May 1890; Colony of Natal
- Died: 28 April 1965 (aged 74); South Africa
- Military career
- Allegiance: Union of South Africa
- Branch: Infantry, artillery, then flying service
- Service years: 1909–1920
- Rank: Captain
- Units: Natal Carabiniers, Natal Mounted Rifles, 18th Reserve Battalion of Royal Field Artillery, No. 40 Squadron RFC, No. 44 Squadron RFC
- Awards: Military Cross

Captain Robert Norwood Hall (17 May 1890 – 28 April 1965) was a South African World War I flying ace credited with five aerial victories.

Hall tallied his first win on 24 April 1917, when he drove an enemy two-seater down out of control. On 7 May, he became a balloon buster by destroying three observation balloons on the same mission; Lieutenant Charles Cudemore shared credit on two of these. On 15 August, he destroyed an Albatros D.V for his last triumph. Upon return to Home Establishment, he served with No. 44 Squadron until at least May 1918.

== Bibliography ==
- Above the Trenches: a Complete Record of the Fighter Aces and Units of the British Empire Air Forces 1915-1920. Christopher F. Shores, Norman L. R. Franks, Russell Guest. Grub Street, 1990. ISBN 0-948817-19-4, ISBN 978-0-948817-19-9.
- Nieuport Aces of World War 1. Norman Franks. Osprey Publishing, 2000. ISBN 1-85532-961-1, ISBN 978-1-85532-961-4.
