= Jagdstaffel 22 =

Jasta 22
- Active: 1916–1919
- Country: German Empire
- Branch: Luftstreitkräfte
- Type: Fighter squadron
- Engagements: World War I

Royal Saxon Jagdstaffel 22 was a "hunting group" (i.e., fighter squadron) of the Luftstreitkräfte, the air arm of the Imperial German Army during World War I. As one of the original German fighter squadrons, the unit would score 57 verified aerial victories. Their eleven wins over enemy observation balloons made them a balloon buster squadron.

In turn, their casualties for the war would amount to five pilots killed in action, four killed in midair crashes, one killed in another flying accident, two wounded in action, and two taken prisoner of war.

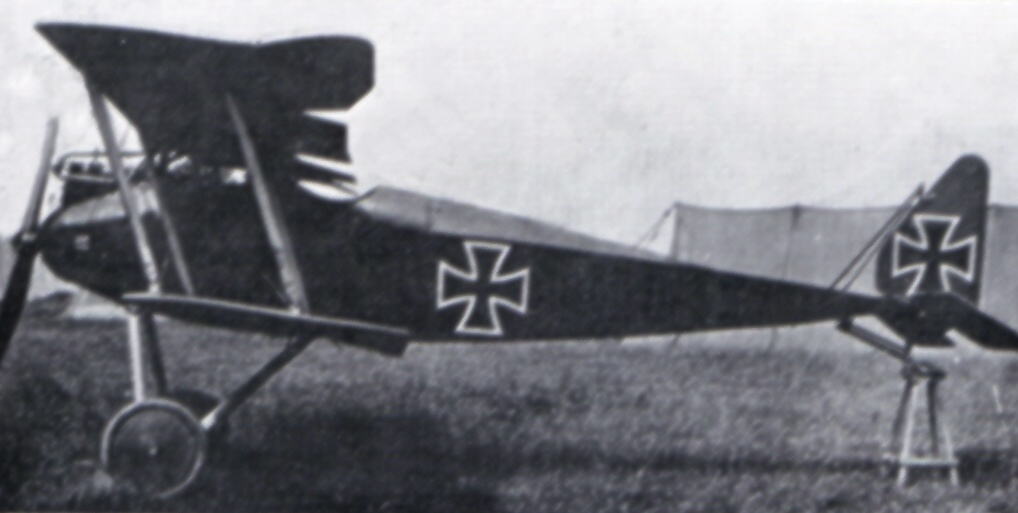
Jasta 22 was initially equipped with Halberstadt DII fighters.

== History ==
Royal Saxon Jagdstaffel 22 was authorized on 25 October 1916; it formed on 16 November 1916. Its genesis was in the 7 Armee area, and its original personnel came from two field flier detachments, FF(A) 11 and FF(A) 29, and an artillery cooperation unit, FA(A) 222. It mobilized on 1 December 1916. First victory for the new unit is debatable; Leutnant Gustav Rose posted a claim for 27 December 1916, but Josef Jacobs was credited with downing a Caudron on 23 January 1917. Jasta 22 would serve through war's end and beyond; the squadron would not disband until 1919, in Marburg.

== Commanding officers (Staffelführer) ==
1. Oberleutnant Erich Hönemanns: transferred in from Jasta 12 on 26 November 1916 – transferred out 29 June 1917
2. Leutnant Alfred Lenz: transferred in from Jasta 4 on 1 July 1917 – served until war's end on 11 November 1918

== Aerodromes ==
Josef Jacobs, triumphant in 48 aerial victories, was a member of Jasta 22.

1. Vaux, Laon: 16 November 1916 – 26 November 1916
2. Riencourt, Arras: 26 November 1916 – 15 May 1917
3. Mont, Verdun: 15 May 1917 – June 1917
4. Vivaise, France: June 1917 – September 1917
5. Mont, Verdun, France: September 1917 – November 1917
6. Near Soissons, France: November 1917 – 19 March 1918
7. La Ferté Ferme, France: 19 March 1918 – 23 March 1918
8. Mont-d'Origny, France: 23 March 1918 – 29 March 1918
9. Villeselve, France: 29 March 1918 – 8 April 1918
10. Ercheu, France: 8 April 1918 – 12 May 1918
11. Mont-Saint-Martin: 12 May 1918 – 8 July 1918
12. Bignicourt, France: 11 July 1918 – 8 August 1918
13. Haubourdin, France: 8 August 1918 – 19 August 1918
14. Guise, France: 20 August 1918 – 11 November 1918

== Notable members ==
- Karl Bohnenkamp: Military Merit Cross winner who scored 15 victories for the Jasta
- Josef Jacobs: Pour le Merite, Iron Cross awardee who went on to become Germany's fourth scoring ace of the war
- Dieter Collin: Iron Cross winner who went on to command Jasta 56
- Erich Thomas: Iron Cross winner whose specialty was balloon busting.

== Aircraft ==
Original equipment at mobilization was nine Halberstadt D.II and two Albatros D.II fighters. The Jasta operated Albatros fighters until it gained Fokker D.VIIs in 1918. It had at least one Siemens-Schuckert D.IV during the closing days of the war, as Staffelführer Lenz used one to become an ace on 29 September 1918, and was delighted with the aircraft.

== Operations ==
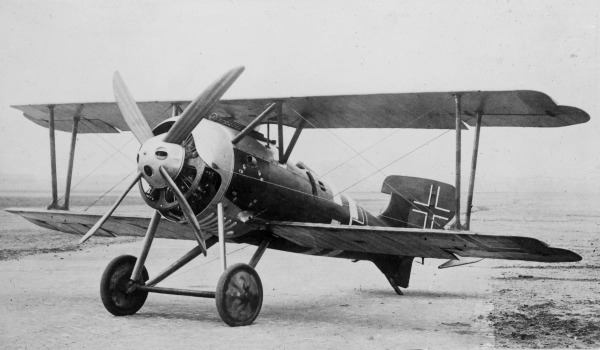
At least one Siemens-Schuckert D.IV was in Jasta 22's inventory at war's end.

Jasta 22 was originally formed in the 7 Armee area. It is known to have supported that army until well into 1917. Jasta 22 fought until war's end, and disbanded in 1919.
