= Frederick McCall =

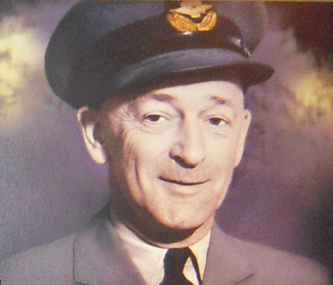
- Born: 4 December 1896; Vernon, British Columbia, Canada
- Died: 22 January 1949 (aged 52); Calgary, Alberta, Canada
- Military career
- Allegiance: George V
- Branch: Royal Flying Corps, Royal Canadian Air Force
- Service years: 1917–1918
- Rank: Squadron Leader
- Units: No. XIII Squadron RAF; No. 41 Squadron RAF
- Conflicts: World War I World War II
- Awards: Distinguished Service Order; Military Cross & Bar; Distinguished Flying Cross
- Other work: Aviation pioneer

Frederick Robert Gordon McCall DSO, MC & Bar, DFC (4 December 1896 – 22 January 1949) was a Canadian air ace during World War I, with 35 confirmed and two unconfirmed victories. After a career in civil aviation, he returned to service in World War II.

== Early life ==
Born in Vernon, British Columbia, McCall came to Calgary with his family in 1906. In February 1916, McCall enlisted with the 175th Battalion of the Canadian Expeditionary Force (CEF). Eight months later, he was in France with this battalion as a sergeant.

McCall expressed interest in transferring from the army to the Royal Flying Corps (RFC), and received a commission as a lieutenant pilot trainee in March 1917. In December was assigned to No. XIII Squadron on the Western Front, flying the two seater Royal Aircraft Factory R.E.8 reconnaissance aircraft with F.C. Farrington.

== Aerial service in World War I ==
McCall's first aerial victory occurred while flying the R.E.8, shooting down a German aircraft. McCall was awarded the Military Cross "for conspicuous gallantry and devotion to duty", and two weeks later the accompanying Bar for downing an enemy scout aircraft while on a mission to take photographs.

After his third victory while flying the R.E.8, McCall was transferred to No. 41 Squadron RAF and began flying the Royal Aircraft Factory S.E.5. He was awarded the Distinguished Flying Cross after scoring four 'kills' in May 1918. On 28 June 1918, McCall downed four enemy aircraft, including one shared with Eric John Stephens. On 30 June 1918, now Captain McCall downed five more Germans, four in the morning and the fifth that evening. For this McCall was awarded the Distinguished Service Order.

On 17 August, he was accompanying William Gordon Claxton when the pair of them ran into Jagstaffel 20, which consisted of at least 40 aircraft. In the ensuing fight, which saw Claxton shot down, McCall scored a victory.

McCall was ordered to England, and eventually to Canada, on convalescent leave. The armistice ending World War I was signed while McCall was in Canada recuperating from illness.

== Life between the wars ==
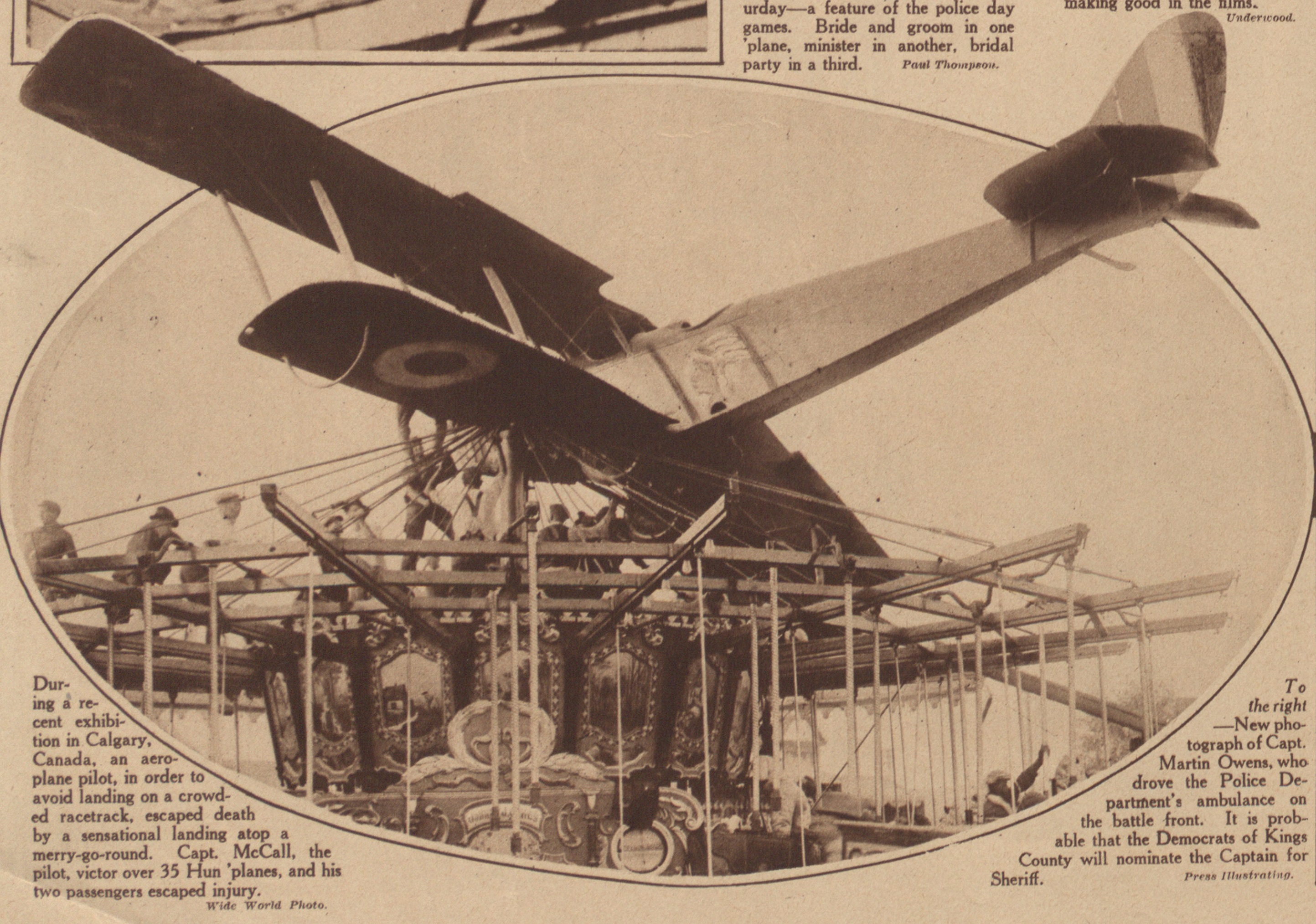
McCall landing atop a merry-go-round at the Calgary Stampede

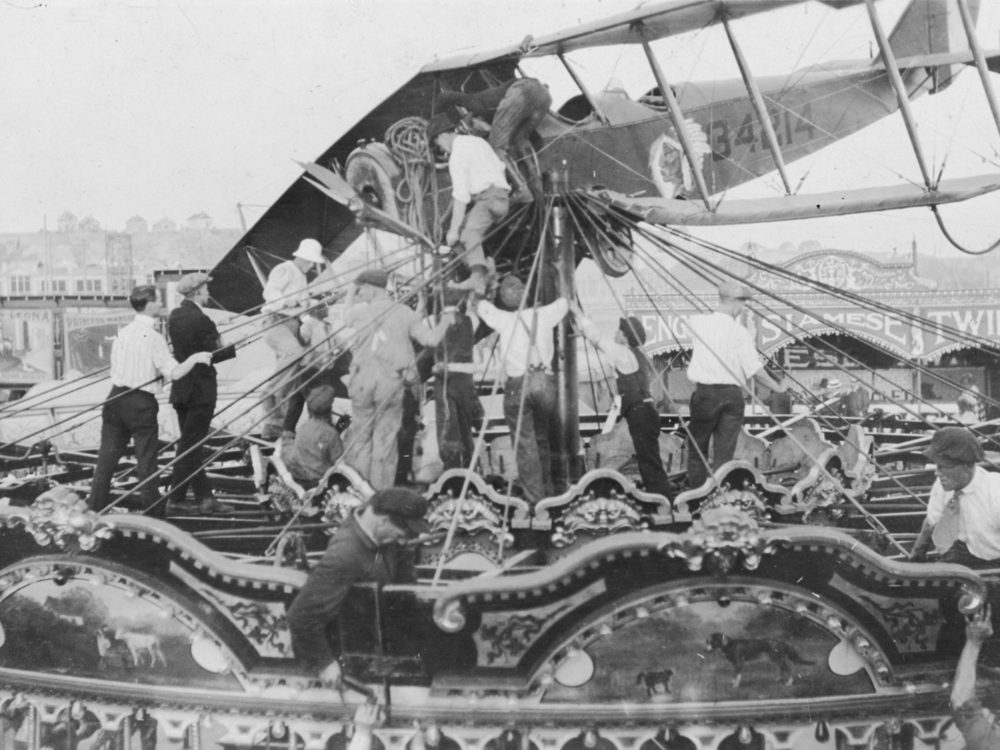
McCall landing atop a merry-go-round at the Calgary Stampede

Following the armistice, McCall embarked upon a variety of civil aviation ventures, beginning with stunt flying. On 5 July 1919, while barnstorming, he crash-landed when his engine failed while he was taking off. His landing site was the top of the merry-go-round at the Calgary Exhibition and Stampede. He and his two passengers were not injured.

He founded his own company, McCall Aero Corporation Limited, in 1920. With this company, McCall flew commercial freight and passengers across Canada, pioneering air travel to Banff.

In 1928, he founded, with Emil Sick, another aviation company Great Western Airways. One of his more spectacular achievements was the flying of 200 quarts of nitroglycerin from Shelby, Montana to Calgary in 1928.

The following year, he ignored bad weather to fly a doctor to the Skiff oil fields to treat two seriously injured workers.

McCall also worked to encourage the formation of Canadian flying clubs in the inter-war years.

== World War II and beyond ==
With the arrival of the Second World War, McCall was recalled to service with the Royal Canadian Air Force as a Squadron Leader, based at numerous western Canadian bases.

McCall died in Calgary Alberta on 22 January 1949 at the age of 52.

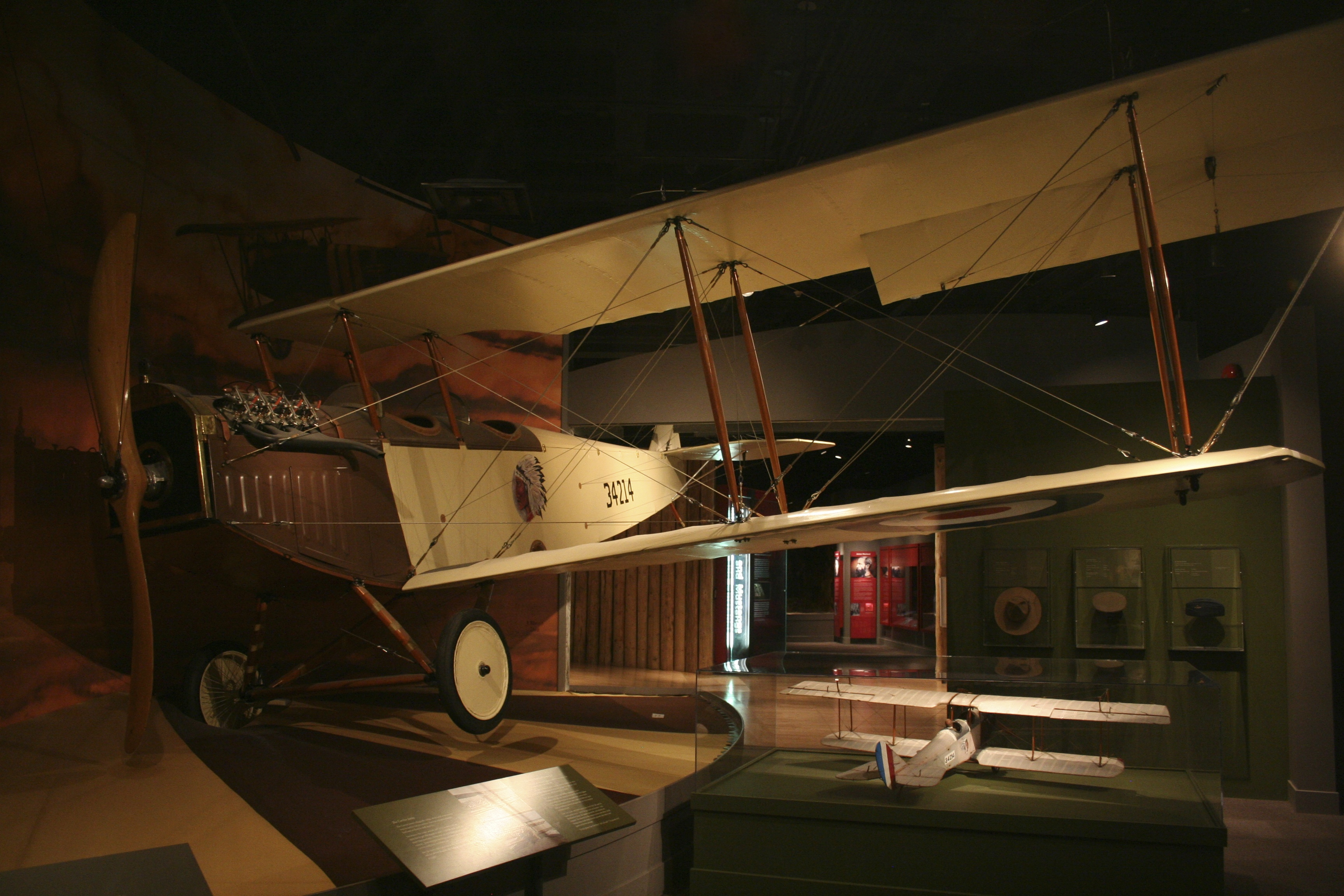
Replica of McCall's aircraft at the Glenbow Museum in Calgary

In the city of Calgary, Alberta, the McCall industrial park and the road 'McCall Way' are named after him, as well as McCall Lake Golf Course. Freddie McCall appears in exhibits in several museums in and around Calgary, such as the Glenbow Museum and the Calgary Aerospace Museum. In 1939, the Calgary Airport was named after him, but has since been renamed Calgary International Airport. There is also a provincial electoral district bearing his name, Calgary-McCall, which was established in 1971. A book entitled Mavericks History of Alberta contains some information on McCall as well.
