= Charles Cudemore =

British World War I flying ace

- Born: Charles William Cudemore; 19 November 1897; Derby, Derbyshire, England
- Died: 1 November 1967 (aged 69); Bingham, Nottinghamshire
- Military career
- Allegiance: England
- Branch: Aviation
- Rank: Captain
- Units: No. 40 Squadron RFC, No. 29 Squadron RFC, No. 64 Squadron RAF
- Awards: Military Cross, Distinguished Flying Cross

Captain Charles William Cudemore MC DFC (19 November 1897 – 1 November 1967) was a British World War I flying ace credited with 15 aerial victories.

== World War I service ==
Cudemore was transferred from the Shropshire Light Infantry as a second lieutenant on 21 June 1915. He opened his victory roll when he and Robert Hall shot down an observation balloon on 7 May 1917; Cudemore then promptly shot down another balloon single-handed. After his transfer from 40 Squadron to 29 Squadron, Cudemore continued to fly a Nieuport in his next three triumphs; he became an ace on 3 September 1917. He was promoted from temporary second lieutenant to temporary lieutenant effective 1 July 1917. He received the Military Cross on 16 October.

There was a lapse in his scoring until 11 August 1918, when he flew a 64 Squadron S.E.5a to a win over a Fokker D.VII, which was driven down out of control. He continued to score through 9 November 1918. A summary of his final results is he destroyed three enemy fighter planes and two observation balloons, and drove down ten enemy planes out of control.

== Post-war service and life ==
On 3 June 1919, Cudemore was awarded the Distinguished Flying Cross. On 8 March 1925, he was appointed flying officer in the RAF. Also in 1925, he was sued for divorce by Carolyn Alice Cudemore. On 15 October 1925, he was transferred to the Class A Reserve.

On 3 September 1939, Cudemore was promoted from flying officer to flight lieutenant in the RAF Reserve.

In his later years, he was landlord at the Manners' Arms, Cotgrave, Nottinghamshire. He retired eight years prior to his death in 1967.

== Honours and awards ==
Military Cross (MC)

T./2nd Lt. Charles William Cudemore, Gen. list and R.F.C.

For conspicuous gallantry and devotion to duty in attacking enemy aircraft and kite balloons. He has brought down at least three enemy machines and three kite balloons, and has taken part in numerous other engagements. He has consistently set a very fine example of pluck and determination in all his attacks.
