= Pierre Delage =

- Born: 19 August 1887; La Coquille, France
- Died: 4 October 1918 (aged 31); Western Front
- Military career
- Allegiance: France
- Branch: Aviation
- Rank: Adjutant
- Units: No. 13 Escadrille, No. 93 Escadrille
- Awards: Légion d'honneur, Médaille militaire, Croix de Guerre

Adjutant Pierre Delage (19 August 1887 – 4 October 1918) Legion d'Honneur, Medaille Militare, Croix de Guerre was a World War I flying ace credited with seven aerial victories.

== Biography ==
Pierre Delage was born in La Coquille in the Dordogne on 19 August 1887. In the early days of World War I, he served in two different infantry regiments, being cited twice. When he was so severely wounded that he could no longer serve as an infantryman, he was transferred to aviation. Once trained as a pilot, he served with Escadrille Sop13. He won the Medaille Militare for his service.

Upon his 1918 transfer to fighter service with Escadrille Spa 93, he downed four German planes and three observation balloons within a month. He received the Legion d/Honneur for his bravery shown in his final combat on 4 October 1918.

== Delage's aerial victories ==
Confirmed victories are charted below. They include a triple victory day. Delage also had four claims that went unconfirmed.

Date	Foe	Result	Location	Notes
16 September 1918 @ 1025 hours	LVG C model	Shot down	Northeast of Juvelize	Victory shared with Gustave Daladier
26 September 1918	Observation balloon	Shot down	North of Somme-Py	Victory shared with Daladier and Meymeil
28 September 1918	Enemy aircraft	Shot down		
2 October 1918	Fokker DVII	Shot down		
2 October 1918	Observation balloon	Shot down	Somme-Py	
2 October 1918	Observation balloon	Shot down	Machault	
4 October 1918	Enemy aircraft	Shot down		

== Sources ==
- Franks, Norman and Frank Bailey (2008). OVER THE FRONT: The Complete Record of the Fighter Aces and Units of the United States and French Air Services, 1914-1918 Grub Street Publishing. ISBN 978-0-94881-754-0
