= Pierre Ducornet =

Pierre Desire Augustin Ducornet
- Born: 19 April 1898; Poix-du-Nord, France
- Died: 17 March 1963 (aged 64); Paris, France
- Military career
- Allegiance: France
- Branch: Aviation
- Service years: 1915-1955
- Rank: Colonel
- Unit: Escadrille 93
- Awards: Légion d'honneur Médaille militaire Croix de Guerre 1914-1918; Croix de Guerre 1939-1945; British Distinguished Conduct Medal
- Other work: Served in World War II and beyond

Pierre Desire Augustin Ducornet was a French World War I flying ace credited with seven aerial victories, five of which were over enemy balloons, the two others were against enemy planes. He would continue active military service until 1933; he was recalled to active duty for World War II. He spent some time as an irregular in the French Resistance before returning to regular service. After the fighting was over, he continued to serve until May 1955.

== Biography ==
=== Early life and World War I ===
Pierre Desire Augustin Ducornet was born on 19 April 1898 in Poix-du-Nord, France.

On 15 August 1915, he volunteered to serve in the French military for the duration of World War I's hostilities. After initial service as a Cuirassier, he was forwarded for pilot training on 28 February 1917. His Military Pilot's Brevet was granted on 4 May 1917. After advanced training, he was posted to Escadrille 93 on 6 August 1917.

Ducornet shot down a Pfalz on 29 May 1918, and a Rumpler on 15 July 1918. He was promoted to Maréchal des logis on the 26th. During August and September 1918, he shot down five German observation balloons to become a balloon buster ace. Coincident to his last victory on 29 September 1918, he was honored with the Médaille Militaire for his valor. By war's end, he had also earned the Croix de Guerre with five palmes and two etoiles d'argent.

=== Between the wars ===
Ducornet remained in service after war's end. In 1919, he was commissioned as a Sous lieutenant. On 16 June 1920, he was inducted into the Legion d'honneur. Then he was promoted to Capitaine before transferring to the reserves in December 1933.

=== World War II and beyond ===
He was recalled in the early days of World War II, and served on the staff of Groupe de Chasse 21 until France fell to the Nazis. He then worked in the French Resistance, winning himself the 1939-1945 Croix de guerre and the British Distinguished Conduct Medal. As the tides of war turned against the Nazis, Ducornet switched back to regular military duties in August 1944 as the Deputy Chief of Staff of the 11th Military District.

When his second war had ended, Ducornet served as commanding officer of airfields at Nancy and Toulouse. He retired in 1955 in the rank of Colonel. On 17 March 1963, he died in Paris.
