= William Gordon Claxton =

Canadian flying ace

William Claxton
- Born: June 1, 1899; Gladstone, Manitoba
- Died: September 28, 1967 (aged 68); Toronto
- Military career
- Allegiance: British Empire
- Branch: Royal Flying Corps; Royal Air Force
- Service years: 1917 - 1918
- Rank: Captain
- Nickname: Dozy
- Unit: No. 41 Squadron RAF
- Awards: Distinguished Service Order; Distinguished Flying Cross & Bar

William Gordon Claxton DSO, DFC & Bar (June 1, 1899 – September 28, 1967) was a Canadian World War I flying ace credited with 37 victories. He became the leading ace in his squadron.

== Background ==
Born on June 1, 1899, in Gladstone, Manitoba, Claxton enlisted with the Royal Flying Corps (RFC) in Canada upon his eighteenth birthday in 1917. After pilot's training at Camp Borden, he was assigned to No. 41 Squadron in France the following March flying S.E.5a aircraft. Claxton arrived on the Western Front late in the war but he had a run of victories that saw him emerge from the war as his squadron's most successful airman. He claimed 37 air victories in 79 days during the war's final year. This meteoric career was marked by several multiple victory days. His calmness under fire earned him the nickname "Dozy". It also led him into situations where his planes experienced battle damage. In June 1918 alone, he crash-landed once and brought home shot planes twice.

== Career as a fighter pilot ==
Claxton opened his tally of 'kills' on May 27, 1918, in the skies above East Estaires, downing a German Fokker Dr.I aircraft. The following day he brought down two Pfalz D.III aircraft.

Between June 12 and June 30, Claxton successfully downed 17 German aircraft plus an observation balloon. Thirteen of these planes fell in a four-day stretch, from June 27 through June 30. On June 30, alone he brought down six enemy aircraft. On that incredible day, he flamed a Pfalz D.II, destroyed two Albatros D.Vs, and drove another Pfalz D.III down out of control — all before lunch. In the afternoon, he destroyed yet another Pfalz D.III and shot a DFW C model down in flames. By the end of July, he had increased his total to 27. On August 3, 1918, Claxton was awarded the Distinguished Flying Cross and appointed flight commander. By that time, his victory list had grown to 30.

On August 17, 1918, Claxton was shot down by Leutnant Johannes Gildemeister during an encounter with Jasta 20 in which he and fellow pilot Frederick McCall were outnumbered 20-to-1; by this time he had amassed 37 air successes. In this dogfight, he brought down three enemy planes before being hit. Claxton crash-landed behind enemy lines with a serious head wound and was only saved by prompt attendance of a German doctor, who performed cranial surgery.

Claxton's final score was two observation balloons destroyed, 16 aircraft driven down out of control, and 19 aircraft destroyed. Two of the planes he destroyed were shared victories with 41 Squadron's second ranking ace, Frederick McCall.

== Post war ==
He remained a prisoner of war until the armistice. Claxton was repatriated on December 1, 1918. Returning to his homeland Claxton, who had received a Bar to his DFC and the Distinguished Service Order (DSO) took up a career as a financial journalist.

He died in Toronto on September 28, 1967, aged 68. He was cremated.

== Text of citations ==
=== Distinguished Flying Cross ===
"Lt. William Gordon Claxton. This officer at all times shows fine courage and disregard of danger. He has accounted for six enemy aeroplanes and one kite balloon, three of the aeroplanes being destroyed and three driven down out of control. On a recent occasion, having destroyed a hostile balloon, he pursued an enemy scout ten miles and eventually drove it down; he was then attacked by five enemy triplanes and other scouts, but managed to return to our lines, though his machine was riddled with bullets."

=== Distinguished Flying Cross - Bar ===
"Lieut. William Gordon Claxton, D.F.C. This officer is conspicuous for his courage in attack. Recently in one day he destroyed six enemy aeroplanes—four in the morning and two in the evening. In thirteen days he accounted for fourteen machines. His utter disregard of danger inspires all who serve with him."

=== Distinguished Service Order ===
"Lieut. William Gordon Claxton, D.F.C. Between 4 July and 12 August this officer destroyed ten enemy aeroplanes and one kite balloon, making in all thirty machines and one kite balloon to his credit. Untiring in attack in the air or on the ground, this officer has rendered brilliant service."
