= Bergnicourt =

- Commune
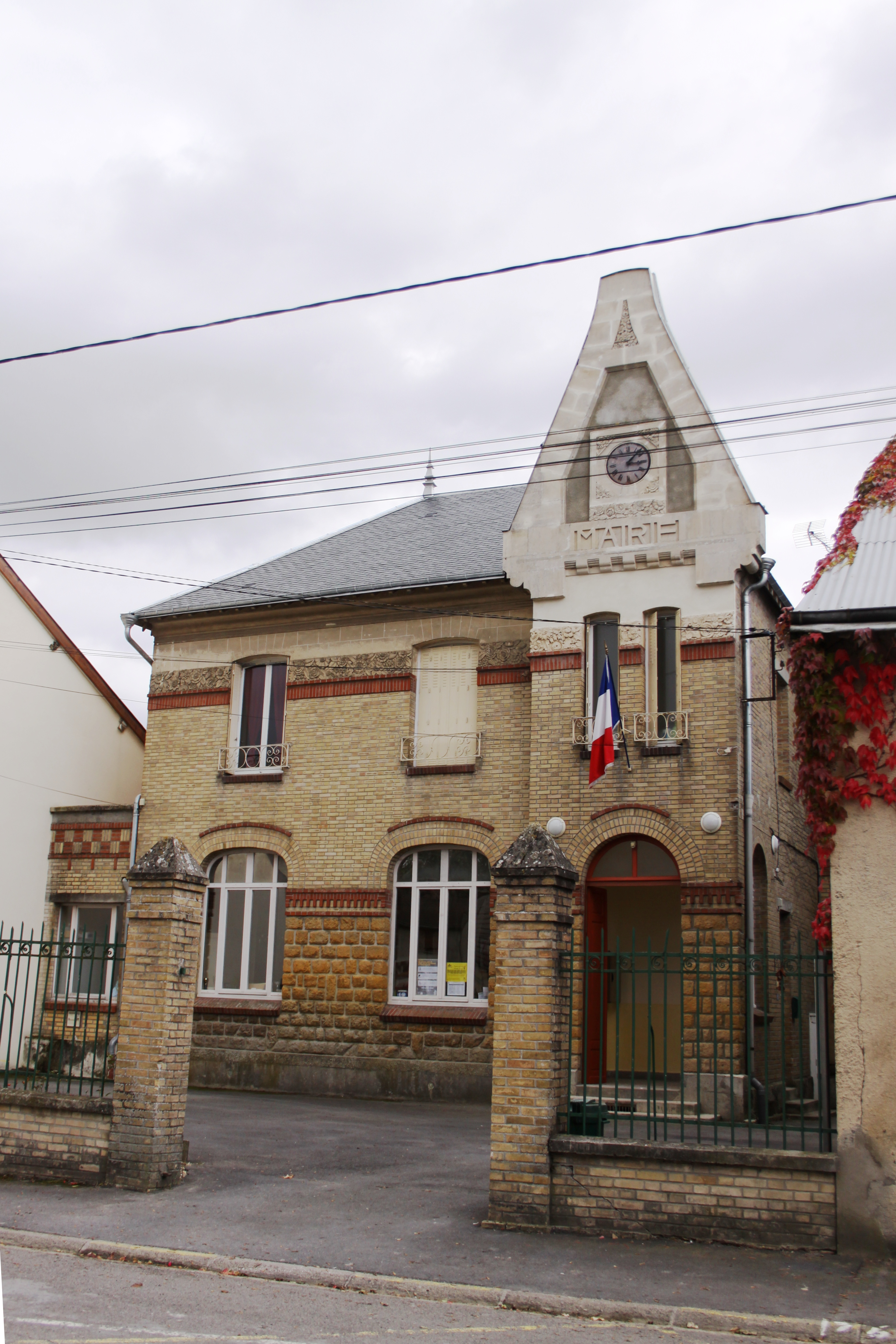
- The town hall in Bergnicourt

- Coat of arms
- Location of Bergnicourt
- Location within France Location within Grand Est
- Coordinates: 49°25′12″N 4°15′21″E
- Country: France
- Region: Grand Est
- Department: Ardennes
- Arrondissement: Rethel
- Canton: Château-Porcien

Government
  - Mayor (2020–2026): Cyrille Marquès
- Area^{1}: 8.16 km^{2} (3.15 sq mi)
- Elevation: 84 m (276 ft)
- Highest elevation: 136 m (446 ft)
- Lowest elevation: 72 m (236 ft)
- Population (2023): 292
  - Density: 35.8/km^{2} (92.7/sq mi)
- Time zone: UTC+01:00 (CET)
  - Summer (DST): UTC+02:00 (CEST)
- INSEE/Postal code: 08060 /08300
- ^{1} French Land Register data, which excludes lakes, ponds, glaciers > 1 km^{2} (0.386 sq mi or 247 acres) and river estuaries.

Bergnicourt (French pronunciation: [bɛʁɲikuʁ]) is a commune in the Ardennes department in northern France.

== Population ==
Historical population
Year	Pop.	±% p.a.
1968	134	—
1975	146	+1.23%
1982	159	+1.23%
1990	164	+0.39%
1999	151	−0.91%
2007	170	+1.49%
2012	246	+7.67%
2017	285	+2.99%
2023	292	+0.41%
Source: INSEE

== See also ==
- Communes of the Ardennes department
