= Josef Jacobs =

German flying ace (1894–1978)

- Born: 15 May 1894; Kreuzkapelle, Rhineland
- Died: 29 July 1978 (aged 84); Munich, West Germany
- Military career
- Allegiance: German Empire
- Branch: Luftstreitkräfte
- Service years: 1914–1919
- Rank: Leutnant
- Nickname: "Kobes"
- Units: Fokkerstaffel West; Feldflieger Abteilung 11; Jagdstaffel 7; Jagdstaffel 12; Jagdstaffel 22
- Awards: Pour le Mérite; House Order of Hohenzollern; Iron Cross

Josef Carl Peter Jacobs PlM (15 May 1894 – 29 July 1978) was a German flying ace with 48 victories during the First World War. The victory total of the prewar flier tied him with Werner Voss for fourth place among the war's German aces. His skill in aerial warfare brought him squadron and wing-level commands. By war's end, he was the leading ace flying the Fokker Triplane.

Postwar, Jacobs fought the communists attempting to take over Germany, before becoming a flight instructor for the Turkish Army. He was also racing both power boats and automobiles, as well as bobsledding. In line with the latter, he became a director of the Adler automobile works. In the 1930s, he also began repairing and manufacturing airplanes. As Hitler rose to power, Jacobs joined the Luftwaffe reserves as a major, but refused to join the Nazi party. He went into hiding in the Netherlands to shelter his company from the Nazis. While his Second World War experience is unknown, afterward Jacobs would own a construction crane company.

== Background ==
Josef Carl Peter Jacobs was born in Kreuzkapelle, Rhineland, German Empire on 15 May 1894, and learned to fly in 1912, aged 18. As a schoolboy in Bonn, he had been fascinated by the activities he saw at the nearby flying school in Hangelar. There he learned to fly, under the tutelage of Bruno Werntgen. When war broke out, he joined up for the Imperial German Army Air Service to train as a pilot with Fliegerersatz-Abteilung (Replacement Detachment) 9.

== Military service ==
=== 1915–16 ===
On 3 July 1915, Jacobs was posted to Feldflieger Abteilung 11 (a reconnaissance squadron) for a year, flying long-range sorties over Allied lines, his first flight occurring the evening of his arrival. His first victory over a French Caudron occurred in February 1916, however, it was unconfirmed, due to lack of independent witnesses. After leave in April, Jacobs was posted to Fokkerstaffel-West to fly a Fokker E.III Eindecker and he finally achieved his first official victory, over an enemy aircraft on 12 May 1916 when he shot down a two-seater Caudron crewed only by its pilot. A week later, he was awarded the Iron Cross First Class. At the end of July, Jacobs and his unit had been pulled back for what became a month's aerial bodyguard duty, protecting General Headquarters at Charleville. On 1 September, Jacobs left this duty that disgusted him, and returned to a front line assignment flying a Fokker E.III. On 19 September, he upgraded to a Fokker D.II.

His old comrade in arms, Kurt Wintgens, was killed in action on 25 September; another old friend, Max Ritter von Mulzer, died in a crash the next day. Three days later, Jacobs fell ill from dysentery; the sickness waylaid him for several weeks. That same day, his airplane was painted a dark blue.

Fokker Staffel West became Jagdstaffel 12 on 6 October 1916, and Jacobs remained with it while recuperating, although a month later he transferred to Jagdstaffel 22, then under the command of Oberleutnant Erich Hönemanns, who was a personal friend.

=== 1917–18 ===
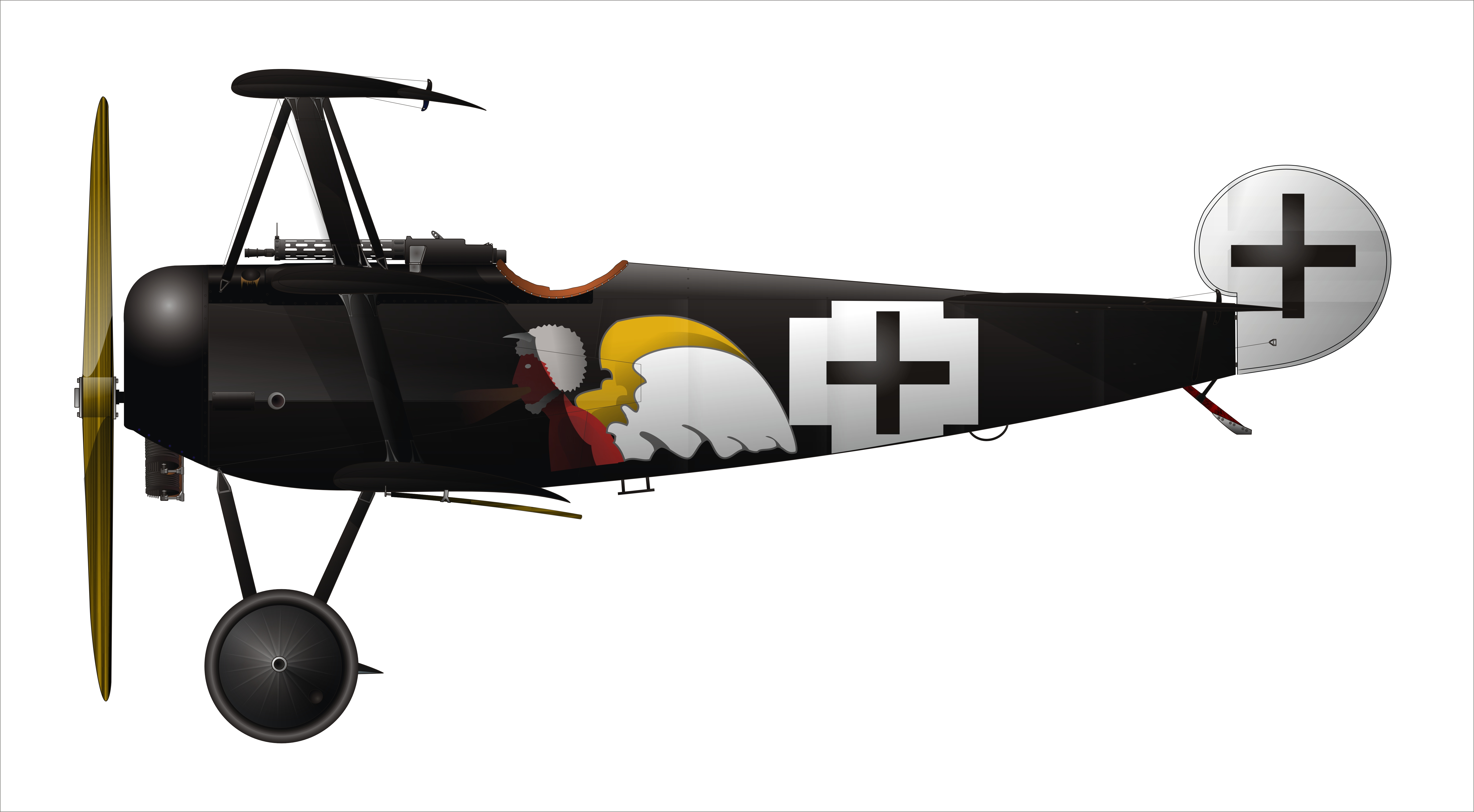
Fokker Triplane flown by Jacobs. On this plane, his insignia of a winged demon is on a black fuselage.

He achieved his second victory (this time over a Caudron R.IV) in January 1917. He achieved three officially confirmed and eight more unconfirmed victories whilst at Jagdstaffel 22, where he remained until 2 August 1917, when he transferred to Jagdstaffel 7 as its Staffelführer (commander) It was also in August that Jacobs received the Royal House Order of Hohenzollern, having previously been awarded both classes of the Iron Cross. His first combat flight leading his squadron was a memorable one. On 21 August, he led his squadron into a Jagdstaffel 26 dogfight, only to see its commander exploded in midair; upon recovery back at base, he survived a low-level landing collision with one of his pilots. On 10 September 1917 Jacobs shot down French ace Jean Matton as his seventh victim.

On 28 February 1918, Jacobs gave up his Albatros D.V and started flying the Fokker Dr.I triplane with Jagdstaffel 7, and had his aircraft finished in a distinctive black scheme. The triplane was his favoured mount until October 1918 and he used its maneuverability to his advantage, becoming the triplane's highest scoring ace, with over 30 confirmed victories.

Jacobs' victory tally slowly rose, until at 24 victories (achieved on 19 July 1918) he was awarded the coveted Pour le Mérite. Jacobs would remain with Jagdstaffel 7 until the armistice; his final victory tally was 48 enemy aircraft and balloons.

== Post-World War I ==
Jacobs continued to fight against the Bolshevik forces in the Baltic area in 1919, with Gotthard Sachsenberg and Theo Osterkamp in Kommando Sachsenberg.

After combat against the Bolsheviks, Jacobs briefly became a flying instructor in the Turkish Army, before completely withdrawing from military activity. In addition to aviation, Jacobs was a keen participant in bob sleighing and car and speedboat racing. He won the first AVUS (the forerunner of Formula 1) race in Berlin. Later he became a director in the Adler automobile works and in the 1930s owned his own aircraft repair and manufacturing company in Erfurt.

After Hitler came into power, Jacobs became a major in the Luftwaffe Reserves, but declined to join the Nazi Party. Then, after refusing to let Göring become a major shareholder in his company, Jacobs moved his company to the Netherlands, and for a time after the German invasion went into hiding.

Jacobs moved to Bavaria after World War II. He owned a construction crane operation, became president of The German Bobsleigh Society, and aided aviation historians of World War I. He died in Munich on 29 July 1978.

== Awards ==
- Pour le Mérite
- Iron Cross, 1st and 2nd Class
- Wound Badge, 1918 version in Silver
- Prussian Military Pilot Badge
- House Order of Hohenzollern, Knight with Swords and Crown
- Hanseatic Cross, Hamburg Version
- Friedrich-August Cross, 2nd Class
- Order of the White Falcon, 2nd Class with Crown and Swords
- Saxe-Ernestine House Order, 2nd Class with Crown and Swords
- Honour Cross of the World War 1914/1918
