= Auguste Lahoulle =

French military officer

Auguste Joseph Marie Lahoulle
- Born: 19 February 1891; Auray, France
- Died: 17 April 1959 (aged 68); Rabat, Morocco
- Military career
- Allegiance: France
- Branch: French Army; French Air Force
- Service years: 1910–c.1942
- Rank: Général
- Units: 2e Regiment de Dragons; 25e Regiment de Dragons; Escadrille 48; Escadrille 23; Escadrille 12; Escadrille 57
- Commands: Escadrille 154
- Awards: Légion d'honneur Croix de Guerre with seven palmes, an étoile de vermeil, and an étoile de bronze

Général Auguste Joseph Marie Lahoulle was a French military officer who began his career as a World War I flying ace. He was a double ace during the war, credited with ten confirmed aerial victories.

== Service before and during World War I ==
=== Ground service ===
Auguste Lahoulle began a four-year enlistment on 10 October 1910. He was promoted to enlisted brigadier and sent to École spéciale militaire de Saint-Cyr as an aspirant on 12 October 1911. He was subsequently commissioned as a sous-lieutenant and assigned to heavy cavalry. He became one of the first casualties of the war, suffering a serious wounding and medical evacuation on 9 August 1914. On 1 October, he was promoted to lieutenant; on 21 December, he returned to combat duty. Nine days later, he was appointed a Chevalier in the Légion d'honneur.

=== Aerial service ===
On 13 April 1916, he was seconded to aviation duty to train as an observer/gunner. On 19 May, he was assigned to Escadrille 48 as a Nieuport observer. On 4 January 1917, he transferred to another Nieuport unit, Escadrille 23; on the 28th, he was sent to Avord as a pilot trainee. On 18 May 1917, he received Military Pilot's Brevet No. 4817 before being forwarded for advanced training at Pau on 24 July. On 18 September 1917, he was assigned to Escadrille N12 ('N' denoting unit's use of Nieuport aircraft), only to transfer back to Escadrille N48 on 16 October.

On 19 January 1918, he was transferred yet again, to Escadrille 57 as a SPAD pilot. Two months later, on 23 March, Lahoulle teamed with Marcel Haegelen and Jean Chaput to shoot down and capture balloon busting ace Erich Thomas in his Albatros D.V; the French trio also downed a second Albatros accompanying Thomas. Two days later, Lahoulle was selected to command Escadrille 154. He opened his account with them on 1 April, teaming with Xavier Moissinac to destroy an observation balloon over Fresnoy-en-Chaussee for a third victory. Three more Germans, all flying Fokker D.VIIs, fell under Lahoulle's guns in May, Moissinac assisting with two of them. On 16 June, Lahoulle destroyed another German fighter plane. Then, on 15 July, in a long day's audacious combat, he flew with Michel Coiffard and a couple of other French pilots to destroy three German balloons in the vicinity of Goussancourt. In the process, Lahoulle was again seriously wounded and evacuated. He was then elevated within the Légion d'honneur to Officier on 5 August 1918. On 1 November 1918, he was selected for duty with the Under-Secretary of State for Aviation.

== Post-war service ==
Lahoulle remained in the profession of arms. He ran the school for fighters at Dijon, where he himself had trained. He was elevated once more within the Légion d'honneur, to Commandeur. During World War II, in 1942, he commanded the fighters stationed at Rabat, Morocco, reaching his final rank of General in the process.

Auguste Joseph Marie Lahoulle died in Rabat on 17 April 1959.
