= Paul Waddington =

Paul Yvan Robert Waddington
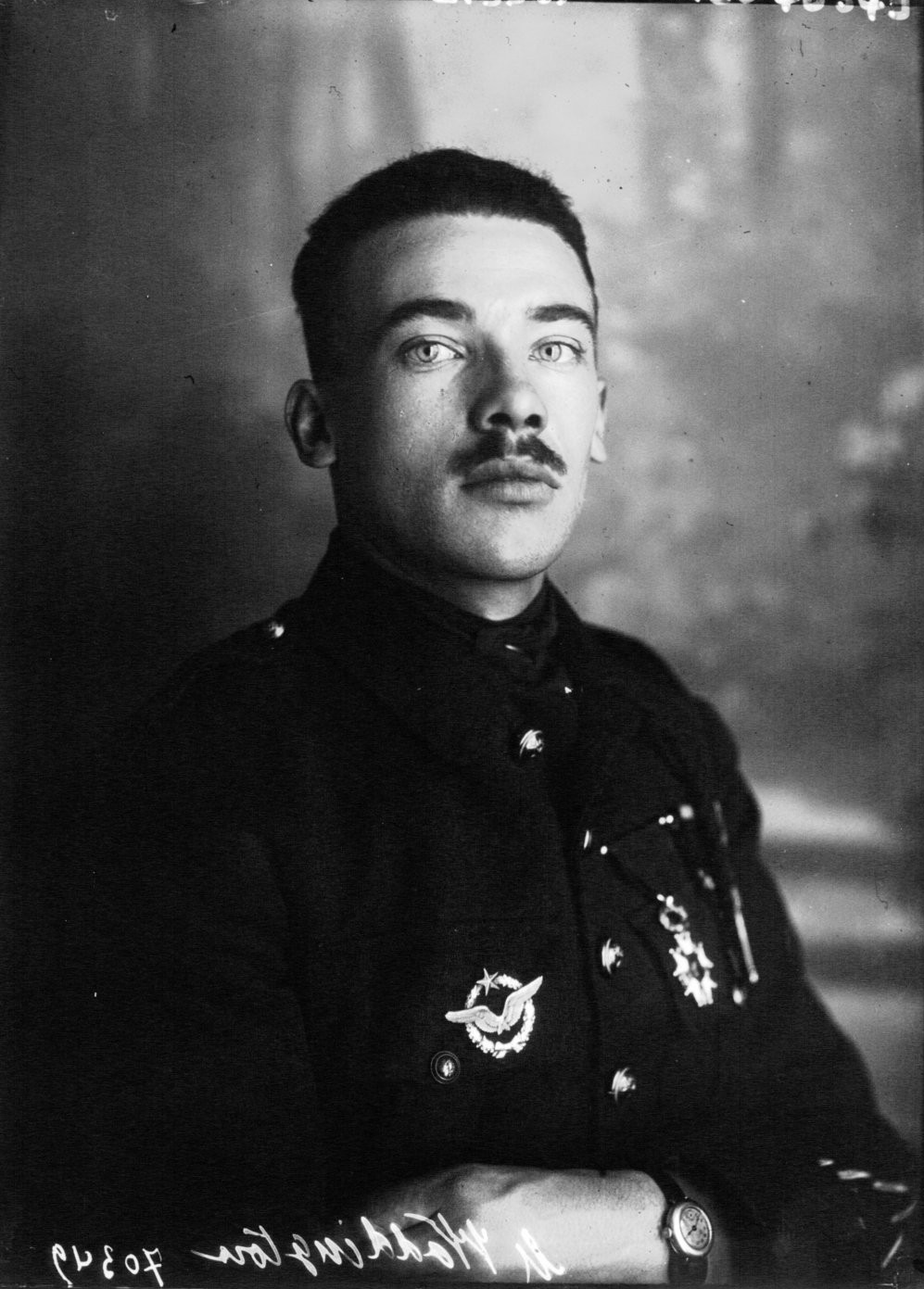
- Image of Paul Yvan Robert Waddington
- Born: 28 October 1893; Lyon, France
- Died: 11 February 1986 (aged 92); Saint-Baudelle, France
- Alma mater: Collège-lycée Ampère; Emlyon Business School
- Military career
- Allegiance: France
- Branch: Infantry; aviation
- Rank: Lieutenant colonel
- Units: 141e Regiment d'Infanterie; Escadrille 67; Escadrille 12; Escadrille 154; Escadrille 31
- Awards: Légion d'honneur Croix de Guerre
- Other work: He rose to the rank of lieutenant colonel by World War II

Sous Lieutenant Paul Yvan Robert Waddington was a French World War I flying ace credited with twelve aerial victories.

== Early life ==
Paul Yvan Robert Waddington was born in Lyon, France, on 28 October 1893. He attended Collège-lycée Ampère, then studied at the École Supérieure de Commerce de Lyon.

== World War I military service ==
Waddington joined the 141e Regiment d'Infanterie on 15 December 1914 as a Soldat de 2e classe. He was promoted to corporal on 21 June 1915; exactly a month later, he was forwarded to the 2e Groupe d'Aviation. On 27 September, he was assigned to Escadrille 67. He was promoted to sergeant while with this unit, on 11 March 1916.

Waddington reported for pilot's training at Buc on 3 September 1916. He was awarded Military Pilot's Brevet No. 5254 on 26 January 1917, and forwarded for advanced training at Avord, and then Pau. He was then posted as a pilot with Escadrille N.12 (the "N" denoting the unit's use of Nieuports) on 28 March 1917. He teamed with Alfred Auger and Joseph M. X. de Sévin for his first victory on 11 May 1917. A promotion to adjutant followed on 20 July 1917, with a further promotion to Sous lieutenant on 25 January 1918. He transferred to Escadrille Spa.154 (which operated Spads), on 6 March 1918. Between 12 April and 22 August 1918, he ran off a string of five victories each over enemy airplanes and observation balloons, with all but one of the wins being shared with such fellow French aces as Xavier Moissinac, Paul Barbreau, Louis Prosper Gros, Michel Coiffard, Jacques Ehrlich, and balloon buster Theophile Condemine. On 19 September 1918, he was transferred to his final wartime post, with Escadrille SPA.31. He scored his final triumph solo ten days later. On 9 November 1918, he was awarded the Légion d'honneur to accompany his prior awards of the Croix de Guerre with five palmes, one étoile de vermeil, one étoile d'argent, and another étoile de bronze. He had also won a Belgian Croix de guerre and a Serbian decoration.

== Postwar career ==
Waddington would later rise to lieutenant colonel and command a school for fighter pilots before World War II.
