= Louis Prosper Gros =

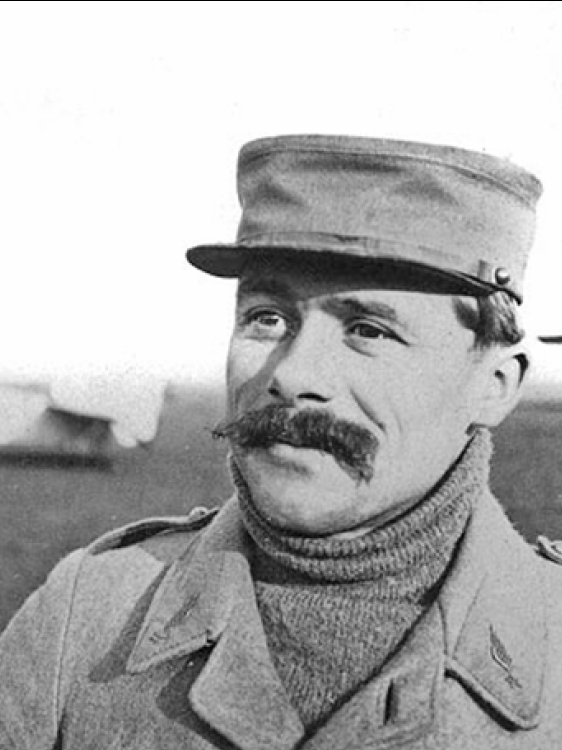
- Born: 24 July 1893; Paris, France
- Died: 3 March 1973 (aged 79)
- Military career
- Allegiance: France
- Branch: Artillery; aviation
- Rank: Sous lieutenant
- Units: 43e Regiment d'Artillerie, Escadrille 41, Escadrille 154
- Awards: Légion d'honneur, Médaille militaire, Croix de Guerre with four palmes, an étoile d'argent, and an étoile d'vermeil

Sous lieutenant Louis Prosper Gros (24 July 1893 – 3 March 1973) became a flying ace during World War I, scoring eight confirmed aerial victories, and possibly a ninth. He continued in aviation after the war, and defended his nation again during World War II.

== World War I ==
Gros enlisted in the French military in 1913. When World War I began, he was serving as an enlisted Brigadier (equivalent to Corporal) in the artillery. On 24 September 1914, he was promoted to Maréchal-des-logis. A year and a day later, he was wounded in action. When he was released from the hospital, he applied for pilot's training. He began his aviation training at Châteauroux on 16 February 1916. On 23 March, he moved on to train at Chartres. On 28 May 1916, he was granted Military Pilot's Brevet No. 3565. He trained further, at Avord and Châteauroux before being assigned to combat duty. On 22 October 1916, he was posted to Escadrille HF41 (the 'HF' denoting the squadron's use of Henri Farman observation aircraft). While with this squadron, he scored his first win on 13 April 1917, won the Médaille militaire (Note: Award of the Croix de Guerre was a prerequisite for this award) on 5 May 1917, and was promoted to Adjutant on 5 November 1917. On 21 December, he was sent to fighter pilot's training.

Gros was posted to Escadrille 154 as a Spad pilot on 1 January 1918. He was a team player, sharing seven victories between 3 April and 22 August 1918 with such other balloon buster aces as Paul Y. R. Waddington, Paul Barbreau, Paul Petit, Jacques Ehrlich, Théophile Henri Condemine, and Michel Coiffard. A ninth victory is ascribed to him, but no details are available on it.

Gros was given a temporary promotion to Sous lieutenant during this string of victories, on 26 April 1918. He was also wounded again, on 15 September. He was inducted into the Légion d'honneur on 9 October 1918. (Note: Award of the Croix de Guerre was a prerequisite for this award)

== Post World War I ==
Louis Prosper Gros continued to fly following the war, amassing some 3,500 flight hours. He returned to his country's service on two occasions, during 1935–1936, and again for World War II.
