= Théophile Henri Condemine =

- Born: January 25, 1895; Champagne-et-Fontaine, France
- Died: 20 December 1981 (aged 86); Angoulême, Charente, France
- Military career
- Allegiance: France
- Branch: Cavalry; aviation
- Rank: Lieutenant Colonel
- Units: 10ème Régiment de Hussards, 68ème Régiment d'Infanterie, Escadrille 154
- Awards: Legion of Honour, Croix de Guerre with five palmes (palm branches) and an étoile de bronze (bronze star)

Lieutenant Colonel Théophile Henri Condemine, or Henri Théophile Condemine, (25 January 1895 – 20 December 1981) was a French soldier and fighter pilot who began his military career during World War I. He became a flying ace credited with nine confirmed aerial victories, all against observation balloons. He also served during World War II.

== Early life ==
Théophile Henri Condemine was born on 25 January 1895 in Champagnac-Fontaine.

== World War I ==
Condemine joined the French military on a three-year enlistment on 10 February 1914, and was assigned to the cavalry. He was promoted to enlisted brigadier on 1 August 1914; on 26 April 1916, he was promoted again, to Maréchal-des-logis. On 3 December 1916, he was detached to infantry duty. While in this assignment, he was commissioned as a sous-lieutenant. On 29 July 1917, he was severely wounded in the face, but carried on despite a German artillery barrage. A month later, he was awarded the Légion d'honneur for this action.

After healing, Condemine was transferred to aviation training at Chartres, arriving the day before Christmas in 1917. On 10 March 1918, he was granted Military Pilot's Brevet Number 12102; two days later, he was sent to Pau for advanced training. Early on 22 August 1918, he arrived at Escadrille 154 to serve as a SPAD XIII pilot; at noon, he scored his first aerial victory, teaming with Paul Y. R. Waddington and Louis Prosper Gros to destroy a German observation balloon. On 7 September, he destroyed a balloon singlehanded. A week later, he teamed with Michel Coiffard to destroy a balloon over Gernicourt and another one at Cormicy. The next day, Condemine, Coiffard, and Jacques Ehrlich downed three more balloons in two minutes. Condemine rounded out his career as a balloon buster with solo victories a week apart, on 3 and 10 October 1918, the last two wins for his squadron. On 28 October, he flew a protective escort for Coiffard after the latter's wounding during his final fatal mission.

== Post-World War I ==
Condemine survived the war. He returned to service during World War II, rising to the rank of lieutenant colonel.
