= Escadrille Spa.154 =

WWI French Air Force unit (1917–18)

- Active: 1917–1918
- Country: France
- Branch: French Air Service
- Type: Fighter Squadron
- Battle honours: Mentioned in dispatches

Escadrille Spa.154 (originally Escadrille N.154) was a French fighter squadron active from July 1917 through the 11 November 1918 Armistice. It spent most of 1918 as a constituent of larger offensive units. At war's end, it was credited with 63 aerial victories, including at least 19 observation balloons.

== History ==
Founded as Escadrille N.154 on 11 July 1917 because it was originally equipped with Nieuport fighters at Matigny, France, the squadron originally served III Armee. It was temporarily subsumed into a makeshift Groupe de Combat. On 1 August, this ad hoc unit was dissolved, and the constituent squadrons moved into another Groupe supporting III Armee. In December, the squadron was refitted with SPADs and renamed Escadrille Spa.154.

On 22 January 1918, the escadrille was shifted to V Armee; then it was merged into Groupe de Combat 11 as a replacement for Escadrille SPA.48. On 27 February, Groupe de Combat 11 was one of the units concentrated into Escadre de Combat No. 2.

Escadrille Spa.154 would operate as part of a larger force for the remainder of the war. Groupe de Combat 11 would be shifted to support of several different French field armies during the fighting leading up to the Armistice. On 20 August 1918, Escadrille Spa.154 was Mentioned in dispatches for having downed 17 German airplanes and 19 observation balloons. By war's end on 11 November 1918, the squadron was credited with a score of 63 aerial victories.

== Commanding officers ==
- Lieutenant Raoul Augereau: 11 July 1917 - 25 March 1918
- Lieutenant Auguste Lahoulle: 25 March 1918 - wounded in action 5 July 1918
- Sous lieutenant Michel Coiffard: 15 July 1918 - died of wounds 28 October 1918
- Lieutenant Charles Nuville: 6 November 1918

== Notable members ==
- Lieutenant Auguste Lahoulle
- Sous lieutenant (later Lieutenant colonel) Théophile Henri Condemine
- Sous lieutenant Paul Barbreau:
- Sous lieutenant Michel Coiffard
- Sous lieutenant Jacques Ehrlich
- Sous Lieutenant Robert Waddington
- Adjutant Paul Petit
- Maréchal des logis Xavier Moissinac

== Aircraft ==
- Nieuport fighters: 11 July 1917 - December 1917
- SPAD fighters: December 1917 onwards
