= Charles Nuville =

French flying ace

- Born: 4 March 1889; Puybrun
- Died: 18 January 1965 (aged 75); Puybrun
- Military career
- Allegiance: France
- Branch: Aviation
- Rank: Lieutenant colonel
- Units: Escadrille 57, Escadrille 154
- Awards: Légion d'honneur, Croix de Guerre, Belgian Croix de guerre, Mentioned in Dispatches

Lieutenant Colonel Charles Marie Joseph Leon Nuville (March 1889 – 18 January 1965) was a French World War I flying ace credited with twelve confirmed aerial victories. He served as a professional soldier throughout the interwar years, and through World War II.

== Early life ==
Charles Marie Joseph Leon Nuville was born on 4 March 1889 in Puybrun.

== World War I ==
=== Early service ===
On 2 August 1914, as World War I began, Charles Nuville was called from the reserves to active military duty as a Sergeant with the 83e Regiment d'Infanterie. On 21 January 1915, he was promoted to Adjutant. On 26 March 1915, he was severely wounded in the foot in an action that brought him a Mention in Dispatches. After a lengthy recuperation, he was forwarded to 1e Groupe d'Aviation on 18 January 1916. He undertook pilot's training at Buc and Avord, and was awarded Military Pilot's Brevet No. 1721 on 9 June 1916. Further training followed, at Pau and Cazaux, before he was sent for assignment on 2 October 1916. He reached Escadrille N57, a Nieuport squadron, on 25 November 1916

=== Aerial success ===
Nuville would not score his first aerial victory until 24 September 1917; in exactly one year, he would score a dozen. In all but one instance, he shared the victories with one or more fellow French pilots, including such fellow aces as Jean Alfred Fraissinet, Marius Hasdenteufel, Andre Petit-Delchet, Jean Dubois de Gennes, and Marcel Haegelen.

=== Promotions and honors ===
On 6 November 1917, Nuville was commissioned a Temporary Sous lieutenant. This commission was confirmed on 1 July 1918. On 8 August 1918, he was appointed a Chevalier de Légion d'honneur in a citation that dubbed him, "Elite officer, model of bravery, taking part daily in difficult combats where his skill and audacity always win over his adversaries thereby gaining for him the admiration of those around him. During recent battles his efforts have been superb. He reported his 10th official victory by downing a plane behind our lines." On 6 November 1918, he was appointed to command of a Spad Squadron, Escadrille 54. A month later, he was promoted to Lieutenant. Now that the war was over, he had, in addition to his Légion d'honneur, his country's Croix de Guerre with five palmes and five étoiles de vermeil, the Belgian Croix de guerre, and the Italian Silver Medal of Military Valor.

== Post World War I ==
Nuville remained in military service after World War I. In 1919, he was elevated to the status of Officier de Légion d'honneur. He was still in service when World War II began, and defended his nation as a Lieutenant Colonel commanding the 5e Escadre de chasse. He finally retired in 1945.
