= Paul Barbreau =

Algerian-born French World War I flying ace

Paul Augustin Edouard Barbreau
- Born: 16 September 1894; Renault, Oran, Algeria
- Died: 2 June 1976 (aged 81); Marseille, France
- Military career
- Allegiance: France
- Branch: French Army; French Air Force
- Service years: 1914–1919
- Rank: Captain
- Units: 5e régiment de chasseurs d'Afrique; Escadrille 154; Escadrille 164
- Conflicts: World War I • Western Front
- Awards: Légion d'honneur Médaille militaire Croix de Guerre with four Palmes, an Étoile de vermeil, an Étoile d'argent, and an Étoile de bronze

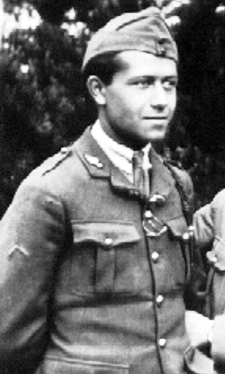
Paul Barbreau (1894–1976) French pilot during WW1

Captain Paul Augustin Edouard Barbreau (16 September 1894 – 2 June 1976) was an Algerian-born French World War I flying ace credited with eight aerial victories.

== Early life ==
Barbreau was born in Renault, Oran, Algeria, the son of Pierre Augustin Barbreau, an administrateur-adjoint, and Marie Louise Benoist. He joined the French Army on his twentieth birthday, 16 September 1914. His initial assignment was as a Soldat de 2e Classe in the 5e Regiment de Chasseurs d'Afrique. He was promoted to the rank of enlisted brigadier in November 1914, and to maréchal-des-logis on 6 February 1915.

== World War I aviation service ==
Barbreau transferred to the army's military aviation branch in April 1917, reporting to Amberieu for pilot's training. On 14 May, he received Military Pilot's Brevet No. 6406. On 1 June, he passed on to Avord for advanced training. After polishing his skills at Pau and Cazaux, he was posted to a Nieuport squadron, Escadrille N 154, on 1 October 1917. (Note: Note: When a French squadron upgraded its equipment, it eventually changed its unit designation to reflect the new equipment. Thus, Barbreau originally flew in Nieuports.)

The squadron eventually upgraded its equipment to SPAD S.VII fighters, and subsequently changed its name to Escadrille SPA 154. Under the command of Michel Coiffard SPA 154 specialized in attacking enemy observation balloons, with Barbreau sharing their success, as he became a balloon buster, destroying eight between 2 June and 8 August 1918. His victories brought him the Médaille militaire and a temporary commission as an officer. He was transferred to Escadrille 164 on 8 August 1918.

== List of aerial victories ==
Barbreau is believed to have flown some version of the SPAD to score his aerial victories.

Source
No.	Date/time	Opponent	Result	Location	Notes
1	2 June 1918	German observation balloon	Destroyed	Igny d'Abbesse	Shared with Sous-lieutenant Paul Waddington
2	5 June 1918 @ 18:00 hours	German observation balloon	Destroyed	Trigny, France	Shared with Sous-lieutenants Louis Prosper Gros and Paul Waddington
3	30 June 1918 @ 06:50 hours	German observation balloon	Destroyed	Beuvardes, France	Shared with Sous-lieutenant Michel Coiffard and Maréchal-des-logis Jacques Ehrlich
4	17 July 1918 @ 08:45 hours	German observation balloon	Destroyed	Beine, France	Shared with Sous-lieutenant Paul Waddington
5	18 July 1918 @ 19:15 hours	German observation balloon	Destroyed	Forêt-de-Ris	Shared with Sergeant Wainwright Abbott (Lafayette Flying Corps)
6	1 August 1918 @ 17:40 hours	German observation balloon	Destroyed	Caurel, France	Shared with Sous-lieutenant Paul Waddington
7	3 August 1918 @ 19:35 to 19:37 hours	German observation balloon	Destroyed	North of Somme-Py, France	Shared with Sous-lieutenant Michel Coiffard
8	3 August 1918 @ 19:35 to 19:37 hours	German observation balloon	Destroyed	North of Somme-Py, France	Shared with Sous-lieutenant Michel Coiffard

== Post World War I ==
Although his heroics ended at the ceasefire of 11 November 1918, he was not made a Chevalier of the Légion d'honneur until 12 July 1919, while serving as a second lieutenant (reserve) in Algeria. The accompanying citation mentioned victories over five enemy aircraft, but there is no individual listing or confirmation of these victories.

He eventually retired from the French Air Force with the rank of captain, receiving promotion to the rank of Officier of the Légion d'honneur on 31 October 1961.

He died in Marseilles on 2 June 1976.
