= Jean Alfred Fraissinet =

- Born: 22 June 1894; Marseilles, France
- Died: 23 May 1981 (aged 86); Cogolin, France
- Relatives: Family was prominent in shipping
- Military career
- Allegiance: France
- Branch: Cavalry; aviation
- Service years: 1914–1919; also World War II
- Rank: Capitaine
- Unit: Escadrille 57
- Awards: Légion d'honneur, Croix de Guerre with five Palmes and an Etoile de bronze
- Other work: Ran a shipping line, founded and owned newspapers, became a vintner, served in French National Assembly

Heir to the Compagnie Fraissinet, Lieutenant (later Captain) Jean Alfred Fraissinet also served in the French Air Force during World War I, becoming a flying ace credited with eight aerial victories. Postwar, he took the helm of his family's shipping line in 1927. He founded two newspapers and bought another. He also bought the Château Saint-Maur and transformed it into a winery. The capstone of his career came in 1958, when he was elected to his nation's National Assembly as a member of the National Centre of Independents and Peasants.

== Early life and ground service ==
Jean Alfred Fraissinet was born in the port city of Marseilles, France on 22 June 1894. When World War I began, he joined the ranks of the French military, being assigned to the 6th Hussar Regiment on 7 September 1914. On 6 November 1914, he was promoted to the enlisted rank of Brigadier. After promotion to Maréchal-des-logis on 27 September 1915, he attended school at Saumur, beginning on 26 April 1916. On 1 August 1916, he was appointed an Aspirant. He then reported to Dijon for pilot training.

== Aerial service in World War I ==
After a further transfer to Chartres on 3 September 1916, he received his military pilot's license on 4 November 1916. He underwent advanced training before posting to Escadrille N57 on 14 March 1917. (Note: Some sources give 7 March 1917 as the date of his arrival with N57.) His commissioning as a temporary sous lieutenant followed on 17 August 1917. The following month, he began his victory string. (Note: The prefix "N" denotes that the escadrille was then equipped with Nieuports. It would subsequently re-arm with Spads and be redesignated as "Spa57".)

He won the Croix de Guerre with five Palmes and an Etoile de bronze for his gallantry. On 24 September 1918, he was promoted to lieutenant. On 1 October 1918, Fraissinet and his wingman attacked a formation of 20 German two-seaters engaged in trench strafing; Fraissinet set two of them aflame. This courageous feat was rewarded with the Légion d'honneur on 9 November 1918.

== List of aerial victories ==
See also Aerial victory standards of World War I

| No. | Date/time | Aircraft | Foe | Result | Location | Notes |
|---|---|---|---|---|---|---|
| 1 | 24 September 1917 @ 1435 hours | Spad | Albatros reconnaissance plane | Destroyed | Fort de la Pompelle | Victory shared with Charles Nuville and another French pilot |
| 2 | 12 April 1918 | Spad | Aviatik reconnaissance plane | Destroyed | Hangard | |
| 3 | 2 May 1918 | Spad | Aviatik reconnaissance plane | Destroyed | Domart-sur-la-Luce | |
| 4 | 31 May 1918 | Spad | Albatros reconnaissance plane | Destroyed | Étrépilly | Victory shared with Marcel Nogues and another French pilot |
| 5 | 23 June 1918 | Spad | Halberstadt reconnaissance plane | Destroyed | South of Reims | |
| 6 | 15 July 1918 @ 0455 hours | Spad | Albatros reconnaissance plane | Destroyed | Fleury | Victory shared with Charles Nuville and another French pilot |
| 7 | 1 October 1918 @ 1800 hours | Spad | Halberstadt reconnaissance plane | Destroyed; set afire | Aure | |
| 8 | 1 October 1918 @ 1805 hours | Spad | Halberstadt reconnaissance plane | Destroyed; set afire | Somme-Py | Victory shared with another French pilot |

== After World War I ==
Fraissinet would not be discharged from military service until 7 October 1919.

In 1927, Jean Fraissinet replaced his father Alfred as head of the Compagnie Fraissinet, the family's shipping firm. Fraissinet married Mathilde Cyprien-Fabre, who was the daughter of a prominent shipping family, Compagnie Française de Navigation à Vapeur Cyprien Fabre (Fabre Line). In 1930, the two shipping firms, as well as a third line, integrated operations to mutually increase their commercial competitiveness. The following year, Fraissinet established two newspapers–Marseille-Soir and Marseille-Matin.

The threeway alliance of shipping companies lasted until 1935; then Fraissinet consolidated the Fabre Line and the Compagnie Fraissinet and abandoned the third company to its fate.

On 23 May 1937, he bought the historic Château Saint-Maur and its grounds from Sir Henry Laurens, the wealthy tobacconist. Fraissinet turned the property from its former agricultural uses of growing wheat, beets, and cotton into vineyards.

Fraissinet returned to his country's service in World War II, rising to the rank of captain. In January 1941, he was made a member of the National Council of Vichy France. Following the war, in 1947 he bought another newspaper, Le Méridional. In 1952, he merged it with Sud-Est and La France de Marseille.

As a culmination of the right wing nationalist views he espoused in his newspapers, he was elected to the National Assembly of France, as a member of the National Centre of Independents and Peasants party, on 30 November 1958. Jean Fraissinet passed direction of the family concern to his son Roland. During Jean Fraissinet's four years in political office, he was a staunch advocate of retaining a French Algeria, thus being opposed to Charles de Gaulle's policies. Fraissinet's term ended on 9 October 1962; he was not re-elected.

The Fraissinet family shipping company docked its last ship in 1968, and withdrew entirely from the shipping business in 1974, ending 138 years of maritime service.

Jean Fraissinet died in 1981 leaving behind him three children (Roland Fraissinet, Regis Fraissinet, Nadine Patricot-Fraissinet) and eight grandchildren (Hadrien Fraissinet, Eric Fraissinet, Marc Fraissinet, Dora Fraissinet, Ines Fraissinet, Philippe Patricot, Chantal Patricot, Noel Patricot).
