= Andre Petit-Delchet =

French flying ace

Andre Marie Paul Petit-Delchet
- Born: September 29, 1892; Villers-sur-Mer, France
- Died: July 28, 1918 (aged 25); Villessneux
- Military career
- Allegiance: France
- Branch: Flying service
- Rank: Adjutant
- Units: Ecadrille MF.72; Escadrille N.69; Escadrille SPA.57
- Awards: Médaille militaire Croix de Guerre

Adjutant Andre Marie Paul Petit-Delchet was a French World War I flying ace credited with five confirmed aerial victories and two probable ones.

== Biography ==
See also Aerial victory standards of World War I

Andre Marie Paul Petit-Delchet was born in Villers-sur-Mer, France on 29 September 1892.

Petit-Delchet enlisted in a French-Algerian military unit at the outbreak of World War I. He transferred to a French cavalry regiment. On 1 November 1915, he reported for aviation training. He was granted a Military Pilot's Brevet in May 1916. After advanced training, he was posted to Escadrille N.69 on 21 December 1916.

Some time later, he was pulled from combat for additional training. On 29 March 1918, he returned to the front as an Adjutant pilot for Escadrille SPA.57. On 21 April, he began a string of five victories—the first three being enemy airplanes, the last two observation balloons. French fighter pilots in 1918 were hunting Germans in packs; Petit-Delchet shared four of his victories, with such fellow aces as Marius Hasdenteufel, Marcel Nogues, and Charles Nuville.

On 28 July 1918, Petit-Delchet was taking off for a combat patrol when he crashed and died. By the time of his death, he had been awarded the Médaille militaire and the Croix de Guerre with four palmes and three etoiles.
