= Paul Petit (aviator) =

Paul Armand Petit
- Born: 17 January 1890; Paris, France
- Died: 18 September 1918 (aged 28); Brimont, France
- Military career
- Allegiance: France
- Branch: Infantry; aviation
- Service years: 1911–1918
- Rank: Adjutant
- Unit: Escadrille 154
- Awards: Legion d'Honneur; Croix de Guerre

Adjutant Paul Armand Petit (French: [pɔl pəti]; 17 January 1890 – 18 September 1918) was a World War I flying ace credited with seven aerial victories, at least four of which were observation balloons.

He was killed when his SPAD S.XIII was shot down on 18 September 1918.

== Biography ==
See also Aerial victory standards of World War I

Paul Armand Petit was born in Paris on 17 January 1890.

He began his required military service on 8 October 1911 as an infantryman. When the First World War began, his regiment was called to the colors. He served in the ground forces until 15 April 1917, when he was sent to pilot's training. On 25 June, he graduated with his Military Pilot's Brevet. After advanced training, he was posted to Escadrille Spa.154 on 15 September 1917.

His first aerial victory, on 2 April 1918, was a lone-hand destruction of an Albatros. He was promoted to Adjutant on 2 June 1918. He began a string of victories while flying in a "wolfpack" with such other squadron aces as Michel Coiffard, Louis Prosper Gros, and Jacques Ehrlich.

The pack approach was especially effective against that most hazardous of aerial targets, observation balloons. Beginning 30 June 1918, he helped in shooting down three of the German observation balloons, as well as a Fokker D.VII. Then, on 18 September 1918, a German trap closed on the French attackers as they streaked away from a balloon they had set aflame near Brimont. A Jagdstaffel 66 formation of 11 Fokker D.VIIs dived on the Frenchmen's SPADs. At the same time, ground fire opened up on the French fighters. Caught between fires, Paul Petit fell, mortally wounded; Jacques Ehrlich also went down, into captivity.

== Honors and awards ==
- Legion d'honneur:
- Croix de Guerre with six palmes, an etoile de vermeil, and an etoile de bronze
