= Groupe de Combat 11 =

Groupe de Combat 11 of the French Air Force was founded on 1 November 1916, being formed by consolidating Escadrilles 12, 31, 48, and 57.

The groupe was equipped with a melange of SPADs, Nieuports, Sopwiths, and Morane-Saulniers when it was posted to V Armee of the French Army in early February 1917. Within the month, it had moved to IV Armee. In July 1917, it moved to Flanders as fighting intensified.

Groupe de Combat 11 was inducted into a larger unit, Escadre de Combat No. 2, on 27 February 1918, under command of Chef de Bataillon Phillip Fequant. GC 11 supported I Armee and III Arme from March onward. On 14 May 1918, Escadre de Combat No. 2 was one of the units incorporated into the larger 1er Division Aerienne. However, on 28 May, GC 11 was detached to support both IV Armee and V Armee.

== Commanding officers ==
- Capitaine Edouard Dusiegneur: January 1917 – 19 June 1918
- Capitaine Marcel Bonnevay: 20 June 1918

== Notable personnel ==
- Armand de Turenne
- Henri Languedoc
- Pierre Dufaur de Gavardie
- Joseph M. X. de Sévin
- Lieutenant Jacques Ortoli
- Adjutant Georges Blanc
- Sous Lieutenant Jules Covin
- Sous Lieutenant François Portron
