= Marcel Nogues =

WW1 French flying ace

Marcel Joseph Maurice Nogues
- Born: January 24, 1895; Paris, France
- Died: October 5, 1919 (aged 24)
- Military career
- Allegiance: France
- Branch: Artillery; Aviation
- Service years: 1914 – ca 1918
- Rank: Sous lieutenant
- Units: 6c Regiment d'Artilleie Coloniale; 107c Regiment d'Artillerie Lourde; Escadrille 12; Escadrille 57; Escadrille 172
- Conflicts: World War I

Sous Lieutenant Marcel Joseph Maurice Nogues was a World War I flying ace credited with thirteen aerial victories. He was an ace over enemy observation balloons, as well as enemy airplanes.

== Early life ==
Marcel Joseph Maurice Nogues was born on 24 January 1895 in Paris.

== World War I service ==
Nogues joined the artillery on 4 September 1914. After volunteering for pilot's training, he was detached from the artillery to aviation on 24 January 1916. He gained his Military Pilot's Brevet, No. 3486, on 20 May 1916. He then underwent a series of advanced training assignments, at Dijon, Ambrieu, Avord, Cazau, and Pau. On 26 September 1916, he was posted to Escadrille N12 (the 'N' representing Nieuport). On 4 March 1917, he shared a victory with Joseph de Sevin. He scored a second time on 12 April. The next day, Nogues was shot down, probably by Albert Dossenbach of Jasta 36, and fell into the enemy's hands. It did not take him long to escape and rejoin his squadron. He was promoted from Maréchal-des-logis to Adjutant on 20 July 1917 and wounded by shrapnel on 13 August 1917.

Upon recovery, he was reassigned to Escadrille Spa 57 as a Spad pilot on 12 April 1918. Nogues was credited with downing an Albatros over Assainvillers on 2 May 1918. He steadily accumulated victories through May and June, mostly solo, though he shared one with Jean Alfred Fraissinet. On 4 July, for his ninth win, he shot down an enemy observation balloon, sharing the win with Andre Petit-Delchet; this victory brought him the Légion d'honneur. On 26 September 1918, Nogues became a balloon buster ace, downing his fifth gasbag for his thirteenth victory.

== Postwar ==
As the war ended, Nogues was transferred to Escadrille 172. Along with his other decorations, he had earned the Croix de Guerre with a minimum of five palmes.

On 5 October 1919, Marcel Nogues died several hours after receiving a blow to the larynx in a rugby match.

== Honors and awards ==
Nogues was awarded the French Legion of Honor in 1918.

== Bibliography ==
- Franks, Norman L. R.; Bailey, Frank W. (1992). Over the front : a complete record of the fighter aces and units of the United States and French Air Services, 1914-1918. London: Grub Street. ISBN 0-948817-54-2. OCLC 28223455.
