= Augereau =

Augereau is a French surname. Notable people with the surname include:

- Antoine Augereau (1485–1534), French type designer and printer
- Charles-Pierre Augereau (1757–1816), French military officer
- Fernand Augereau (1882–1958), French cyclist
- Raoul Augereau (1889–1940), French military officer
- Véronique Augereau (born 1957), French voice actress
