= Xavier Moissinac =

French World War I flying ace

Xavier Jean-Marie Louis Moissinac
- Born: 29 October 1896; Brive la Gaillarde, France
- Died: 3 June 1918 (aged 21); Celles-lès-Condé, France
- Military career
- Allegiance: France
- Branch: Aviation
- Rank: Maréchal-des-logis
- Unit: Escadrille 154
- Awards: Médaille militaire Croix de Guerre

Maréchal-des-logis Xavier Jean-Marie Louis Moissinac was a French World War I flying ace credited with seven aerial victories.

== Biography ==
Xavier Jean-Marie Louis Moissinac was born in Brive la Gaillarde, France on 29 October 1896.

Moissinac enlisted for a four year hitch on 11 October 1915, and was assigned to an artillery regiment. At his request, he was sent for pilot's training. On 23 May 1917, he was granted his Military Pilot's Brevet. The training program retained him as an instructor while he requested combat duty. On 5 September 1917 he was posted to Escadrille N.154.

He received a promotion to Maréchal des logis on 25 January 1918. On 1 April, he aided Auguste Lahoulle in shooting down a German observation balloon before he shot down an enemy airplane. He would shoot down a reconnaissance two-seater and another plane singly. Then, on 30 May 1918, he shared two more victories with Lahoulle, as well as shooting down a third plane the same day, bringing his total victories to seven confirmed and a probable.

Xavier Jean-Marie Louis Moissinac was killed in action over Celles-lès-Condé, France on 3 June 1918. On 30 June 1918, he was posthumously awarded the Médaille militaire:

"Remarkable pursuit pilot of intrepid bravery. He recently downed his fifth enemy plane with the aid of another pilot of his Escadrille. One wound. Three citations." Médaille Militaire citation, 30 June 1918

Moissinac also earned the Croix de Guerre.
