= Puybrun =

- Commune
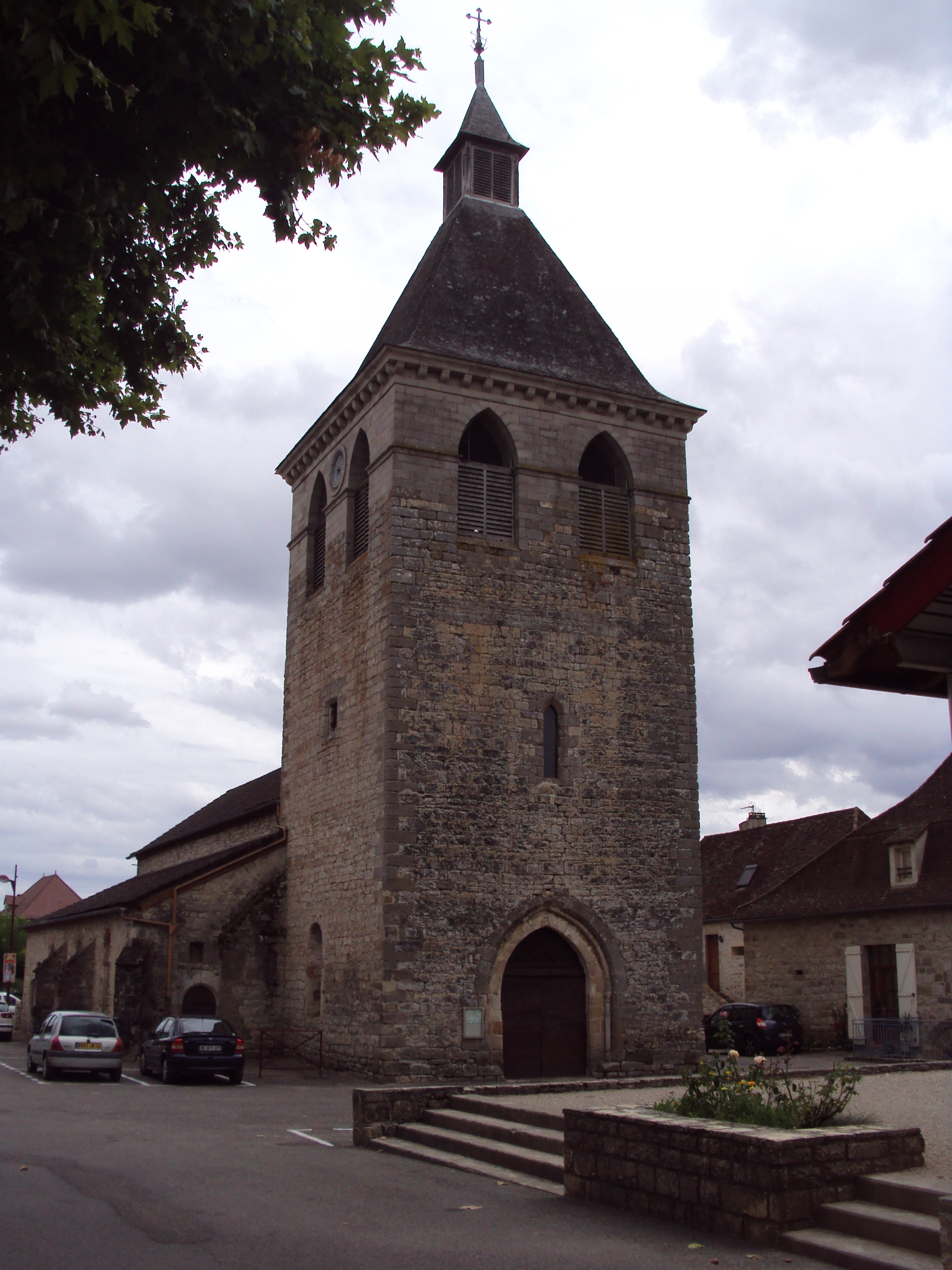
- The church of Saint-Blaise
- Location of Puybrun
- Location within France Location within Occitanie
- Coordinates: 44°55′10″N 1°47′16″E
- Country: France
- Region: Occitania
- Department: Lot
- Arrondissement: Figeac
- Canton: Cère et Ségala
- Intercommunality: Causses et Vallée de la Dordogne

Government
  - Mayor (2020–2026): Pascale Cieplak
- Area^{1}: 4.36 km^{2} (1.68 sq mi)
- Elevation: 155 m (509 ft)
- Highest elevation: 266 m (873 ft)
- Lowest elevation: 125 m (410 ft)
- Population (2023): 984
  - Density: 226/km^{2} (585/sq mi)
- Time zone: UTC+01:00 (CET)
  - Summer (DST): UTC+02:00 (CEST)
- INSEE/Postal code: 46229 /46130
- ^{1} French Land Register data, which excludes lakes, ponds, glaciers > 1 km^{2} (0.386 sq mi or 247 acres) and river estuaries.

Puybrun (French pronunciation: [pɥibʁœ̃]; Occitan: Puègbrun) is a commune in the Lot department in south-western France.

== Toponymy ==
The toponym Puybrun (in Occitan Pègbrun) is found in the form Bastida de Podio bruni which is formed from Puy which is a francization of the Occitan pèg, pech from the Latin podium with the meaning of place located on a height and brown because of the colour given by the iron ore.

== History ==
In 1282, a bastide was founded at Puybrun by Philipe de Hardi and William IV, a cistercian Abbot of Dalon in the Perigord. A paréage had been created between the two in 1279. The bastide was not granted the right to build walls and ditches. The bastide would be attacked by the English during the Hundred Years' War against the French and again by Protestants during the French Wars of Religion in 1562 and again 1585.

== Local culture and heritage ==
=== Places and monuments ===
- Église Saint-Blaise de Puybrun. Built in 1300s but rebuilt in between 1600 and 1620 as it was severely damaged during the Religious Wars.

=== Notable persons ===
- Charles Nuville (1889-1965), aviator, ace of the First World War, born in Puybrun.
- Jacky Lamothe, born in Puybrun in 1950, international basketball player.

== See also ==
- Communes of the Lot department
