= Escadrille SPA.57 =

WWI French Air Force unit (1915)

Escadrille MS 57 – N 57 – SPA 57 - 57S
- Active: May 1915
- Country: France
- Branch: French Air Service
- Type: Training Squadron
- Garrison/HQ: BAN Landivisiau
- Mascot: Seagull
- Engagements: World War I

Escadrille MS 57 (Squadron Morane-Saulnier 57) of the French Air Force was founded during World War I, on 10 May 1915. They were reformed in 1953 as part of the French Navy Aéronavale, and known as Escadrille 57S. They transitioned from the Falcon 10MER aircraft to the Pilatus PC-24 in 2026 and are a training squadron based at Base d'aéronautique navale de Landivisiau (BAN Landivisiau).

== History ==
Stood up by Captain Alfred Zappelli, Escadrille MS 57 was initially attached to the 10th Army, flying Morane-Saulnier Type L & Type LAs in the vicinity of Arras. Zappelli would be transferred to MS 46 on 8 September 1915 with Capt Edouard Duseigneur taking command of the squadron. Duseigneur had transferred from the 16th Dragoons where he trained and flew the Nieuport 10, and thus changed the squadron naming per French custom at the time to N 57 (for Nieuport). The squadron were first cited in orders as N 57 on 24 October 1915.

On 16 March 1916, the squadron moved to the front lines near Verdun. It would remain there until incorporated into Groupe de Combat 11 on 1 November 1916. The squadron served with GC 11 through war's end.

On 24 May 1917, the squadron was again cited, for having destroyed 20 enemy aircraft and six observation balloons. This second citation entitled members of the unit to wear the fourragere of the Croix de Guerre. The arrival of SPADs late in 1917 changed the unit's name again to SPA 57.

Closely following the war's end, SPA 57 was once again cited for its efforts. It was credited with the destruction of 65 enemy aircraft and 14 observation balloons.

With the end of the war, the French Army would take the opportunity to reorganize its aviation divisions, absorbing the elements of SPA 57 into the 7th squadron of the 2e regiment d'aviation de chasse (2è RAC) out of Strasbourg. The 2è RAC would again be absorbed by GC 11 in 1933, becoming its 4th squadron, seeing combat again in the Battle of France until finally disbanded on August 20, 1940.

With France's last ditch effort to retain French Indochina and tensions rising in Algeria, Escadrille 57S was reformed on 1 June 1953 at BAN Lartigue in Algeria as an Aéronavale training squadron flying North American T-6 Texans and Grumman F6F Hellcats.

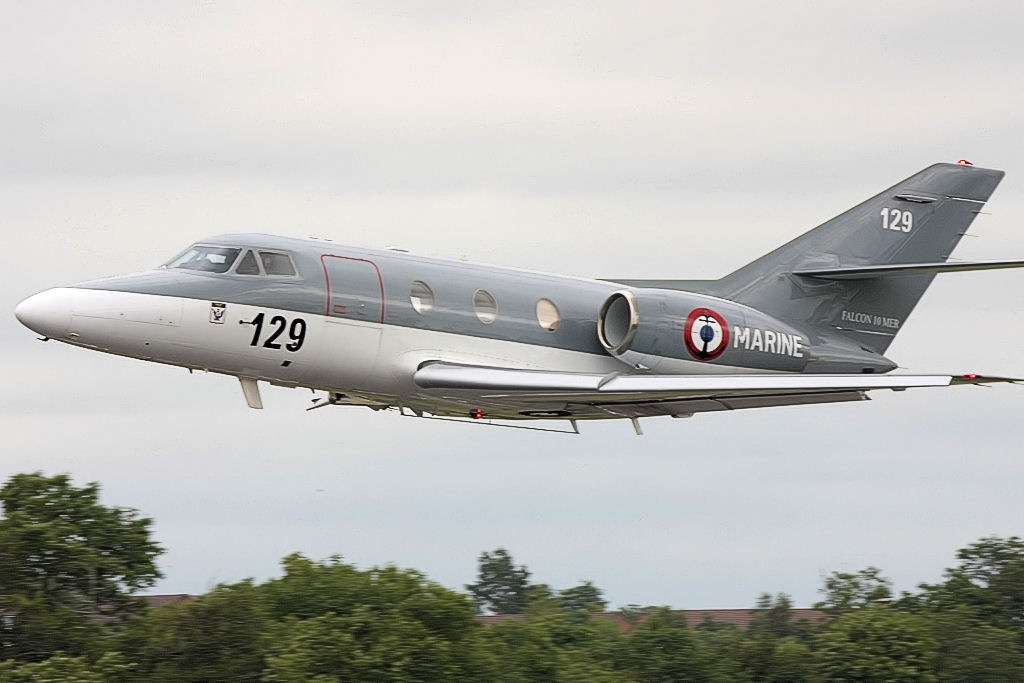
Esc 57S Falcon 10 MER, RIAT 2008

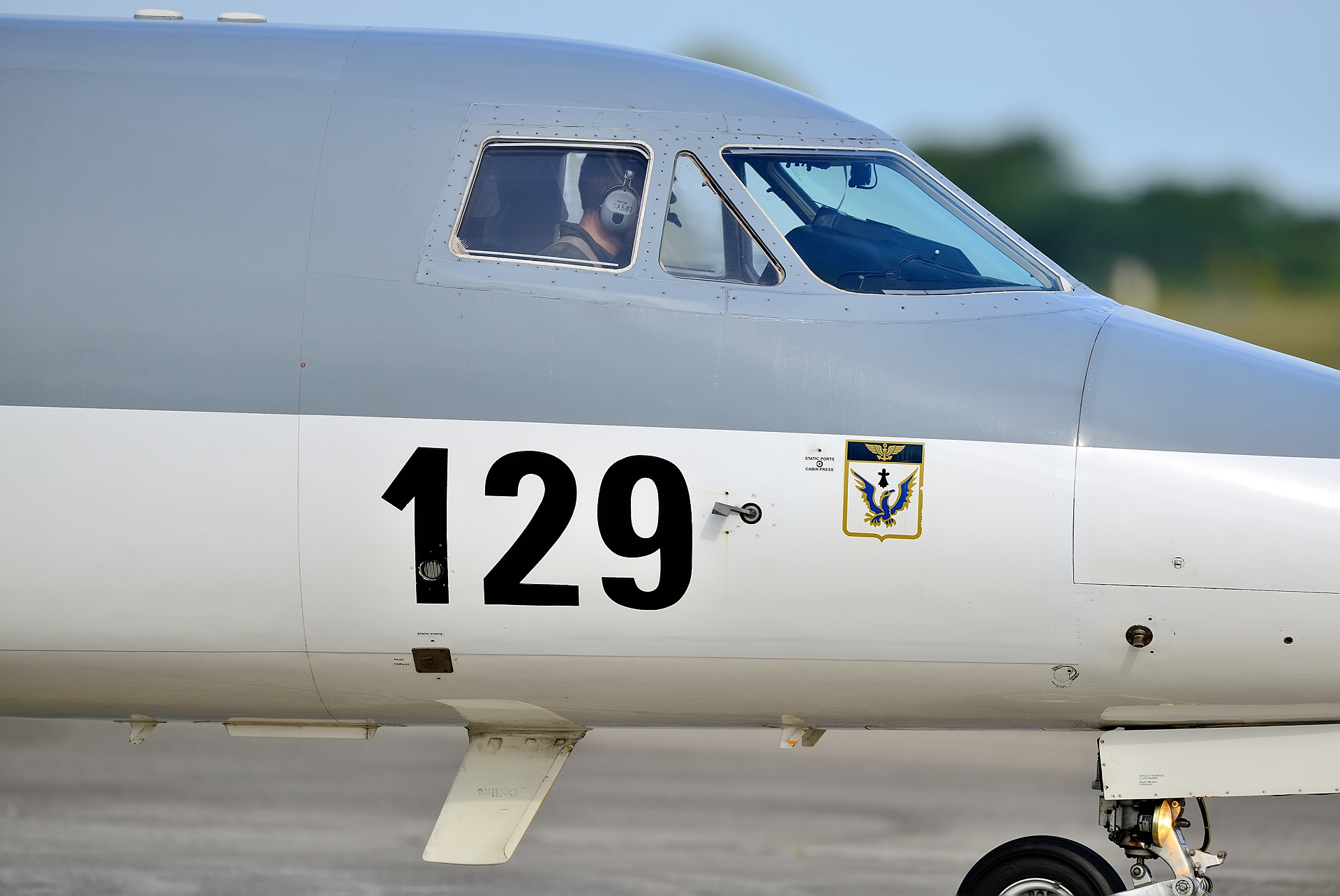
The emblem of 57S on the nose of Falcon 10 MER serial no.129

The Hellcats were replaced with Vought F4U Corsairs in 1959, and the squadron entered the jet age with the Fouga CM.175 Zéphyr in 1961. The squadron was again stood down in 1962 with end of the Algerian War.

Lieutenant Guy Baillot stood the training squadron up once again at BAN Landivisiau on 1 September 1981, with the Morane-Saulnier MS.760 Paris and earlier models of the Dassault Falcon 10 which were flown until 2026.

== Coat of Arms ==
It's unclear when it was first adopted, but the squadron used a charging wild boar as its blason as early as Capt Duseigneur's command. When the then squadron commander, Lt Jean Chaput, an ace with 16 certified kills was shot down on 6 May 1918, the squadron changed its blason for Chaput's personal insignia, a seagull in flight with outstretched wings.

== Commanding officers ==
- Capitaine Alfred Zappelli: 10 May 1915 – 7 September 1915
- Capitaine Edouard Duseigneur: 8 September 1915 – 10 March 1917
- Lieutenant Georges Herbulot: 10 March 1917 – 11 April 1918
- Lieutenant Jean Chaput: 11 April 1918 – KIA 6 May 1918
- Lieutenant Jacques Ortoli: 10 May 1918 -
- Lieutenant Guy Baillot: 1 September 1981 - 5 September 1983

== Notable personnel ==
- Lieutenant Jean Chaput
- Sous lieutenant Charles Nuville
- Sous lieutenant Marcel Nogues
- Lieutenant Jean Alfred Fraissinet
- Sous lieutenant Marius Hasdenteufel
- Aspirant Jean Dubois de Gennes
- Adjutant Andre Petit-Delchet

== Aircraft assigned ==
- Pilatus PC-24 from 2026

=== Former aircraft ===
- Morane-Saulnier Type L & Type LA - 10 May 1915
- Nieuport 10: September 1915
- SPAD: Late 1917
- North American SNJ 1953-1962
- Grumman F6F Hellcat 1953-1959
- Vought F4U Corsair 1959-1962
- Fouga CM.175 Zéphyr 1961-1962
- Morane-Saulnier MS.760 Paris 1981-1997
- Falcon 10MER 1981-2026
