= Henri Languedoc =

French World War I flying ace

Henri François Languedoc
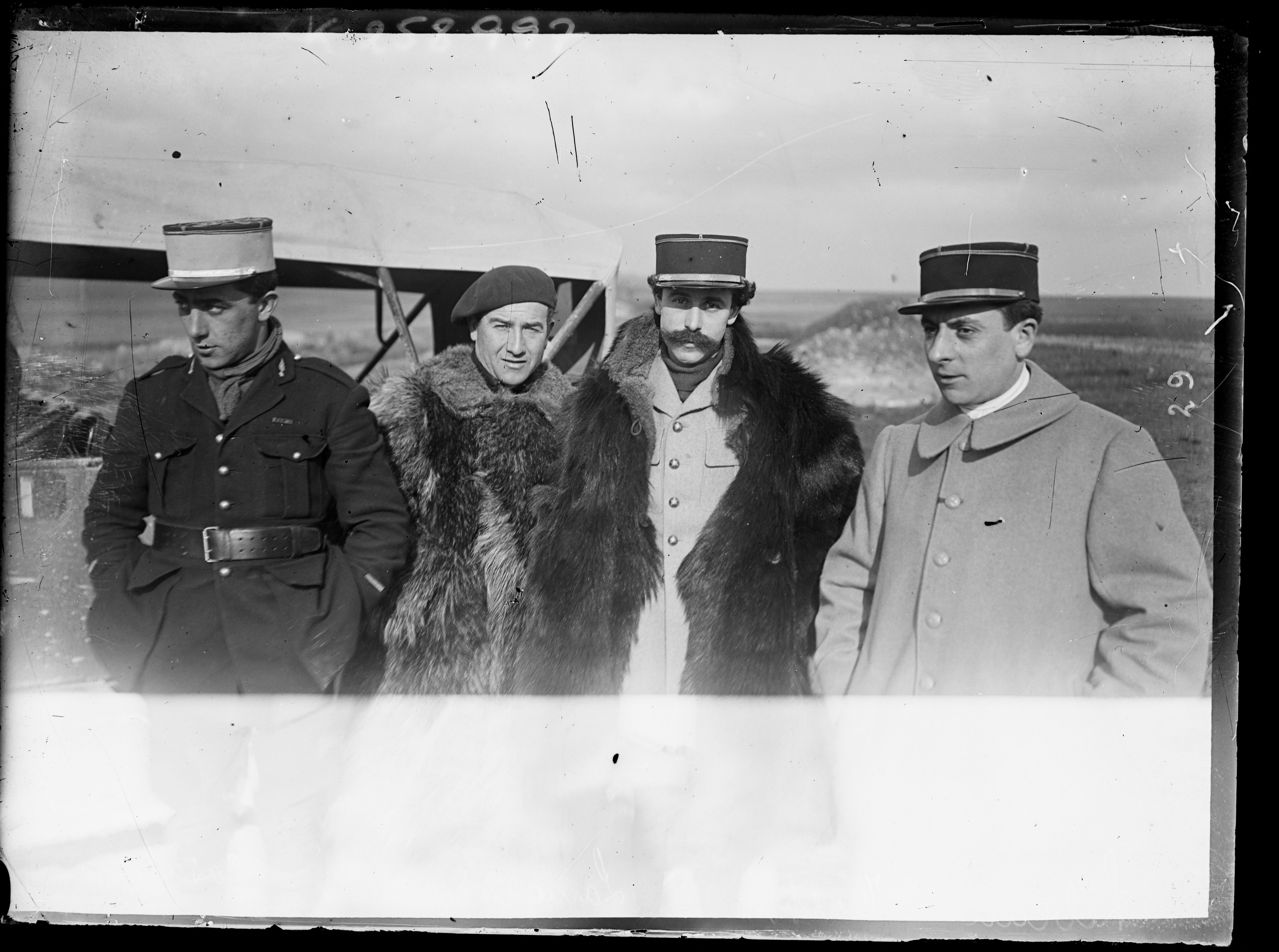
- Second from left
- Born: 5 October 1885; Seraincourt, Val-d'Oise, France
- Died: 18 July 1917 (aged 31)
- Military career
- Allegiance: France
- Branch: Cavalry; infantry; aviation
- Service years: 1903 - 1917
- Rank: Sous lieutenant
- Unit: Escadrille 12
- Awards: Legion d'Honneur; Croix de Guerre

Sous lieutenant Henri François Languedoc was a French World War I flying ace credited with seven aerial victories.

== Biography ==
See also Aerial victory standards of World War I

Henri François Languedoc was born in Seraincourt, Val-d'Oise, France on 5 October 1885.

Languedoc originally served in the ground forces, enlisting in the cavalry on 21 October 1903. He was promoted to sous lieutenant and transferred into the infantry on 21 March 1915. After being wounded so severely he was invalided from ground service, he joined the flying service on 10 January 1916. On 31 March, he completed pilot's training. He was then assigned to Escadrille N.12 as a Nieuport pilot. On 23 October 1916, he scored his first aerial victory. He would not score again until 23 January 1917, then strung five more victories out until 21 April 1917.

Langeduoc was awarded the Legion d'honneur on 6 January 1917. Previous decorations for service in the ground forces as well as aviation included the Croix de Guerre with six palmes, two etoiles de argent, and an etoile de bronze.

Languedoc would be mortally wounded on 16 July 1917, and die two days later.
