= Compagnie Fraissinet =

Marseilles-based shipping line

Compagnie Fraissinet house flag

The Compagnie Fraissinet, a Marseilles-based shipping line, played an important role in trade and immigration flows in the Mediterranean, Black Sea, Western Africa and Latin America. The Compagnie Fraissinet added Northern America (New York NY, Providence RI, Chicago IL, Cleveland OH, Detroit MI and Montreal Quebec) to its routes after a merger with the Compagnie Française de Navigation à Vapeur Cyprien Fabre & Cie (Fabre Line). The Compagnie Fraissinet operated for close to 150 years through two World Wars, several revolutions, and the colonization and decolonization periods. The Fraissinet family started divesting from shipping activities in the 60s to concentrate on aviation and media. Fraissinet lowered its flag in 1968, the tanker Alfred-Fraissinet being the last ship of the company. Fabre kept on operating until 1979.

== Origin ==
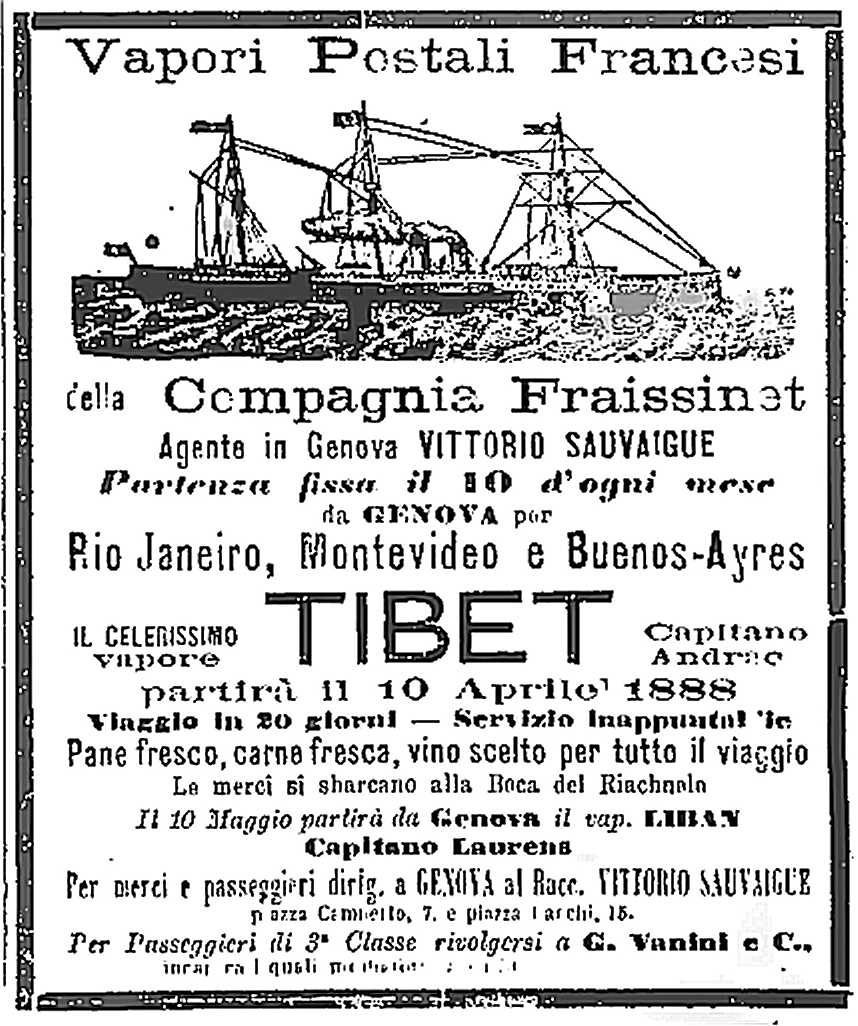
1888 advertisement for the company

Compagnie Fraissinet was founded in January 1836 in Marseilles by Marc Fraissinet, the son of a Protestant merchant from Languedoc. Fraissinet's first ship was the Marseillais. In 1837, two new ships were built, Rhône and Hérault. In 1841, Fraissinet bought the company and extended the line to Nice. Initially supported by the French government, Fraissinet's project of a line to New York and the Gulf of Mexico eventually aborted. In 1846, Fraissinet appointed his son Adolphe as deputy director of the company; the lines were extended to Spain, Gibraltar and Portugal.

The company was renamed Compagnie Marseillaise de Navigation à Vapeur in 1853. Isabelle, the first screw-propelled vessel of the company, inaugurated the next year the first scheduled line between Algeria and Le Havre (Marseilles-Algiers-Spain-Portugal-Le Havre). The short-lived line was suppressed after the collision of Normandie with a Dutch ship in 1857.

In 1860 the company, operating ten vessels, had to face an increased competition on the Italian market. Fraissinet extended his lines to Naples and Levant, increased the capital of the company and purchased six new ships in 1865. The same year, Fraissinet purchased Bazin, the first steamship company founded in Marseilles. One year later, the Fraissinet company had a capital of 9 millions francs and operated 15 steamers. Scheduled lines with Corsica and Leghorn were established in 1868. Asie, heading to India, was the first merchant vessel to sail on the Suez Canal (8 January 1870). In 1870, Fraissinet owned 20 vessels, operating scheduled lines to Bombay, Malta, Port Said, Constantinople, Italy, Corsica and Languedoc. Due to the Franco-Prussian war, the service to India was suppressed, the service to Corsica was postponed and several ships were sold.

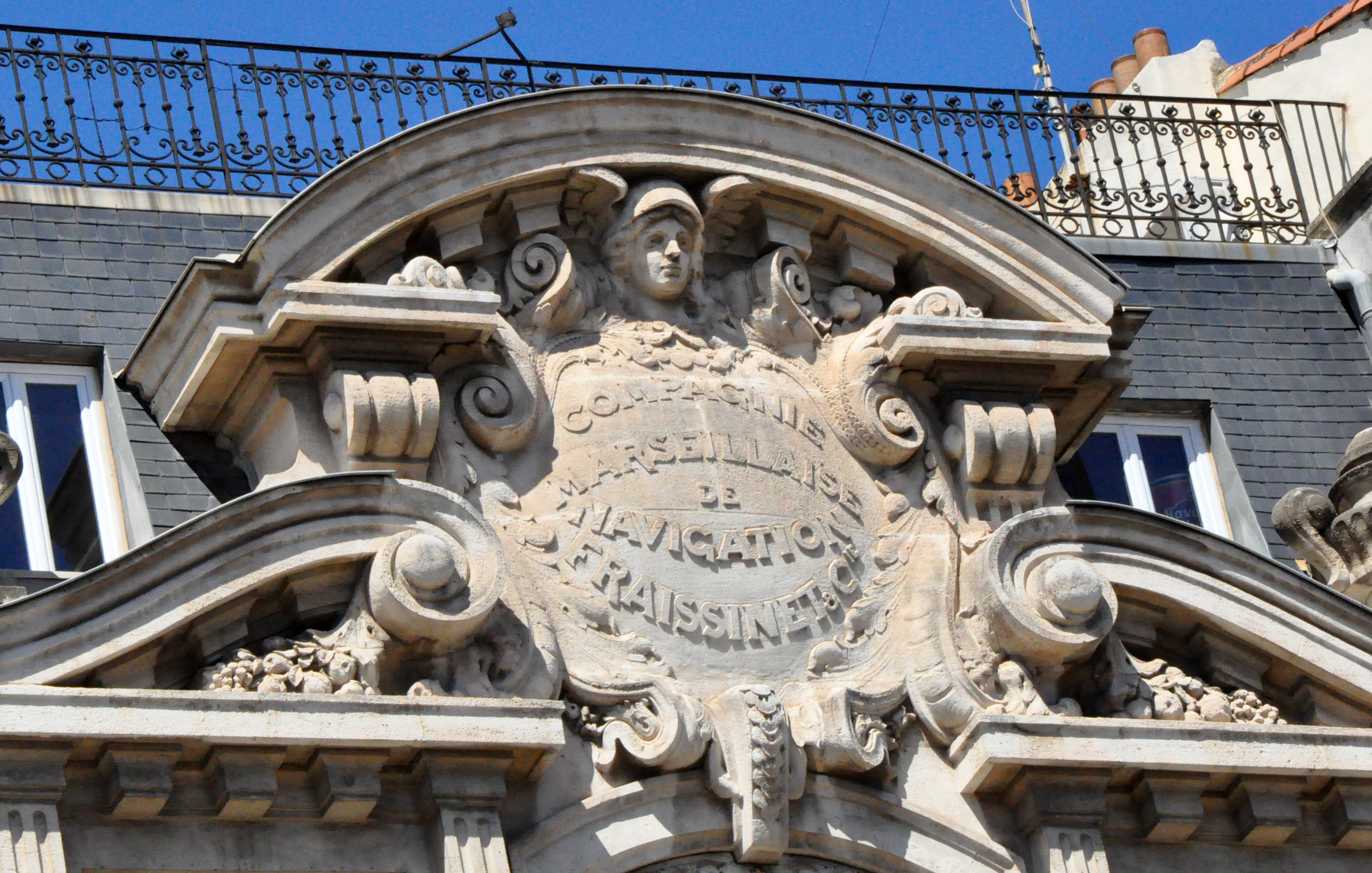
Pediment of the former company's office in Marseille

Fraissinet resurfaced in 1874 as Nouvelle Société Maritime de Navigation à Vapeur (Compagnie Fraissinet). The company was granted the postal service to Corsica by the French government. In 1878, a line was established between Sète and Genoa, while the existing Levant lines was extended to Palestine and Odessa. On 18 December 1878, the Byzantin sunk off Gallipoli, causing the death of c. 150 of the 250 passengers of the ship. In 1889, Fraissinet was granted the postal service to West Africa and Congo. The Corsican company Morelli (five ships) was taken over by Fraissinet in 1892.

At the end of the 19th century, Fraissinet operated lines to Languedoc, Corsica (postal service), Sardinia, Italy, the French and Italian Rivieras, Constantinople, the Black Sea and the mouth of Danube, Oran, Dakar and Libreville (postal service). On 7 June 1903, Liban collided with L'Insulaire a few miles off the port of Marseilles, causing the death of c. 100. The accident deeply afflicted the town of Marseilles and a violent press campaign broke up against Fraissinet, which lost the postal service to Corsica in 1904. However, Compagnie Française de Navigation et de Construction Navale could not fulfill the contract, which was retroceded to Fraissinet in 1905.

The Fraissinet fleet was decreased to ten ships after the First World War. Balkan (August 1918), Suzette-Fraissinet (May 1918), Marc-Fraissinet (October 1917), Esterel (April 1917), Golo (August 1917) and Italia (May 1917) were sunk by German or Austro-Hungarian U-boats. Alfred Fraissinet reorganized the company, favouring the Corsican and Algerian lines. In 1927, the postal contract to Corsica was extended for 20 years; a new series of modern ships was built: Cap-Corse, Ville-d'Ajaccio, Cyrnos, Île-de-Beauté, Pascal-Paoli.

== Fraissinet and Fabre ==
The marriage of Jean Alfred Fraissinet with Mathilde Cyprien Fabre changed Compagnie Fraissinet's strategy. The Fabre family, originating from La Ciotat, was involved in trade and shipping in the Mediterranean Sea and to the West and East Indies since the 15th century. Cyprien Fabre (1838–1896) founded in 1868 the Société Cyprien Fabre et Cie; he bought a few sailing ships for the service of his trade posts in West Africa. Interested in steam navigation, which was still controversial at the time, Fabre purchased in the next ten years one paddle ship and ten screw-propelled ships. The company developed its African line and tramping, as well as a scheduled line to Algeria via Spain. In 1879, an attempt to open a transatlantic line failed but a scheduled line was opened between Marseilles and Liverpool.

In 1881, Fabre founded the Compagnie Française de Navigation à Vapeur Cyprien Fabre & Cie and was elected unanimously President of the Chamber of Commerce of Marseilles. Using the subsidies granted by the new French law on shipping, he bought 12 ships in four years, mostly from English shipyards. In 1885, the company operated 16 steamships to Middle East, Algeria, Brazil and Argentina (specifically, for the transport of Portuguese and Italian emigrants, 1882–1905), New York and New Orleans, West Africa (line extended in 1902 to Lagos, Nigeria). Fabre was also involved in the transport of fishers from Saint-Malo to Newfoundland (1887–1906), of pilgrims to Mecca, and of troops to China and Madagascar. When Fabre died in 1896, the company's fleet represented 10% of the commercial ships registered in Marseilles. Internationally, the company was known as the Fabre Line, a 'trademark' that would be painted in white letters on the hull of the liners of the company after the Second World War.

In 1914, Fabre owned 11 ships, including eight liners. Sant'Anna, commissioned for the transport of troops, was torpedoed in 1918 near Bizerte (Tunisia) with 2,000 passengers. The company lost another three vessels, Libia, Provincia and Liberia. At the end of the war, Fabre reorganized its fleet. Suppressed in 1914, the Middle East line was re-established in 1921 as the Marseilles – Genoa – Syria – Egypt – New York line. Agencies were created in several Mediterranean countries in order to promote leisure cruises. Transatlantic cargo-passenger lines were reorganized via Portugal and Italy, while the African lines were extended to Douala (Cameroon) and Pointe-Noire (Congo). Alliances with the other companies in Marseilles were deemed necessary. Fabre first set up joint agencies with Fraissinet. In 1927, the company took a majority stake in Chargeurs Réunis. The company was renamed Compagnie Générale de Navigation à Vapeur Cyprien Fabre & Cie in 1933.

== The result of the Fraissinet Fabre merger ==
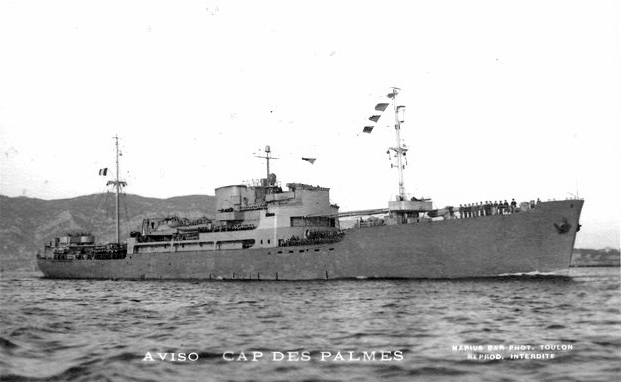
Cap des Palmes, launched in 1935, was requisitioned in 1939 and converted into an aviso.

In 1930, Fraissinet set up an alliance with Fabre and Chargeurs Réunis for a joint service to western Africa. The lines to the Black Sea, suffering from the Italian competition, was suppressed in 1931 after 50 years of uninterrupted service (including during wartime). In 1931, the Italian government decided a monopoly on the transport of emigrants, which resulted in the suppression of the Fabre line to America. Fabre transferred unused liners to the Messageries Maritimes or reallocated them to the African line. New lines were opened with Fraissinet for the transport of African fruit to France. In 1937, Fraissinet took the control of Fabre, which had abandoned Chargeurs, and set up an alliance with Paquet for a while. This was the only period during which the three big family companies from Marseilles sailed together.

When the Second World War broke out, most activity of Fabre was concentrated in Africa, with a rapid postal line, a commercial line resupplying Morocco and Algeria and shipping back their products to France, and fruit lines with specific ships mostly dedicated to the transport of bananas. In 1941, the company was renamed Compagnie de Navigation Cyprien Fabre & Cie. Some ships were lost during the Second World War, whereas the remaining ones had become obsolete. The Second World War caused a great damage to the Compagnie Fraissinet. One of the few ships left by the Germans to the French merchant navy, MS Général-Bonaparte, was sunk off Corsica by a British submarine on 19 May 1943.

== After World War II ==
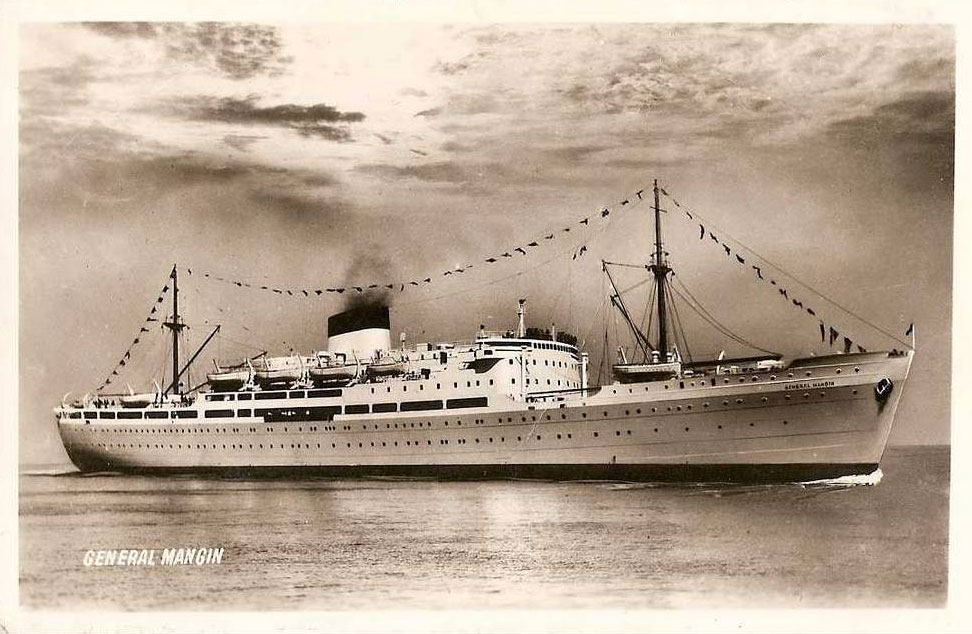
Passenger ship Général Mangin, launched in 1953

After the war transatlantic lines were re-established, serving New York and the Gulf of Mexico, and, from 1950, Canada and the Great Lakes. In 1954 new transatlantic lines were established from Le Havre, Bordeaux and Brest.

In 1955, Fabre completed the merger with Fraissinet by forming the Compagnie de Navigation Fraissinet et Cyprien Fabre, directed by Roland Fraissinet, Cyprien Fabre's grandson. Maintained under the Fabre house flag, the traditional Fabre lines were complemented with lines from the other partners of the new company: a fruit line to West Africa, occasionally to Reunion, Indian and Pacific Ocean; a container line to the US, occasionally to the Great Lakes; a cargo line to the Gulf of Mexico; a line to the Antilles and Guyana (originally a SGTM line); and a line to Morocco (originally a Paquet line). In 1959, they founded Compagnie Ivoirienne de Consignation Maritime and placed two ships under the flag of Côte-d'Ivoire. Fraissinet lowered its flag in 1968, the tanker Alfred-Fraissinet being the last ship of the company. Fabre kept on operating until 1979. In 1970, the company owned 16 ships. The company eventually lowered its flag and sold its last cargo ships, MS Joliette and MS Frontenac, in 1979.
