= Pierre Dufaur de Gavardie =

French flying ace (1890–1966)

- Born: Pierre Henri Edmond Dufaur de Gavardie; 20 January 1890; Rouen, France
- Died: 4 October 1966 (aged 76)
- Military career
- Allegiance: France
- Branch: Aviation
- Rank: Lieutenant
- Units: Escadrille 53; Escadrille 12
- Awards: Légion d'honneur Médaille militaire Croix de Guerre

Lieutenant Pierre Henri Edmond Dufaur de Gavardie (20 January 1890 – 4 October 1966) was a World War I flying ace credited with six aerial victories. Dufaur de Gavardie was wounded in action on 7 February 1917. He died on 4 October 1966 at the age of 76.

== Biography ==
Pierre Henri Edmond Dufaur de Gavardie was born in Rouen, France on 20 January 1890. On 30 August 1914, he volunteered to serve in the French military for the duration of hostilities. He began World War I as an artilleryman, but transferred to aviation duty with Escadrille 53.

Details of his pilot's training are unknown, but he was posted to Escadrille 12 on 6 February 1916 and promoted to Adjutant the next day. He shot down a German airplane on 8 March 1916. On 12 April 1916, he was awarded the Médaille Militaire for his valorous service. Over the next seven months, he would shoot down three more airplanes, as well as two observation balloons, with his final victory on 9 November 1916. On 6 January 1917, he was inducted into the Legion d'honneur. A month later, on 7 February 1917, Dufaur de Gavardie was so badly wounded that he had to be medically evacuated. On 30 August 1917, while still on sick leave, he was commissioned as a Sous lieutenant. By 1 February 1918, he had recuperated enough to return to duty. No longer fit to fly, he was given an administrative job at a flying school.

Besides the above decorations, he also won the Croix de Guerre with seven palmes and an etoile de vermeil.

Pierre Henri Edmond Dufaur de Gavardie died on 4 October 1966.
