= Cormicy =

- Commune
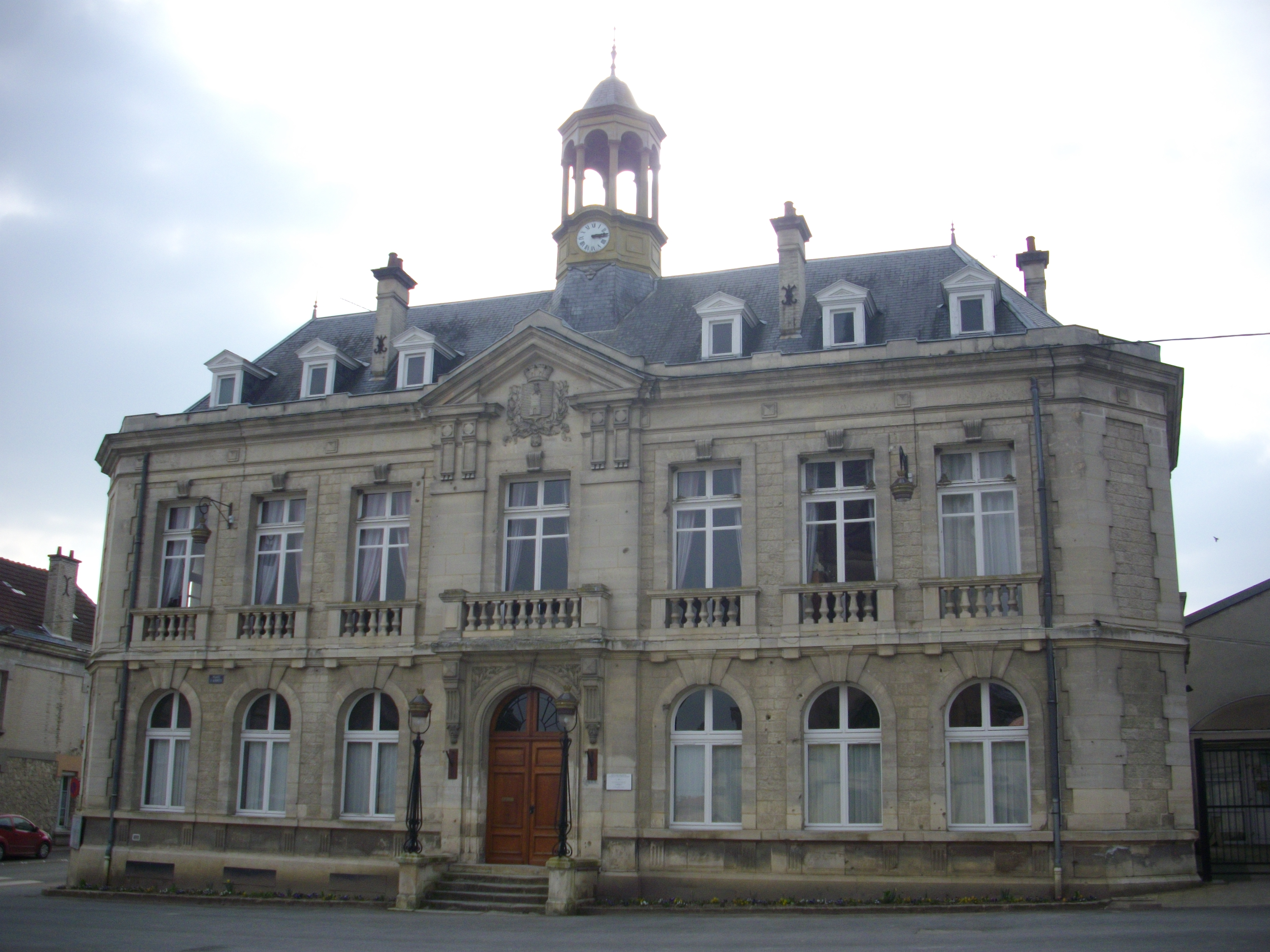
- The town hall in Cormicy

- Coat of arms
- Location of Cormicy
- Location within France Location within Grand Est
- Coordinates: 49°22′20″N 3°53′47″E
- Country: France
- Region: Grand Est
- Department: Marne
- Arrondissement: Reims
- Canton: Bourgogne-Fresne
- Intercommunality: CU Grand Reims

Government
  - Mayor (2022–2026): Chantal Lantenois
- Area^{1}: 31.74 km^{2} (12.25 sq mi)
- Elevation: 84 m (276 ft)
- Population (2023): 1,500
  - Density: 47/km^{2} (120/sq mi)
- Time zone: UTC+01:00 (CET)
  - Summer (DST): UTC+02:00 (CEST)
- INSEE/Postal code: 51171 /51220
- ^{1} French Land Register data, which excludes lakes, ponds, glaciers > 1 km^{2} (0.386 sq mi or 247 acres) and river estuaries.

Cormicy (French pronunciation: [kɔʁmisi]) is a commune in the Marne department in north-eastern France. On 1 January 2017, the former commune of Gernicourt was merged into Cormicy.

== See also ==
- Communes of the Marne department
