= Celles-lès-Condé =

Commune in France

- Commune
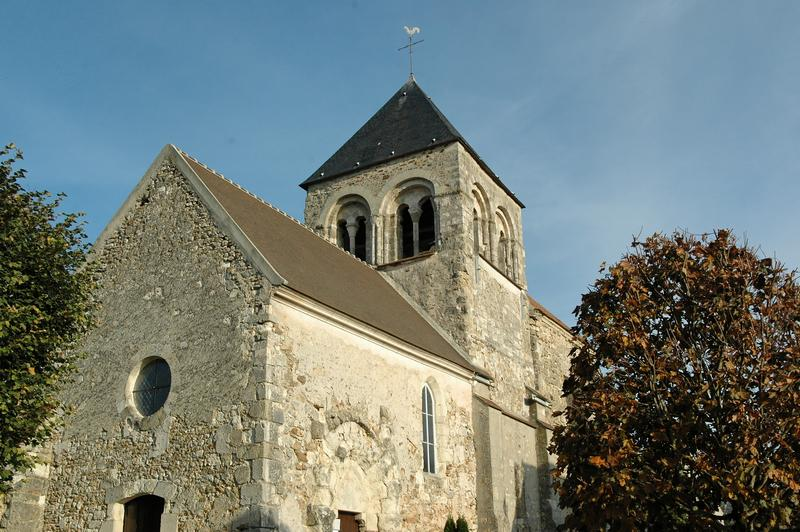
- The church of Celles-lès-Condé
- Location of Celles-lès-Condé
- Location within France Location within Hauts-de-France
- Coordinates: 49°00′45″N 3°34′20″E
- Country: France
- Region: Hauts-de-France
- Department: Aisne
- Arrondissement: Château-Thierry
- Canton: Essômes-sur-Marne
- Intercommunality: CA Région de Château-Thierry

Government
  - Mayor (2026–32): Jordane Beauchard
- Area^{1}: 3.91 km^{2} (1.51 sq mi)
- Elevation: 85 m (279 ft)
- Highest elevation: 223 m (732 ft)
- Lowest elevation: 76 m (249 ft)
- Population (2023): 88
  - Density: 23/km^{2} (58/sq mi)
- Time zone: UTC+01:00 (CET)
  - Summer (DST): UTC+02:00 (CEST)
- INSEE/Postal code: 02146 /02330
- ^{1} French Land Register data, which excludes lakes, ponds, glaciers > 1 km^{2} (0.386 sq mi or 247 acres) and river estuaries.

Celles-lès-Condé (French pronunciation: [sɛl lɛ kɔ̃de], literally Celles near Condé) is a commune in the Aisne department and Hauts-de-France region of northern France.

== Population ==
Historical population
Year	Pop.	±% p.a.
1968	86	—
1975	93	+1.12%
1982	90	−0.47%
1990	78	−1.77%
1999	77	−0.14%
2007	76	−0.16%
2012	80	+1.03%
2017	87	+1.69%
2023	88	+0.19%
Source: INSEE

== See also ==
- Communes of the Aisne department
