= Seraincourt, Val-d'Oise =

Seraincourt
- Commune
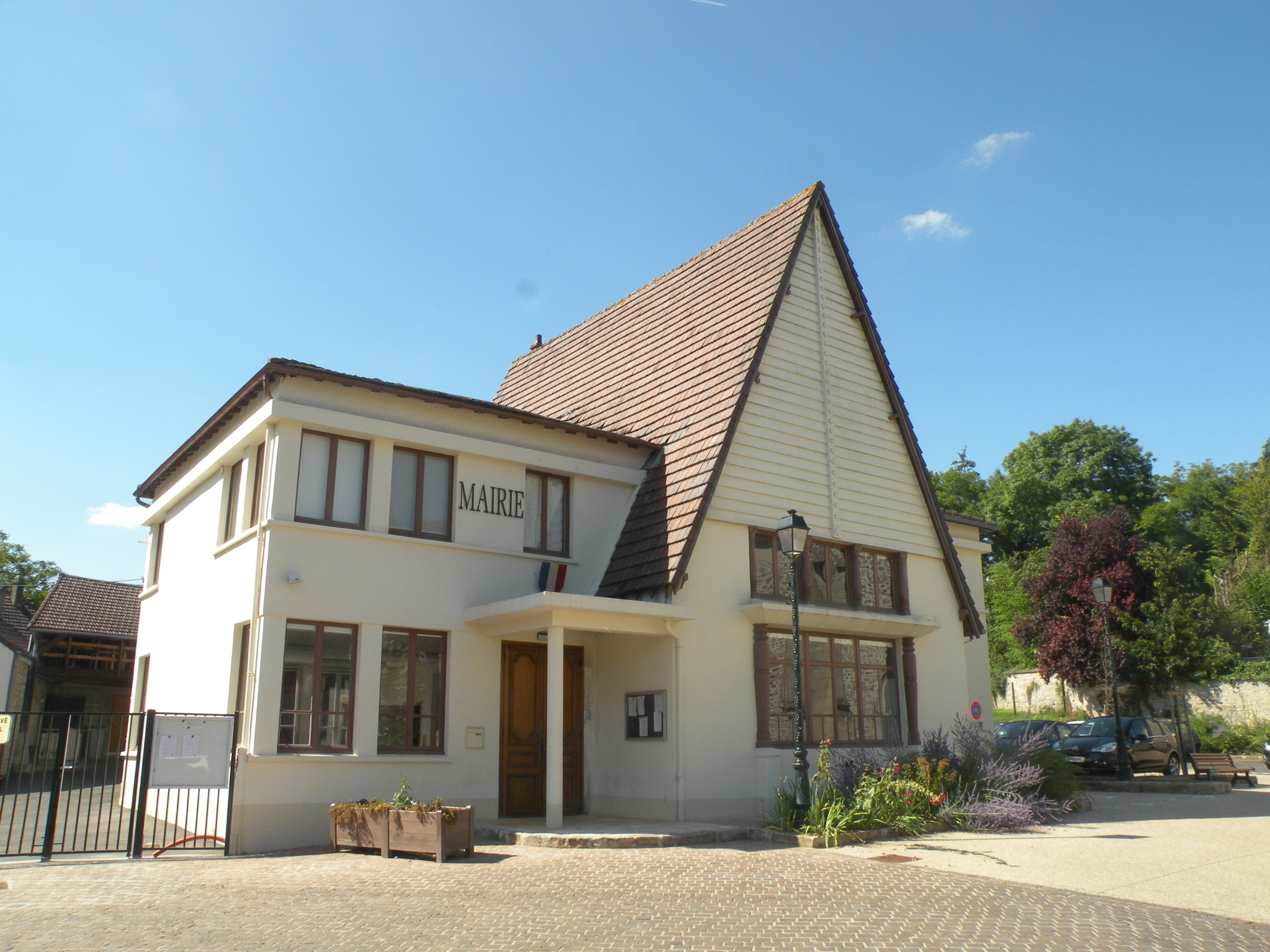
- The town hall of Seraincourt

- Coat of arms
- Location of Seraincourt
- Location within France Location within Île-de-France (region)
- Coordinates: 49°02′10″N 1°52′06″E
- Country: France
- Region: Île-de-France
- Department: Val-d'Oise
- Arrondissement: Pontoise
- Canton: Vauréal

Government
  - Mayor (2020–2026): Anne-Marie Maurice
- Area^{1}: 11.28 km^{2} (4.36 sq mi)
- Highest elevation: 124 m (407 ft)
- Lowest elevation: 26 m (85 ft)
- Population (2023): 1,305
  - Density: 115.7/km^{2} (299.6/sq mi)
- Time zone: UTC+01:00 (CET)
  - Summer (DST): UTC+02:00 (CEST)
- INSEE/Postal code: 95592 /95450
- ^{1} French Land Register data, which excludes lakes, ponds, glaciers > 1 km^{2} (0.386 sq mi or 247 acres) and river estuaries.

Seraincourt (French pronunciation: [səʁɛ̃kuʁ]) is a commune in the Val-d'Oise department in Île-de-France in northern France.

== See also ==
- Communes of the Val-d'Oise department
