= Jean Chaput =

French World War I flying ace

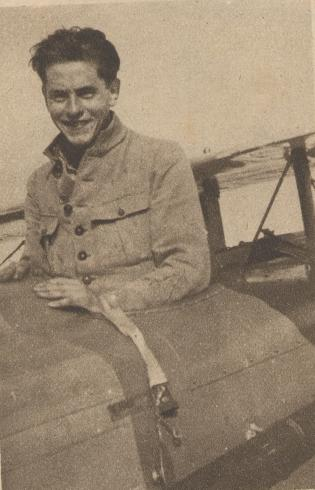
- Born: 17 September 1893; Paris, France
- Died: 6 May 1918 (aged 24); In the vicinity of Montdidier, Somme
- Military career
- Allegiance: France
- Branch: Infantry; aviation
- Service years: 1913–1918
- Rank: Lieutenant
- Units: Escadrille 28, Escadrille 57
- Commands: Escadrille 57
- Awards: Chevalier de Légion d'honneur, Médaille militaire, Croix de Guerre, British Military Cross

Lieutenant Jean Chaput was a French World War I flying ace credited with 16 aerial victories.

== Biography ==
Jean Marc Chaput was born on 17 September 1893 in Paris.

He served in the army infantry beginning in 1913. He transferred to aviation in 1914. He qualified as a pilot by February 1915, was assigned to Escadrille 28, and scored his first victory on 12 June 1915 while piloting a Caudron. He was awarded the Médaille militaire for this action. Three days later, he was wounded. On 10 July, he suffered the first of two serious wounds that would cause lengthy interruptions in his flying career. He did not return to duty until January 1916. Having risen through the enlisted ranks to sergeant, he was now commissioned a lieutenant in March 1916. He scored twice more, on 18 March and 30 April; then he was transferred to a fighter squadron, Escadrille 57, in May 1916. Between 22 May and 23 July, he downed an observation balloon and four German airplanes. On 24 August, he was again severely wounded; this time, he would not return to duty until early 1917. He scored a double victory on 5 April, and one each in May and June 1917; the latter was shared with Joseph M. X. de Sévin. There was another lapse in his winning ways, until 23 March 1918, when he once again scored twice; one of his victims that day was Erich Thomas. In April, he succeeded to command of Escadrille 57, and scored his two final victories. He was killed in action on 6 May 1918 by Hermann Becker.

== Honors and awards ==
Médaille militaire citation, 23 June 1915

Médaille militaire

"Sergent pilot of Escadrille C28. A pilot of extraordinary skill, courage, sang-froid, and devotion, Recently experienced, other than service in artillery reconnaissance, very efficient service in aerial pursuit. Never hesitated on several occasions, during the operations from 7 to 13 June 1915, to give pursuit to enemy planes better armed than himself. Returned on the 12th [June] with his plane riddled by machine gun bullets after having forced his adversary to land."

Chevalier de la Légion d'honneur citation, 4 June 1916

Chevalier de la Légion d'honneur

"Temporary Sous Lieutenant of Escadrille N57. Pilot of admirable audacity and sang-froid. ...downed four German planes. On 12 June 1915; 18 March, 30 April and 22 May 1916. Already cited four times in orders."

Chaput was awarded the Belgian Croix de guerre on 13 September 1917 and the British Military Cross on 17 April 1918. He also won multiple awards of his native France's Croix de Guerre.

== Sources of information ==
Preceded by Charles Nungesser	Top Flying Ace; France, World War I	Succeeded by Maxime Lenoir
