= Gernicourt =

- Part of Cormicy
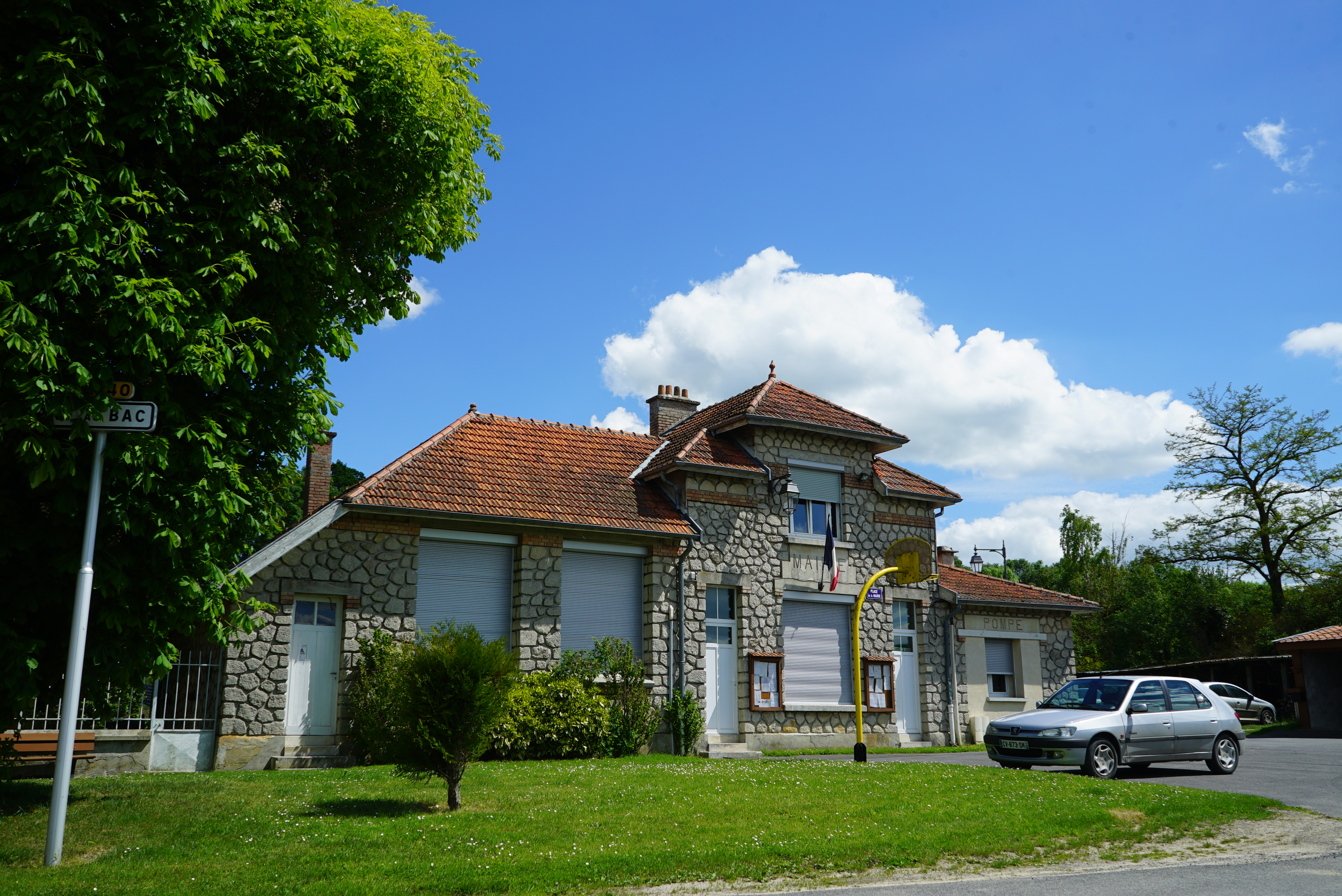
- Town hall
- Location of Gernicourt
- Location within France Location within Grand Est
- Coordinates: 49°24′02″N 3°52′25″E
- Country: France
- Region: Grand Est
- Department: Marne
- Arrondissement: Reims
- Canton: Bourgogne-Fresne
- Commune: Cormicy
- Area^{1}: 7.47 km^{2} (2.88 sq mi)
- Elevation: 96 m (315 ft)
- Highest elevation: 92 m (302 ft)
- Lowest elevation: 49 m (161 ft)
- Population (2023): 46
  - Density: 6.2/km^{2} (16/sq mi)
- Time zone: UTC+01:00 (CET)
  - Summer (DST): UTC+02:00 (CEST)
- Postal code: 51220
- ^{1} French Land Register data, which excludes lakes, ponds, glaciers > 1 km^{2} (0.386 sq mi or 247 acres) and river estuaries.

Gernicourt (French pronunciation: [ʒɛʁnikuʁ]) is a former commune in the Marne department in northern France. Previously part of the Aisne department, it was merged on 1 January 2017 into the commune Cormicy, in Marne.

== See also ==
- Communes of the Aisne department
