= Jean Dubois de Gennes =

Jean Charles Augustin Dubois de Gennes
- Born: 16 February 1895; Desvres, France
- Died: September 17, 1929 (aged 34); On the high seas
- Military career
- Allegiance: France
- Branch: Flying services
- Service years: 1914–1918
- Rank: Aspirant
- Unit: Escadrille 57
- Conflicts: World War I
- Awards: Médaille militaire Croix de Guerre

Aspirant Jean Charles Augustin Dubois de Gennes (16 February 1895 – 17 September 1929) was a World War I flying ace credited with five aerial victories. He was wounded three times in defense of his country.

== Biography ==
Jean Charles Augustin Dubois de Gennes was born on 16 February 1895 in Desvres, France. He volunteered for military service on 25 September 1914. He would serve as an artilleryman for the first few months of war, passing through the enlisted ranks while serving in three successive artillery regiments. He was appointed as an Aspirant on 1 March 1915. He was severely wounded on 8 February 1916, not returning to duty until 7 June 1916.

He went for aviation training on 15 September 1916. He graduated with his Military Pilot's Brevet on 25 March 1917. After advanced training, he was posted to Escadrille 57 on 25 April 1917. On 7 May he was wounded again; he returned to duty on 1 October 1917. He scored his first aerial victory later that month, on the 21st. Between 19 January and 12 April 1918, he shot down three more German airplanes. On 2 May 1918, he was awarded the Médaille Militaire. On the 30th, he shot down an observation balloon for his last victory. On the 31st, he was wounded again. On 2 June 1918, he was temporarily promoted to Sous lieutenant. He had also won the Croix de Guerre with four palmes and an etoile d'argent.

Dubois de Gennes would be inducted into the Legion d'honneur in 1925. He was lost at sea on 17 September 1929 while flying air mail.
