= Aspirant (Romania) =

Romanian naval rank

In the Romanian Naval Forces, Aspirant is the lowest commissioned rank, equivalent to the rank of Ensign.
