= Escadrille Spa.12 =

Escadrille N 12 - MS 12 - N12 - SPA 12
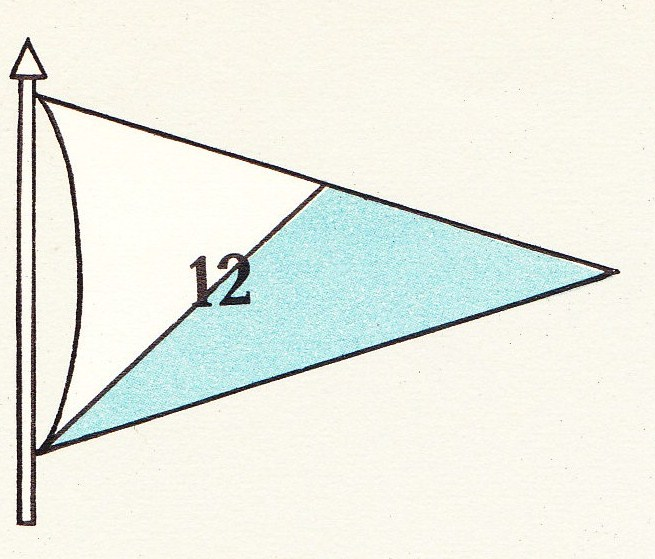
- Fuselage insignia of Escadrille 12
- Active: 1916
- Country: France
- Branch: French Air Service
- Type: Fighter Squadron
- Engagements: World War I

Escadrille 12 of the French Air Force was formed in 1912 and known for introducing Nieuport aircraft to the World War I air combat.

== History ==
Escadrille 12 was equipped initially with Nieuport IV.M two-seat monoplanes aircraft; hence its original designation as Escadrille N 12. It took the Nieuports into World War I, but was then re-equipped with Morane-Saulnier L monoplanes on 28 February 1915. In accordance with French Army designation practices, it was renamed Escadrille MS 12. By this time, the unit was assigned to the V Armee of the French Army.

In September 1915, the escadrille re-equipped once again, with Nieuport 11 single seat fighters, and it once again became Escadrille N 12. In subsequent months, it would also acquire Nieuport 12 two seat fighters, Nieuport 16s, and Nieuport 17s.

On 8 July 1916, it was cited in orders. It moved to a new assignment with II Armee on 5 October 1916. On 1 November 1916, it was one of four escadrilles consolidated into Groupe de Combat 11, the other Nieuport escadrilles being Escadrilles N31, N48, and N57.

As a component of GC 11, the escadrille was reassigned to V Armee in April 1917. In July, GC 11 moved to 1er Armee in Flanders. On 16 September 1917, it was transferred to VI Armee. In December, it upgraded to SPADs and thus became Escadrille Spa12.

Groupe de Combat 11 joined Groupe de Combat 13 and Groupe de Combat 17 to form Escadre de Combat No. 2 on 27 February 1918. In turn, Escadre de Combat No. 2 was subsumed into the 1er Division Aerienne on 14 May 1918. On 16 May 1918, Escadrille Spa 12 was cited by General Philippe Pétain for its prowess in destroying 34 enemy aircraft and two observation balloons. On 28 May 1918, GC II was detached from Escadre de Combat No. 2 and assigned to support VI Armee and V Armee. On 23 September 1918, GC 11 was moved to IV Armee. They made their final move on 6 November, to VIII Armee. When the war ended five days later, Escadrille Spa12 had been credited with victories over 43 enemy aircraft and seven observation balloons.

The heritage of the Escadrille 12 continues in the present day French air force.

== Commanding officers ==
- Escadrille N12, MS12, N12:
  - Capitaine Aubry
  - Capitaine Raymond de Pierre de Bernis: 12 May 1915 – 11 January 1918
  - Lieutenant Armand de Turenne: 12 January 1918 – end of war
- Groupe de Combat 11
  - Commandant Auguste le Reverend: 1 November 1916 – 24 January 1917
  - Capitaine Edouard Duseigneur: 25 January 1917 – 19 June 1918
  - Capitaine Marcel Bonnefay: 20 June 1918 –
- Escadre de Combat No. 2
  - Chef de Bataillon Philippe Fequant: 27 February 1918
- 1er Division Aerienne
  - General Duval

== Notable personnel ==
- Armand de Turenne
- Henri Languedoc
- Pierre Dufaur de Gavardie
- Joseph M. X. de Sévin

== Aircraft ==
- Nieuport VI.M
- Nieuport 10
- Morane-Saulnier L: 28 February 1915
- Nieuport 11: September 1915
- Nieuport 12
- Nieuport 16
- Nieuport 17
- SPAD: December 1917
