= Raoul Augereau =

French military officer (1889–1940)

- Born: Raoul Jean Eugene Augereau; 4 October 1889; La Crèche, France
- Died: 18 May 1940 (aged 50) Le Catelet, France
- Allegiance: France
- Branch: French Army; French Air Force
- Service years: 1914–1940
- Rank: Brigadier general
- Conflicts: World War I World War II †

Raoul Jean Eugene Augereau (4 October 1889 – 18 May 1940) was a French general who served in World War I and World War II.

== Pre-military career ==
Augereau was born in October 1889 in Chavagné, a village in La Crèche. A teacher like his father, he studied at the Normal School of Parthenay between 1906 and 1909. He later served in the French Army's 114th and 125th Infantry Regiments as part of his mandatory military service. Returning to civilian life, he worked as a professor in Mazières-en-Gâtine.

== Military career ==
=== World War I ===
At the start of World War I in August 1914, Augereau was commissioned as an Army lieutenant. On 1 March 1915, he was shot three times during a night patrol in no man's land. One bullet broke his right femur, causing his leg to be shortened by 5 centimetres (2.0 in) and preventing him from further infantry combat. However, he continued service as a fighter pilot, joining the Air Force as a captain.

=== Interwar period ===
After the war, Augereau was appointed the flight chief of the Istres Aviation School. He was later appointed commander of a school in Étampes. Between 1934 and 1938, he was head of military aviation in French Indochina. At the time of World War II, he was the Chief of the General Staff of the Ministry of the Colonies.

=== World War II ===
At the beginning of the war, Augereau was placed in command of the Air Force during the Battle of Sedan. He reported to Henri Giraud. Augereau's unit was virtually annihilated in combat against German forces, losing all of its equipment and most of its troops. He was shot in the forehead and killed in action on 18 May 1940 as he defended the town hall of Le Catelet.
