= Marius Hasdenteufel =

French flying ace

Marius René Marie Hasdenteufel
- Born: October 15, 1894; Sierck-les-Bains, German Lorraine (present day Lorraine, France)
- Died: June 26, 1918 (aged 23); Villenauxe-la-Grande, Aube, France
- Military career
- Allegiance: France
- Branch: Flying service
- Rank: Sous lieutenant
- Unit: Escadrille SPA.57
- Awards: Médaille militaire Croix de Guerre; Belgian Order of the Crown; Twice mentioned in dispatches

Sous Lieutenant Marius René Marie Hasdenteufel (1894–1918) was a French World War I flying ace credited with five confirmed and two probable aerial victories.

== Biography ==
See also Aerial victory standards of World War I

Marius René Marie Hasdenteufel was born on 15 October 1894 in Sierck-les-Bains, German Lorraine, in present-day Lorraine, France.

On 22 July 1915, he volunteered to serve in the French military for the duration of the World War. He was immediately posted to aviation duty. On 31 December 1915, he received Military Pilots Brevet No. 2223. In April 1916, he began artillery spotting duties in a reconnaissance squadron. He was mentioned in dispatches twice.

In November 1916, he was promoted to Adjutant. He was then sent for advanced training on fighter planes. After that, on 15 March 1917, he was stationed with Escadrille 57. On the day of his first aerial victory, 24 October 1917, he was severely wounded. He was ambulanced off to hospital on 9 November 1917. He returned to duty on 16 January 1918. Between 12 March and 25 June 1918, teaming with other French pilots, he would score four more victories. In the midst of this skein of wins, he was promoted temporarily to the rank of Sous lieutenant.

He died in an aerial accident on 26 June 1918, while piloting a SPAD S.VII biplane fighter aircraft in Champagne, in unknown circumstances.

During his service, he had been awarded the Médaille militaire, theCroix de Guerre, and the Belgian Order of the Crown.
