= Aspirant =

Military and religious rank

Aspirant is usually an officer cadet rank used in armies, navies and air forces.

In Western Christianity, an aspirant is the first stage in becoming a monastic.

== Religious use ==
In Western Christianity, the term is also used in reference to religious vocations as one who is discerning the religious life. This is followed by the novitiate, temporarily professed, and then perpetually professed.

In Buddhism, the Four stages of enlightenment are referred to as four aspirant levels in Theravada Buddhism.

== Academic use ==
An aspirant is also a title for doctoral education candidates in German and other European universities. In post-Soviet states, this educational step leads to a scientific degree called Candidate of Sciences.

== Military use ==
=== Argentine Military ===
In the Argentinian Armed Forces, an "aspirante" is a student in any of the five NCO academies. The term is also used to refer to a candidate to enter an officers academy.

=== Brazilian Military ===
In the Brazilian Military, "Aspirante" (officially Aspirante a Oficial) is a rank for a graduate of a Military Academy, either from the Armed Forces or from State Military Police Departments. It is the first rank in the "Commissioned Officer" career and it is temporary. Normally, "Aspirantes" hold that title from 6 months to 2 years, depending on the Branch. Aspirantes have the same job as 2nd Lieutenants and are treated as such by their subordinates.

=== Royal Canadian Navy ===
Like French, the Royal Canadian Navy uses the French-language rank of "Aspirant de marine" (AspM) to denote a junior officer under training. The same rank in the English language is referred to as "Naval Cadet" (NCdt). An aspirant de marine does not hold the King's commission and must either acquire a university degree or complete his first trades qualification to earn a promotion.

=== Estonian Defence Forces ===
Junior sergeant conscriptees having passed the Reserve Platoon Commander Course get ranked aspirants, meaning they will be given officer ranks (ensign or junior lieutenant) in case of mobilisation and war. Some aspirants also get promoted during reserve war games.

=== French Military ===
Aspirant (fr:Aspirant) is an officer candidate rank in the Armée de terre (Army), the Armée de l'Air et de l'Espace (Air and Space Force), the Marine nationale (Navy) and the Gendarmerie nationale. Technically, it is not a commissioned rank, but it is still treated in all respects as one. Aspirants are either officers in training in military academies or voluntaries, serving as temporary officers. The aspirant must have been previously élève officier (Officer Cadet). He can afterwards be commissioned as a sous-lieutenant or enseigne de vaisseau de deuxième classe. His insignia is a single curl of gold lace, disrupted by "flashes" of wool. It was widely used during both World Wars for providing young educated people with an officer's authority.

=== German Bundeswehr ===
Officer aspirant (de. Offizieranwärter) designates in the German Bundeswehr a military person or member of the armed forces assigned to an officer's carrier in Heer, Luftwaffe or Marine.

=== Portuguese Armed Forces ===
Aspirante-a-oficial is the first rank in the officer corps, coming below Alferes in the army and air force and Guarda-Marinha (Naval School graduates) or Sub-tenente (temporary officers graduated from civilian universities) in the navy.

=== Romanian Navy ===
In the Romanian Navy, aspirant is the lowest commissioned rank, equivalent to the rank of ensign.

== Other uses ==
In Norway, the "Aspirant Course" is a three-year trainee programme for students intending to work for the Ministry of Foreign Affairs, i.e. prospective diplomats.

== See also ==
- Junker
- Midshipman
