= Jacques Ehrlich =

French flying ace

Jacques Louis Ehrlich
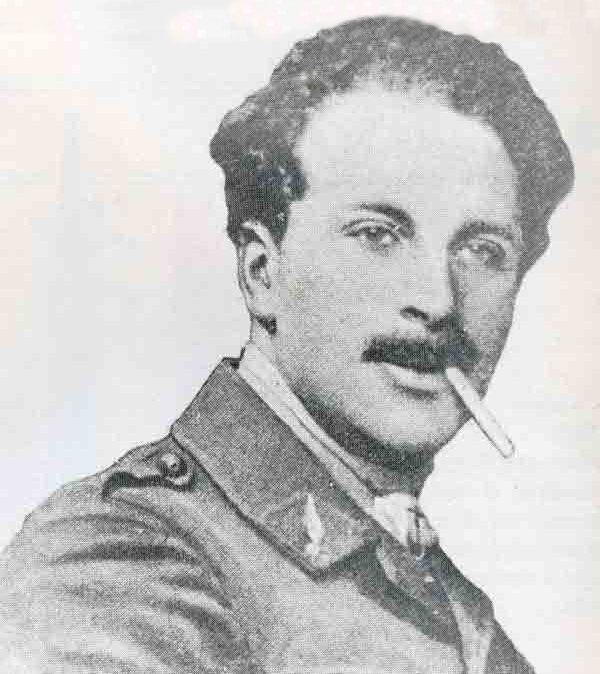
- Born: 25 October 1893; Paris, France
- Died: 10 August 1953 (aged 59); Paris, France
- Military career
- Allegiance: France
- Branch: Infantry; aviation
- Service years: 1913–1918
- Rank: Sous lieutenant
- Unit: Escadrille 154
- Awards: Médaille militaire Croix de Guerre; Mentioned in dispatches

Sous Lieutenant Jacques Louis Ehrlich (1893-1953) was a French World War I flying ace credited with 19 aerial victories; he was one of the leading balloon busters of the war.

== Biography ==
Jacques Louis Ehrlich was born in Paris on 25 October 1893.

He enlisted in the French army on 29 May 1913. Three and a half years later, in December 1916, he transferred to aviation. In May 1917, he was brevetted a pilot. Two months later, he was badly wounded while on a trench-strafing mission. He returned to duty in November as a newly promoted sergeant. Beginning on 30 June 1918, he was one of a "wolf pack" of his squadron's pilots dedicated to the highly hazardous pursuit of destroying German observation balloons. From that first victory, through the next two and a half triumphant months, he shared in the destruction of 15 enemy balloons, and shot down three others solo. On 1 August and on 15 September, he was credited with three victories each; on 17 July, he had two. After the 15 September feat of downing three balloons in two minutes, he was recommended for both the Légion d'honneur and the Médaille militaire. Three days later, he was shot down and captured while scoring his last win. After scoring with three low-level gunnery runs, Ehrlich, Paul Petit, and another wingman ran into 11 Fokker D.VIIs; in the ensuing melee, it was uncertain whether Ehrlich fell to a Fokker or to ground fire. The day after that, he began his captivity as a newly commissioned Sous lieutenant.

His total of 18 balloons downed garnered him the sixth spot on the balloon busters list. He also shared a victory over an Albatros fighter. This made him the highest scoring Allied Jewish ace of World War I, one of five notable Jewish aces in France. His score was matched by a Jewish-born German ace, Wilhelm Frankl, who had converted to Catholicism to marry his Austrian bride.

Ehrlich died in his native Paris on 10 August 1953.

== Honors and awards ==
Citation for Médaille militaire

"Remarkable pursuit pilot who has distinguished himself by his exceptional audacity and tenacity which have earned him twelve victories in one month. He flamed three balloons in a few minutes. One wound. Three citations." Médaille militaire citation, 10 September 1918
