= Michel Coiffard =

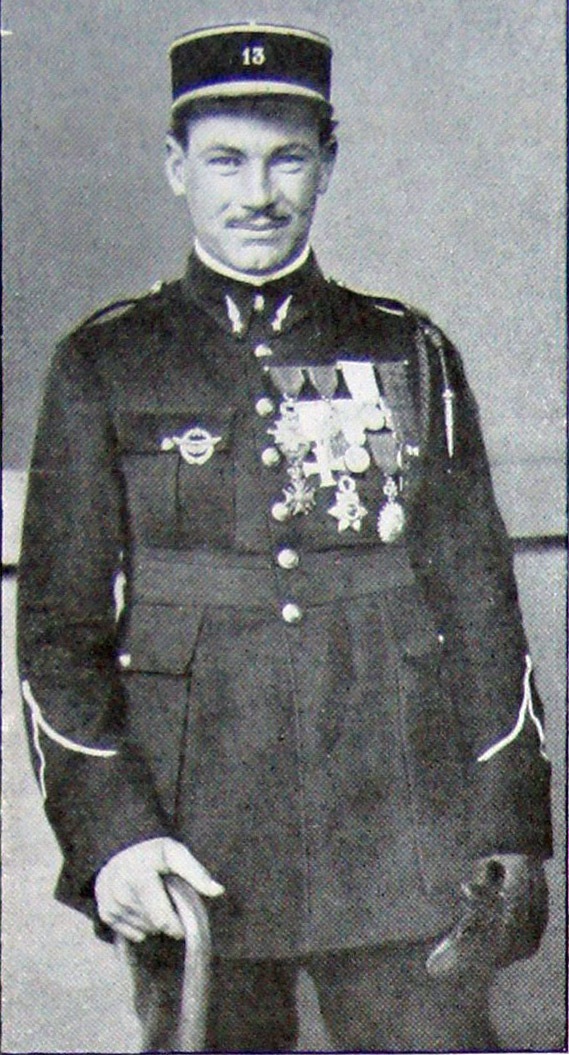
- Born: 16 July 1892; Nantes, Loire-Atlantique
- Died: 29 October 1918 (aged 26); Bergnicourt
- Military career
- Allegiance: France
- Branch: Artillery, Air Service
- Service years: 1910–1918
- Rank: Lieutenant
- Unit: N.154/Spa.154
- Commands: Spa 154
- Conflicts: World War I
- Awards: Légion d'honneur, Médaille militaire, British Military Cross

Michel Joseph Callixte Marie Coiffard (16 July 1892 – 29 October 1918) was one of the leading French flying aces of World War I. He was notable for his success as a balloon buster shooting down enemy observation balloons, which were usually heavily defended by anti-aircraft machine guns and artillery and by fighter planes. He scored 34 victories in his career.

== Life prior to aerial service ==
Coiffard was born in Nantes, Loire-Atlantique, on 16 July 1892 to Jean Coiffard and Mary Josephine Teresa de Laurent. He joined the army on 16 November 1910. The following year, he served against the Rifs in Morocco. He also served in Tunisia before World War I. He was wounded three times during his service in Africa, and awarded three citations while there. He was serving in an artillery unit when World War I began in 1914.

Repeatedly wounded and cited for courage under fire, Coiffard transferred to the infantry as a sergeant on 29 August 1914. On 29 May 1915, he earned the Medal Militaire for voluntarily braving heavy artillery fire to repair field phone lines between artillery and infantry units. He was finally declared unfit for ground combat because of a serious wound. Consequently, he joined the air service on 4 January 1917.

== Aerial service ==
He completed flight training 19 April 1917 and joined Escadrille N.154 on 28 June 1917. He achieved his first victory on 5 September. Coiffard scored two more successes in early 1918. This earned him the award of Chevalier de la Légion d'honneur on 2 February. The citation notes he was wounded four times as an infantryman.

However, not until the squadron transitioned in June from Nieuports to the sturdy SPAD series did he hit his stride. N.154 was re-designated Spa154 to mark the change in aircraft. Coiffard had his new craft's wheels and cowl painted red and dubbed his new Spad XIII 'Mado' after his girlfriend. He also began collaborating with squadron mates in concerted attacks on observation balloons. As a result, Spa154 would become the premier balloon busting squadron of the war, with over 70 claimed. However, the French system of awarding a victory to every pilot involved in a shoot-down blurs the actual count.

Lieutenant Coiffard succeeded to the task of squadron commander upon the wounding of Capitaine Lahoulle on 15 July. In this capacity, he was admired as a trainer of his pilots; on one occasion, he sent a pilot on a month's leave to recuperate from combat fatigue.

As a "balloon specialist", Coiffard made his mark as a warrior destroying nine Drachen balloons in July, along with three German aircraft. At the end of July, he had run his score to 17, adding eight in August and six more in September. On three occasions, he shot down three balloons in the same day. On the last of these triple victory days, 15 September, he and his wingman downed three observation balloons in six minutes.

== His death in action ==
On 28 October 1918, Spa 154 was on patrol. Coiffard spotted German Fokker D.VIIs, and gave the signal to attack, which was seen only by his wingman. He and Second Lieutenant Condemine fought it out with the German patrol. While downing his 34th victim (a Fokker D.VII), he was critically wounded by two bullets; one hit him in the thigh and the other pierced his chest back to front passing through a lung. He flew 12 kilometres (7.5 mi) back to a perfect landing in friendly hands despite his wound, but died three hours later while receiving a blood transfusion in an ambulance transporting him to Berenicourt. The following day, he was posthumously made an Officer de la Légion d'honneur.

Coiffard's record included 24 balloons (21 shared) and 10 airplanes (4 shared), ranking him sixth among French aces. Only two World War I aces shot down a greater number of observation balloons.

He was buried in the National Necropolis of Sommepy-Tahure (Marne) in grave number 1027.

== Decorations and awards ==
=== Médaille militaire ===
"On 29 May 1915, as an artillery observer in the trenches under extremely violent bombardment by heavy artillery, he spontaneously offered himself to serve as a liaison between the infantry and artillery, the telephone connection with the artillery having been destroyed by enemy fire. When the infantry telephone network had been severed in its turn he carried it along the artillery line and made repairs in terrain attacked by 105 and 150 artillery projectiles. Non-commissioned officer of remarkable courage and sang-froid; the campaigns in Tunisia and Morocco, three wounds, three citations."

=== Chevalier de la Légion d'honneur ===
"A valiant officer and a model of courage, initiative and devotion. Wounded four times in the infantry, he entered the aviation service where he has proven his most brilliant military qualities. He downed his third enemy plane on 2 February 1918, during the course of a particularly difficult combat. Médaille militaire for feats of war. Six citations."

=== Officier de la Légion d'honneur ===
"An officer of fierce energy and incomparable bravery. In Morocco he had already gained attention by his audacity. In the actual war he served successively in the artillery, infantry and air service attracting throughout amazement and admiration because of his scorn of death and his admirable spirit of sacrifice. In pursuit aviation his will to conquer allowed him to accomplish a series of exploits with regularity and speed which have never been equaled. He reported 32 official victories, of which 27 were gained in three months. Three wounds, Médaille militaire and Chevalier de la Légion d'honneur for feats of war. Fifteen citations."
