= List of World War I flying aces from France =

This is a complete list of French flying aces of World War I.

While Roland Garros is often called the first French Ace, he has only four confirmed victories. The distinction of being the first French Ace goes to Adolphe Pégoud.

Aces are listed after verifying the date and location of combat, and the foe vanquished, for every victory accredited by the Aéronautique Militaire using their own aerial victory standards. Those victories for which the evidence is unavailable or fragmentary have been excluded from the victory count.

== 20 or more victories ==
- René Fonck
- Georges Guynemer
- Charles Nungesser
- Georges Madon
- Maurice Boyau
- Michel Coiffard
- Léon Bourjade
- Armand Pinsard
- René Dorme
- Gabriel Guérin
- Marcel Haegelen
- Pierre Marinovitch
- Alfred Heurtaux
- Albert Deullin

== 15-19 victories ==
- Jacques Ehrlich
- Henri Hay De Slade
- Bernard Barny de Romanet
- Jean Chaput
- Gervais Raoul Lufbery (Note: Held dual Franco-American citizenship.)
- Armand de Turenne
- Gilbert Sardier

== 11-14 victories ==
- Marius Ambrogi
- Jean Casale
- Omer Demeuldre
- Hector Garaud
- Marcel Nogues
- Bernard Artigau
- Gustave Daladier
- Joseph M. X. de Sévin
- Fernand Guyou
- Marcel A. Hugues
- Lucien J. Jailler
- Adrien L. J. Leps
- Charles J. V. Macé
- Jean Navarre
- Charles Nuville
- Paul Tarascon
- Paul Y. R. Waddington
- Armond J. Berthelot
- Jean G. Bouyer
- Jean Bozon-Verduraz
- André Julien Chainat
- André Herbelin
- William Herisson
- Maxime Lenoir
- Ernest Maunoury
- René Montrion
- Jacques Ortoli

== 10 victories ==
- Maurice Bizot
- Lucien Gasser
- Auguste Lahoulle
- Jean André Pezon
- Charles Quette
- Laurent B. Ruamps

== 9 victories ==
- Fernand Bonneton
- Alexandre Bretillon
- Arthur Coadou
- Théophile Henri Condemine
- Mathieu Tenant de la Tour
- Marcel Marc Dhome
- Gustave Douchy
- René Dousinelle
- Georges Lachmann
- Jean Matton
- Henri Albert Péronneau
- Marcel Vialet

== 8 victories ==
- Paul Barbreau
- Dieudonné Costes
- Gilbert de Guingand
- Georges Flachaire
- Jean Alfred Fraissinet
- Jacques Gerard
- Louis Prosper Gros
- Julien Guertiau
- Antoine Laplasse
- André-Henri Martenot de Cordou
- Robert Massenet-Royer de Marancour
- Edmond Pillon
- Roger Poupon
- Paul Sauvage
- Del Vial

== 7 victories ==
- Alfred Auger
- François Battesti
- André Louis Bosson
- Eugene Camplan
- Fernand Henri Chavannes
- Pierre De Cazenove De Pradines
- Pierre Delage
- Robert Delannoy
- François Delzenne
- François de Rochechouart
- Noël de Rochefort
- Jean Derode
- René Doumer
- Pierre Ducornet
- Raoul Echard
- Henri Languedoc
- Marie Lecoq De Kerland
- Jean Loste
- Alexandre Marty
- Xavier Moissinac
- Pierre Pendaries
- Paul Petit
- Jean C. Romatet
- Paul Santelli
- Victor Sayaret
- Gabriel Thomas
- Marie Vitalis
- Joseph Vuillemin
- Eugène Weismann

== 6 victories ==
- Albert Chabrier
- Louis Coudouret
- Jules Covin
- François de Boigne
- Joseph De Bonnefoy
- Lionel de Marmier
- André Dubonnet
- Pierre Dufaur de Gavardie
- Paul Gastin
- Maurice Gond
- Marcel Henriot
- André Robert Lévy
- Louis Martin
- Gustave Naudin
- Adolphe Pégoud
- Émile Régnier
- Achille Rousseaux
- Constant Soulier

== 5 victories ==
- Albert Achard
- Maurice Arnoux
- Jean Arpheuil
- Yves F. Barbaza
- Andre Barcat
- Auguste Baux
- Georges Blanc
- Marcel Bloch
- Charles Borzecki
- Alexandre Buisson
- Pierre Cardon
- Lucien Cayol
- Antoine Cordonnier
- Honoré de Bonald
- Jean de Gaillard de la Valdène
- Andre Delorme
- Jean Dubois de Gennes
- Jean-Paul Favre de Thierrens
- Pierre Gauderman
- Eugène Gilbert
- Francis Guerrier
- Joseph-Henri Guiguet
- Georges Halberger
- Paul Hamot
- Marius Hasdenteufel
- Marcel Hauss
- Paul Homo
- Jean Jannekeyn
- Didier Lecour Grandmaison
- Pierre Le Roy de Boiseaumarié
- Georges Lienhart
- Paul Malavialle
- Paul Montange
- Antoine Paillard
- Georges Pelletier d'Oisy
- Andre Petit-Delchet
- Constant Plessis
- François Portron
- Georges Raymond
- Victor Regnier
- Charles Revol-Tissot
- Louis Rissacher
- Maurice Robert
- Paul Rodde
- Jacques Roques
- Maurice Rousselle
- Basile Saune
- Etienne Tsu
- Gilbert J. Uteau
- Pierre Violet-Marty
- Pierre Wertheim
