= Bonnefoy =

Bonnefoy is a surname of French origin. Notable people with the surname include:

- Germaine Arbeau-Bonnefoy (1893–1986), French musician
- Henri Bonnefoy (1887–1914), French sport shooter
- Laurent Bonnefoy, French political scientist
- Mathilde Bonnefoy (born 1972), French film editor and director
- Morgane Bonnefoy (born 1990), French luger
- Nicole Bonnefoy (born 1958), French politician
- Robert de Bonnefoy (1894–1946), French soldier
- Yves Bonnefoy (1923–2016), French poet and art historian
- Francis Bonnefoy, the human name chosen for the personification of France from the anime series Axis Powers Hetalia
