= Escadrille 65 =

WWI French Air Force unit (1915)

Escadrille N 65 - SPA 65
- Active: 1915
- Country: France
- Branch: French Air Service
- Type: Fighter Squadron
- Engagements: World War I

Escadrille 65 of the French Air Force was established during World War I. It was founded at Lyon-Bron Airport on 2 August 1915.

== History ==
Though it was equipped with a mixed bag of aircraft, it was designated as Escadrille C 65 for its Caudron G.IVs. It was assigned to VII Armee of the French Army on 24 October 1915. It was re-equipped in its entirety with Nieuports, and was redesignated Escadrille N 65 on 21 February 1916. In June 1916, it was consolidated into an ad hoc Groupe de Combat that was based at Cachy. Other escadrilles within the Groupe were N3, N37, N62, N73, and N103. In early November 1916, Escadrille N65 was reassigned into Groupe de Combat 13. GC 13 also contained Escadrille N67, Escadrille N112, and Escadrille N.124.

On 5 December 1916, Escadrille N 65 received its first citation. As 1917 began, the escadrille was operating a mixture of Spad VIIs and Nieuport 17s. On 17 March 1917, the unit was detached from GC 13 to support VI Armee in the Second Battle of the Aisne. The escadrille rejoined GC 13 on 3 June 1917. In July, it moved to support the 1er Armee in Flanders. It was reassigned to II Armee on 11 August 1917. The following month, the escadrille moved once again, to support VI Armee. The flying unit's second citation came through on 16 November 1917, lauding them for downing 68 enemy aircraft and five observation balloons. This second citation entitled the unit's members to the fourragere of the Croix de Guerre.

The Summer of 1918 saw Escadrille 65 subsumed into ever larger units. GC 13 was consolidated into Escadre de Combat No. 2; it in turn was assigned to 1er Division Aerienne. The escadrille continued its valorous service. It was cited twice in September 1918, on the 10th and 19th. The unit's personnel won the right to wear the fourragere of the Medaille Militare. Escadrille 65 ended the war credited with 108 enemy aircraft destroyed.

Escadrille 65 continues its service in the current French Air Force.

== Commanding officers ==
- Lieutenant Louis Gonnet-Thomas: 2 August 1915 – 1 May 1916
- Lieutenant Georges Boillot: 2 May 1916 – killed in an accident 17 May 1916
- Capitaine Philippe Fequant: 18 May 1916 – early November 1916
- Capitaine Emile Billon du Plan: early November 1916 – killed in an accident 29 April 1917
- Capitaine Lamy: 30 April 1917 – c. 23 January 1918
- Capitaine Louis Sejourne: 24 January 1918 – end of war

== Notable personnel ==
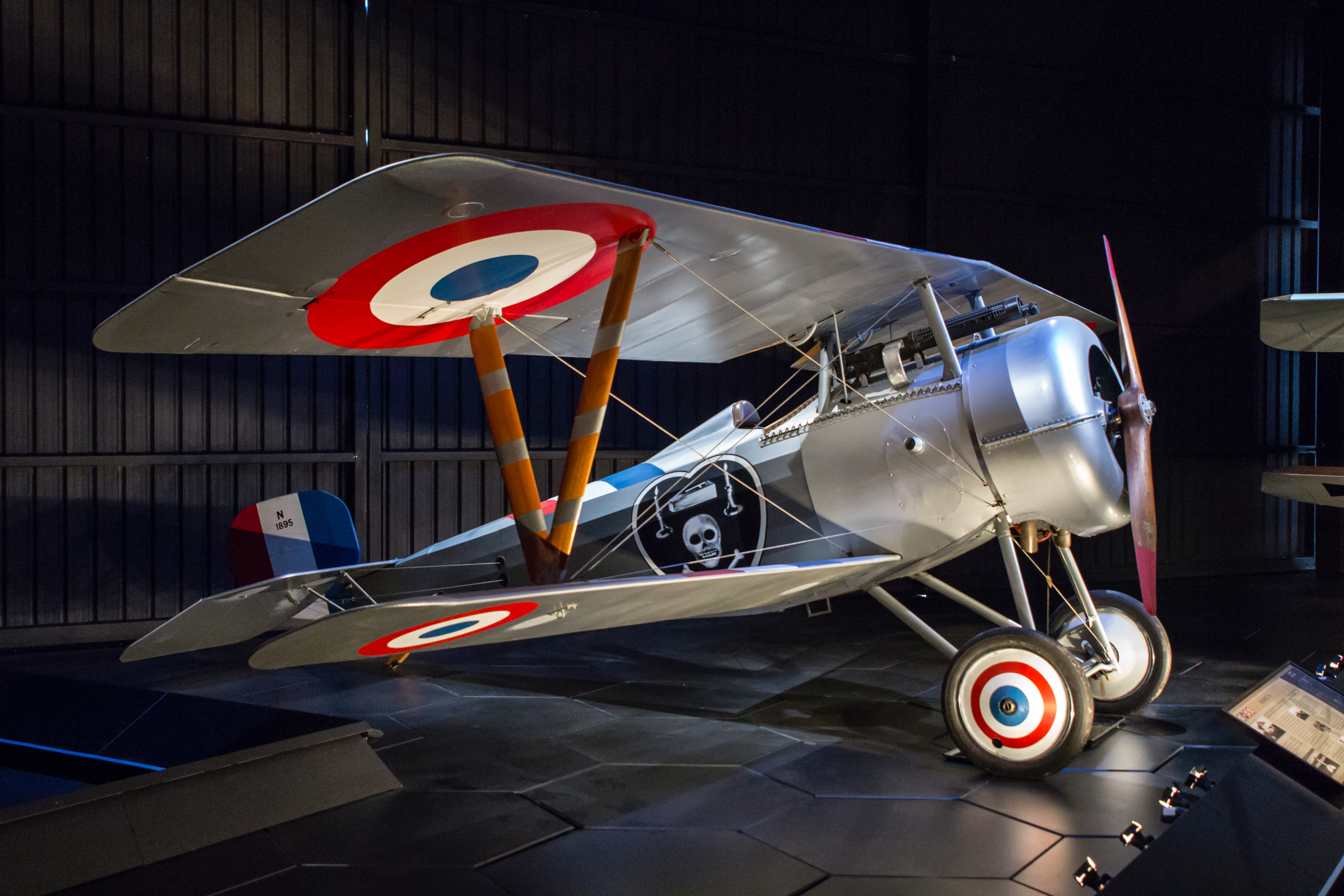
Nungesser was not known to fly a Nieuport 24bis, but this museum display of one displays the ace's markings.

- Lieutenant Charles Nungesser
- Sergente Jacques Gerard
- Sergente Paul Sauvage
- Sous lieutenant Eugene Camplan
- Adjutant Marcel Henriot
- Lieutenant Joseph De Bonnefoy
- Lieutenant Lucien Cayol
- Sous lieutenant Constant Plessis
- Capitaine Óscar Monteiro Torres (first Portuguese aviator to be killed in an air combat)

== Aircraft ==
- Established with two Nieuport 11s, three Nieuport 12s, three Caudron G.IVs
- Nieuport 17s: January 1917
- Spad VIIs: January 1917

== Duty stations ==
- Nancy, France
- Behonne, France: 24 February 1916
- Flanders
