= Chabrier (surname) =

Chabrier is a French surname. Notable people with the surname include:

- Albert Chabrier (1896–1920), French World War I flying ace
- Carole Chabrier, French-Monagesque television host
- Emmanuel Chabrier (1841–1894), French musician
- Gilles Chabrier, French physicist and astrophysicist
