= Vial (disambiguation) =

A vial is a small vessel used for storage.

Vial or VIAL may also refer to:

- Vial (surname)
- Vial (band)
- Vial of Life, medical program
- Piz Vial, mountain in Switzerland
- Distribuidor Vial, Mexican freeway
- C.D.F.A. Arturo Fernández Vial, Chilean football club
- Port Vial, a fictional location in Twenty One Pilots lore
- Prayagraj Airport, formerly Allahabad Airport, ICAO code VIAL
