= Soulier =

Soulier is a French occupational surname which means "shoemaker", from the Old French soulier meaning "shoe" or "sandal". The name may refer to:

- Constant Soulier (1897–1933), French pilot
- Fabrice Soulier (born 1969), French poker player
- Jean-Pierre Soulier (1755–1812), French musician
- Jean Pierre Soulier (1915–2003), French physician
- Léon-Raymond Soulier (1924–2016), French bishop

== See also ==
- Bernard–Soulier syndrome
- Shoemaker (surname)
