= Charles Nungesser =

French fighter ace and adventurer (1892–1927)

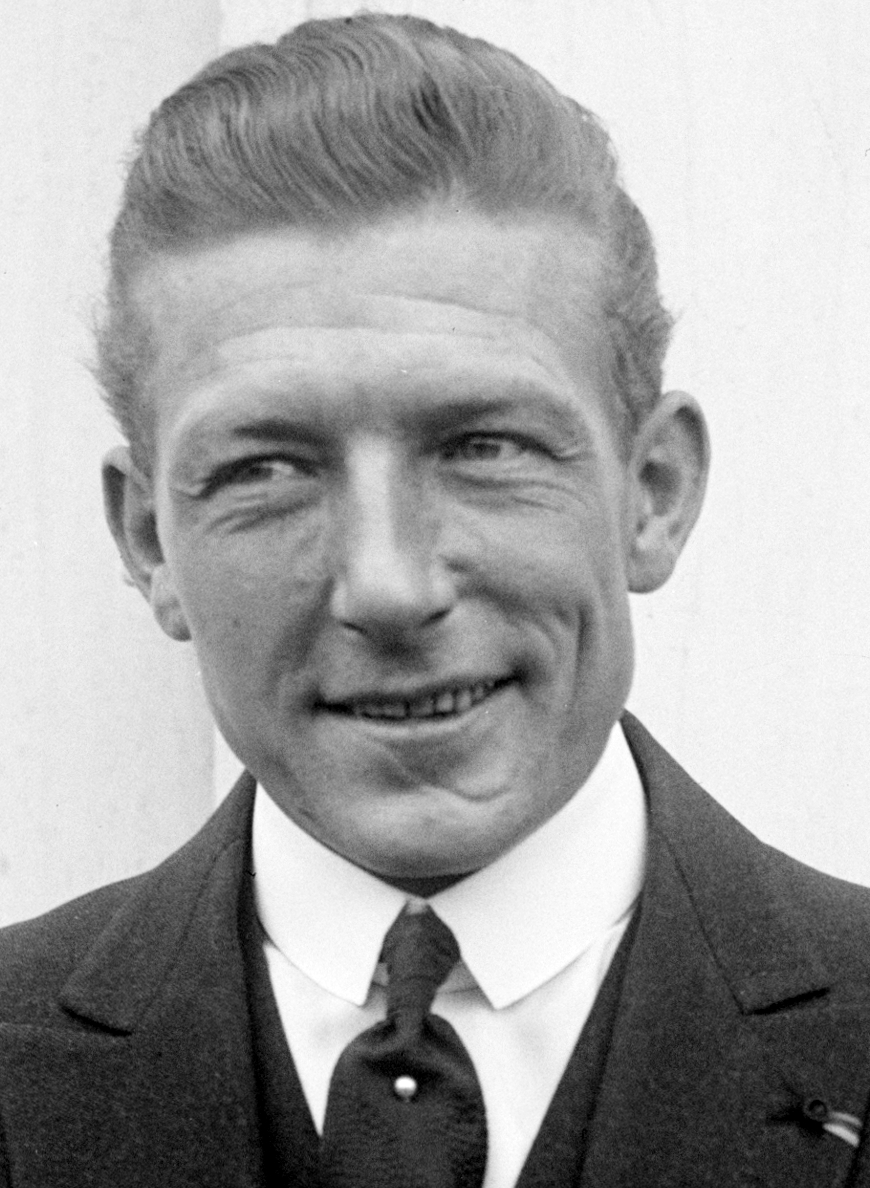
- Charles Nungesser
- Born: 15 March 1892; Paris, France
- Disappeared: 8 May 1927 (aged 35); Atlantic Ocean
- Military career
- Allegiance: France
- Branch: French Air Service
- Service years: 1914–1918
- Rank: Captain
- Units: Escadrille 65, V106, V116
- Awards: Légion d'honneur; Croix de guerre (France) with 28 Palmes; Médaille militaire; Croix de guerre (Belgium); Order of Leopold (Belgium) (Belgium); Distinguished Service Cross (US); War Cross (Portugal); Order of Karađorđe's Star(Serbia); Medal for Bravery (Serbia) (Serbia)

Charles Eugène Jules Marie Nungesser (15 March 1892 – presumably on or after 8 May 1927) was a French ace pilot and adventurer. Nungesser was a renowned ace in France, ranking third highest in the country with 43 air combat victories during World War I.

After the war, Nungesser mysteriously disappeared on an attempt to make the first non-stop transatlantic flight from Paris to New York, flying with wartime comrade François Coli in L'Oiseau Blanc (The White Bird). Their aircraft took off from Paris on 8 May 1927, was sighted once more over Ireland, and then was never seen again. The aircraft was either lost over the Atlantic or crashed in Newfoundland or Maine. Two weeks after Nungesser and Coli's attempt, Charles Lindbergh successfully made the journey, flying solo from New York to Paris in Spirit of St. Louis. Monuments and museums honoring Nungesser and Coli's attempt exist at Le Bourget airport in Paris and on the cliffs of Étretat, the location from which their plane was last sighted in France.

== Early life ==
Charles Nungesser was born on 15 March 1892 in Paris and, as a child, was very interested in competitive sports. After attending the École des Arts et Métiers, where he was a mediocre student who nonetheless excelled in sports such as boxing, he went to South America – first to Rio de Janeiro, Brazil, to search for an uncle who could not be located and then to Buenos Aires, Argentina, where he worked as an auto mechanic before becoming a professional racer. His interest in racing soon led him to flying airplanes; Nungesser learned to fly by using a Blériot plane owned by a friend. After he eventually found his missing uncle, he worked on his sugar plantation in the Buenos Aires province.

== World War I exploits ==
=== Enlisting in the cavalry ===
When World War I broke out, Nungesser returned to France where he enlisted with the 2nd Régiment de Hussards. During one patrol, he and several soldiers commandeered a German Mors patrol car after killing its occupants. This impressed his superiors and he was subsequently awarded the Médaille militaire and granted his request to be transferred to the Service Aéronautique.

=== Serving in the Service Aéronautique ===
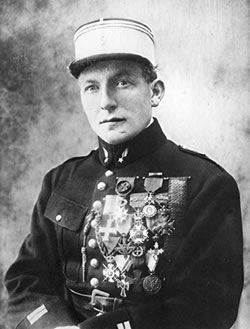
Charles Nungesser wearing his numerous military decorations.

As a military pilot, he was transferred to Escadrille VB106. While there, in July 1915, he shot down his first plane, a German Albatros, and was awarded the Croix de guerre. On 31 July 1915, Nungesser and his mechanic Roger Pochon were on standby duty. The two took off in a Voisin 3LAS despite Nungesser's assignment to non-flying duties. In an encounter with five Albatros two-seaters, the French duo shot one down near Nancy, France. Returning to their airfield, Nungesser was placed under house arrest for eight days for his insubordination. He was then decorated and forwarded to training in Nieuport fighters.

By the time Nungesser left VB106, he had flown 53 bombing missions. He had also emblazoned at least one of the Escadrille's planes with his elaborate gruesome personal insignia: the freebooter's skull and crossbones and a coffin with two candles.

In November 1915, after retraining, he was transferred to Escadrille N.65 (the 65th Squadron) and was later attached to the famous Lafayette Escadrille, composed of American volunteers. While visiting the Escadrille on one of his convalescent periods recuperating from his wounds, he borrowed a plane and shot down another German aircraft while he was there. By the end of 1916, he had claimed 21 aerial victories.

=== Undisciplined at times ===
Despite being a decorated pilot, Nungesser was placed under house arrest on more than one occasion for flying without permission. He disliked strict military discipline and went to Paris to enjoy its many pleasures (such as alcohol and women) as often as possible. He was a leading fighter pilot whose combat exploits against the Germans were widely publicized in France. Nungesser's rugged good looks, flamboyant personality, and appetite for danger, beautiful women, wine, and fast cars made him the embodiment of the stereotypical fighter ace. He would sometimes arrive for morning patrol still dressed in the tuxedo he had worn the night before and even occasionally with a female companion. In contrast to the unsociable but nonetheless top French ace René Fonck, Nungesser was well liked by his comrades. He suffered a very bad crash on 6 February 1916 that broke both his legs and he was to be injured again many times. He was often so hobbled by wounds and injuries that he had to be helped into his cockpit.

=== Victories as a fighter ace ===
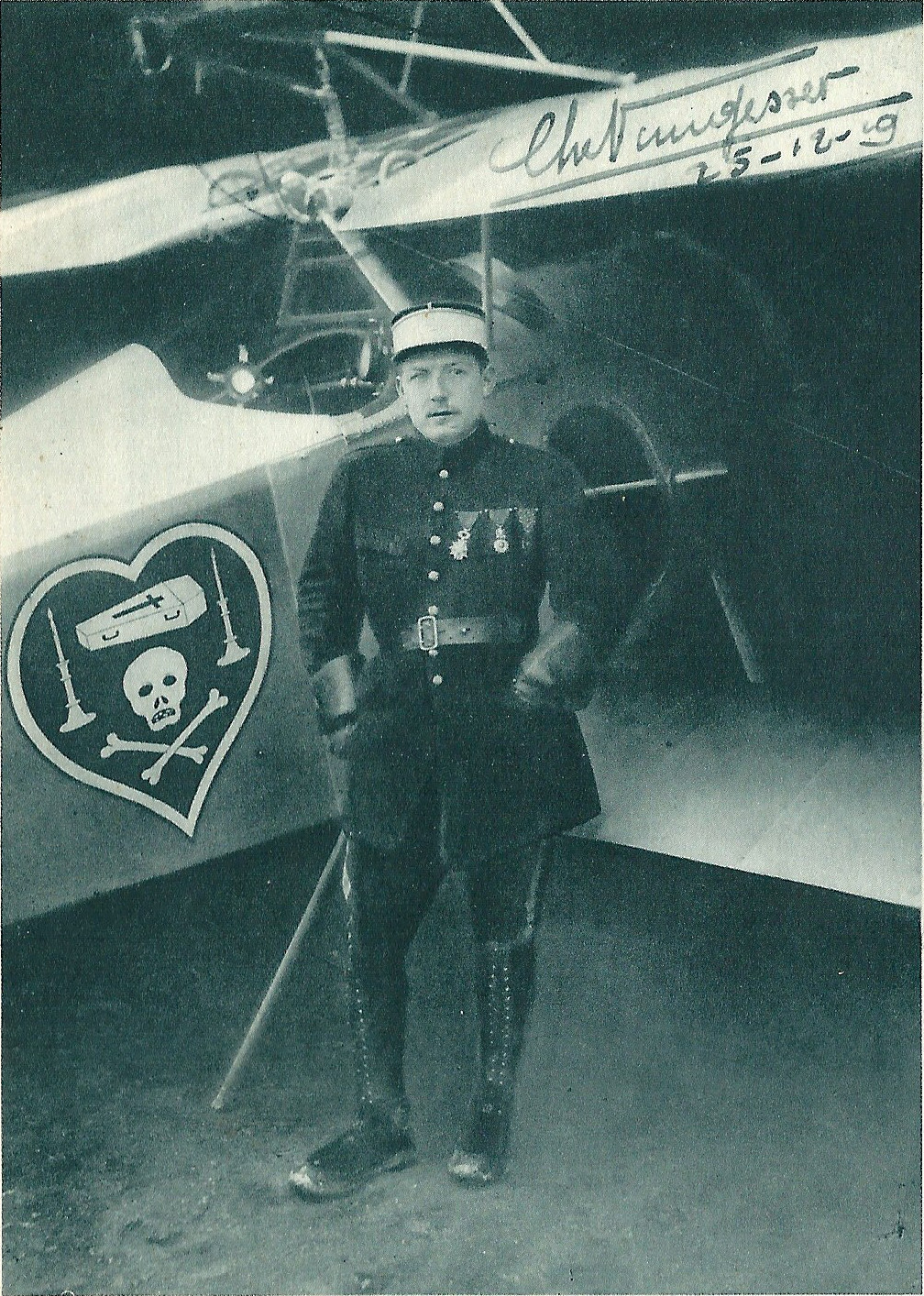
'The Knight of Death', Nungesser with his Nieuport 17

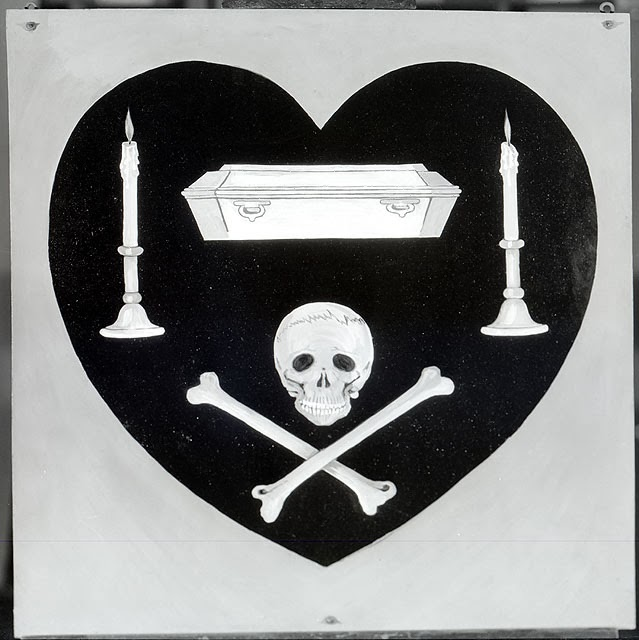
Nungesser's personal insignia

Notwithstanding early setbacks, Nungesser became an ace in April 1916. He was wounded on 19 May 1916 but continued to score victories, a streak that ended once he was wounded again in June. Nevertheless, he finished the year with 21 aerial victories. It was during this time he downed two German aces, Hans Schilling, on 4 December, as well as Kurt Haber on the 20th.

His silver Nieuport 17 plane was decorated with a black heart-shaped field, within which was painted in white a macabre Jolly Roger, a coffin and two candles. He had adopted the title "The Knight of Death", paraphrasing the French word mort ("death"), a play on words for the German Mors vehicle like the one he captured as a cavalryman.

In early 1917, Nungesser had to return to hospital for treatment of injuries but managed to avoid being grounded. He had pushed his score to 30 by 17 August 1917, when he downed his second Gotha bomber. Injuries from a car crash in December got him a month's respite as an instructor before he returned to flying combat with Escadrille 65. He still flew a Nieuport (a Nieuport 25), even though the squadron had re-equipped with SPADs. By May 1918, he had 35 victories, including a shared victory each with Jacques Gérard and Eugène Camplan and was eventually raised to Officer of the Légion d'honneur.

By August 1918, he finally received a Spad XIII aircraft and resumed his winning streak. On 14 August, he shot down four observation balloons for wins 39 through 42. The following day, he shared a win with Marcel Henriot and another pilot and finished the war with 43 official victories, the third highest number among French fliers behind René Fonck and Georges Guynemer.

In his flying career, Nungesser received dozens of military decorations from France, Belgium, Montenegro, United States of America, Portugal, Russia, Serbia and the United Kingdom.

=== Wounds and injuries ===
By the end of the war, a succinct summary of Nungesser's wounds and injuries read: "Skull fracture, brain concussion, internal injuries (multiple), five fractures of the upper jaw, two fractures of lower jaw, piece of anti-aircraft shrapnel imbedded [sic] in right arm, dislocation of knees (left and right), re-dislocation of left knee, bullet wound in mouth, bullet wound in ear, atrophy of tendons in left leg, atrophy of muscles in calf, dislocated clavicle, dislocated wrist, dislocated right ankle, loss of teeth, contusions too numerous to mention."

== Post-World War I activities and disappearance ==
=== Work in the film industry ===
After the conclusion of World War I in November 1918, Nungesser tried to organize a private flying school but failed to attract enough students. In January 1919, Nungesser's personal insignia was trademarked in France.

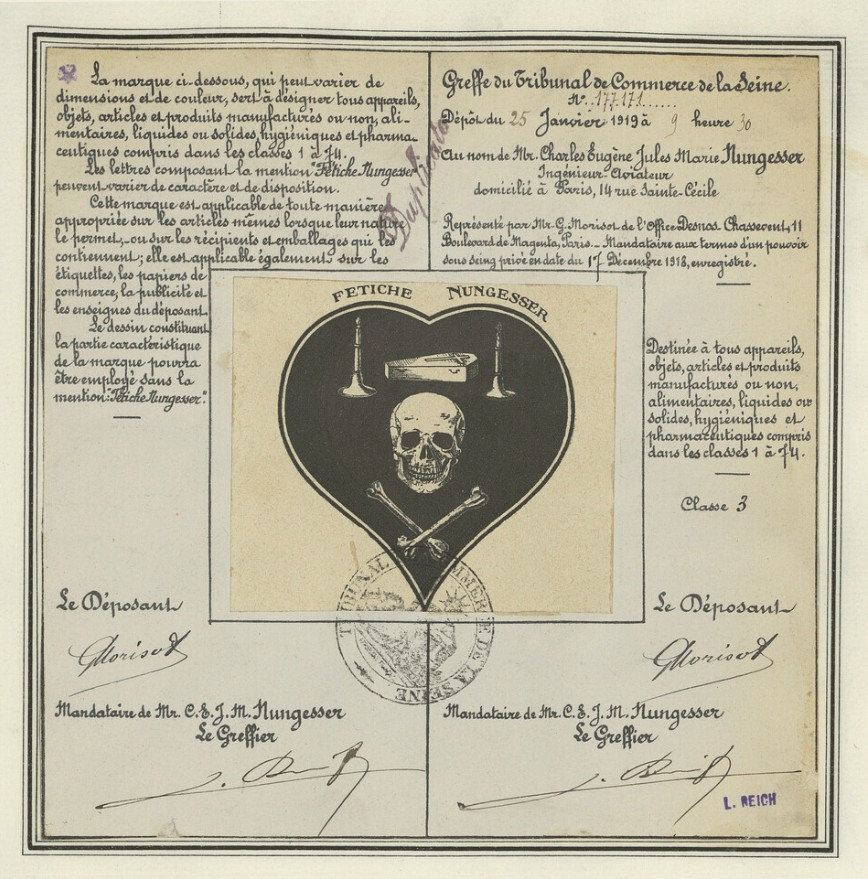
Nungesser's Trademark Document 1919

As the post-World War I economic recession had left many World War I aces without a job, he decided to take his chances with cinema in the United States, where the days of heroic flying were a very popular theme. It was when Nungesser was in the U.S. doing the film The Sky Raider that he became interested in the idea of making a transatlantic flight and told his friends his next trip to America would be by air.

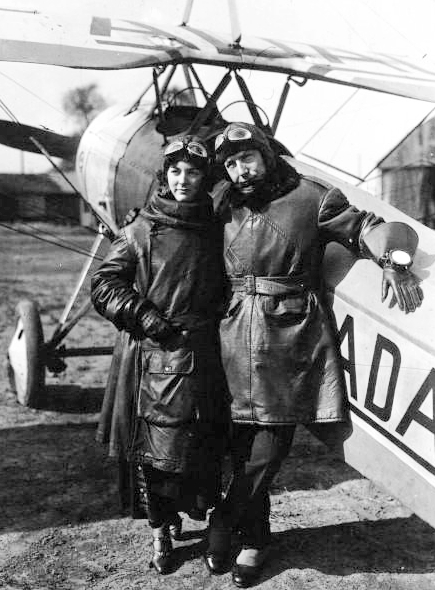
Nungesser and fiancée, 1923

In 1923, Nungesser became engaged to Consuelo Hatmaker. They married in 1923 and separated in 1926.

=== Attempt at aircraft sales ===
In late 1923, Nungesser headed up an ill-starred voyage to Havana. Having been invited by the secretary to the President, José Manuel Cortina, when the latter was vacationing in Paris, Nungesser seemed to have assumed he had received an official tender from the Cuban government. At any rate, Nungesser brought four World War I SPADs with him, as well as two fellow veterans. Nungesser based the SPADs with the Cuban Air Corps at Campo Colombia. He then proposed that the Cubans buy forty or more airplanes from him. When the Cuban Army pleaded lack of budget, Nungesser so aggressively importuned the Cuban Congress that the Cuban army Chief of Staff, General Alberto Herrera y Franchi, threatened to throw Nungesser's party out of the country. On 10 February 1924, the French ace ended his Cuban sojourn with a fundraising flying exhibition, proceeds going to charity.

=== Nungesser disappears ===
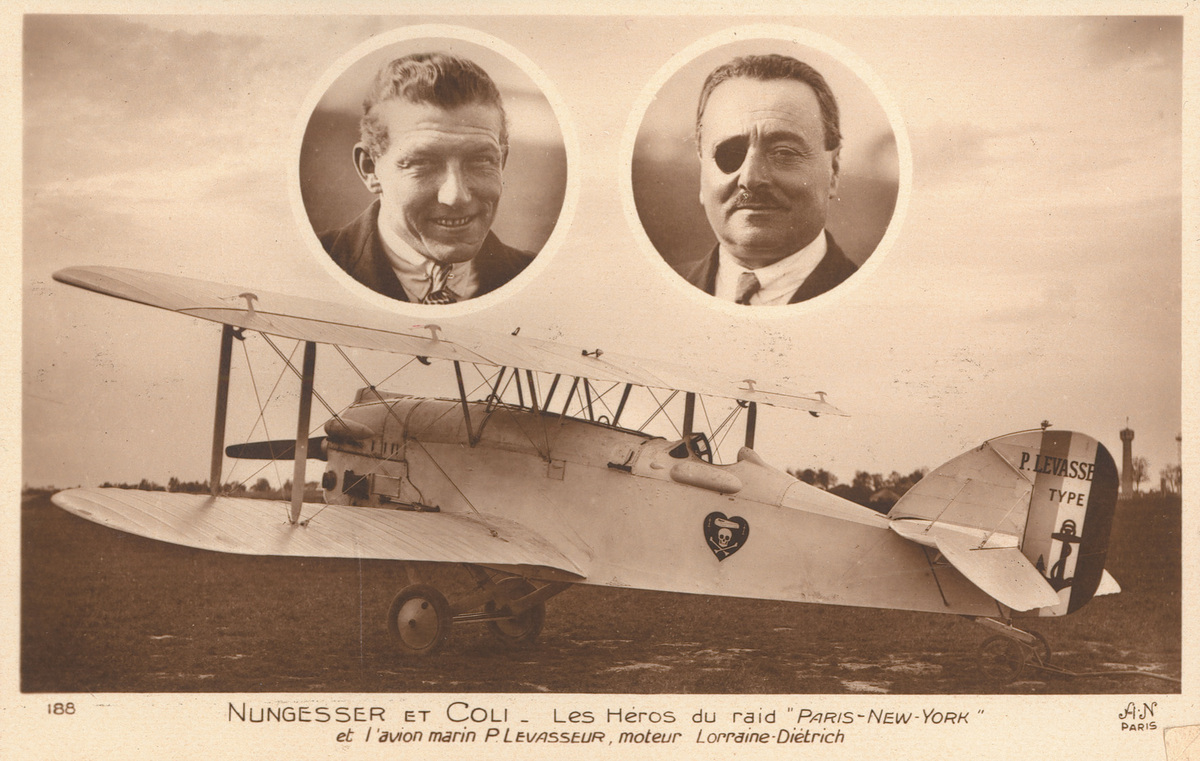
Postcard of "The White Bird" with Nungesser and Coli

François Coli, a navigator already known for making historic flights across the Mediterranean, had been planning a transatlantic flight since 1923, with his wartime comrade Paul Tarascon, another World War I ace. When Tarascon had to drop out because of an injury from a crash, Nungesser came in as a replacement. Nungesser and Coli took off from Le Bourget airport near Paris on 8 May 1927, heading for New York in their L'Oiseau Blanc (The White Bird) aircraft, a Levasseur PL.8 biplane painted with Nungesser's old World War I insignia. Their plane was sighted heading past Ireland and, when they never arrived, the assumption was that their plane had crashed in the North Atlantic Ocean. Two weeks later, American aviator Charles Lindbergh successfully crossed from New York to Paris and was given an immense hero's welcome by the French, even as they mourned for the losses of Nungesser and Coli.

Over the years, there have been various investigations to try to determine what happened to Nungesser and Coli. Most believe that the plane came down in the Atlantic due to a rain squall, but the aircraft has never been recovered. The leading alternative theory is that the aircraft may have crashed in Maine. This is supported by rumored sightings of the plane over Newfoundland and Nova Scotia.

A report in a French newspaper that Nungesser and Coli arrived safely was followed by a detailed description of the festivities, etc., but all this was a hoax. The anti-American sentiment it generated led to Lindbergh being advised to delay his own flight a few weeks, until the furore and resentment had died down.

== Commemoration ==
Many streets in France are named after Nungesser, usually jointly with Coli.

In 1928, the Ontario Surveyor General named a number of lakes in the northwest of the province to honour aviators who had perished during 1927, mainly in attempting oceanic flights. Amongst them are Nungesser Lake (51.49°N 93.52°W) and Coli Lake (51.32°N 93.59°W).

The town of Gander, NL, Canada has named a street after Charles Nungesser (48.953497, −54.612927). The modern town of Gander was started in late 1950s and most of its streets are named after famous aviators.

== In film ==
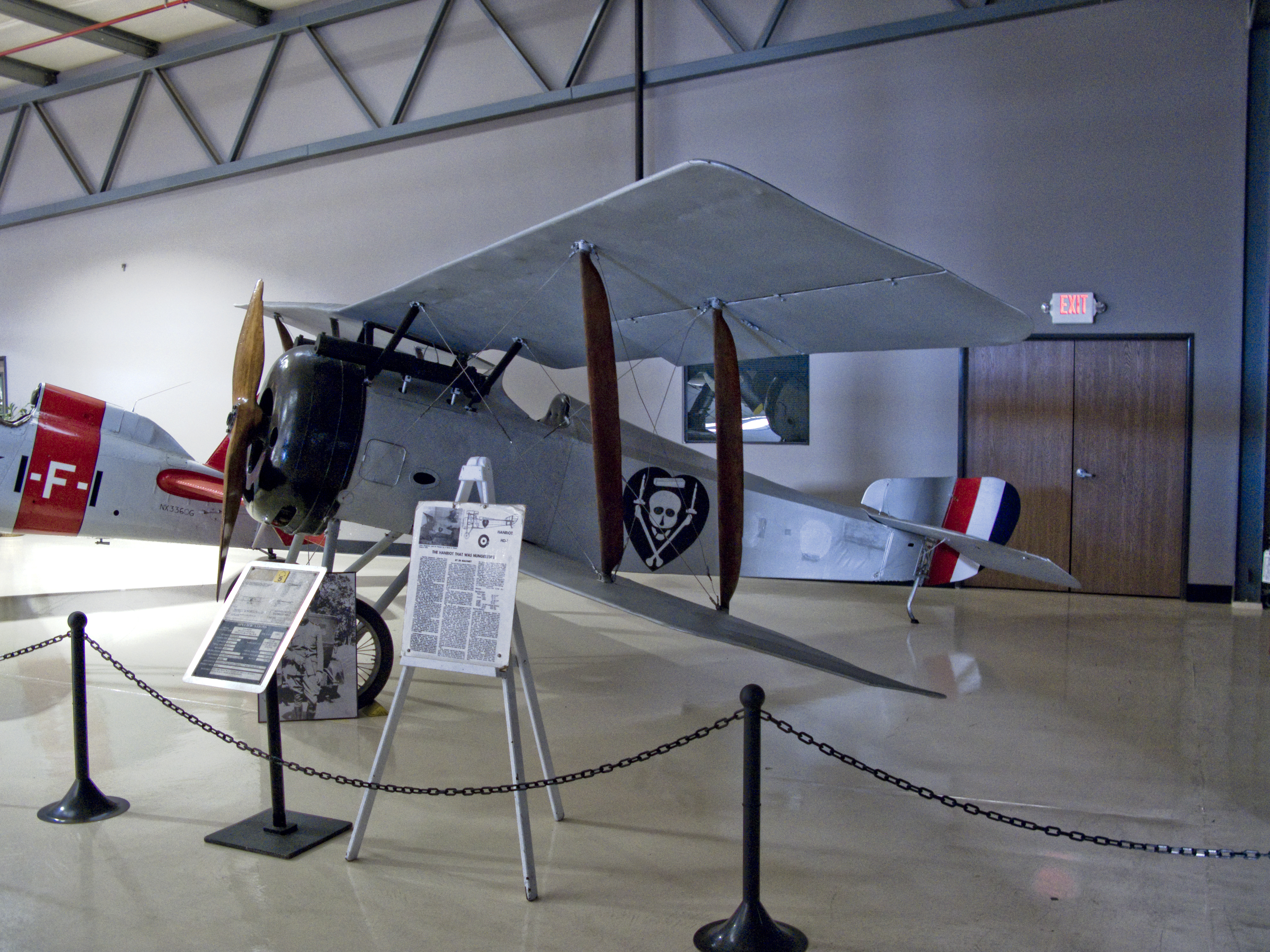
Nungesser's Hanriot HD-1 on display at Planes of Fame air museum in Chino, California.

The first American air fighting super production film, The Dawn Patrol (1930), featured Nungesser flying himself in his own plane with The Knight of Death emblem on it. The film was released in 1930, well after Nungesser's disappearance, but filmed four years earlier. The plane he flew was not a Nieuport 17, as he flew in the war, but a Hanriot HD.1 type. The film, directed by Howard Hawks, became a success due to the many scenes of spectacular dogfighting. A number of other aces of World War I, of various nationalities, have been used to fly planes in similar film productions or airshow demonstrations as well.

Contrary to rumor, Nungesser was not one of the stunt pilots killed during the filming of Hell's Angels (1930), the epic aviation movie by Howard Hughes.

In 1982, a French film L'as des as (Ace of Aces) starring Jean-Paul Belmondo extensively used many anecdotes from Nungesser's life, mostly for comedic effect. In addition to dogfighting, his night life in Paris had become a legend of sorts.

A 1999 Canadian made-for-TV children's special movie, Dead Aviators (airing on U.S. cable TV as "Restless Spirits"), uses the mystery of the disappearance of The White Bird as the key plot device. A young girl, who struggles with her pilot-father's death in a plane crash years before, visits her grandmother in Newfoundland. While there, she encounters the ghosts of Nungesser and Coli, whose restless spirits constantly relive their own unheralded 1927 crash in a nearby pond. The girl decides to help the pair move onto the afterlife by assisting them in rebuilding their airplane and completing their flight so they may be released and, by doing so, works through her own emotional distress over her father's test flight death. The depiction of The White Bird and Nungesser's crest and dialog references to Nungesser's wartime achievements are very consistent with some published accounts.

In the Young Indiana Jones Chronicles episode Attack of the Hawkmen, Indiana Jones meets Nungesser (played by Patrick Toomey) when Jones, as a Belgian officer, is temporarily attached to the Lafayette Escadrille. Nungesser is depicted as the squadron's reckless, flamboyant and charismatic hero, who parties in Paris and duels with the Red Baron. Nungesser flies Jones in and out of Germany in a German biplane to accomplish an undercover spy mission concerning Dutch aircraft manufacturer Anthony Fokker (played by Craig Kelly), who was building new planes like the Fokker Dr.I for Germany's war effort.

== Citations of honors ==
Médaille militaire citation

"Brigadier of the 2nd Light Cavalry Regiment, on 3 September 1914, with his officer having been wounded during the course of a reconnaissance, he at first sheltered him, then with the assistance of several foot soldiers, after having replaced the disabled officer, he secured an auto and brought back the papers by crossing an area under fire by the enemy."

Chevalier de la Légion d'honneur citation, 4 December 1915

"Pilot[,] detached at his own request to an Escadrille in the rear, has never ceased since his arrival to seek any occasion to fly; flying up to four hours, thirty minutes each day in spite of the inclement weather. During the course of his last combat he gave proof of the highest moral qualities by approaching to within 10 meters the enemy machine he was pursuing firing in response up to the last moment. He succeeded in downing his adversary which caught fire and exploded in front of the French trenches."

Officier de la Légion d'honneur citation, 19 May 1918

"Incomparable pursuit pilot, with exceptional knowledge and magnificent bravery, which reflect the power and inflexible will of his ancestry. In the cavalry, where during his first engagements he earned the Médaille militaire, then in a groupe de bombardement where for his daily prowess he was cited several times in orders and was decorated with the Legion of Honor, and finally with an Escadrille de chasse, for thirty months his exploits were prodigious, and he always presented himself as a superb example of tenacity and audacity, displaying an arrogant contempt for death. Absent from the front several times because of crashes and wounds, his ferocious energy was not dampened, and he returned each time to the fray, with his spirit undaunted gaining victory after victory, finally becoming famous as the most feared adversary for German aviation. 31 enemy aircraft downed, three balloons flamed, two wounds, fifteen citations."

Other awards

- Croix de guerre (France) with 28 palms
- Order of Leopold (Belgium)
- Croix de guerre (Belgium)
- Distinguished Service Cross (United States)
- Military Cross (United Kingdom)
- War Cross (Portugal)
- Victory Medal
- 1914–1918 Commemorative war medal (France)
- Insignia for the Military Wounded
- Order of Karađorđe's Star (Serbia)
- Order of Prince Danilo I (Montenegro)
- Verdun Medal

== See also ==
- List of people who disappeared mysteriously at sea
- List of World War I flying aces

Preceded by Jean Navarre	Top Flying Ace; France, World War I	Succeeded by Jean Chaput
