= André Lévy =

André Lévy may refer to:

- André Lévy (sinologist) (1925–2017), French sinologist
- André Lévy (social psychologist)
- André Robert Lévy (1893–1973), World War I flying ace
