= Chai Nat (disambiguation) =

Chai Nat is a town in central Thailand.

Chai Nat (Thai: ชัยนาท; from Sanskrit Jayanāda जयनाद, "resounding of victory") can also refer to:

- Chai Nat Province, a province in Central Thailand
  - Mueang Chai Nat District, the main district of Chai Nat Province
  - Rangsit Prayurasakdi, also known as Prince of Chai Nat
- Chai Nat (city), an ancient city in present-day Phitsanulok Province

== See also ==
- Jainad mandal, mandal in Telangana, India
- André Julien Chainat, French World War I flying ace
