= Escadrille Spa.315 =

- Active: 1917–1918
- Country: France
- Branch: French Air Service
- Type: Fighter Squadron
- Battle honours: Mentioned in dispatches 26 October 1918

Escadrille Spa.315 (originally Escadrille N.311, Escadrille N.315) was a French fighter squadron founded in February 1917, during the First World War. Assigned to the defense of the city of Belfort on the Franco/German border, it shot down 21 enemy planes while taking only two losses. On 26 October 1918, they were Mentioned in dispatches for this feat.

== History ==
Founded in February 1917 with Nieuport fighters as Escadrille N.311, it was dissolved in June. It was reformed in VI Armee on 25 July, still with Nieuports, as Escadrille N.315. It was assigned to the defense of Belfort, France, near the German border.

It was designated Escadrille Spa.315 on 10 July 1918, signifying that it had been re-equipped with SPAD fighters. On 26 October 1918, the Commanding General of VI Armee commended the squadron in official orders for its excellence in downing 21 German airplanes with the loss of only two French aircraft.

== Commanding officers ==
- Capitaine Raoul Etienne

== Notable members ==
- Lieutenant Albert Chabrier
- Maréchal des logis Gilbert Uteau

== Aircraft ==
- Nieuports: February 1917 - 10 July 1918
- SPADs: 10 July 1918 - war's end
