= Rémy Stricker =

French musician

Rémy Stricker (3 January 1936 – 19 November 2019) was a French pianist, music educator, radio producer, musicologist and writer.

== Biography ==
Born in Mulhouse, Rémy Stricker studied the piano with Yvonne Lefébure, then at the Conservatoire de Paris. From 1964 to 1969, along Jean-Pierre Armengaud and Michel Capelier, he seconded Germaine Arbeau-Bonnefoy in the presentation of the Musigrains, pedagogical concerts-lectures given at the Théâtre des Champs-Élysées. Before being a professor of musical esthetics at the Conservatoire de Paris from 1971 to 2001, Rémy Stricker was a radio producer for France Musique and France Culture from 1962 to 1997.

In 2004, he was awarded the prix spécial du jury of the Prix des Muses for his book Berlioz dramaturge.

== Selected publications ==
- 1969: Musique du Baroque, Gallimard, ISBN 2070273830.
- 1980: Mozart et ses opéras : fiction et vérité, series Bibliothèque des Idées , Gallimard, 355p.
- 1993: Franz Liszt, les ténèbres de la gloire, series Bibliothèque des Idées, NRF – Gallimard, 482 p. ISBN 2-07-073353-X
- 1996: Robert Schumann : Le Musicien et la Folie. Gallimard. 1995. p. 252. ISBN 2070743543.
- 1996: les Mélodies de Duparc, Actes Sud ISBN 9782742706914.
- 1999: Georges Bizet : 1838-1875, Gallimard, Paris, 377 p. ISBN 2-07-074803-0.
- 2001: Le dernier Beethoven, series Bibliothèque des Idées, Gallimard, 328 p. ISBN 2-07-075849-4
- 2003: Berlioz dramaturge, series Bibliothèque des Idées, Gallimard, 664 p. ISBN 2-07-072367-4

== Bibliography ==
- Laurent Herz, Les Musigrains, une institution pédagogique et musicale (1939–1986), Éditions L'Harmattan, Paris, 2013 ISBN 978-2-343-02020-4
