= Les Adjots =

- Commune
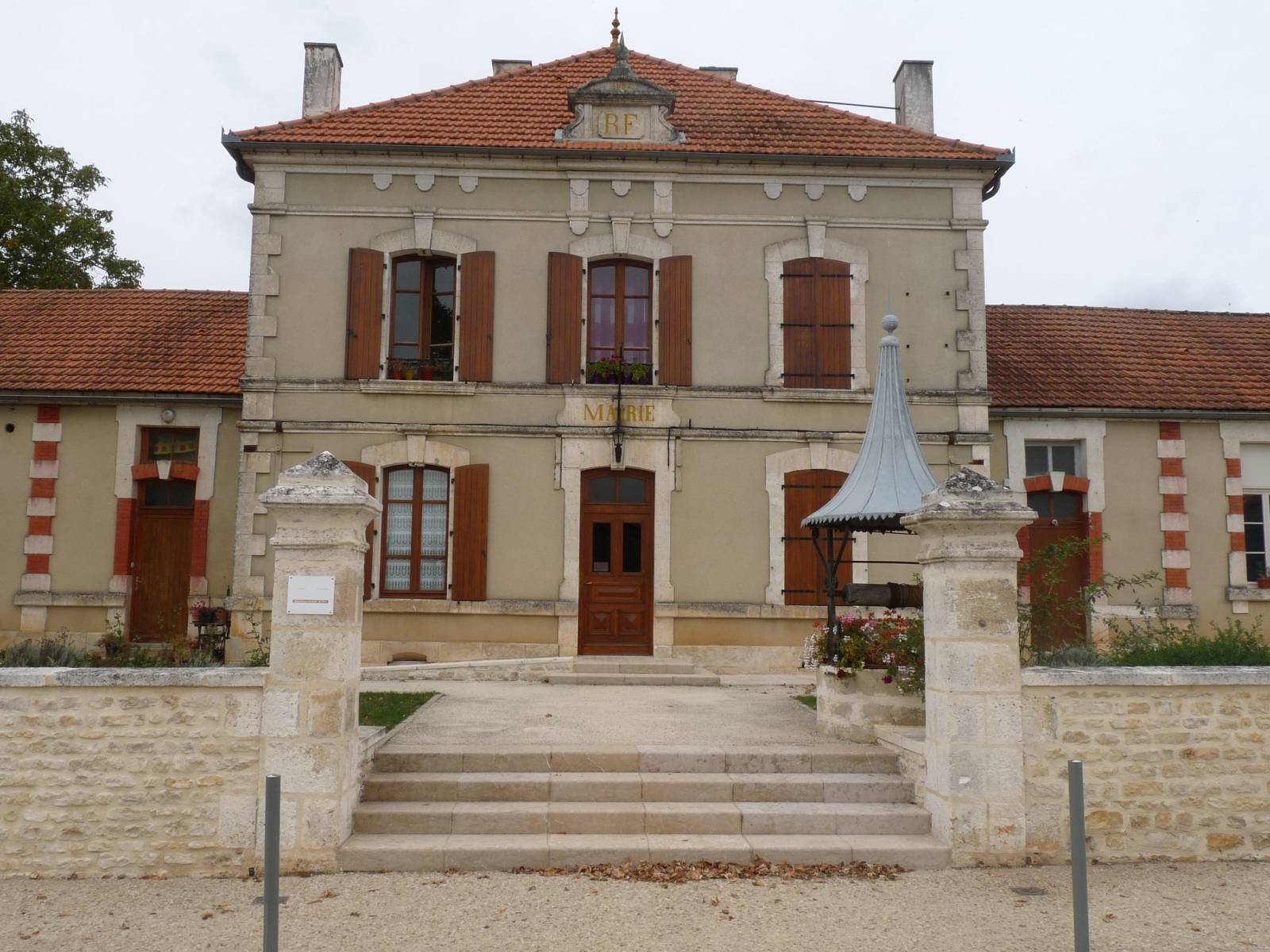
- Town hall
- Location of Les Adjots
- Location within France Location within Nouvelle-Aquitaine
- Coordinates: 46°04′39″N 0°12′26″E
- Country: France
- Region: Nouvelle-Aquitaine
- Department: Charente
- Arrondissement: Confolens
- Canton: Charente-Nord

Government
  - Mayor (2020–2026): Alain Dunoyer
- Area^{1}: 10.94 km^{2} (4.22 sq mi)
- Elevation: 130 m (430 ft)
- Highest elevation: 168 m (551 ft)
- Lowest elevation: 120 m (390 ft)
- Population (2023): 538
  - Density: 49.2/km^{2} (127/sq mi)
- Time zone: UTC+01:00 (CET)
  - Summer (DST): UTC+02:00 (CEST)
- INSEE/Postal code: 16002 /16700
- ^{1} French Land Register data, which excludes lakes, ponds, glaciers > 1 km^{2} (0.386 sq mi or 247 acres) and river estuaries.

Les Adjots (French pronunciation: [le.z‿adʒo]) is a commune in the Charente department in the Nouvelle-Aquitaine region of southwestern France.

== Geography ==
=== Location and access ===
Les Adjots is a commune located in the north of the department of Charente. It borders both neighbouring departments of Deux-Sèvres (northwest) and Vienne (north-east). It is located some 65 km south of Poitiers and 60 km north of Angoulême.

Traversed by the N10 west of the village running from north to south and by the parallel railway line along the eastern border of the commune, Les Adjots was on the road from Paris to Bordeaux as shown on plate 28 in the Atlas of Trudaine.

The departmental roads D911 passes through the commune close to the N10 from the north and continues south to Ruffec. The D176 also runs from the village south-east to Taize-Aizie and the D305 runs west to La Paiziere.

The railway line Paris-Austerlitz to Bordeaux Saint-Jean passes through the eastern boundary of the commune. Ruffec is the nearest station.

=== Hamlets and localities ===
Northwest of the town of Adjots, Chez Branger is the largest hamlet in the commune. It is located on the former N10. North of the town there are Chez Chagnaud and Chez Machet and to the south La Cour, Les Robins, and Les Loges. In the south-west the hamlet of La Batarderie is separated from the rest of the commune by the N10.

=== Neighbouring communes and villages ===
Source:

=== Geology and terrain ===
Geologically, the commune is located on Jurassic limestone of the Aquitaine Basin as is all of North-Charente. The Bathonian age appears on a small area east of the town, but the plateau is covered by alterite in the form of red flinty clay and locally by Oolite of iron south of the town.

The relief of the commune is that of a plateau with an average altitude of 140m. The highest point of the commune is at an altitude of 168m located on the north-western boundary. The lowest point is 120m located on the south-eastern boundary (Bois de Vallons). Due to the nature of the karst soil there are also some depressions and sinkholes. The village is 127m above sea level.

=== Hydrography ===
The town is located in the basin of the Charente but it has no watercourses or lakes.

=== Climate ===
As in three-quarters south and west of the department, the climate is oceanic Aquitaine, slightly degraded in the north of the department near the Seuil du Poitou.

=== Vegetation ===
The territory is composed of 69% of agricultural land, 27% forests and semi-natural areas, and 4% of artificial areas.

== Toponymy ==
Attested in the Latinized form De Adjotis meaning "The gorse" in 1280

The current spelling is explained by the medieval romanization of the old French word ajou (13th century) ajonc which actually dates back to the pre-Latin *ajaugone giving *ajon ( of where ajonc. It is spelt with a final C by analogy with jonc, from the Latin juncus) giving ajou.

There are at least two dialects in the region ajaillon and jogue (feminine form from *ajauga) more to the south.

== Administration ==
Created in 1793, Les Adjots passed from the arrondissement of Angoulême to the arrondissement of Confolens on 1 January 2008.

List of Successive Mayors of Les Adjots

From	To	Name	Party	Position
1995	2008	Josette Pacton		
2008	2020	Francis Grimaud	SE	Retired on Social Security
2020	2026	Alain Dunoyer		

== Demography ==
The inhabitants of the commune are known as Adjotois or Adjotoises in French. After losing 45% of its population from 1851 to 1921 Les Adjots stabilized its population between 390 and 530 inhabitants.

Historical population

Year	Pop.	±% p.a.
1793	661	—
1800	683	+0.47%
1806	646	−0.92%
1821	749	+0.99%
1831	896	+1.81%
1841	821	−0.87%
1846	864	+1.03%
1851	942	+1.74%
1856	879	−1.37%
1861	810	−1.62%
1866	781	−0.73%
1872	744	−0.81%
1876	727	−0.58%
1881	690	−1.04%
1886	690	+0.00%
1891	695	+0.14%
1896	601	−2.86%
1901	593	−0.27%

Year	Pop.	±% p.a.
1906	580	−0.44%
1911	562	−0.63%
1921	520	−0.77%
1926	512	−0.31%
1931	502	−0.39%
1936	494	−0.32%
1946	469	−0.52%
1954	512	+1.10%
1962	513	+0.02%
1968	488	−0.83%
1975	515	+0.77%
1982	453	−1.82%
1990	448	−0.14%
1999	390	−1.53%
2007	451	+1.83%
2012	526	+3.12%
2017	525	−0.04%
2023	538	+0.41%

Source: EHESS and INSEE

== Economy ==
Les Adjots is an agricultural commune with a few artisans, backhoe services, masons, and a painter.

In the village there is a grocery store.

== Facilities ==
=== Education ===
The school is an inter-communal teaching group between Les Adjots and Taizé-Aizie with each hosting an elementary school.

=== Medico-social ===
The IME Marc Signac is at La Tour.

=== Other services ===
Other services are found in Ruffec 8.5 km south.

== Life in Adjots ==
=== Sport ===
The football club is a union between Taizé-Aizie and Les Adjots.

=== Communal and Employers Festival ===
The communal festival is at Easter and the employers festival on the first Sunday after 14 July.

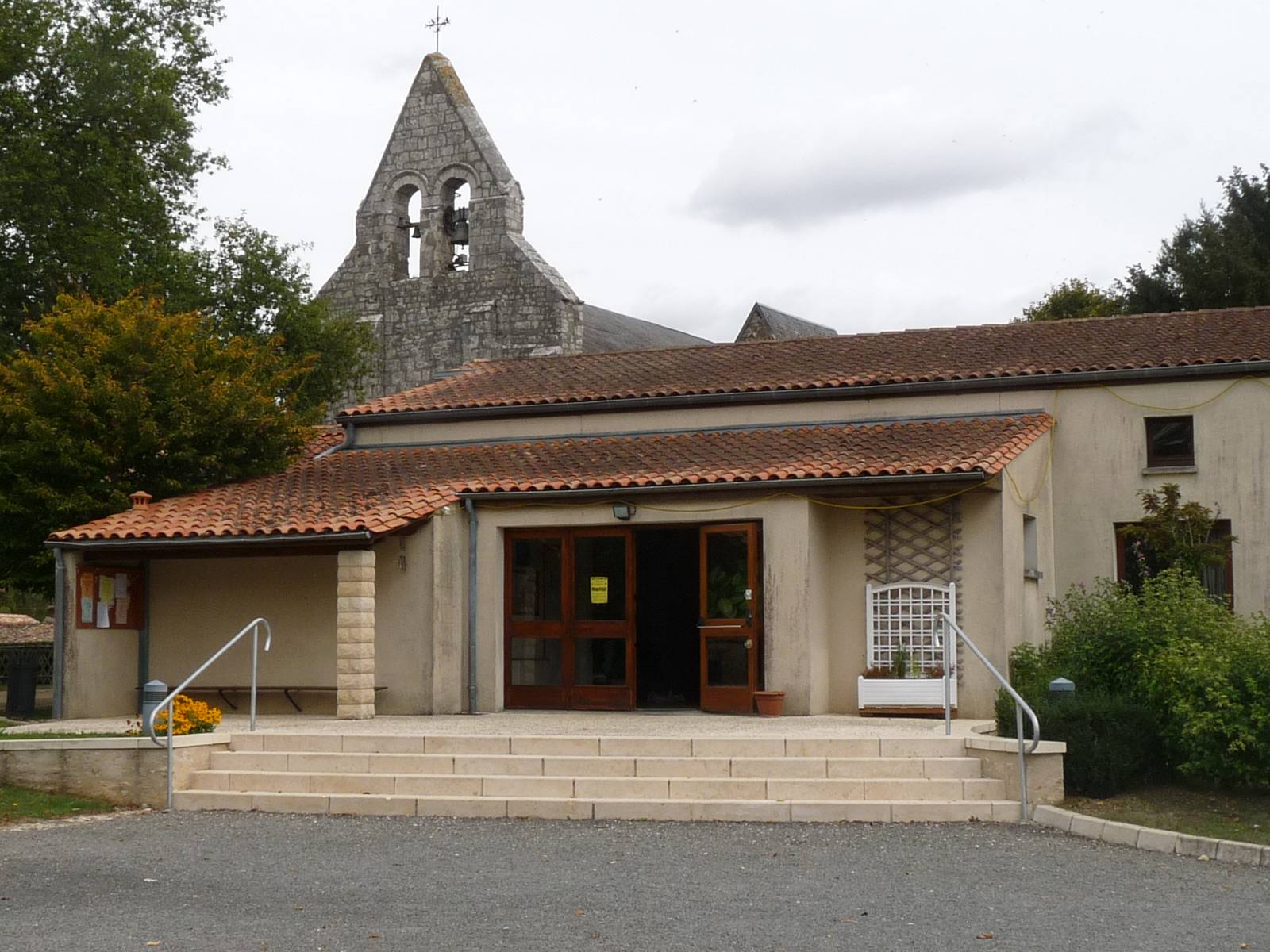
The Festival Hall

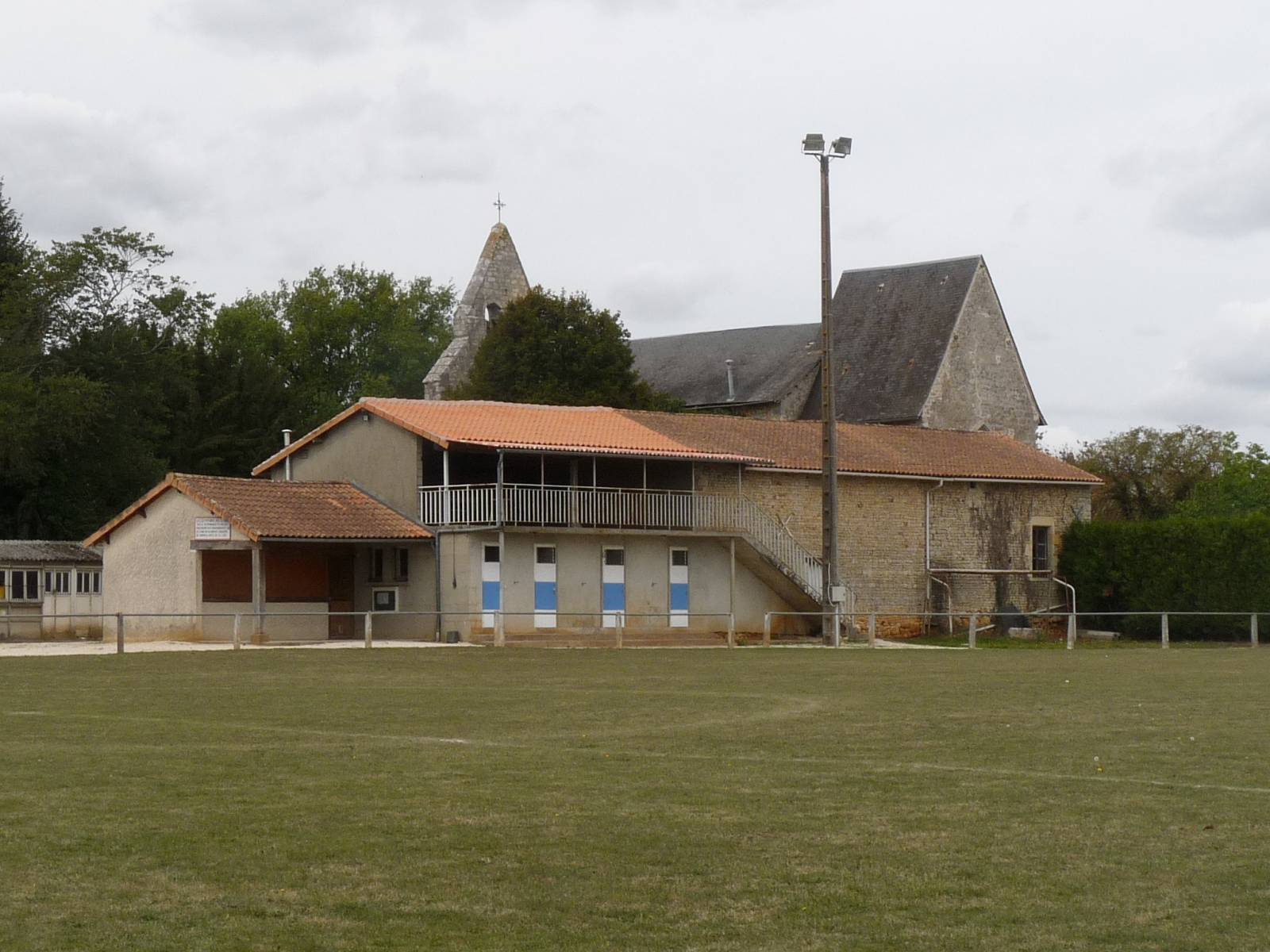
The Sports Ground

== Sites and Monuments ==
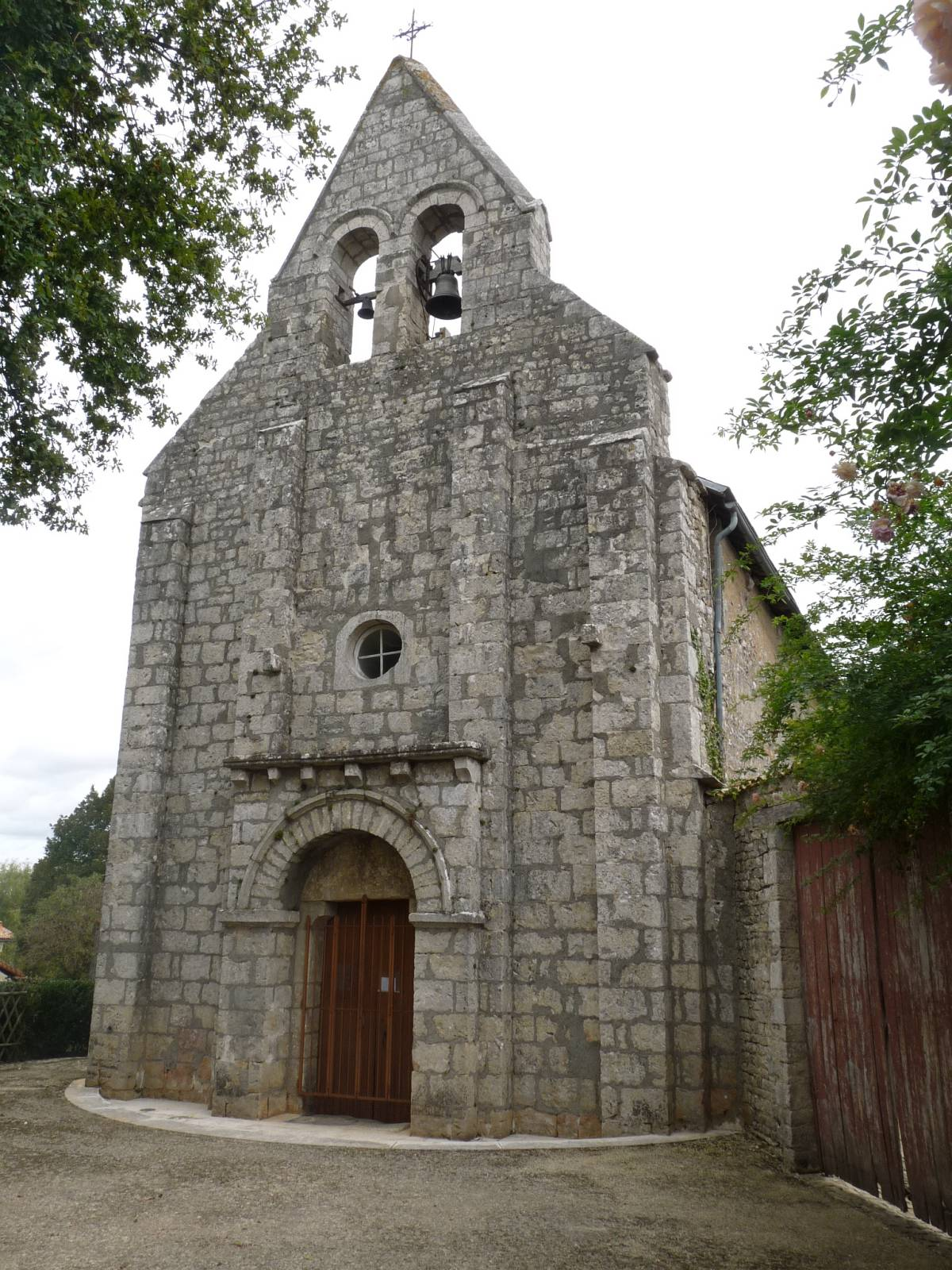
The Church of Adjots

- The Church, a parish of the former diocese of Poitiers, dates from the 12th and 13th centuries and was restored in the 19th century.
- The Pavillon Tower dates from the 17th century.

== Notable People linked to the commune ==
- Auguste Merle (1855–1940), mayor of Saint-Junien, President of the Chamber of Notaries.

== See also ==
- Communes of the Charente department
