= Jacques Gérard =

- Born: 26 October 1890; Paris, France
- Died: 3 July 1918 (aged 27)
- Military career
- Allegiance: France
- Branch: Infantry; aviation
- Rank: Adjutant
- Units: 113th Regiment of Infantry; Escadrille 18; Escadrille 65
- Awards: Médaille militaire, Croix de Guerre with five Palmes

Adjutant Jacques Gérard (1890–1918) was a French World War I flying ace. He was credited with eight confirmed aerial victories before dying while battling to liberate his homeland.

== Early life ==
Jacques Gérard was born in Paris, France, on 26 October 1890. He joined the 113e Regiment d'Infanterie to defend his country during World War I.

== World War I ==
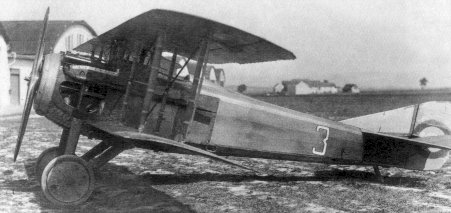
A SPAD SVII in the 1920s – Jacques Gérard scored his eight victories with a similar biplane fighter aircraft.

Once he had joined the infantry, he found himself assigned as a mechanic and driver. This work brought him in contact with the truck-borne laboratories used for developing aerial photography. An assignment to Escadrille C18 of the Aéronautique Militaire followed. He subsequently entered pilot's training, and was licensed with his brevet in August 1917. He then rounded off his aviation education with advanced training at Pau and Cazaux. Upon completion of training, he was assigned to Escadrille N65 as a pilot on 10 November 1917. By this time, he had risen to corporal.

He was promoted to sergeant on 25 January 1918, and scored his first aerial victory on 30 January while flying a Spad VII. His victory tally mounted until he became an ace on 23 April, when he downed a brace of German reconnaissance planes. This action brought him the award of the Médaille militaire. The accompanying citation read (in English translation):

He...battles with great bravery, never abandoning a fight, often far and low in enemy lines, until he is out of ammunition or his adversary is conquered.

On 25 June 1918, the date of his seventh confirmed victory, he was promoted to Adjutant. He would score one more confirmed victory. Then, on 3 July 1918, he was killed in action while battling five German airplanes.

== List of aerial victories ==
See also Aerial victory standards of World War I

Numbered victories in following table denote confirmed victories in chronological order. The notation "u/c" marks unconfirmed claims.

No.	Date/time	Aircraft	Foe	Result	Location	Notes
1	30 January 1918	Spad VII fighter serial number S4236	German airplane	Destroyed	Beine, France	Victory shared with Jules Covin and two of his wingmen from Escadrille Spa31
2	31 March 1918	Spad VII s/n S4236	German fighter	Destroyed	Lagny, France	Victory shared with Charles Nungesser
3	21 April 1918	Spad VII s/n S4236	German reconnaissance two-seater	Destroyed	Etelfay, France	Victory shared with Georges Lienhart
4	23 April 1918	Spad VII s/n S4236	German reconnaissance two-seater	Destroyed	North of Le Ployron, France	Victory shared with another French pilot
5		Spad VII s/n S4236	German reconnaissance two-seater	Destroyed	Rollot, France	
6	6 June 1918	Spad VII s/n S4236	German airplane	Destroyed	Longpont, France	
7	25 June 1918	Spad VII s/n S4236	German airplane	Destroyed		
8	28 June 1918	Spad VII s/n S4236	Albatros	Destroyed	Chaudun, France	
u/c		Spad VII s/n S4236				
u/c		Spad VII s/n S4236				
