= René Pelissier =

René Alphonse Pelissier
- Born: 30 April 1886; Versailles, France
- Died: 27 March 1969 (aged 82); Paris, France
- Military career
- Allegiance: France
- Branch: Infantry; aviation
- Rank: Sous lieutenant
- Units: Escadrille C.53; Escadrille C.202; Escadrille N.155
- Commands: Escadrille Spa.175
- Awards: Legion d'honneur Médaille militaire Croix de Guerre

René Alphonse Pelissier was born on 30 April 1886 in Versailles, France.

On 2 August 1914, he was called to serve as an infantryman. He was promoted rapidly through the enlisted ranks until he was wounded on 30 April 1915. Rendered unfit for infantry service, he began pilot's training on 17 August 1915. On 14 January 1916, he graduated with his Military Pilot's Brevet. He reported for his first posting on 8 March 1916, to fly a Caudron for Escadrille C.53. He was wounded on 30 April and sent to hospital. Upon his return, he reported to Escadrille C.202 on 17 June 1916, again as a Caudron pilot. On 29 July, he shot down a German Fokker for his first aerial victory.

On 26 October 1916, Pelissier was pulled from combat duty to become an aviation instructor. Although there is no record of his reassignment from teaching, on 28 June 1917, he shot down an observation balloon for his fourth victory. On 6 January 1918, he was posted to Escadrille N.155. On 20 April 1918, he was commissioned into the officer's ranks as a Sous lieutenant. On 1 September 1918, he was granted command of Escadrille Spa.175. With them, he scored his sixth and last win on 16 September 1918.

The records of his aerial combats are both incomplete and contradictory. Escadrille N.155—which by 1918 was actually Escadrille Spa.155—claims that Pelissier scored five of his six victories with them. However, Escadrille C.202 says he scored four victories while with them—two on unknown dates in 1916. And his victory over an observation balloon with a Caudron bomber from C.202 seems unlikely. However it is agreed he shot down six enemy aircraft.

Regardless of confusion over his victories, Pelissier flew 694 hours of combat during World War I. For his valor, he was awarded the Croix de Guerre with five palmes and an etoile de argent, plus the Médaille militaire. On 29 September 1918, he was inducted into the Legion d'honneur.

René Alphonse Pelissier died in Paris on 27 March 1969.
