= Paul Montange =

French flying ace

- Born: 20 February 1892; Belleville-sur-Saône, France
- Died: 4 October 1963 (aged 71); Lyon, France
- Burial place: Belleville-sur-Saône, France
- Military career
- Allegiance: France
- Branch: Flying service
- Rank: Adjutant
- Unit: Escadrille Spa.155
- Awards: Légion d'honneur Médaille militaire Croix de Guerre

Sergeant Paul Montange (1892-1963) was a French World War I flying ace credited with five aerial victories.

== Biography ==
=== Early life and prewar military service ===
Paul Montange was born in Belleville-sur-Saône, France, on 20 February 1892.

On 19 November 1910, he volunteered for a three-year enlistment in the military, and became a Chasseur. Exactly three years later he was released to the reserves, only to be recalled to active duty for the First World War.

=== World War I service ===
On 23 January 1915, he was transferred from the cavalry to become a combat engineer and infantryman. On 5 March 1917, he began pilot training. On 9 May 1917, he graduated primary training and received his Military Pilot's Brevet. After advanced instruction, Montange was posted to Escadrille N.155 on 2 July 1917.

On 20 May 1918, Montange shot down two German airplanes. On 2 September 1918, he shot down a German reconnaissance machine and an observation balloon. On 23 September, he shot down a fifth German aircraft to become an ace.

On 1 October 1918, Montange was promoted to adjutant. When the shooting halted on 11 November 1918, he had logged 400 combat hours and for his valor had been awarded the Croix de Guerre with two palmes, an etoile de vermeil, an etoile d'argent, and an etoile de bronze.

=== Post World War I ===
Paul Montange was awarded the Médaille militaire on 2 January 1928.

On 28 December 1934, he was made a Chevalier in the Légion d'honneur.

Paul Montange died in Lyon, France, on 4 December 1943.
