= Vial (surname) =

Vial is a French, English, and Italian surname. Notable people with the surname include:

- Del Vial (1891–?), French World War I flying ace
- Dennis Vial (born 1969), Canadian ice hockey player
- Laurent Vial (born 1959), Swiss cyclist
- Leigh Vial (1909–1943), Australian patrol officer and explorer
- Manuel Camilo Vial (1804–1882), Chilean politician
- Noelle Vial (1959–2003), Irish poet
- Octavio Vial (1918–1989), French football manager
- Patrick Vial (born 1946), French judoka
- Pedro Vial (ca. 1746–1814) French explorer in North America
- Pierre-Alexandre Vial (born 1975), French decathlete
- Stéphane Vial (born 1973), French shot putter
