= Gustave Naudin =

WW1 French flying ace

- Born: 29 May 1890; Corberon, France
- Died: 16 April 1978 (aged 87)
- Military career
- Allegiance: France
- Branch: Aviation
- Rank: Adjutant
- Unit: Escadrille 26
- Awards: Légion d'honneur (two classes), Médaille militaire, Croix de Guerre (both 1914 and 1939 editions)

Captain Gustave Naudin (29 May 1890–16 April 1978) was a French World War I flying ace credited with six aerial victories. He returned to his nation's defense during World War II, serving as an infantry officer.

== Early life ==
Gustave Naudin was born in Corberon, France on 29 May 1890.

== Military service in World War I ==
=== Service in the cavalry ===
Naudin enlisted in the cavalry for four years on 13 April 1909. Exactly four years later, he was remanded to the reserves. On 4 August 1914, he was recalled to active duty with the 16th Regiment de Chasseurs. Promoted to Maréchal des logis on 17 March 1915, he was transferred to the 408th Regiment d'Infanterie the next day.

=== Service in aviation ===
On 19 May 1916, Naudin began pilot's training. He qualified for his Pilot's Brevet on 22 October 1916. He then received advanced training before being posted to Escadrille N26 on 4 February 1917. On 12 July, while flying a Caudron, he and his observer scored an aerial victory. His Medaille Militaire award of 13 August for this action read:

"Pilot who through his spirit, ability, courage and contempt for danger, won everyone's admiration. On 12 July 1917, he resolutely attacked a group of three enemy aircraft which were flying over their lines and downed one of them. Taking off a second time the same day, to carry out aircraft spotting, he was wounded by shrapnel but he completed his mission in spite of a violent bombardment. Already cited in orders."

After his first aerial victory of 12 July 1917, he was promoted to Adjutant on 25 July. Over the next year, Naudin would score five more aerial victories. On 20 August 1918, he was promoted to Adjutant Chef. While on a trench strafing mission on 29 September, he was wounded by ground fire. He was appointed as a Chevalier de la Legion d'honneur on 8 November 1918.

Gustave Naudin had flown 603 1/2 hours during the war.

== World War II military service ==
Gustave Naudin returned to his nation's defense for World War II. He was promoted to Capitaine. On 9 September 1944, he was wounded in an infantry action. For his gallant service, he was awarded another Croix de Guerre; he was also raised to Officier de la Legion d'Honneur.

== Post World War II ==
Gustav Naudin died on 16 April 1978.

== Awards and decorations ==
- Officier de la Legion d'Honneur: During World War II
- Chevalier de la Legion d'honneur: 8 November 1918
- Medaille Militaire: 13 August 1917
- Croix de Guerre with five palmes and an etoile vermeil: During World War I
- Croix de guerre with an etoile d'argent: During World War II

== Bibliography ==
- Franks, Norman and Frank Bailey (2008). Over The Front: The Complete Record of the Fighter Aces and Units of the United States and French Air Services, 1914-1918 . Grub Street Publishing. ISBN 0948817542 ISBN 978-0948817540
- Guttman, Jon (2001). Spad VII Aces of World War I (Osprey Aircraft of the Aces No 39). Osprey Publishing. ISBN 1841762229, ISBN 978-1841762227.
