= Constant Soulier =

French World War I flying ace

Constant Frederic Soulier
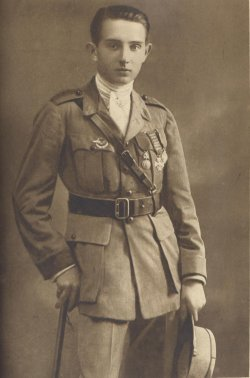
- Born: 5 September 1897; Paris, France
- Died: 2 July 1933 (aged 35); Maisons-Laffitte, France
- Military career
- Allegiance: France
- Branch: Aviation
- Service years: 1915 - 1918
- Rank: Maréchal-des-logis
- Unit: Escadrille 26
- Awards: Médaille Militaire; Croix de Guerre with six palmes and an etoile de vermeil Romanian Croix de Virtu Militaire

Maréchal-des-logis Constant Frédéric Soulier was a World War I flying ace credited with six confirmed aerial victories and nine unconfirmed.

== Biography ==
See also Aerial victory standards of World War I

Constant Frédéric Soulier was born in Paris on 5 September 1897.

Soulier was a high school student, candidate at the École Polytechnique when the war began. His first attempts to join the military were frustrated by his ill health and his minority, as he was only seventeen years old. Soulier managed to join the artillery in March 1915, but then wangled a transfer to aviation. He began aviation training at Pau in March 1916, and was brevetted a pilot two months later. He was posted to Escadrille 26 under command of Commandant Brocard in June 1916. He began his aerial victories as a balloon buster, destroying a German observation balloon on 24 August 1916. He had two additional wins before he began a prolonged hospital stay in January 1917. He returned to duty in March, and in May shot down two more enemy planes. On 27 May, Soulier became the youngest ace in French service, his predecessor, Paul Sauvage, having been killed in action. Soulier returned to hospital at the end of June 1917, and remained there until December. His illness ended his combat duty. He was sent to the United States to demonstrate combat flying to American pilots. He made a favorable impression on this public relations trip, being referred to as short and boyish, but solemn and self-assured. He was attributed with 430 flying hours and 60 dogfights. But suffering PTSD, he discovered cocaïne in USA and became a drug addict and an alcoholic. He died prematurely at age 33, having never dropped his addictions.

== Honors and awards ==
Médaille Militaire

"Voluntarily enlisted for the duration of the war. Has shown himself to be an excellent pursuit pilot, skillful as well as audacious. Has had numerous combats during the course of which he has downed three enemy aircraft and forced four others to fall disabled." (Médaille Militaire citation, 8 March 1917)

Croix de guerre with six palmes and a etoile de vermeil.

Romanian Croix de Virtu Militaire

== Links ==
- (in French) Complete biography, list of victoires and color profiles of his airplanes
