= Taizé-Aizie =

- Commune
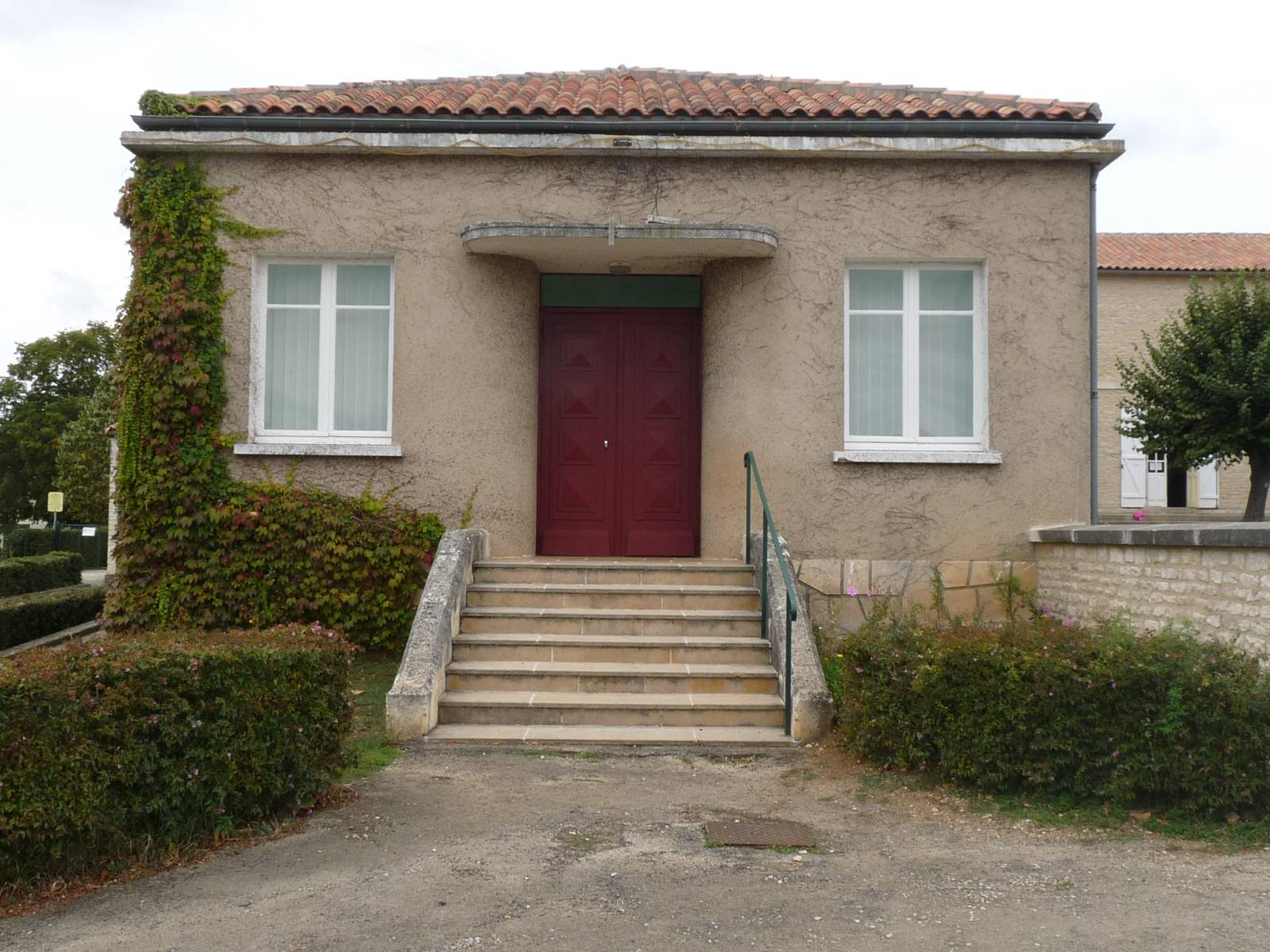
- Town hall
- Location of Taizé-Aizie
- Location within France Location within Nouvelle-Aquitaine
- Coordinates: 46°03′49″N 0°14′29″E
- Country: France
- Region: Nouvelle-Aquitaine
- Department: Charente
- Arrondissement: Confolens
- Canton: Charente-Nord
- Intercommunality: Val de Charente

Government
  - Mayor (2020–2026): Danièle Dorfiac
- Area^{1}: 14.81 km^{2} (5.72 sq mi)
- Elevation: 124 m (407 ft)
- Highest elevation: 163 m (535 ft)
- Lowest elevation: 83 m (272 ft)
- Population (2023): 593
  - Density: 40.0/km^{2} (104/sq mi)
- Time zone: UTC+01:00 (CET)
  - Summer (DST): UTC+02:00 (CEST)
- INSEE/Postal code: 16378 /16700
- ^{1} French Land Register data, which excludes lakes, ponds, glaciers > 1 km^{2} (0.386 sq mi or 247 acres) and river estuaries.

Taizé-Aizie (French pronunciation: [tɛze ezi]) is a commune in the Charente department in southwestern France.

== Population ==
Historical population
Year	Pop.	±% p.a.
1968	408	—
1975	412	+0.14%
1982	485	+2.36%
1990	544	+1.45%
1999	564	+0.40%
2007	562	−0.04%
2012	587	+0.87%
2017	577	−0.34%
2023	593	+0.46%
Source: INSEE

== See also ==
- Communes of the Charente department
