= Paul Gastin =

French flying ace

Paul Adrien Gastin
- Born: 8 November 1886; Avignon, France
- Died: 23 August 1976 (aged 89); Nice, France
- Military career
- Allegiance: France
- Branch: Hussars; aviation
- Service years: 1907 - ?
- Rank: Capitaine, later General
- Units: Escadrille 12; Escadrille Spa49
- Commands: Escadrille 84; Groupe de Combat 23
- Awards: Legion d'Honneur, Croix de Guerre

Capitaine Paul Adrien Gastin (8 November 1886 – 23 August 1976) was a World War I French flying ace credited with six confirmed aerial victories and four probable ones. Having attained command of both a squadron and a wing, and reaching the rank of captain by war's end, he remained in service. After postings to Morocco and Tunisia, he rose to the rank of general.

== Biography ==
See also Aerial victory standards of World War I

Paul Adrien Gastin was born on 8 November 1886 in Vaucluse, France. He began his mandated military service on 1 October 1907. After a couple of promotions within the enlisted ranks, he was commissioned into the reserves as a Sous lieutenant on 1 April 1909. By the time the First World War began in 1914, and he was recalled to active duty, Gastin was a full lieutenant.

Detached from the 9th Regiment de Chausseurs on 24 February 1915, he was posted to aviation duties. On 1 September 1915, his student pilot days were capped with the award of Military Pilot's Brevet No. 1484. After advanced training, he was assigned to Escadrille N.49 on 15 January 1916.

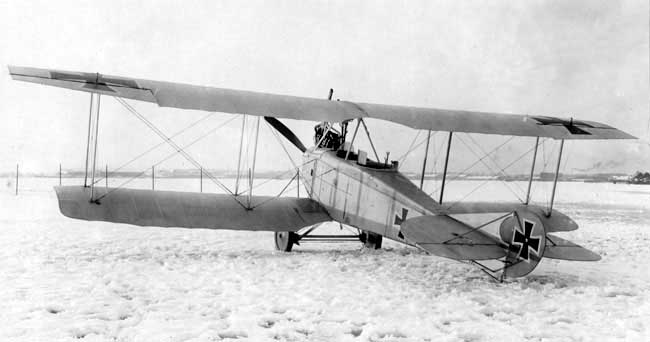
Paul Gastin's first victory was over an Aviatik--probably the C.I variant seen here.

On 22 May 1916, before aerial victories had become common occurrences, Gastin scored his first victory, over a German Aviatik.

January 1917 was a busy month for Gastin. He scored his fourth and fifth confirmed victories, on the 23rd and 28rd; then on the 31st, he was assigned to command Escadrille N.84. He would not score his last victory until 17 August 1918. A week later, he was promoted from squadron command to leadership of a wing, Groupe de Combat 23.

After war's end, Gastin served in Morocco and Tunisia and rose from captain to general. By the time of his death in Nice on 23 August 1976, he had risen to Commandeur of the Legion d'Honneur. He had also been granted the Croix de Guerre with eight palmes and an etoile de bronze.

== Aerial victories ==
Date	Unit	Aircraft	Opponent	Location
22 May 1916	N49		Aviatik	Sentheim
23 Oct 1916	N49		Aviatik	Cernay
01 Nov 1916	N49		EA	Altkirch
23 Jan 1917	N49		EA	NW of Altkirch
28 Jan 1917	N49		Albatros C	Soppe
17 Aug 1918	Spa84		EA	Dreslincourt
