= Noël de Rochefort =

Noel Hugues Anne Louis de Rochefort
- Born: 25 December 1889; Cerdon, Loiret, France
- Died: 16 September 1916 (aged 26)
- Military career
- Allegiance: France
- Branch: Aviation
- Rank: Sous lieutenant
- Unit: Escadrille 26
- Awards: Légion d'honneur, Médaille militaire Croix de Guerre

Sous Lieutenant Noël Hugues Anne Louis de Rochefort was a French World War I flying ace credited with seven aerial victories. He was one of the original French aces.

== Biography ==
Noël Hugues Anne Louis de Rochefort was born in Cerdon, Loiret, France on 25 December 1887.

Rochefort's first duty in the military was as a driver. He was ill and in hospital for several months from November 1914 on. Upon recuperation, he applied for aviation service and earned his Military Pilot's Brevet on 14 August 1915. In October 1915, he was assigned to Escadrille 26. He scored his first victory on 12 March 1916, and by 14 September, he had six enemy airplanes and an observation balloon to his credit, along with five unconfirmed claims. The following day, 15 September, he was shot down and wounded. He died of his wounds the next day while in German captivity.

== Honors and awards ==
Chevalier de la Légion d'honneur

"Sergent pilot of an army escadrille. A pilot of remarkable audacity and skill. On 22 May 1916, he pursued an enemy plane and downed it after a difficult combat. Already cited in army orders and the Médaille militaire for having downed two enemy planes previously." (Légion d'honneur citation, 10 June 1916)

Médaille militaire

"Sergent pilot. An ardent, skillful and tenacious pilot who has always given proof of great maturity, spirit and admirable courage. He has completed brilliantly all the reconnaissance and pursuit missions which were assigned him and has had numerous engagements with enemy planes. On 12 March 1916, he had two combats; during the course of one of them he allowed his observer to down a plane in the enemy lines." (Médaille militaire citation, 5 April 1916)

== Sources of information ==
Preceded by André Julien Chainat	Top Flying Ace; France, World War I	Succeeded by Alfred Heurtaux
