= Escadrille Spa.155 =

- Active: 1917–1918
- Country: France
- Branch: French Air Service
- Type: Fighter Squadron
- Battle honours: Mentioned in dispatches

Escadrille Spa.155 (originally Escadrille N.155) was a French fighter squadron active from 12 July 1917 through the end of World War I on 11 November 1917. Refitted with SPADs and renamed Escadrille Spa.155, it was bundled into the larger Groupe de Combat 18 in January 1918. The squadron campaigned with the Groupe as it supported several field armies during mid-1918. The squadron was Mentioned in dispatches on 4 October 1918. By war's end Escadrille Spa.155 was credited with the destruction of 13 enemy airplanes and an observation balloon.

== History ==
Escadrille N.155 was established with Nieuport XXIV aircraft on 12 July 1917 at Montdesir, France. The squadron was updated to Nieuport XXVII fighters in November, then re-equipped with SPADs the next month. The latter change caused a squadron renaming to Escadrille Spa.155.

In late January 1918, the squadron was one of four banded into Groupe de Combat 18. The Groupe, including Escadrille Spa.155, operated in support of half a dozen French field armies during mid-1918. In early September 1918, it was tasked to the American 1st Army for the Battle of Saint-Mihiel. In the aftermath of the Saint-Mihiel offensive, the Groupe moved to support IV Armee on 24 September 1918. That was its last move of the war.

On 4 October 1918, the squadron was Mentioned in dispatches. Escadrille Spa.155 was credited with destroying 12 enemy airplanes and an observation balloon.

== Commanding officers ==
- Lieutenant Edmond George: 12 July 1917 - 27 October 1918
- Lieutenant Labitte: 27 October 1918 - 8 November 1918
- Lieutenant Rondot: 8 November 1918

== Notable member ==
- Sous lieutenant René Pelissier

== Aircraft ==
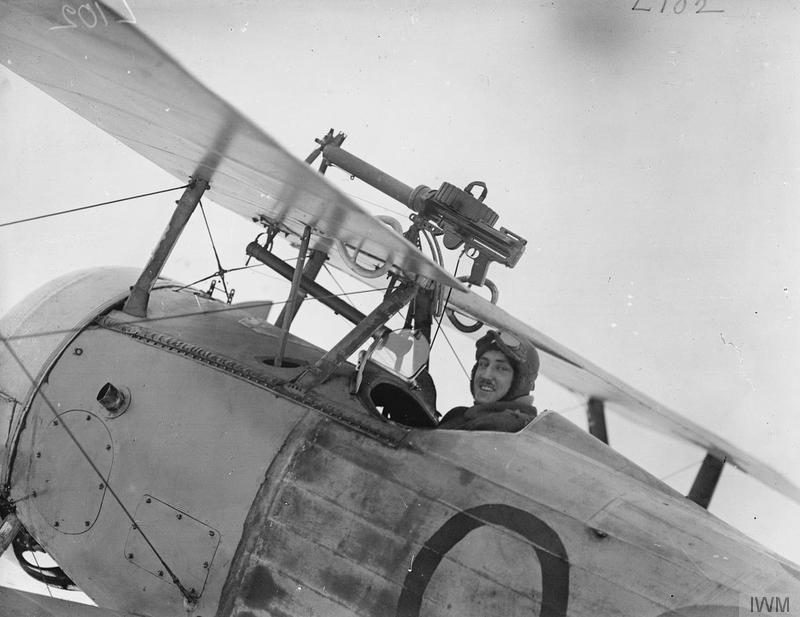
A Nieuport XXVII swings into action. Pilot unknown.

- Nieuport XXIV:17 July 1917 - November 1017
- Nieuport XXVII: November - December 1917
- SPADs: December 1917 onwards
