= Pierre Wertheim =

Pierre Armand Wertheim alias Pierre Armand Wertheimer
- Born: 17 March 1888; Paris, France
- Died: 30 April 1971 (aged 83); Paris, France
- Military career
- Allegiance: France
- Branch: Aviation
- Rank: Capitaine
- Unit: Escadrille N.84
- Commands: Escadrille Spa.84
- Awards: Legion d'Honneur; Croix de Guerre

Capitaine Pierre Armand Wertheim, alias Pierre Armand Wertheimer, (17 March 1888 – 30 April 1971) was a French World War I flying ace credited with five aerial victories.

== Biography ==
See also Aerial victory standards of World War I

Pierre Armand Wertheim was born on 17 March 1888 in Paris.

He began his required military service on 7 October 1909, becoming an infantryman. On 24 September 1911, he was released to reserve duty. The start of World War I saw him recalled to duty. However, on 8 August 1914, he went to hospital. He returned to his regiment in a few days, being tasked as a machine gunner. He served in that role until 30 March 1916, when he was sent for pilot training.

Wertheim graduated primary training with his Military Pilot's Brevet on 9 September 1916. After advanced training, he was posted to Escadrille N.84 on 3 February 1917. On 5 December 1917, he was raised from the enlisted ranks to the rank of temporary Sous lieutenant.

Wertheim shot down a German two-seated airplane with his SPAD on 16 February 1918, then downed a couple of Fokker Dr.1 triplanes on 31 March. On 20 April, he became a permanent Sous lieutenant. The next day, he teamed with Lieutenant Jean Chaput to down a Pfalz D.III fighter for a fourth victory.

On 3 August 1918, Wertheim was inducted into the Legion d'honneur. On the 28th, he was given command of his squadron, which had been outfitted with SPADs to become Escadrille Spa.84. On 9 September 1918, he was promoted to temporary Lieutenant. On 10 October 1918, he managed the highly hazardous task of destroying an observation balloon, to become an ace.

Pierre Wertheim also served during World War II in the rank of Capitaine.

== Honors and awards ==
- Chevalier of the Legion d'honneur awarded 3 August 1918
- Appointed Officer of the Legion d'honneur on 24 December 1936
- Decreed Commander of the Legion d'honneur on 13 July 1961
- Croix de Guerre with four palmes and three etoiles de vermeil

== Bibliography ==
- Franks, Norman; Bailey, Frank (1993). Over the Front: The Complete Record of the Fighter Aces and Units of the United States and French Air Services, 1914–1918. London, UK: Grub Street Publishing.
