= Escadrille Spa.84 =

- Active: 1917–1918
- Country: France
- Branch: French Air Service
- Type: Fighter Squadron
- Battle honours: Mentioned in dispatches

Escadrille Spa.84 (originally Escadrille N.84) was a French fighter squadron active in World War I during 1917 and 1918. They were credited with destroying 24 German airplanes and one observation balloon.

== History ==
Escadrille Spa.84 was founded on 6 January 1917 at Ravenal, France. It was principally equipped with Nieuport 24s, though it had some SPAD S.7s. On 22 March, it was incorporated into Groupe de Combat 13, posted to III Armee. The groupe would be exchanged between armies half a dozen times during the course of the war.

By February 1918, the unit had become Escadrille Spa.84 because it was wholly outfitted with SPAD 13 fighters. It was Mentioned in dispatches on 10 September 1918. By the Armistice on 11 November 1918, it was credited with destruction of 24 German airplanes and an observation balloon.

== Commanding officers ==
- Lieutenant Paul Gastin: 6 January 1917 - 28 July 1917
- Lieutenant Andre Humieres: 28 July 1917 - 6 November 1917
- Lieutenant Paul Gastin: 6 November 1917 - 28 August 1918
- Sous lieutenant Pierre Wertheim: 28 August 1918 - 11 November 1918

== Notable members ==
- Sous lieutenant Omer Demeuldre
- Sous lieutenant Pierre Wertheim

== Aircraft ==
- Nieuport 24s: 6 January 1917 - early 1918
- SPAD S.7s: 6 January 1917 - early 1918
- SPAD 13s: Early 1918
