= Laurent Bonnefoy =

French political scientist

Laurent Bonnefoy is a CNRS researcher and author at CERI Sciences Po, Paris. He is a specialist in the politics of the Arabian Peninsula. His book, Yemen and the World: Beyond Insecurity, won the Académie française's Prix Eugène Colas.

== Selected publications ==
- Salafism in Yemen: Transnationalism and Religious Identity. Hurst & Co., London, 2011.
- Yemen and the World: Beyond Insecurity. Hurst & Co., London, 2018. ISBN 9781849049665
