= Carole Chabrier =

Franco-Monegasque radio-TV personality (born 1947)

Charlotte Barale (born 1947), known professionally as Carole Chabrier, is a Franco-Monegasque television presenter, who has broadcast on the networks Office de Radiodiffusion Télévision Française, TF1, TMC, and RMC.

Chabrier was born in Paris but lives and works in Monaco. She is best known for her work as a broadcaster on Radio Monte Carlo, as well as on several French and Monegasque television networks. Her shows have included Le Monde de l'accordéon on ORTF and Réponse à tout on TF1. She has also worked in print journalism, including as chief editor of the magazine Monte Carlo Méditerranée.

From 1975 to 1979, she served as Monaco's commentator at the annual Eurovision Song Contest. In 1988, she published a cookbook containing recipes from her listeners and from chefs in the south of France, titled La Cuisine de Carole Chabrier : 400 bonnes recettes pour tous les goüts. She has also worked as a commentator for the French OK Corral theme park.

In 2019, she was honored as a Knight in the Order of Saint-Charles by Monaco's Prince Albert II.
