= Corberon =

- Commune
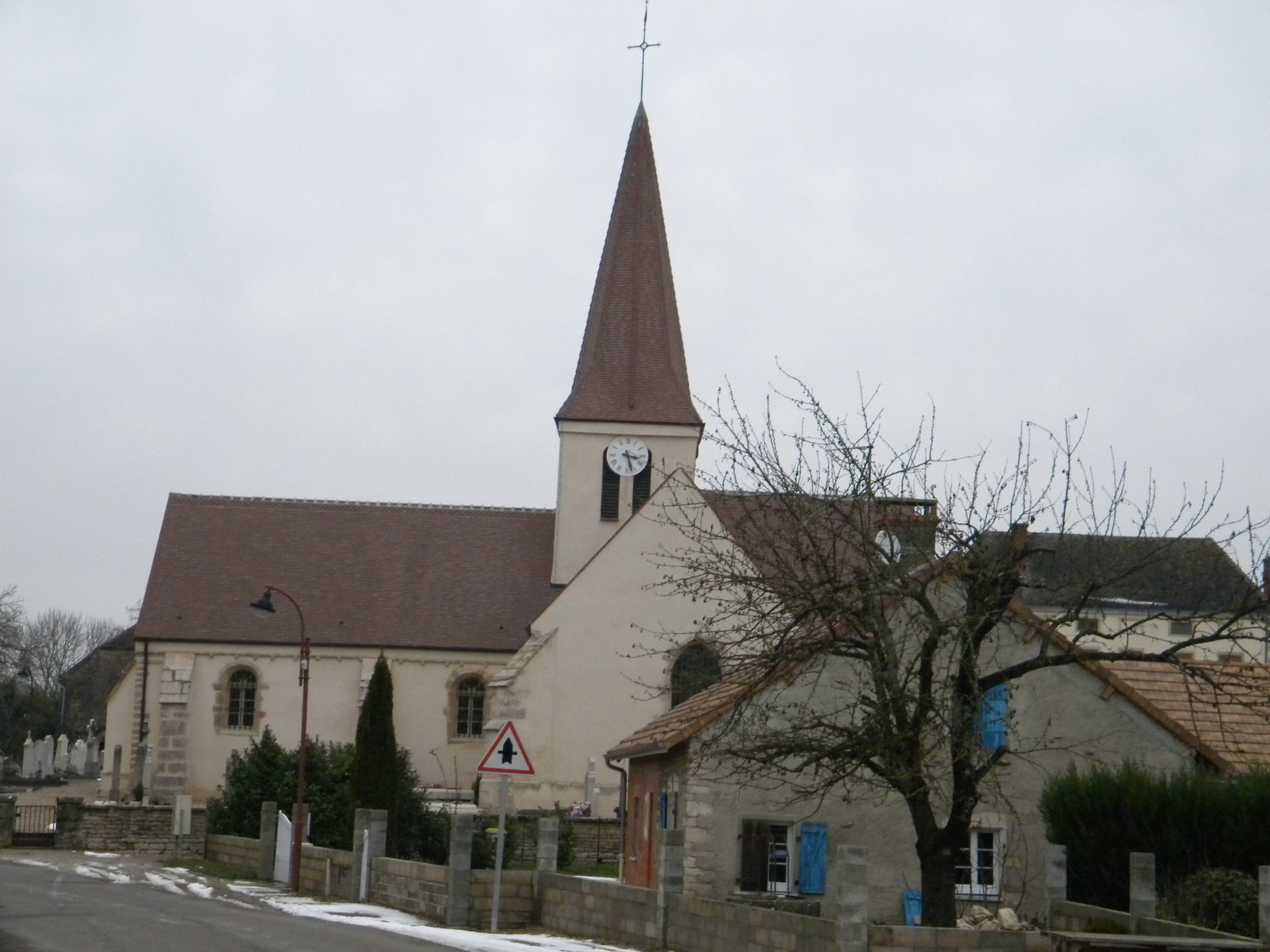
- The church in Corberon

- Coat of arms
- Location of Corberon
- Location within France Location within Bourgogne-Franche-Comté
- Coordinates: 47°00′32″N 4°59′42″E
- Country: France
- Region: Bourgogne-Franche-Comté
- Department: Côte-d'Or
- Arrondissement: Beaune
- Canton: Ladoix-Serrigny
- Intercommunality: CA Beaune Côte et Sud

Government
  - Mayor (2020–2026): Jean-Christophe Vallet
- Area^{1}: 11.72 km^{2} (4.53 sq mi)
- Elevation: 197 m (646 ft)
- Highest elevation: 207 m (679 ft)
- Lowest elevation: 180 m (590 ft)
- Population (2023): 425
  - Density: 36.3/km^{2} (93.9/sq mi)
- Time zone: UTC+01:00 (CET)
  - Summer (DST): UTC+02:00 (CEST)
- INSEE/Postal code: 21189 /21250
- ^{1} French Land Register data, which excludes lakes, ponds, glaciers > 1 km^{2} (0.386 sq mi or 247 acres) and river estuaries.

Corberon (French pronunciation: [kɔʁbəʁɔ̃]) is a commune in the Côte-d'Or department in eastern France.

== Population ==
Historical population
Year	Pop.	±% p.a.
1968	264	—
1975	218	−2.70%
1982	251	+2.03%
1990	283	+1.51%
1999	353	+2.49%
2007	428	+2.44%
2012	439	+0.51%
2017	449	+0.45%
2023	425	−0.91%
Source: INSEE

== See also ==
- Communes of the Côte-d'Or department
