= Robert de Bonnefoy =

French World War I flying ace

- Born: Joseph Denis Bernard Robert de Bonnefoy; 29 October 1894; Saint-Jean-de-Vieux, France
- Died: 27 September 1946 (aged 51)
- Military career
- Allegiance: France
- Branch: Aviation
- Rank: Sous lieutenant
- Units: Escadrille 101, Escadrille 68, Escadrille 65, Escadrille 84, Escadrille 15, Escadrille 31
- Awards: Légion d'honneur, Médaille militaire, Croix de Guerre, Croix de Guerre (Belgium)

Sous Lieutenant Joseph Denis Bernard Robert de Bonnefoy (1894–1946) was a French World War I flying ace credited with six aerial victories.

== Biography ==
De Bonnefoy was a pre-war cavalryman who volunteered for aviation as soon as the war began. His first flying assignment was to Escadrille 101 to pilot a Voisin. He was removed from the front for a spell as an instructor, then successively assigned to two Nieuport squadrons, Escadrilles 68 and 65. He scored his first aerial victory on 2 July 1916, and gradually accumulated five by 5 November 1916. In 1917, he transferred yet again, to Escadrille 84, and closed out his string with his seventh win on 21 August 1917. The much traveled ace would be temporarily withdrawn for a rest, then assigned to Escadrilles 15 and 31 before ending the war in 23.

De Bonnefoy remained in the military after the war. He married Alice Louise Millevoye 6 March 1918 in Lyon. He became an Officer of the Légion d'honneur. He died of hypothermia after swimming in the river Ain.

== Honors and awards ==
Médaille militaire

"A pilot of exceptional ardor and bravery. He has distinguished himself in a number of long distance bombardments, and has given proof of the highest military qualities during the course of recent operations. On 27 July 1916, he downed an enemy plane and forced a second to land in its lines. Having had, on 30 July, his plane riddled by bullets during the course of aerial combat, he nevertheless succeeded, by the grace of his energy and sang-froid, to return his plane to our lines. On 3 August he downed another machine. Already cited three times."

Chevalier de la Légion d'honneur

"Officer of great worth, model of sang-froid, of strength and character, has distinguished himself during the course of his latest offensives by attacking a heavily protected enemy balloon. Médaille militaire for feats of war. Eight citations, two wounds."
