= Constant Plessis =

French World War I flying ace

Constant Emmanuel Plessis
- Born: 11 November 1890; Angers, France
- Died: 1 June 1930 (aged 39)
- Military career
- Allegiance: France
- Branch: Aviation
- Rank: Sous lieutenant
- Units: Escadrille N.88; Escadrille Spa.65
- Awards: Légion d'honneur Médaille militaire Croix de Guerre (French and Belgian)

Sous Lieutenant Constant Emmanuel Plessis was a French World War I flying ace credited with five aerial victories.

== Early life ==
Constant Emmanuel Plessis was born in Angers, France on 11 November 1890.

== Military service ==
=== Pre-aviation service ===
Plessis began his mandated military training as an enlisted soldier on 2 November 1911, and left that active duty on 8 November 1913. With the advent of World War I, he was recalled to active military service on 2 August 1914. On 18 January 1915, he was transferred into the first of two infantry units he would serve in before departing front line duty on 15 May 1915. He returned to the front lines on 15 August 1915, posting unspecified.

On 30 May 1916, Plessis attained the rank of Brigadier. On 15 August 1916, he reported for pilot training.

=== Aviation service ===
Plessis was granted his Pilot's Brevet on 13 December 1916, and was passed on for advanced training. Once trained, he was posted to Escadrille N.88 on 2 March 1917. Promotion to Maréchal-des-logis followed on 25 June.

On 17 August 1917, Plessis made two forays across the German lines, downing a German aircraft each time. On 27 September, he was awarded the Médaille militaire for the day's actions:

"Non-commissioned officer of great bravery and deliberate audacity. On 17 August 1917, by crossing the German lines to attack successively two groups of enemy planes, he downed his adversary each time. One citation."

On 1 January 1918, Plessis was promoted to Adjutant, and on the 26th temporarily commissioned as a Sous lieutenant. Beginning on 30 May 1918, he would score four more aerial victories, and be awarded the Legion d'honneur, as follows:

An article in the website The Aerodrome notes him as a "Remarkable pilot. Elite officer. For more than two years in aviation he has become a superb example of bravery and absolute disdain for danger in any shape or form. Has flown 500 hours against the enemy and has had more than 100 combats, during the course of which he has downed one balloon and five German planes. He particularly distinguished himself in the course of his last operations by strafing enemy emplacements from low altitude, and making long distant reconnaissances which allowed him to provide the commandant with valuable information. One wound. Médaille Militaire for feats of war. Four citations."

== Postwar career ==
Constant Plessis was again mustered into the reserves, on 13 August 1919. On 4 May 1920, he was promoted to Lieutenant.

On 1 June 1930, Constant Emmanuel Plessis died in an aviation accident while aboard a Caudron C.60.

== Decorations and awards ==
- Chevalier de la Legion d'Honneur: 28 October 1918
- Médaille Militaire: 27 September 1917
- French Croix de Guerre with six palmes.
- Belgian Croix de guerre

== Bibliography ==
- Franks, Norman and Frank Bailey (2008). OVER THE FRONT: The Complete Record of the Fighter Aces and Units of the United States and French Air Services, 1914-1918 . Grub Street Publishing. ISBN 0948817542 ISBN 978-0948817540
