= Gilbert Uteau =

French flying ace

Gilbert Jean Uteau
- Born: 4 June 1897
- Died: 5 April 1963 (aged 65); Bordeaux, France
- Military career
- Allegiance: France
- Branch: Aviation
- Rank: Maréchal-des-logis
- Unit: Escadrille Spa.315
- Awards: Médaille militaire Croix de Guerre

Maréchal-des-logis Gilbert Jean Uteau was a French World War I flying ace credited with five aerial victories.

== Biography ==
See also Aerial victory standards of World War I

Gilbert Jean Uteau volunteered for military service as an artilleryman about a year after World War I began, on 10 July 1915. The next notice of Uteau in the archives is his posting to Escadrille Spa.315 on 24 November 1917. Flying in defense of Belfort, he shot down two German airplanes and two observation balloons between 11 July and 21 October 1918. On 14 September, after his fourth triumph, Uteau was awarded theMedaille Militaire for valor. By the war's end on 11 November 1918, he had also earned the Croix de Guerre with six palmes and an etoile.

Postwar, he was taken into the Legion d'honneur. He became a journalist, writing under the pseudonym of Le Bailli. He died in Bordeaux on 5 April 1963.
