= Germaine Arbeau-Bonnefoy =

Germaine Étiennette Arbeau-Bonnefoy (26 June 1893 in Paris – 7 January 1986 id.) was a French teacher of piano who founded the Évolution Musicale de la Jeunesse (EMJ) in July 1939, a Parisian association of concerts-educational conferences better known as Musigrains and having actually operated between February 1941 and May 1986. She herself presented most of the concerts until 1977, seconded or replaced as from 1964 by Rémy Stricker, Jean-Pierre Armengaud and Michel Capelier.

Hosted in the first and last years in the old Salle du Conservatoire, the Pleyel and Gaveau venues, the Maison de la Mutualité and the Théâtre du Châtelet, the Musigrains were mostly associated to the Théâtre des Champs-Élysées from 1949 to 1978. Focused on classical music, the concerts made incursions into the fields of contemporary music, classical or modern dance, folklore and jazz.

Germaine Arbeau-Bonnefoy was married to Pierre Arbeau-Barreau (Paris, 1897–Paris, 1979), a pianist and composer. They were close friends of Édouard Autant and Louise Lara, as well as Geneviève Joy and Henri Dutilleux.

== Bibliography ==
- Laurent Herz, Les Musigrains, une institution pédagogique et musicale (1939-1986), at Éditions L'Harmattan, Paris, 2013. ISBN 978-2-343-02020-4
