= Jean-François Jannekeyn =

French fencer

Jean François Jannekeyn
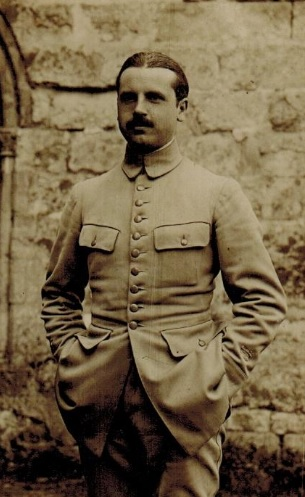
- Born: 16 November 1892
- Died: 17 November 1971 (aged 79)
- Military career
- Allegiance: France; Vichy France
- Branch: French Air Force
- Rank: Major General
- Unit: Escadrille BR.132
- Conflicts: World War I World War II
- Awards: Legion d'Honneur; Croix de Guerre
- Other work: Minister of Air of Vichy France

Jean-François Jannekeyn (16 November 1892 – 17 November 1971) was a French military aviator, general, politician and Olympic fencer.

A World War I flying ace credited with five aerial victories as a bomber pilot, he flew a Breguet 14. As a professional officer, he remained in the French Air Force after World War I and he also competed at the 1924 Summer Olympics as a sabre fencer. During World War II, he held the rank of general and served as Minister of Air in Vichy France from 1942 to 1943.

== Biography ==
Jean François Jannekeyn was born in Cambrai, France, on 16 November 1892.

Jannekyn served as a cavalryman before his transfer to aviation service during World War I. Transferring in 1917, he served as an aerial observer. On 23 May 1918, he took command of Escadrille BR.132, a bomber squadron. He usually flew with Lieutenant Eugène Weismann as his pilot. Jannekyn gained his first aerial victory on 22 August 1918. Then, on 14 September 1918, Jannekyn and Weismann were one of four Bréguet air crews battling German Fokker D.VIIs. Four Fokkers were shot down, and all French participants were credited with four aerial victories.

In 1939, at the start of World War II, he was a Brigadier general; the following year, he was bumped to Major general. In 1942 and 1943, he served as Minister of Air.

== Awards and honors ==
Chevalier de la Légion d'Honneur
"An officer of exceptional merit who has never ceased throughout the war, at first as a volunteer in a cavalry battalion, then in day bombardment aviation, to be an example of courage and self-denial. Five citations." Chevalier de la Légion d'Honneur citation, 27 March 1919

He also won the Croix de Guerre with two palmes, an etoile de vermeil, an etoile de argent and an etoile de bronze.

== See also ==
- Aerial victory standards of World War I
