= Eugène Weismann =

French flying ace (1896–1973)

- Born: 18 March 1896; Paris
- Died: 20 July 1973 (aged 77); Paris
- Military career
- Allegiance: France
- Branch: Infantry; aviation
- Service years: 1914–1918
- Rank: Lieutenant
- Units: 28c Regiment d'Infanterie; Escadrille 132
- Awards: Légion d'honneur Médaille militaire Croix de Guerre

Lieutenant Eugène Weismann (18 March 1896 – 20 July 1973) joined the infantry on 28 September 1914 and suffered frostbite and three wounds before transferring to aerial service in 1917. The loss of a foot to a grenade did not prevent him from becoming an aerial gunner and a flying ace with seven confirmed aerial victories. Weismann was one of five notable Jewish aces. He also received citations in World War II.

== Biography ==
See also Aerial victory standards of World War I

Eugène Weismann was born in Paris on 18 March 1896.

On 28 September 1914, he volunteered for the military, being accepted as an infantryman. In November, he suffered shrapnel wounds; in December, his feet froze. In May 1915, shrapnel once again found the body of Eugène Weismann. Promoted to Sergeant in October 1915, he was considered for officerhood. He became an Aspirant for officer's rank on 1 May 1916. Nine days later, he rejoined his regiment, only to have a foot blown away on 1 June. Despite the amputation, he returned to regimental duty on 23 May 1917, only to transfer to aviation duty. He was subsequently brevetted as an aerial observer on 17 July 1917.

On 19 April 1918, he was raised from Aspirant to Sous lieutenant. That same day, he was posted to a Brequet bomber squadron, Escadrille BR.132. At some point, Weismann learned to fly, as his commanding officer in Escadrille BR.132, Jean-François Jannekeyn, often flew with him as the observer.

On 22 June 1918, Weismann shot down two German airplanes; he downed another on 22 August. Then, on 14 September 1918, with Jannekyn manning the observer's guns, the duo found themselves one of four Breguet bombers fending off German Fokker D.VII fighters. Four Fokkers fell to the bomber formation. In French fashion, all their participants were credited with four victories each, although the squadron's victory count only went up by four. Weismann was now a flying ace; Jannekyn also became an ace, with five victories total.

By the time the war ended on 11 November 1918, Weismann had flown 131 combat sorties, carried out 40 bombing raids, and been in 20 aerial combats. He had been awarded the Medaille Militaire, and the Croix de Guerre with seven palmes and an etoile d'argent. On 22 June 1919, he was rewarded with membership in the Legion d'honneur.

Weisman would serve again in World War II, earning a number of decorations, both French and American. He would die in his native Paris on 20 July 1973.
