= Omer Demeuldre =

French WWI pilot

Omer Paul Demeuldre
- Born: 8 March 1892; Cambrai, France
- Died: 3 May 1918 (aged 26)
- Military career
- Allegiance: France
- Branch: Aviation
- Service years: 1912–1918
- Rank: Sous lieutenant
- Units: Escadrille 63, Escadrille 84
- Awards: Légion d'honneur, Médaille militaire, Croix de Guerre, Mentioned in Dispatches four times

Sous lieutenant Omer Paul Demeuldre (8 March 1892—3 May 1918) Légion d'honneur, Médaille militaire, Croix de Guerre, Mentioned in Dispatches was a World War I French flying ace credited with 13 aerial victories.

== Early life ==
Omer Paul Demeuldre was born on 8 March 1892 in Cambrai, France.

== World War I ==
Demeuldre joined the French military in 1912. At the start of World War I, he was an aviation mechanic. He became an observer with Escadrille MF63, and on 7 September 1915, working the guns on a Maurice Farman, he scored his first victory. After two Mentions in Despatches, he was sent to pilot's training. He received Pilot's Brevet No. 4403 on 2 October 1916. Upon his return to his old unit as a pilot, he achieved his second win on 23 May 1917. In October 1917, he was reassigned to fly a Spad fighter with Escadrille 84. On the 30th of the month, he tallied his third triumph, which won him the Médaille militaire. Demeuldre racked three more wins in December, ending the year an ace with six victories.

Demeuldre began 1918 with a victory on 3 January. He was commissioned as Sous Lieutenant on the 25th. On 3 February, he scored twice; he scored three times more in March. His final victory came on 14 April 1918, when he sent a German two-seater reconnaissance craft crashing down over Éplessier.

== Death in action ==
On 3 May 1918, Omer Paul Demeuldre lost his final fight while shooting it out with a German two-seater. He was posthumously awarded the Légion d'honneur to add to the Médaille militaire and Croix de Guerre with seven palmes and two etoiles.

== Honors and awards ==
Text of award of Médaille militaire

Excellent noncommissioned officer. After having distinguished himself in reconnaissance and artillery spotting, he made a brilliant debut in pursuit aviation where he showed himself to be an audacious and capable pilot. On 30 October 1917, he downed his third plane which crashed in flames in the German lines. Four citations.

Text of award of Chevalier de la Légion d'honneur

"An exceptional pursuit pilot whose high morals, initiative, and bravery excite the admiration and emulation of his comrades in combat. He has downed thirteen enemy planes, ten of them in four months. On 3 May 1918, he fell in an all out battle during an attack at close quarters with an enemy two-seater, leaving behind the highest example of gallantry and young ardor."
