= Del Vial =

Del Antoine Gaston Vial
- Born: 27 December 1891; Le Val-d'Ajol, France
- Died: Unknown
- Military career
- Allegiance: France
- Branch: Artillery; aviation
- Service years: 1912–1918
- Rank: Sous lieutenant
- Units: Escadrille BL.49; Escadrille 3 Escadrille MF.29; Escadrille F.123; Escadrille Sop.39; Escadrille Spa.315; Escadrille Spa.152
- Awards: Légion d'honneur Médaille militaire Croix de Guerre

Sous lieutenant Del Antoine Gaston Vial (born 27 December 1891, date of death unknown) served in an artillery regiment from 1912 to 1913, when he transferred to aviation. He became a flying ace during World War I by scoring eight aerial victories. Another notable achievement of his was his frequent participation in long range bombardment missions.

== Biography ==
See also Aerial victory standards of World War I

Del Antoine Gaston Vial was born in Le Val-d'Ajol, France on 27 December 1891.

In 1912, he began his mandatory military service, serving as an artilleryman. The following year, he transferred to aviation. When World War I began, Vial was serving in Escadrille BL.49. On 25 March 1915, he was posted to Escadrille MS.3. On 10 June, he was sent to pilot's training, graduating with his Military Pilot's Brevet on 22 July 1915.

His first active flying assignment was as a bomber pilot for Escadrille MF.29. Promoted to Sergeant on 21 September 1915, he was wounded in the right arm ten days later. He was Mentioned in dispatches twice before being awarded the Médaille militaire:

Médaille Militaire
A very adroit and courageous pilot, who has taken part in twenty long distance bombardments. Attacked by two enemy planes on 22 July 1916, he downed one of them. Already cited twice in orders. Médaille Militaire citation, 31 July 1916

After another Mention in Dispatches, Vial was transferred to Escadrille F.123 as a Farman pilot on 24 January 1917. A further transfer, on 1 March, took him to Escadrille Sop.39. On 23 August 1917, he once again moved, this time to fly a SPAD fighter for Escadrille Spa.315. He would score his second, third, and fourth aerial victories with them before being shifted to Escadrille Spa.152 on 12 June 1918. His previous temporary promotion to Sous lieutenant was confirmed soon after, on 24 June 1918.

On both 8 July and 20 July, Vial shot down a pair of German planes, sending his total victories to eight. He was subsequently bequeathed the Legion d'honneur:

Chevalier de la Légion d'Honneur
An officer of exceptional bravery and stamina. Took part in a great many long distance bombardments both by day and night. Transferred to pursuit aviation, he has not ceased to demonstrate his qualities of audacity and sang-froid. He recently attacked, at the head of his patrol, three enemy two-seaters and with his pilots downed two, reporting therewith his 7th and 8th victories. One wound, six citations. Chevalier de la Légion d'Honneur citation, 24 August 1918

Besides his Légion d'Honneur and Médaille Militaire, Del Antoine Gaston Vial won the Croix de guerre with eight palms.
