= Eugène Camplan =

Eugene Jules Emile Camplan
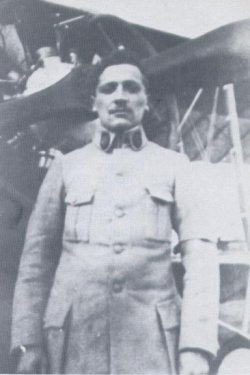
- Born: 10 October 1889; Nîmes, France
- Died: 18 January 1944 (aged 54); Les Adjots, Nazi-occupied France
- Military career
- Allegiance: France
- Branch: Infantry; aviation
- Service years: 1914-1918, 1939-1940
- Rank: Captain
- Unit: Escadrille No. 65
- Conflicts: World War I World War II
- Awards: Légion d'honneur, Médaille militaire, Croix de Guerre

Sous-lieutenant Eugène Jules Emile Camplan (10 October 1889 – 18 January 1944) was a French World War I flying ace credited with seven aerial victories.

== Biography ==
Camplan was born on 10 October 1889 in the city of Nîmes, France to a wealthy family. His father worked as a merchant in the town of Montpellier. Camplan moved to Gironde as an adult and began medical studies. When World War I broke out, he was mobilized as a soldier in the 18e section d'infirmiers militaires, serving in Lorraine, on the Marne, and on the Aisne. He asked to move into a combat unit, a request that was granted on 25 April 1915, allowing him to become an infantryman in the 59e régiment d’infanterie. During his time with the 59th Regiment, Camplan fought in Champagne. On 17 May 1915, a shell exploded near his trench, burying him alive and causing him injury. He was evacuated from the trench and transferred back to a nursing unit in Flanders after his recovery. He was wounded again on 24 August 1915, causing him to be deemed unfit for armed service for 11 months, until 2 August 1916, when he was accepted into the French Air Service. During his service in the air force, he scored seven confirmed aerial victories, with his final victory being on 1 August 1918, during an aerial combat with eight enemy aircraft. After being demobilized in early 1919, Camplan dedicated his life to aviation, joining the CFRNA as a pilot in 1920. He left the company in 1924 to open a school in Bordeaux. He sold the school in 1926, becoming a test pilot at the Société des Avions Bernard, setting records for a number of their planes. He was mobilized at the beginning of World War II as a reserve capitaine. He was demobilized after the Armistice of 22 June 1940 and became involved in the French Resistance. He was assassinated on 18 January 1944 in Les Adjots during a resistance meeting.

== Honors and awards ==
Chevalier de la Légion d'Honneur citation:
"Elite officer. Having been wounded twice in the infantry and rendered unfit for this service, he was trained as a pursuit pilot at his request, where for two years he has gained the admirations of all by his integrity, bravery and his absolute disdain of danger. He downed seven enemy planes and made numerous voluntary reconnaissances of long durations. Severely wounded while attacking eight enemy planes alone, he recovered and returned to his unit. Médaille Militaire for feats of war. Six citations."

Médaille Militaire citation:
"Pursuit pilot of bravery and indescribable spirit of devotion. Constantly giving proof of the highest military qualities. He particularly distinguished himself during the course of the latest operations by strafing enemy troops at a very low altitude, by attacking balloons, several times, and making long distance solo reconnaissances under particularly perilous conditions. He recently downed his fourth enemy plane. Two wounds. Three citations."

Camplan also was awarded the Croix de Guerre with seven palmes.
