= Paul Sauvage (aviator) =

French flying ace

- Born: Paul Joannes Sauvage; 5 February 1897; Villefranche-sur-Saône
- Died: 7 January 1917 (aged 19); East of Maisonnette, France
- Military career
- Allegiance: France
- Branch: Aviation
- Rank: Sergeant
- Units: Escadrille 65, Escadrille 38
- Awards: Médaille militaire, Croix de Guerre

Sergent Paul Joannes Sauvage (5 February 1897—7 January 1917) was a French World War I flying ace credited with 8 confirmed and 6 probable aerial victories. He was originally posted to fly a Nieuport for Escadrille N 65, and scored his first victory with them on 16 July 1916. He became the youngest French ace on 2 October at age 19 years and 239 days, and held that distinction until his death by anti-aircraft fire on 7 January 1917.

12 days later Pierre Marinovitch scored his 5th victory and became the youngest French ace until the end of the war, at the point of his 5th victory was Marinovith even younger than Savage on 2 October by exactly 70 days (19 years and 169 days).

== Early life ==
Paul Joannes Sauvage was born in Villefranche-sur-Saône, France on 5 February 1897.

== World War I military service ==
On 29 March 1916, Sauvage received Pilot's Brevet No. 3234. Once trained as a pilot, he ended up in Escadrille 65. By the time he claimed his first approved victory in July, he was ranked as a Caporal. On 2 September 1916, after scoring his first three victories, Sauvage was one of the first pilots issued a new Spad VII. By the time he shot down his fourth German opponent on 23 September 1916, he had been promoted to Sergent. His fifth aerial victory, on 2 October 1916, made him the youngest ace in French aviation. His sixth victory, on 3 November 1916, would soon be followed by award of the Médaille militaire on the 18th.

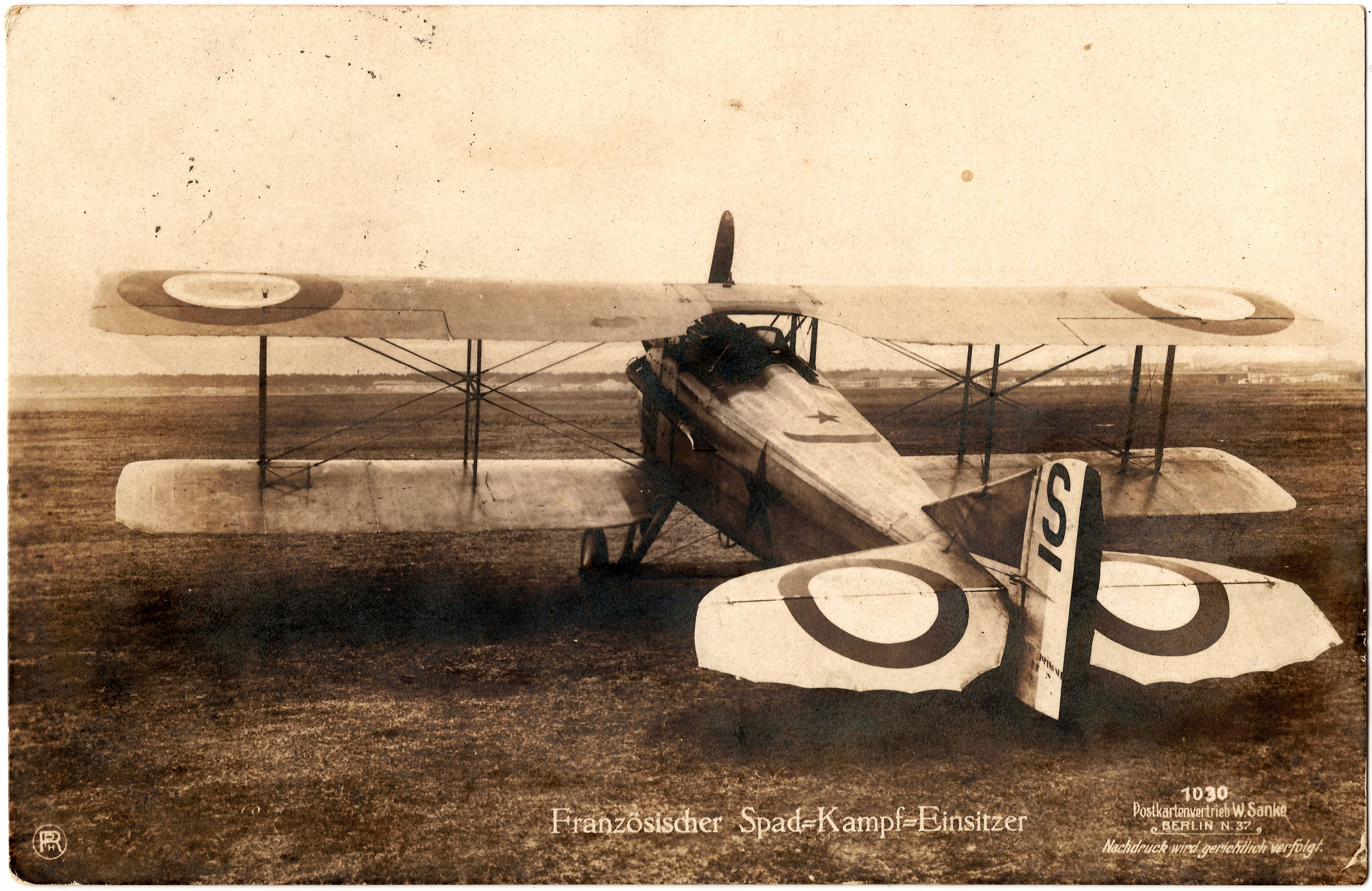
A German postcard of a French Spad VII

Sauvage then flew a while with Escadrille 38, scoring two more confirmed victories during December 1916. However, he returned to Escadrille 65 at some date between 28 December 1916 and 8 January 1917. The French casualty list of the latter date lists Paul Joannes Sauvage; at 1520 hours 7 January 1917, his Spad and an antiaircraft shell intersected somewhere east of Maisonette, France. Sauvage died instantly.

== Honors and awards ==
The Médaille militaire (Awarded 18 November 1916)
"Sergent pilot of Escadrille N65. Young pursuit pilot who has rapidly been classed among the best, thanks to his strength and highly remarkable sense of duty. On 3 November 1916 he downed his sixth German plane which crashed in flames behind enemy lines. Has been cited three times in army orders."

The Croix de Guerre with five palmes
