= Marcel Henriot =

French flying ace

Marcel Laurent Jean-Baptiste Henriot
- Born: 3 September 1896; Saulnot, France
- Died: 19 November 1952 (aged 56); Nantes, France
- Military career
- Allegiance: France
- Branch: Aviation
- Rank: Adjutant
- Unit: Escadrille 65
- Conflicts: World War I
- Awards: Médaille militaire Croix de Guerre

Adjutant Marcel Laurent Henriot (English: /ɒ̃ˈriːoʊ/ ahn-REE-oh, French: [maʁsɛl lɔʁɑ̃ ɑ̃ʁjo]; 3 September 1896 – 19 November 1952) was a French World War I flying ace credited with six confirmed aerial victories.

== Biography ==
Marcel Laurent Henriot was born in Saulnot, France on 3 September 1896.

He began a four year military enlistment on 2 January 1915, being assigned to artillery. On 29 June 1916, he transferred to aviation to learn to fly. He graduated training on 1 December 1916, receiving Military Pilot's Brevet No. 4998. After advanced training, he was posted to Escadrille 65 on 19 March 1917. On 24 April 1917, he shot a German scout for his first aerial victory. He scored a couple more victories in late 1917. On 1 January 1918, having previously been promoted through lower enlisted ranks, he was promoted to Adjutant.

He would shoot down three more German aircraft during the latter part of 1918, with the last victory being on 28 September 1918. Henriot would end the war having been awarded the Médaille militaire, and the Croix de Guerre with five palms.

Marcel Laurent Henriot died in Nantes, France on 19 November 1952.
