= André Robert Lévy =

French flying ace

- Born: 6 June 1893; Paris, France
- Died: 12 March 1973 (aged 79)
- Military career
- Allegiance: France
- Branch: Infantry; aviation
- Rank: Sergent
- Units: Escadrille 29, Escadrille 561
- Awards: French: Légion d'honneur, Médaille militaire, Croix de Guerre, Italian: Croce di Guerra, 2 Gold and 2 Bronze Medal for Military Valor

Sergent André Robert Lévy was a French World War I flying ace credited with six aerial victories.

== Early life ==
André Robert Lévy was born in Paris, France, on 6 June 1893. He was mobilized for infantry duty at the start of World War I, on 2 September 1914.

== Military service ==
André Robert Lévy transferred to aviation on 8 October 1916. He qualified as a pilot on 4 March 1917. He was initially assigned to fly a Farman for Escadrille 29. However, he flew a Sopwith Aviation Company Sopwi 1.A2 for his first victory on 7 April 1917. On 16 May, he was then reassigned, to the only French air squadron on the Italian Front, Escadrille 561, which was tasked with air defense of Venice. Using a mixture of Nieuport and Spad fighters emblazoned with a dogs-head insignia, Lévy scored his second win on 21 June 1918, scored a double on 20 July, and became an ace on 5 August. On 16 September, he became a balloon buster, destroying an Austro-Hungarian observation balloon and being shot down in the process. With the engine dead from a fuel line severed by anti-aircraft fire, Lévy purposely landed hard, bending the landing gear, and inverting his Spad XIII. He was then taken away to prison camp in Mulbach. On his second attempt at escape, on 2 November, Lévy escaped through a mountainous wilderness smothered under 30 inches of snow. He made it back to his unit on 6 November 1918.

== Later life ==
André Robert Lévy was released from military duty on 3 September 1919, with the rank of Sergeant. He died upon 12 March 1973.
