= Lucien Cayol =

French flying ace (1893–1960)

Lucien Eugene Cayol
- Born: 27 November 1893; Marseille, France
- Died: 22 October 1960 (aged 66); Paris, France
- Military career
- Allegiance: France
- Branch: Flying service
- Rank: Lieutenant
- Units: Spa 65, Spa 84
- Conflicts: World War I
- Awards: Legion d'Honneur, Croix de Guerre

Lieutenant Lucien Eugene Cayol (1893-1960) was a French World War I fighter ace credited with five aerial victories. He was wounded three times within eight months in defense of his country.

== Biography ==
Cayol was born in Bouches du Rhone, France on 27 November 1893. Enlisting in the French army for three years on 16 May 1913, he was a sergeant when World War I broke out. Serving in the ranks, he was wounded on 26 September 1914, 12 May 1915, and 25 May 1915. He received a brevet commission on 17 April 1916. On 10 May 1917, he was awarded the Legion d'Honneur. A week later, he was promoted to lieutenant. On 11 October 1917, he began pilot's training; he received his Military Pilot's Brevet on 26 November. Posted to Escadrille 65 on 13 May 1918, he won two victories flying with them. He was then transferred to Escadrille 65 on 10 September 1918, with whom he scored three more victories.

Cayol won the Croix de Guerre in addition to the Legion d'Honneur. He died in Paris on 22 October 1960.
