= André Julien Chainat =

French World War I flying ace

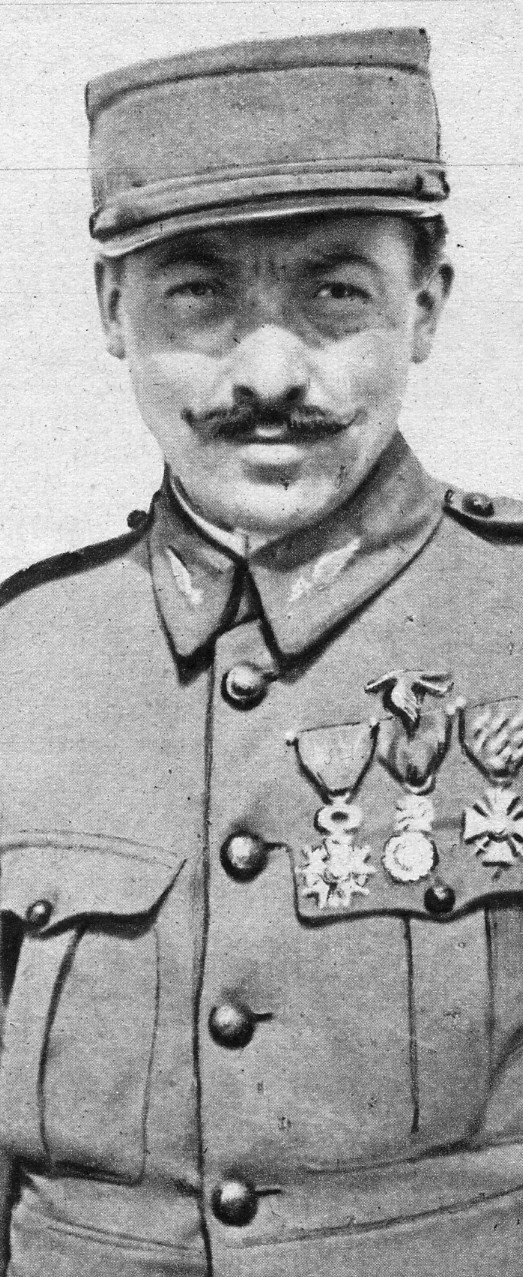
- Born: 27 June 1892; La Chapelle-Saint-Laurian, France
- Died: 6 November 1961 (aged 69); Cannes, France
- Military career
- Allegiance: France
- Branch: Artillery; aviation
- Rank: Adjutant
- Units: 6eme Regiment d'Artillerie, Escadrille 4, Escadrille 23, Escadrille 38, Escadrille No. 3
- Awards: Légion d'honneur, Médaille militaire, Croix de Guerre with nine Palmes and one étoile de bronze, Mentioned in Dispatches four times

Adjutant André Julien Chainat was a French World War I flying ace credited with eleven aerial victories.

== Early life ==
André Julien Chainat was born in La Chapelle-Saint-Laurian, France, on 27 June 1892. Chainat joined the French military on 25 October 1913 and was trained as an artilleryman. On 22 April 1914, he transferred to the 2eme Groupe d'Aviation and was posted to Escadrille B4, (the 'B' denoting the unit's use of Bleriots), on 20 July 1914, just in time for the beginning of the war.

== Aerial service ==
He was subsequently selected for pilot's training, and received Pilot's Brevet No. 1165 on 8 June 1915. Nine days later, he was promoted to corporal. Twelve days after that, he was assigned to Escadrille 23; he was later transferred on to Escadrille 38 on 1 November 1915. He was injured twice in accidents with this squadron.

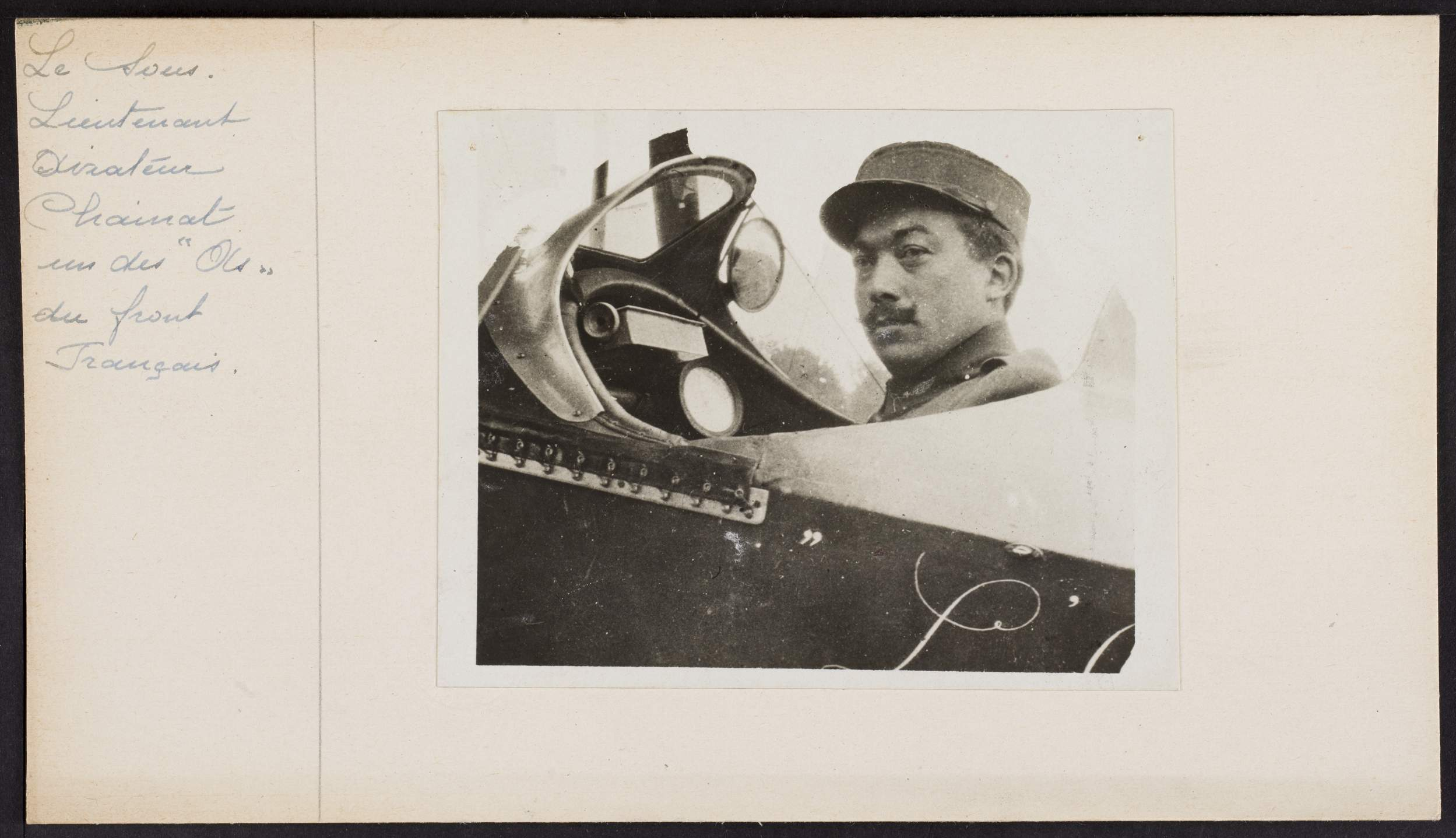
Sous-lieutenant Chainat in his Nieuport 17. He named his aircraft "Blue Bird".

On 17 January 1916, he was transferred to Escadrille 3. Four days later, he was promoted to Sergeant. He began using a Nieuport fighter; he added the motto L'Oiseau Bleu (Blue Bird) to the squadron markings on its fuselage. He used this motto, followed by a number, on each of his successive aircraft; his final SPAD VII was Blue Bird 6.

From March to September 1916, he continued to score victories, including sharing victims with Georges Guynemer and Alfred Heurtaux. Chainat was wounded once during this victory string, on 19 June, which he overcame; his second wounding, on 7 September 1916, removed him from combat. On 10 October, he was promoted to Adjutant.

On 1 January 1917, Chainat transferred to the 3eme Croupe d'Aviation.

== Postwar ==
Andre Julien Chainat died in Cannes on 6 November 1961.

== Honors and awards ==
Chevalier de la Légion d'honneur

"First class pursuit pilot. Has downed six enemy planes between 26 March and 12 July 1916. He was wounded on 16 June. Already cited four times in orders and received the Médaille militaire." (Chevalier de la Légion d'honneur citation, 3 August 1916)

Médaille militaire

"Pilot of great skill and bravery. On 26 March 1916, he attacked and downed a plane which fell in flames in front of our lines." (Médaille militaire citation, 5 April 1916).

Croix de guerre with nine palmes

Etoile de bronze, Mentioned in Dispatches four times

== Sources of information ==
Preceded by Albert Louis Deullin	Top Flying Ace; France, World War I	Succeeded by Noël de Rochefort
