= Jules Covin =

Jules Charles Covin
- Born: 18 October 1895; Saint-Saulve, France
- Died: 21 March 1918 (aged 22)
- Military career
- Allegiance: France
- Branch: Aviation
- Rank: Sous lieutenant
- Unit: C9, MF52, R213, N31
- Awards: Médaille militaire, Croix de Guerre

Sous Lieutenant Jules Charles Covin (18 October 1895 – 21 March 1918) was a French World War I flying ace credited with six aerial victories.

== Biography ==
Jules Charles Covin was born in Saint-Saulve, France on 18 October 1895. He began his military service on 2 December 1914, being posted to the 3eme Group d'Aviation. His success in pilot's training was rewarded by Military Pilot's Brevet No. on 30 January 1915. His second flying assignment, on 28 August 1916, was to Escadrille 52, with whom he scored his first aerial victory, on 10 November 1916. Two weeks later, Covin was awarded the Médaille militaire.

Serving with two subsequent squadrons, Covin would shoot down five more enemy airplanes between 26 January 1917 and 3 February 1918. He was wounded in action on 21 March 1918, and died of his injuries.
