= Albert Chabrier =

Albert Rene Chabrier
- Born: May 24, 1896; Briare, France
- Died: January 18, 1920 (aged 23); Peru
- Military career
- Allegiance: France
- Branch: Aviation
- Rank: Lieutenant
- Unit: N315
- Awards: Croix de Guerre

Lieutenant Albert Rene Chabrier (1896-1920) was a French World War I flying ace credited with six aerial victories.

== Biography ==
Albert René Chabrier was born on 24 May 1896 in Briare, France. His earlier service during World War I is unclear; however, he was posted to Escadrille 315 on 9 November 1917. He was credited with six aerial victories during 1918. He was awarded the Croix de Guerre with four palmes during his service.

Chabrier was killed in an aviation accident on 18 January 1920, in Peru.
