= Giovanni Nicelli =

Italian flying ace (1893–1918)

- Born: 27 October 1893; Lugagnano Val d'Arda, Kingdom of Italy
- Died: 5 May 1918 (aged 24); Montello, Kingdom of Italy
- Military career
- Branch: Corpo Aeronautico Militare
- Rank: Sergente
- Unit: 79a Squadriglia
- Conflicts: World War I; Battle of Caporetto
- Awards: Three Silver awards of the Medal for Military Valor; French Croix de Guerre

Sergeant Giovanni Nicelli (27 October 1893 – 5 May 1918) was an Italian World War I flying ace. He was credited with eight or nine confirmed aerial victories (sources vary), and died in service to his nation on 5 May 1918.

== Early life ==
Nicelli was born on 27 October 1893 in Lugagnano Val d'Arda, Province of Piacenza, the Kingdom of Italy.

== World War I ==
First records available of Nicelli show him as a Caporale, piloting a Nieuport 17 for 79a Squadriglia in April 1917. His first aerial victory claim was reported for 14 June 1917. He would post 11 more claims before his death.

As 79a Squadriglia was drawn into the Battle of Caporetto towards the end of 1917, Nicelli forced down two Austro-Hungarian airplanes and won his first Silver award of the Medal for Military Valor. On 30 January 1918, he claimed his sixth victory and was once again awarded the Silver Medal for Military Valor. He continued his successes until 4 May, when he tackled seven enemy aircraft singlehandedly, and was credited with downing one of them. He was also credited with a second victory that day, in a separate action. On 5 May, Giovanni Nicelli's Nieuport 27 broke up while in flight, killing him.

== List of aerial victories ==
Confirmed victories are numbered and listed chronologically. Unconfirmed victories are denoted by "u/c" and may or may not be listed by date.

No.	Date/time	Aircraft	Foe	Result	Location	Notes
u/c	14 June 1917	Nieuport 17	Enemy aircraft		Mount Verena	Victory originally confirmed, but disallowed postwar
1	25 October 1917 @ 0800 hours		Enemy aircraft	Forced to land	Marcesina	
2	7 November 1917 circa 1615 hours		Enemy aircraft	Forced to land	Fonsazo	Awarded Silver Medal for Military Valor
3	7 December 1917 @ 1130 hours		Enemy aircraft		Val d'Assa	
4	13 December 1917 ca. 1130 hours		Enemy aircraft		Asiago	
5	30 January 1918 @ 1000 hours		Enemy two-seater		Col d'Eshele, Asiago	Awarded Silver Medal for Military Valor
u/c	4 February 1918 ca. 1100 hours		Black enemy fighter craft		Valstagna	Claim shared with Antonio Reali
6	5 February 1918 ca. 0830 hours		Enemy two-seater	Forced to land	Case Girardi	Shared with Marziale Cerutti
7	13 February 1918 @ 0915 hours		Enemy fighter		Marcesina	
u/c	24 February 1918		Enemy aircraft		Mount Grappa	
8	4 May 1918 @ 0850 hours	Nieuport 27	Enemy aircraft		Montello	Austro-Hungarians reported no matching loss
9	4 May 1918 @ 1025 hours	Nieuport 27	Enemy fighter		Montello	Austro-Hungarians reported no matching loss

The victory claims of Italian aces were scrutinized postwar by a commission from Italy's Military Intelligence branch. They disallowed Nicelli's first victory, crediting him with eight confirmed victories. Aviation historians credit him with nine.
