= 79a Squadriglia =

- Active: Founded November 1916
- Country: Kingdom of Italy
- Branch: Corpo Aeronautico Militare
- Type: Fighter squadron
- Engagements: World War I

Aircraft flown
- Fighter: Nieuport 11; Nieuport 17; Nieuport 27; Hanriot HD.1

79a Squadriglia was one of Italy's first fighter squadrons. It served in combat during World War I from 13 January 1917 though war's end. It was credited with 47 aerial victories.

== History ==
79a Squadriglia of the Corpo Aeronautico Militare was one of Italy's original fighter squadrons. It was founded in November 1916 at the Central Flying School in Arcade, Italy. On 13 January 1917, it was deployed to Istrana, with its area of operations being the Asiago Plateau near the ongoing Battles of the Isonzo. The new unit flew its first combat mission on 20 January 1917.

On 28 March 1917, 3a Sezione was detached for city defense duties. On 10 April 1917, the squadron was attached to 10o Gruppo. A month later, it was transferred to 7o Gruppo. On 2 June 1917, Antonio Reali scored his first aerial victory for the squadron's initial success.

On 3 December 1917, the squadron was posted to the 15o Gruppo. In June 1918, it was assigned to the Massia da Caccia (Fighter Mass) before passing to control of the 23o Gruppo. The squadron served through war's end. Its wartime record was 4,411 combat sorties flown, with 47 victories achieved in 227 aerial combats. The squadron had suffered five killed.

== Commanding officers ==
- Capitano Francesco Chimirri: November 1916 until injured in takeoff accident on 15 June 1917
- Tenente (later Capitano) Cesare Bartoletti
- Tenente (later Capitano) Umberto Mazzini: 3 December 1917 - 3 September 1918
- Tenente Eugenio Mossi (temporary): 3 September 1918 - 3 October 1918
- Capitano Arturo Freddi Cavallotti: 3 October 1918 to war's end

== Duty stations ==
- Arcade, Italy: November 1916
- Istrana: 20 January 1917
- Nove di Bassano: 2 November 1917
- San Lucia: March 1918

== Notable members ==
- Marziale Cerutti
- Antonio Reali
- Giovanni Nicelli
- Attilio Imolesi

== Aircraft ==
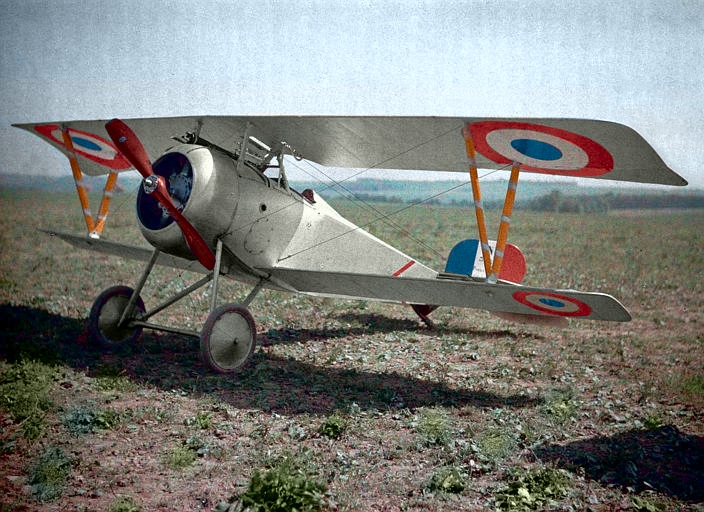
Nieuport 17

Squadron insignia was a silhouette of a black female wolf looking forward along the fuselage

- Nieuport 11
- Nieuport 17
- Nieuport 27
- Hanriot HD.1
