= Attilio Imolesi =

- Born: 11 October 1890; Cesena, Kingdom of Italy
- Died: 11 March 1918 (aged 27); Marostica, Kingdom of Italy
- Military career
- Allegiance: Kingdom of Italy
- Branch: Corpo Aeronautico Militare
- Service years: 1915-1918
- Rank: Sergente
- Unit: 79a Squadriglia
- Awards: 1 Gold and 1 Silver Award of Medal for Military Valor

Sergente Attilio Imolesi was a World War I flying ace credited with six aerial victories.

== Biography ==
Attilio Imolesi was born in Cesena, Kingdom of Italy on 11 October 1890. His date of entry into military service is unknown, but he was accepted by the Malpensa flying school of the Corpo Aeronautico Militare on 31 December 1915. He qualified as a pilot on a Maurice Farman 12 on 1 May 1916, and took a more advanced license on a Maurice Farman 14 on 1 July 1916. His original assignment as a pilot was to the Rimini Defense Flight, which was near his home. However, he applied for training as a fighter pilot. He was accepted for training on the Nieuport 11 at Cascina Costa on 2 September. He qualified on the Nieuport as of 25 November. On 30 November 1916, he was posted to 79a Squadriglia in the rank of caporale.

Imolesi made his first combat flight on 21 January 1917. He staked his first victory claim on 2 April 1917, only to have it unconfirmed. On 26 April, he joined Francesco Baracca and another Italian pilot in a triumphant attack on an Austro-Hungarian Hansa-Brandenburg C.I; however, Imolesi's victory claim was disallowed. In May, he was briefly sent to 43a Squadriglia for escorting their reconnaissance craft with his Nieuport 17 fighter.

It would not be until 26 August that he won a shared confirmed victory. He received the Bronze Medal for Military Valor that same day. He scored his second victory on 14 September. After a double victory on 26 September, he was awarded a Silver Medal for Military Valor. After a fifth victory on 13 December, Imolesi ended 1917 as an ace.

Imolesi was promoted to Sergente. He scored his sixth and final victory on 14 January 1918, shared with Antonio Reali. In March, Imolesi would suffer serious injuries, though whether the cause was combat-related or accidental is uncertain. On 11 March 1918, Attilio Imolesi died in the field hospital in Marostica.
