= Marziale Cerutti =

Italian flying ace

- Born: 10 March 1895
- Died: 26 May 1946 (aged 51)
- Military career
- Allegiance: Kingdom of Italy
- Branch: Corpo Aeronautico Militare; Regia Aeronautica
- Service years: 1915–1946
- Rank: General
- Units: 25th Field Artillery Regiment; 79a Squadriglia
- Commands: 6o Gruppo (6th Group); 15o Stormo (15th Wing); 11o Stormo (11th Wing); Servizi Aerei Speciali (Italian Air Transport Command)
- Conflicts: World War I World War II
- Awards: Three Silver awards of the Medal for Military Valor; French Croix de Guerre; Serbian Order of the Star of Karađorđe with Swords
- Other work: Command of Italy's air transport command during World War II

Generale di Brigata Aerea Marziale Cerutti began his military career in Field Artillery, but became a flying ace after his transfer to aviation service. He would be extensively decorated for valour and credited with 17 confirmed aerial victories. He would also remain in Italy's aviation branch after World War I, becoming an officer of increasing importance. He rose through the ranks between the World Wars to become a Wing Commander with the rank of colonnello. During World War II, he served as chief of staff in Italy's North African Headquarters before being placed in command of Italy's air transport command. When Italy declared its armistice on 9 September 1943, Cerutti chose to continue service to Benito Mussolini. This resulted in his suspension from military duties at the end of World War II. He died in a motorcycle accident on 26 May 1946 while awaiting a final determination of his military status.

== Early life and ground service ==
Marziale Cerutti was born in Brescia, the Kingdom of Italy on 10 March 1895. He was conscripted into the Italian Army's 25th Field Artillery Regiment as Italy slid into World War I.

== World War I aerial service ==
Cerutti volunteered for flight training with the Corpo Aeronautico Militare. On 30 November 1915, he began pilot training at the flying school at Pisa. On 15 May 1916, he was promoted to caporal. On 26 June, he began advanced training on Farman reconnaissance two-seaters; on 11 September, on Caproni bombers. Three days later, he began fighter training on Nieuports at Cascina Costa. In November 1916, he was posted as a sergente to his first operational assignment, with 79a Squadriglia.

Cerutti began his career as a fighter pilot with a Nieuport 11 marked with an ace of clubs and the initials "MIR"; the latter stood for Marziale Imperatore Romano (Marziale, the Roman Emperor). When he changed planes to a Nieuport 27 later in the war, he carried the design forward.

Cerutti staked his first victory claim on 14 June 1917; however, he would not have one confirmed until his fourth claim, on 24 November. He would continue to claim victories right through the war's end, ending with three on 27 October 1918. Most of his claims were for solo victories, though he did share two with Antonio Reali, and one each with Antonio Chiri and Giovanni Nicelli. In June 1918, Marziale Cerutti was proposed for commissioning as an officer. However, he finished the war as a sergente.

== Awards and honours ==
- Silver Medal for Military Valor: Awarded in the field ca. December 1917
- Silver Medal for Military Valor: Awarded in the field on 28 January 1918 for the Battle of Asiago
- Silver Medal for Military Valor: Awarded 7 November 1918
- French Croix de Guerre: Awarded March 1918
- Serbian Order of the Star of Karađorđe with Swords

== Between the World Wars ==
Cerutti remained in the Corpo Aeronautico Militare after World War I. On 1 February 1919, a commission from the military intelligence branch that evaluated Italian aerial victories disapproved of his first three and last two claims, but granted him credit for 17 aerial victories during the war. His appointment as a sottotenente came through on 23 March 1919.

As the Corpo Aeronautico Militare morphed into the Regia Aeronautica, Cerutti rose in rank and responsibilities. He commanded 6o Gruppo in 1931. By 1935, he was a Colonnello commanding 15o Stormo. The following year, he transferred to command 11o Stormo.

== World War II ==
At the start of World War II, Cerutti was posted to the Headquarters of the Italian Armed Forces in North Africa. On 28 June 1940, he witnessed the friendly fire death of Marshal Italo Balbo at Tobruk.

On 28 March 1941, he was promoted to the rank of Generale di Brigata Aerea. August 1941 saw him appointed as Chief of Staff of the Italian transport command, the Servizi Aerei Speciale. When the Regia Nautica's loyalties were split by the 8 September 1943 Armistice between Italy and Allied armed forces, General Marziale Cerutti plumped for Benito Mussolini's faction and joined the Aeronautica Nazionale Repubblicana. As a result of this decision, the end of World War II saw Cerutti removed from duty by the victorious Italian Co-Belligerent Air Force faction of the Regia Aeronautica. While awaiting a review of his military status, Generale di Brigata Aerea Marziale Cerutti went for a ride on his home-built motorcycle on 26 May 1946. He was killed in a traffic accident.

== Sources ==
- Franks, Norman; Guest, Russell; Alegi, Gregory. Above the War Fronts: The British Two-seater Bomber Pilot and Observer Aces, the British Two-seater Fighter Observer Aces, and the Belgian, Italian, Austro-Hungarian and Russian Fighter Aces, 1914–1918: Volume 4 of Fighting Airmen of WWI Series: Volume 4 of Air Aces of WWI. Grub Street, 1997. ISBN 1-898697-56-6, ISBN 978-1-898697-56-5.
