= Laurent B. Ruamps =

Laurent Baptisti Ruamps
- Born: 14 February 1897; Saint-Germain-du-Bel-Air, France
- Died: 27 July 1972 (aged 75); Saint-Germain-du-Bel-Air, France
- Military career
- Allegiance: France
- Branch: Aviation
- Rank: Adjutant
- Units: 2e Groupe d'Aviation, Escadrille 87
- Awards: Légion d'honneur, Médaille militaire, Croix de Guerre with eight palmes

Adjutant Laurent Baptisti Ruamps (14 February 1897 – 27 July 1972) was a French flying ace during World War I. He was credited with ten confirmed and four unconfirmed aerial victories.

== Early life ==
On 14 February 1897, Laurent Baptisti Ruamps was born in Saint-Germain-du-Bel-Air.

== World War I ==
=== 1916 ===
On 12 January 1916, Ruamps volunteered for military service. He was assigned to 2e Groupe d'Aviation as a Soldat de 2e classe. On 29 February 1916, the Groupe seconded him to Saint Cyr. He began pilot's training at Dijon on 30 September.

=== 1917 ===
He was awarded Military Pilot's Brevet No. 5257 on 24 January 1917. He continued his training at Châteauroux and Avord. On 27 March 1917, he was promoted to Corporal. On 22 April, he was forwarded to Pau for advanced training. On 17 May, he was assigned to Escadrille 42. On 21 August, he shot down a two-seater reconnaissance craft over Pagny-sur-Meuse. Four days later, he was promoted to Sergeant.

=== 1918 ===
On 4 January 1918, Ruamps shared a victory with Gilbert Sardier. Ruamps was promoted to Adjutant on 20 February 1918. On 8 April, he received a Médaille militaire to accompany his Croix de Guerre. Ruamps would go on to score eight more victories before war's end, including a pair shared with Charles J. V. Macé and Maurice Bizot. Ruamps ended the war with 530 hours flight time.

== Post World War I ==
On 11 July 1920, he became a Chevalier in the Légion d'honneur. He would rise within the Legion twice, to Officier in 1936, and to Commandeur in July 1961.

== See also ==
- Family memoirs at fr:Laurent Ruamps contains personal recollections of Ruamp by his grandson
