= Gilbert Sardier =

Jean Marie Luc Gilbert Sardier
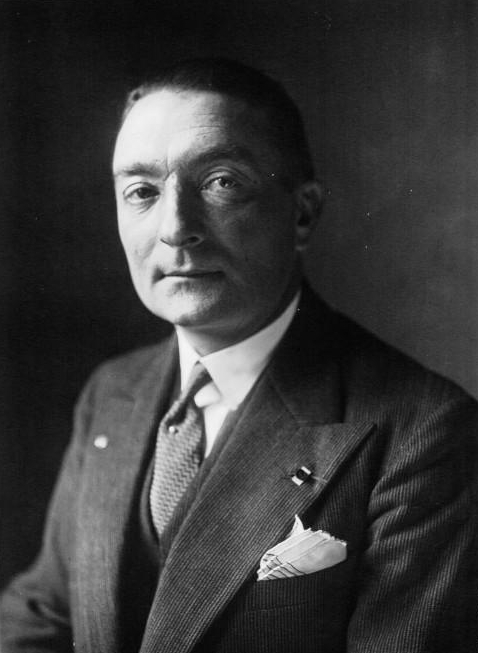
- Born: 5 May 1897; Riom, France
- Died: 7 October 1976 (aged 79); Clermont-Ferrand, France
- Military career
- Allegiance: France
- Branch: Aviation
- Rank: Lieutenant
- Units: Escadrille 77; Escadrille 48
- Commands: Escadrille 48
- Awards: Légion d'honneur Médaille militaire Croix de Guerre; American Distinguished Service Cross; British Military Medal

Lieutenant Jean Marie Luc Gilbert Sardier (1897–1976) was a World War I flying ace credited with 15 aerial victories. He remained active in aviation following World War I. During World War II, he was deeply involved in a veterans organization that collaborated with the occupying Nazis.

== Early life and entry into military ==
Jean Marie Luc Gilbert Sardier was born in Riom, France on 5 May 1897.

On 8 September 1914, he volunteered to serve his country until war's end, and was accepted as a cavalryman. On 22 September 1915, he was posted to aviation's Escadrille 1. On 22 February 1916, he began instruction to become a pilot. He received his Military Pilot's Brevet on 19 May 1916. On 10 June 1916, he was also breveted as an aerial observer.

Sardier joined Escadrille N.77 at its inception, on 29 September 1916.

== Aerial service in World War I ==
His victory list began on 7 November 1916, with his second on 3 June 1917; his 1918 skein of 13 victories began 4 January and nearly ran to war's end. On one occasion, he shot down three Germans in a single day; another day, two fell to his guns. During this long run, he teamed with several other aces in scoring, including fellow aces Maurice Boyau, Laurent B. Ruamps, Francis Guerrier, and Marcel Haegelen. Sardier was a balloon buster, with five observation balloons among his 15 triumphs.

On 5 July 1918, he was appointed to lead the squadron. By war's end, he had flown 241 hours combat time with them.

== Interwar period ==
Sardier remained in aviation after war's end. He joined with Louis Chartoire to establish the Aero-Club d'Auvergne on 8 May 1920. In August 1922, he flew his triplane glider at a convention of experimental gliders that took place near his home. President of the club, he attended a Marseille-based national convention of aero clubs on 16 and 17 September 1932. One of the first French flying clubs, it still exists today.

== World War II activities ==
During World War II, Sardier was head of the Clermont-Ferrand branch of Legion Française de Combattants, a veterans group founded on 30 August 1940. From its original role as a veterans aid society, the Legion slid into the role of siding with the Vichy Government installed by the occupying German Nazis. Although records are lacking, it seems that Sardier was one of the Legion officials who denounced fellow French citizens who espoused left wing political views. Despite this, the occupying Germans not only would not share information about French citizens detained; they evicted Sardier from his home and housed a German colonel there.

== Post World War II ==
Gilbert Sardier died on 7 October 1976.

== Honors and awards ==
- Chevalier of the Legion d'honneur: 30 June 1918
- Officier of the 'Legion d'honneur: 27 December 1918
- Médaille militaire: 17 September 1917
- Croix de Guerre with nine palmes, an etoile de vermeil, and one etoile de argent
- American Distinguished Service Cross
- British Military Cross
