= Escadrille Spa.77 =

- Active: 1916–1918
- Country: France
- Branch: French Air Service
- Type: Fighter/photo recon Squadron
- Battle honours: Twice Cited in orders

Escadrille Spa.77 (originally Escadrille N.77) was a French fighter and photo reconnaissance squadron active from 1916 to 1918 during the First World War. They were credited with the destruction of 34 German airplanes and observation balloons, as well as extensive photo intelligence coverage of enemy positions.

== History ==
Escadrille Spa.77 was founded on 19 September 1916 at Lyon-Bron, France. It was equipped with Nieuport XII and Nieuport XVII fighters, leading to its original designation of Escadrille N.77. It was assigned to VIII Armee. By April 1917, the Nieuport XIIs were gone, and the unit had added Nieuport XXIVs, and a few SPAD VII fighters. In June, they received Nieuport XXIVs. By September 1917, they had become entirely equipped with SPADs. They were redesignated Escadrille Spa.77.

On 5 February 1918, the squadron, along with three others, had been incorporated into Groupe de Combat 17. Later that month, Groupe de Combat 17 joined other Groupes in Escadre de Combat No. 2. On 14 May, the Escadre was itself posted into the 1er Division Aerienne.

Although details of combat operations are lacking, Escadrille Spa.77 was obviously engaged; it was cited in orders on 18 July 1918 for downing 22 German airplanes and 13 observation balloons. Their extensive photo reconnaissance missions were also lauded for producing 1,000 photos. Their second time being cited in orders, on 9 October 1918, credited the squadron with destruction of 34 German airplanes and 25 observation balloons. The unit would destroy one more observation balloon before the Armistice on 11 November 1918.

== Commanding officers ==
- Lieutenant Joseph de l'Hermite: 19 September 1916 - 19 July 1917
- Capitaine Pierre Muranval: 19 July 1917
- Lieutenant Henri Decoin: 30 May 1918
- Sous lieutenant Gilbert Sardier: 5 July 1918

== Notable members ==
- Lieutenant Maurice Boyau
- Lieutenant Gilbert Sardier
- Lieutenant Alexandre Marty
- Sous lieutenant Yves F. Barbaza
- Adjutant Francis Guerrier

== Aircraft ==
- Nieuport XII: 19 September 1916 - early 1917
- Nieuport XVII: 19 September 1916 - September 1917
- Nieuport XXIV: April 1917 - September 1917
- SPAD VII: April 1917
