= Maurice Bizot =

- Born: 5 November 1896; Puéchabon, France
- Died: 27 November 1925 (aged 29)
- Military career
- Allegiance: France
- Branch: Artillery; aviation
- Rank: Adjutant
- Unit: Escadrille 90
- Awards: Légion d'honneur, Médaille militaire, Croix de Guerre with six palmes, Mentioned in Dispatches seven times

Adjutant Maurice Bizot (November 5, 1896 – November 27, 1925) was a French World War I flying ace credited with ten confirmed aerial victories.

== Early life ==
Maurice Bizot was born in Puéchabon on 27 November 1896.

== World War I ==
Bizot joined the French military on 8 January 1915. Rated a soldat de 2e classe, he was assigned to 11^{e} Regiment d'Artillerie à pied. He was promoted to enlisted Brigadier on 6 April 1915. On 13 March 1916, he was transferred to 82eme Regiment d'Artillerie lourde. On 12 May 1917, he began pilot's training at Dijon. On 9 July 1917, at Istres, he was granted Military Pilot's Brevet No. 7370. He was then sent for advanced training at Avord and Pau. He reached a combat unit, Escadrille 90, on 13 October 1917. On 25 January 1918, he was promoted to Sergeant. He used a Nieuport to score his first two wins on 27 March 1918, sharing the victories with Charles J. V. Macé and Laurent B. Ruamps. Escadrille 90 upgraded to Spads, and Bizot used one for the remainder of his victories, which ran from 30 July through 29 October 1918. He teamed with fellow aces Jean Andre Pezon and Marius Ambrogi, as well as other French pilots in this series of assaults, which brought down seven observation balloons and put Bizot solidly on the list of balloon busters.

He was promoted to Adjutant on 1 August 1918. He was awarded the Médaille militaire on 5 September 1918. He also had been awarded the Croix de guerre with six palmes during the war.

== Honors and awards ==
Médaille Militaire citation
Pilot of admirable courage, always volunteers for perilous missions. He has executed numerous bombardments and reconnaissances at low altitudes very far behind enemy lines. On 2 September 1918, he destroyed a balloon in flames and was severely wounded, returning to our lines at 200 meters above the ground. Two hundred hours of flight against the enemy. Four aircraft destroyed, three citations.

Légion d'Honneur citation
Pursuit pilot of exceptional value. Has executed numerous bombardments and reconnaissances at low altitudes. Has downed three planes and seven balloons. One wound, six citations.

== Postwar ==
On 27 November 1925, Bizot was flying an air racer he was prepping for a world's speed record. He attempted a landing at over 100 mph (160 km/h), overturned the plane, and died in the accident.
