= Alexandre Marty =

French flying ace

Alexandre Paul Leon Madeleine Marty
- Born: 9 February 1894; Toulon, France
- Died: 9 June 1918 (aged 24); Vicinity of Plainfaing, France
- Military career
- Allegiance: France
- Branch: Aviation
- Rank: Lieutenant
- Units: Escadrille 77; Escadrille 90
- Awards: Legion d'Honneur; Croix de Guerre

Lieutenant Alexandre Paul Leon Madeleine Marty was a French World War I flying ace credited with seven aerial victories.

== Biography ==
See also Aerial victory standards of World War I

Alexandre Paul Leon Madeleine Marty was born in Toulon, France, on 9 February 1894.

He had a successful career in the cavalry, rising through the enlisted ranks before being confirmed in officer-hood as a Sous lieutenant on 21 July 1916. On 26 August 1916, he was detached to pilot training at Avord. Rather unusually, he earned a Civil Pilot's Brevet on 2 October 1916. Details of his ensuing Military Pilot's Brevet are not known. However, once trained, he was posted to Escadrille N.77. He must have arrived at his new posting before 3 May 1917, as he scored his first aerial victory the day before. He would score two more before he was promoted to Lieutenant on 6 July 1917. Five days later, he was made a Chevalier de la Légion d'Honneur. He would shoot down two more German airplanes, becoming a flying ace on 17 October 1917. On 5 November 1917, serious injuries from a crash-landing in rugged terrain saw him invalided him out of his squadron.

Marty's returned from sick leave on 14 April 1918; he was assigned to Escadrille Spa.90. He shot down two more German planes, on 23 April and 8 June 1918. The next day, 9 June 1918, at 9 AM, Alexandre Marty was killed in action in the vicinity of Plainfaing.

== Honors and awards ==
Chevalier de la Légion d'Honneur
"Marty, Alexandre Paul Leon Madeleine, lieutenant (Active) of the 21st Regiment of Light Cavalry, pilot of Escadrille N77, pursuit pilot of the first order who demonstrates with each new day his mastery of combat. On 2 May 1917, 28 June 1917 and 3 July 1917, he downed his first three enemy planes. Cited twice in orders." Chevalier de la Légion d'Honneur citation, 2 July 1917

Marty also won the Croix de Guerre.
