= Marius Ambrogi =

French fighter pilot

Marius Jean Paul Elzeard Ambrogi
- Born: 9 June 1895; Marseilles, France
- Died: 25 April 1971 (aged 75)
- Military career
- Allegiance: France
- Branch: French Army; French Air Force
- Rank: Lieutenant Colonel
- Nickname: "Marc"
- Units: Escadrille 507; Escadrille 90
- Awards: Légion d'honneur Médaille militaire Croix de Guerre with 10 Palmes and a Star

Lieutenant Colonel Marius Jean Paul Elzeard Ambrogi (9 June 1895 – 25 April 1971), using "Marc" as common first name, was a French fighter pilot in both World Wars. He became a flying ace during World War I, with fourteen aerial victories, then added another during World War II. He was one of the leading balloon busters, with 11 observation balloons destroyed to his credit.

== World War I ==
Ambrogi joined the French army on 25 September 1914 and originally served in the 2e Infantry Regiment. He transferred to the army's aviation branch and trained at Dijon and Juvisy. He received his pilot's brevet, no. 4477, on 16 September 1916. He completed his training at Avord, Cazaux, and Pau, finishing up in February 1917. Afterwards, he received his first posting, to Detachment N507 in March. On 10 April, he was forwarded to Escadrille 90, which was operating on the VIIe Army front.

He began scoring when he joined Escadrille 90, which was equipped with Nieuports. Between 30 October 1917 and 16 May 1918, he scored three victories using a Nieuport, including a shared one with Marie Lecoq De Kerland. Beginning on 17 May, Ambrogi switched to a Spad and began a string of eleven balloons destroyed. He teamed with several other balloon busting aces to do this, such as Maurice Bizot, Jean Andre Pezon, and Charles J. V. Macé. Ambrogi's final World War I victory was a double on 18 October 1918.

== Between the World Wars ==
Ambrogi left French military aviation in 1920. He would become first an officer, then a Commander in the Légion d'honneur.

== World War II ==
Commandant Ambrogi returned to duty for World War II. He used Bloch 152C-1 No. 231 of GC 1/8, marked with a tricolor stripe denoting acedom, as well as a tail-flash of Walt Disney's Dopey, to down a Dornier Do 17 on 18 May 1940 over Cambrai. He was also promoted to Lieutenant Colonel.

== Post World War II ==
Ambrogi was active in a veteran airman's association, the Vielles Tiges. He became President of l'Aero Club de Provence.

Ambrogi died on 25 April 1971. He was interred at d'Artignose-sur-Verdun, France.

== Honors and awards ==
Médaille militaire
"A pilot who never ceases to distinguish himself by his spirit, and the ease with which he brilliantly accomplishes his daily duties. He has downed two adversaries who were seen falling disabled in their own lines. On 6 January 1918, he downed another enemy plane. Three citations."
