= Escadrille Spa.87 =

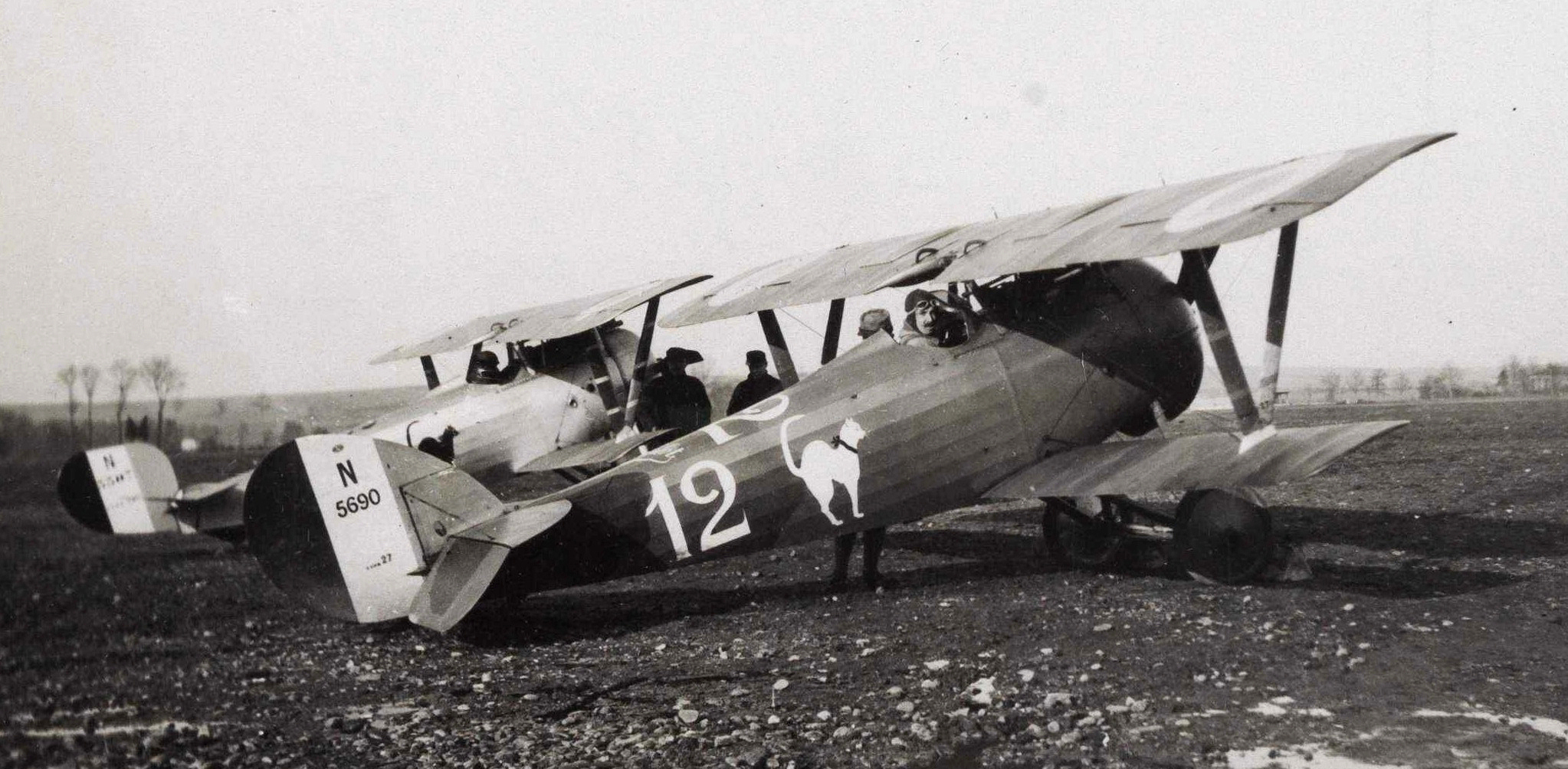
- Nieuport 27 and Nieuport 24 of the Escadrille N.87, 1917.
- Active: 1917–1918
- Country: France
- Branch: French Air Service
- Type: Fighter Squadron

Escadrille Spa.87 (also known as Escadrille N.87) was a French fighter squadron active during the First World War, from March 1917 to the Armistice. They were credited with 28 confirmed victories over enemy aircraft,

== History ==
Escadrille Spa.87 was founded at Lyon-Bron, France on 8 March 1917 as a Nieuport fighter squadron called Escadrille N.87. It was attached to a French field army, VIII Armee, until 1 July 1918.

The squadron re-equipped with SPAD S.7 and SPAD S.13 fighters on 4 May 1918, and was renamed Escadrille Spa.87. By the Armistice, the fighter squadron had been credited with destroying 28 enemy aircraft.

== Commanding officers ==
- Unknown: 8 March 1917 - 1 January 1918
- Capitaine Pierre Azire: 1 January 1918 - 30 June 1918
- Lieutenant Joseph Jochaud du Plessis: 30 June 1918 - war's end

== Notable members ==
- Adjutant Laurent B. Ruamps
- Adjutant Lucien Gasser
- Maréchal des logis William A. Wellman

== Aircraft ==
- March 1918 inventory:
  - Four Nieuport 24s
  - Three Nieuport 27s
  - Two SPAD S.7s
- 4 May 1918 refitting:
  - SPAD S.7
  - SPAD S.13
