= Charles J. V. Macé =

French flying ace (1898–1919)

Charles Jean Vincent Macé
- Born: 5 April 1898; Pau, France
- Died: 7 June 1919 (aged 21); Haguenau, France
- Military career
- Allegiance: France
- Branch: Cavalry; artillery; aviation
- Service years: 1915–1919
- Rank: Adjutant
- Units: 23^{e} Régiment de Dragoons, 12^{e} Regiment d'Artillerie, Escadrille 90
- Awards: Médaille militaire, Croix de Guerre with seven palmes, Mentioned in Dispatches four times

Adjutant Charles Jean Vincent Macé (5 April 1898 – 7 June 1919) was a French flying ace during World War I. He shot down eight German observation balloons and four enemy airplanes for confirmed victories.

== Early life ==
Charles Jean Vincent Macé was born on 5 April 1898 in Pau.

== Military service ==
Charles Macé volunteered for military service for the duration of hostilities on 21 October 1915, when he was still only 17 years old. His initial assignment was to the 23^{e} Régiment de Dragoons. On 30 May 1916, he transferred from the Dragoons to the 12^{e} Regiment d'Artillerie. On 22 July 1917, he was forwarded to the 2^{e} Groupe d'Aviation for pilot's training. After completing training, he was posted to Escadrille 90. A promotion to Sergeant followed on 5 December 1917.

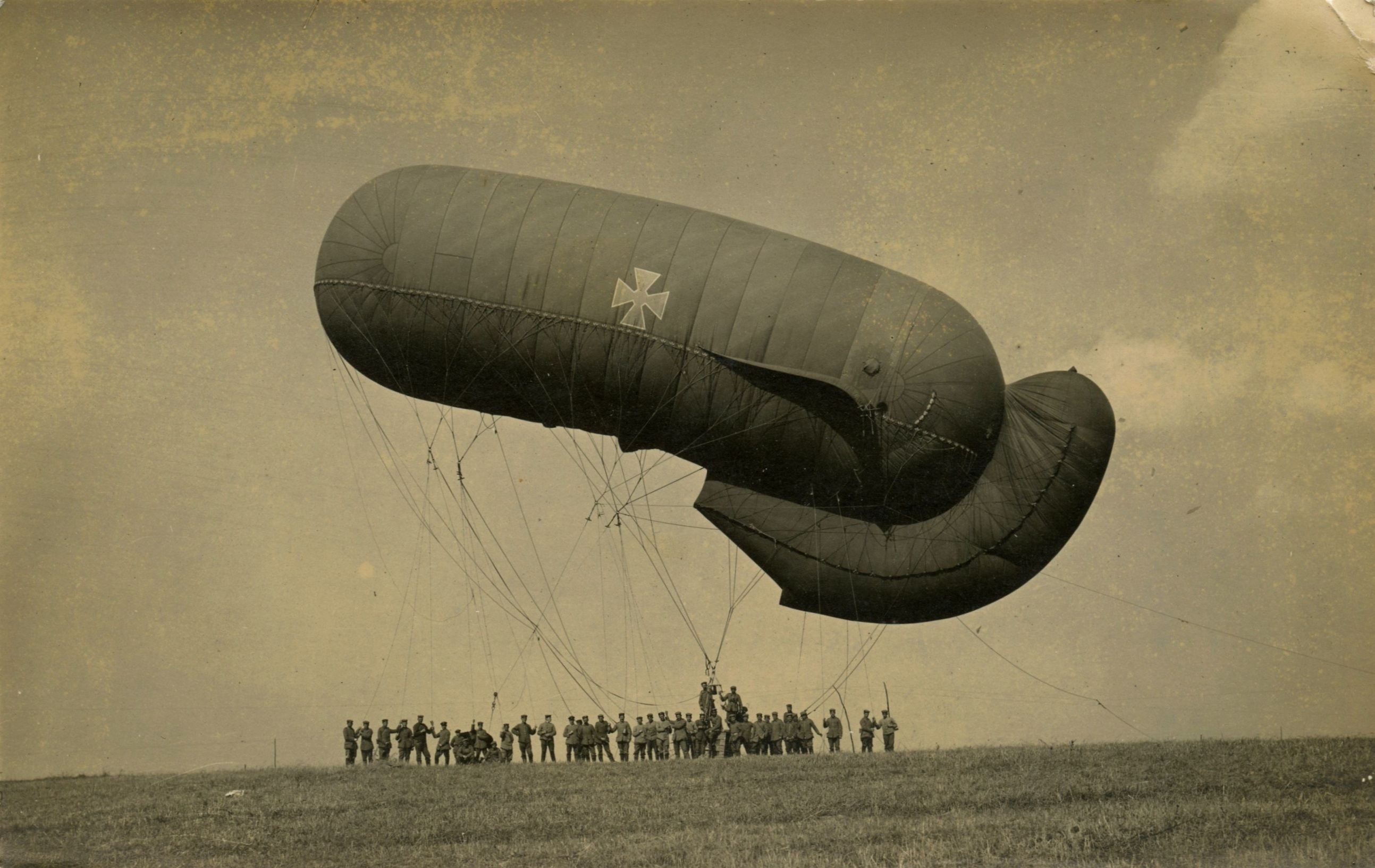
German observation balloons were Macé's frequent target.

Macé scored his first two victories on 27 March 1918, sharing them with Maurice Bizot and Laurent Ruamps. He was then promoted to Adjutant on 24 April 1918. On 24 August, Macé shot down his third German airplane, a two-seater. On 15 September 1918, he began a string of triumphs that blinded the Germans by depriving them of the observation balloons they used to direct their artillery fire. Macé and Marius Ambrogi downed one of the lethal gasbags over Geline on that date. A week later, Macé torched two more of the airborne observation platforms in the same vicinity. Jean Andre Pezon aided him on 10 October; this was another win over Geline. The 18th saw victories near Ommeray and Avricourt, with Ambrogi and another French sergeant pilot helping. The 22nd saw two more wins in the vicinity of Geline. On the 28th, Macé shot down a Hannover CL for his final victory. He ended his war a balloon buster ace, with eight to his credit, as well four triumphs over German airplanes.

The citation for the Médaille militaire that Macé received a few days later, on 2 November 1918, encapsulated his feats:

"Self-sacrificing, audacious, and unselfish pilot who is an excellent example to all. He has returned sixteen times with his clothes and aircraft shot through by enemy fire. He has destroyed two planes and one balloon. On 22 September [1918], he reported two new victories by flaming two enemy observation balloons. Four citations."

He had also been awarded the Croix de guerre with seven palmes.

== Postwar career ==
Macé survived the war, but was killed in a flying accident on 7 June 1919 at Hagenau.
