= Jean André Pezon =

- Born: 10 March 1898; Saint-Pierre-le-Moûtier, France
- Died: 24 August 1980 (aged 82)
- Military career
- Allegiance: France
- Branch: Artillery; aviation
- Service years: 1915–1952
- Rank: Lieutenant colonel
- Units: 5^{e} Regiment d'Artillerie d'Afrique; 58^{e} Regiment d'Artillerie d'Afrique; 5^{e} Groupe d'Artillerie d'Afrique; Escadrille 90
- Awards: Légion d'honneur Médaille militaire Croix de guerre with five palmes and two etoiles de bronze Tunisian Ordre du Micham-Iftikhar

Lieutenant Colonel Jean André Pezon began his military career during World War I and became a flying ace credited with ten confirmed aerial victories. He served his nation throughout World War II.

== Early life ==
Jean André Pezon was born in Saint-Pierre-le-Moûtier on 19 March 1898.

== World War I ==
Pezon volunteered for military service on 4 September 1915, while he was still 17 years old. He was assigned to various artillery units until he was forwarded to Dijon for pilot's training on 27 February 1917. He moved on to Étampes on 12 March. On 22 May 1917, he was awarded Military Pilot's Brevet No. 6485. On 7 August, he was promoted to enlisted Brigadier and forwarded to Avord and Pau for advanced training.

On 1 January 1918, Pezon was assigned to Escadrille 90 as a Spad fighter pilot. On 16 March, he was promoted to Maréchal-des-logis. On 17 May 1918, he began his campaign against German aerial observers by teaming with Marius Ambrogi to destroy an enemy observation balloon near Juville. Cooperating with Ambrogi, Maurice Bizot, Charles J. V. Macé, and other French pilots, Pezon drove his score as a balloon buster to nine by 29 October 1918; he also downed a German two-seater reconnaissance plane.

Pezon's professional success paralleled his victory string. He was advanced to Adjutant on 25 June 1918. He was awarded the Médaille militaire on 5 October to add to his Croix de guerre; the text of the accompanying citation noted, "He has returned frequently from missions with his plane rendered unfit for further use by enemy fire."

== Post World War I ==
On 22 June 1919, having been mentioned six times in dispatches, he was appointed a Chevalier de la Légion d'honneur; the citation noted that he pressed home an attack on a German troop train to "within 30 metres". On 16 August, he was commissioned a Sous lieutenant. Exactly two years later, he was promoted to Lieutenant.

He was elevated within the Légion d'honneur in 1936, becoming an Officier. The following year, on 14 July, he was promoted to Captain; it was a reserve commission.

On 25 June 1944, he was again promoted within the reserves, to Commandant. On 1 February 1952, he received his final promotion, to lieutenant colonel. The last day of 1952, the Légion d'honneur made him a Commandeur. He was also appointed an Officier in the Tunisian Ordre du Micham-Iftikhar.

When Jean Andre Pezon died on 24 August 1980, he was the last known living French ace from World War I.

== Honors and awards ==
Médaille Militaire

A fearless pilot with the will to prove it to all. He has rendered valuable service for the army by carrying out 20 severe combats in a scout, at low altitude and with particularly favorable results. He reported his third victory on 2 September 1918 by downing a balloon in flames, which he followed to the ground. He has returned frequently from missions with his plane rendered unfit for further use by enemy fire. Four citations. Médaille Militaire citation, 5 October 1918

Chevalier de la Légion d'Honneur

A non-commissioned officer and pilot credited with ten official victories. On 30 March 1918, he attacked a train at Château-Salins carrying enemy troops. During the attack, 17 soldiers were killed and 28 wounded. He returned to his airfield with his aircraft damaged by bullets and shrapnel despite anti-aircraft fire. He was awarded the Médaille Militaire, received six citations and was made Chevalier of the Légion d'Honneur on 22 June 1919.
