= Charles Godefroy =

French aviator (1888–1958)

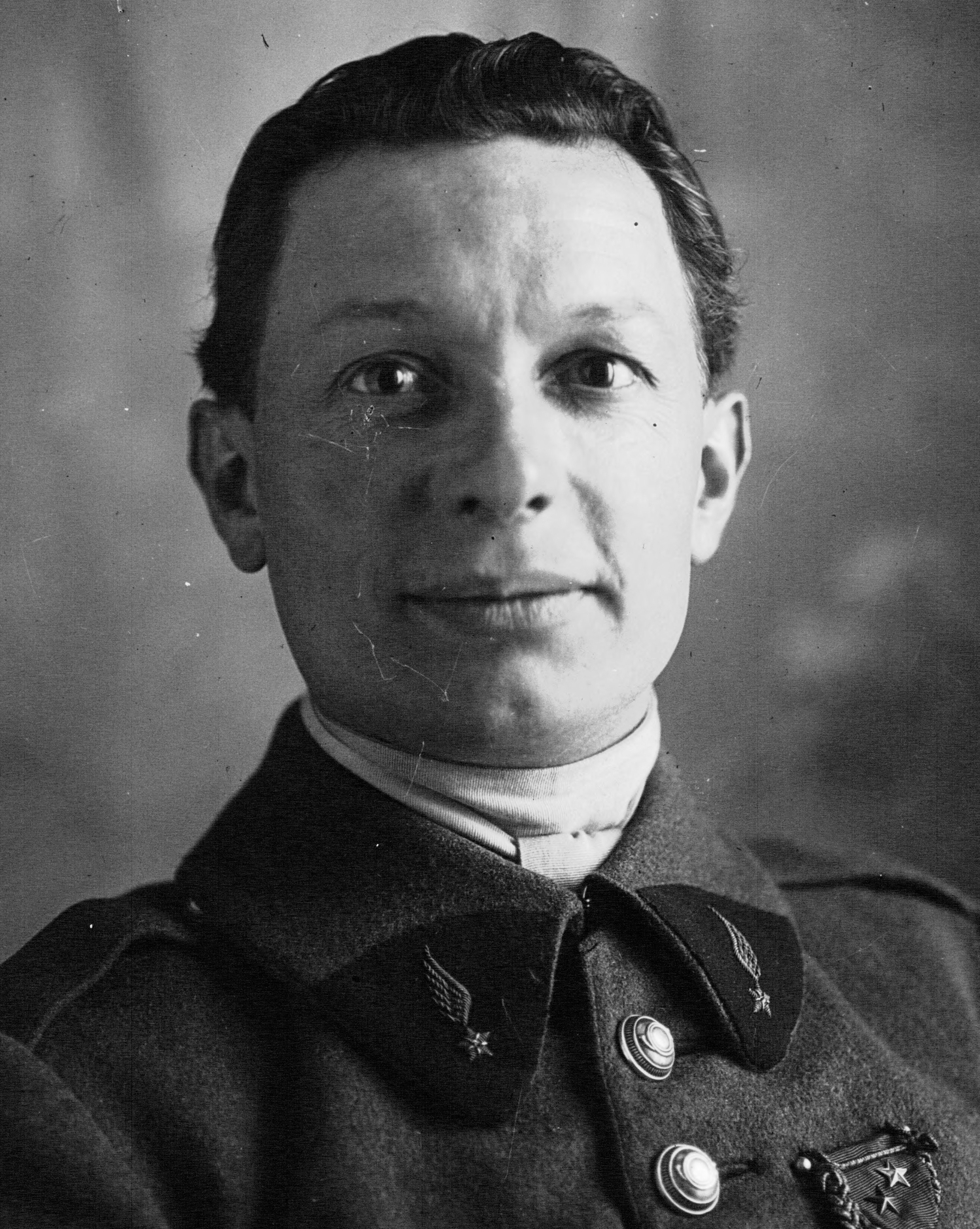
- Charles Godefroy in 1919
- Born: 29 December 1888; La Flèche, France
- Died: 11 December 1958 (aged 69); Soisy-sous-Montmorency, France
- Military career
- Allegiance: France
- Branch: French Army
- Service years: 1914–1919
- Rank: Chief warrant officer
- Conflicts: World War I
- Awards: Croix de guerre 1914–1918

Charles Godefroy (29 December 1888 at La Flèche (Sarthe) – 11 December 1958 at Soisy-sous-Montmorency (Val d'Oise), north of Paris) was a French aviator who became famous for flying through the Arc de Triomphe in Paris in 1919.

== World War I ==
He was called up for military service in 1914 at the age of 26 years. After being wounded and a stay in hospital, he entered the French Air Force on 1 September 1917. He completed his training on a Nieuport fighter at Miramas in November 1918. Because of his abilities as a pilot, he quickly became a flying instructor.

== Arc de Triomphe flight ==
=== Background ===
France planned a victory parade on the Champs Élysées on 14 July 1919 to mark the end of hostilities in World War I. The military command ordered airmen to participate on foot, like the infantry. This was a provocation to the pilots, who regarded themselves as "heroes of the air". At a meeting at Le Fouquet's, a bar on the Champs Élysées, a group of aviators decided to address this affront by selecting one of them to fly through the Arc de Triomphe during the parade. The choice fell on Jean Navarre, a flying ace with 12 air victories. But Navarre died in a practice flight on 10 July.

Godefroy, who had 500 flying hours at the time, volunteered to make the flight in Navarre's stead. With journalist Jacques Mortane, his close companion, Godefroy inspected the Arc de Triomphe several times to examine the air route and the air currents. He practiced at the bridge over the Small Rhône at Miramas.

=== Flight ===
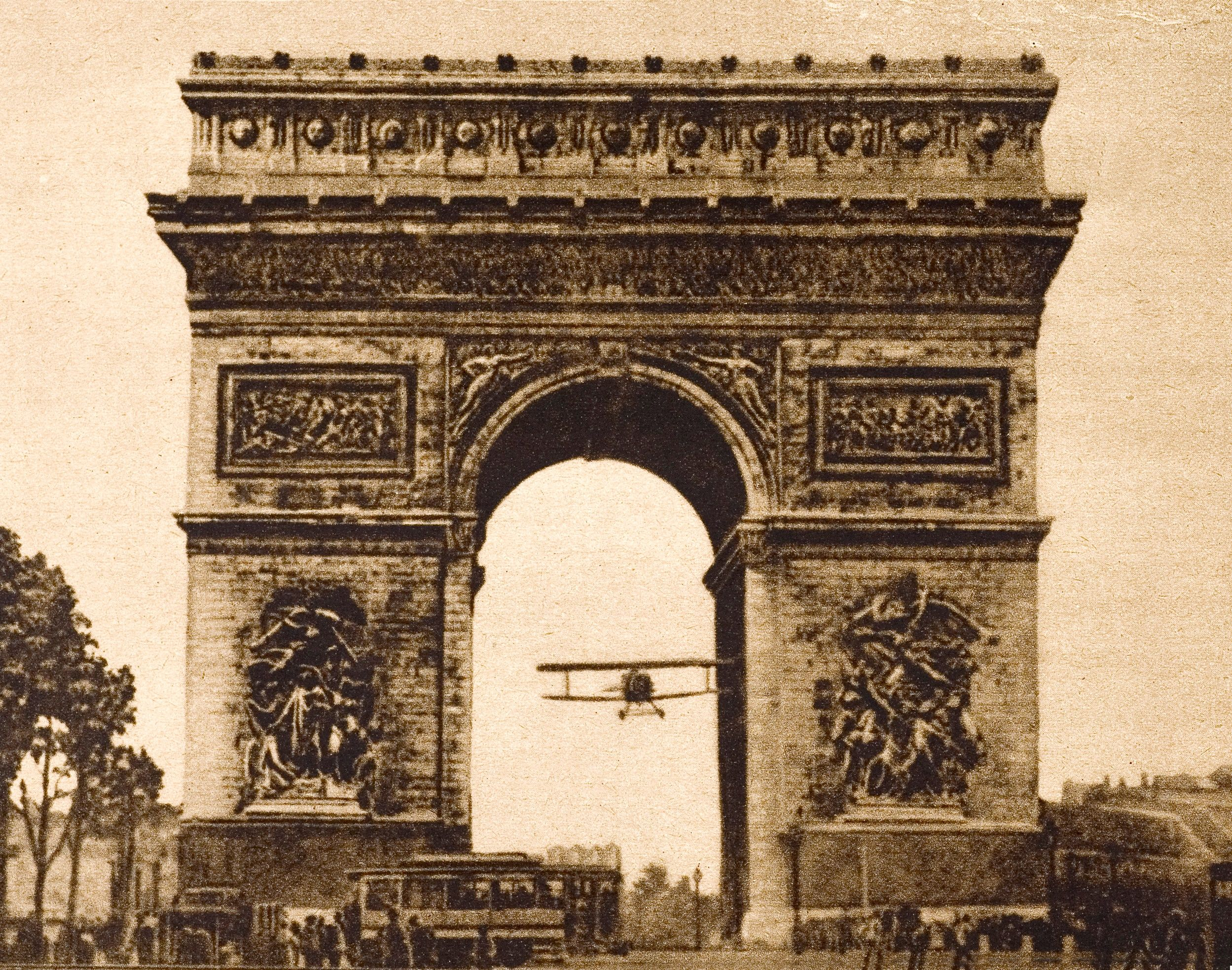
Godefroy passing through the Arc de Triomphe.

On 7 August 1919, three weeks after the victory parade, under cover of secrecy and dressed in his warrant officer uniform, Godefroy took off at 7:20 a.m. from the airfield of Villacoublay in a Nieuport 27 sesquiplane and soon reached the Porte Maillot. Coming from the west, he circled the Arc de Triomphe twice and began his approach along the Avenue de la Grande-Armée. He gathered speed and forced the plane down and through the Arc. He did not have much clearance – the width of the Arc is 14.50 m (47.6 ft), not much more than his aircraft's wingspan of 8.21 m (26.9 ft). He passed at a low level over a tram in which passengers threw themselves to the ground, and many passers-by ran away frightened. Godefroy then flew over the Place de la Concorde and returned to the airfield, where his mechanic checked over the engine. No one at the airfield had taken any notice of the flight, which had lasted half an hour.

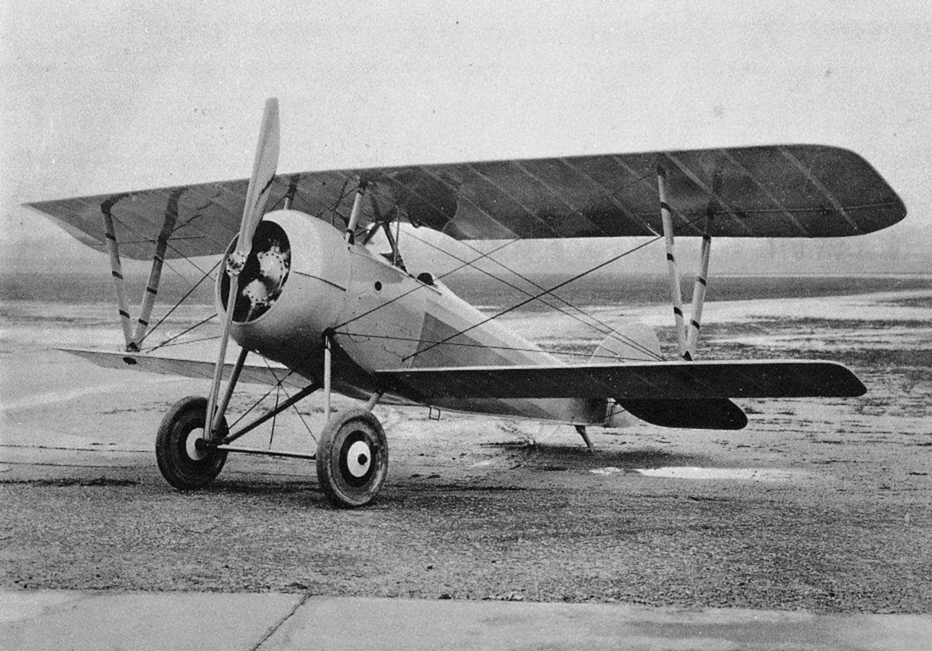
Nieuport 27 sesquiplane.

Mortane had the whole event filmed and photographed. The film screening was banned by the Commissioner of Police. Godefroy stayed officially in the background, but his name could not be kept secret for long. The authorities disapproved of the event and were afraid of it being imitated, but Godefroy escaped with only a warning.

Articles have since been published in many newspapers.

== Later life ==
After this exploit, Godefroy had to promise his family to give up flying. Thereafter, he attended to his wine trade in Aubervilliers. He died shortly before his 70th birthday at Soisy-sous-Montmorency. The municipality named a street after him and set up a memorial stone.

There have been two subsequent flights under the Arc, in 1981 and 1991.

== Sources ==
- Melville Wallace — La vie d'un Pilote de Chasse en 1914-1918, Flammarion, Paris, 1978.
- Les débuts de l'aviation: Charles Godefroy
- Exploits de l'Aviation — Film of the flight
- Les Vieilles Tiges
