= Puéchabon =

Puéchabon Puèg-Abon (Occitan)
- Commune
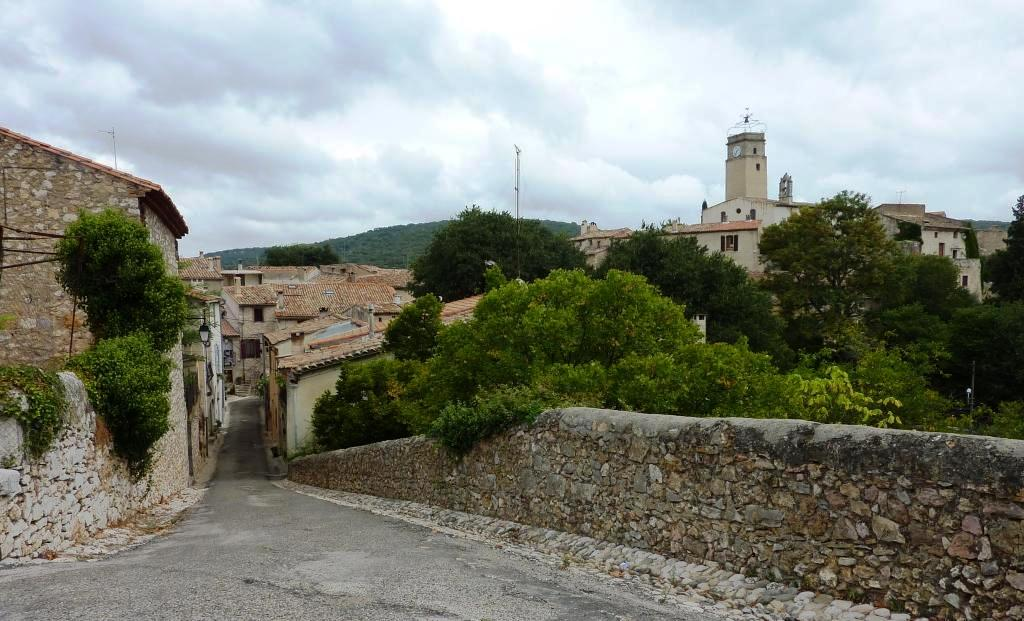
- A general view of Puéchabon

- Coat of arms
- Location of Puéchabon
- Location within France Location within Occitanie
- Coordinates: 43°42′55″N 3°37′06″E
- Country: France
- Region: Occitania
- Department: Hérault
- Arrondissement: Lodève
- Canton: Gignac
- Intercommunality: Vallée de l'Hérault

Government
  - Mayor (2025–2026): Stéphane Simon
- Area^{1}: 31.26 km^{2} (12.07 sq mi)
- Elevation: 110 m (360 ft)
- Highest elevation: 483 m (1,585 ft)
- Lowest elevation: 54 m (177 ft)
- Population (2023): 509
  - Density: 16.3/km^{2} (42.2/sq mi)
- Demonym: Puéchabonais
- Time zone: UTC+01:00 (CET)
  - Summer (DST): UTC+02:00 (CEST)
- INSEE/Postal code: 34221 /34150
- Website: communedepuechabon.fr
- ^{1} French Land Register data, which excludes lakes, ponds, glaciers > 1 km^{2} (0.386 sq mi or 247 acres) and river estuaries.

Puéchabon (French pronunciation: [pɥeʃabɔ̃]; Occitan: Puèg-Abon, [pɥɛt͡ʃ.a'bu]) is a commune in the Hérault department in the Occitanie region in Southern France.

== Geography ==
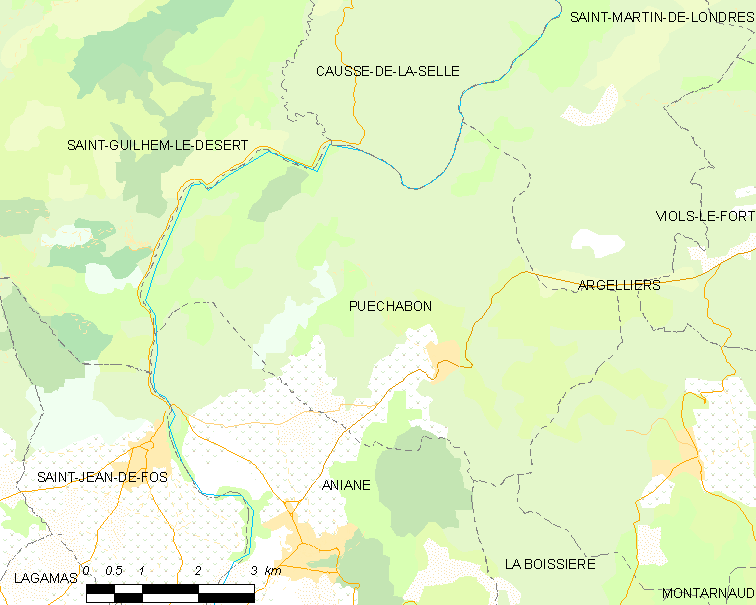
Map

The commune borders Causse-de-la-Selle to the north, Saint-Guilhem-le-Désert to the north and west, Aniane to the south, and La Boissière to the southeast.

=== Climate ===
In 2010, the climate of the commune is classified as a frank Mediterranean climate, according to a study based on a dataset covering the 1971-2000 period. In 2020, Météo-France published a typology of climates in mainland France in which the commune is exposed to a Mediterranean climate and is part of the Provence, Languedoc-Roussillon climatic region, characterized by low rainfall in summer, very good sunshine (2,600 h/year), a hot summer 21.5 °C (71 °F), very dry air in summer, dry conditions in all seasons, strong winds (with a frequency of 40 to 50% for winds > 5 m/s), and little fog.

For the 1971-2000 period, the average annual temperature was 14 °C (57 °F) with an annual atmospheric temperature of 16 °C (61 °F). The average annual total rainfall during this period was 931 mm, with 6.9 days of precipitation in January and 3.1 days in July. For the subsequent period of 1991 to 2020, the average annual temperature observed at the nearest weather station, located in the commune of Saint-André-de-Sangonis, 12 kilometres (7 mi) away as the crow flies, is 15.5 °C (60 °F), and the average annual total rainfall is 652.4 mm.

For the future, climate parameters for the commune projected for 2050, based on different greenhouse gas emission scenarios, can be consulted on a dedicated website published by Météo-France in November 2022.

== Urbanism ==
=== Typology ===
As of 1 January 2024, Puéchabon is classified as a ‘commune rurale à habitat dispersé’ (rural commune with dispersed settlement) according to the new seven-level commune density grid established by Insee in 2022. The commune is located outside of any urban unit. Additionally, Puéchabon belongs to the Montpellier attraction area, where it is designated as a commuter town. (Note: The concept of a functional area replaced the former concept of an urban area in October 2020, enabling consistent comparisons with other European Union countries.) This area, encompassing 161 communes, falls under the category of areas with 700,000 inhabitants or more (excluding Paris).

=== Land Use ===
The land use in the commune, as recorded in the European biophysical land use database, Corine Land Cover (CLC), is characterized by a high proportion of forests and semi-natural habitats, accounting 90.8% in 2018, an approximately equivalent proportion compared to that of 1990, 91.2%. The detailed distribution in 2018 was as follows: shrub and/or herbaceous vegetation environments (67.4%), forests (20.3%), permanent crops (7%), open spaces, with little or no vegetation (3.1%), urban areas (1.1%), heterogeneous agricultural areas (1.1%). Changes in the commune’s land use and infrastructure can be observed on various cartographic representations of the area: the Cassini map (18th century), the military topographic map (1820–1866), and IGN maps or aerial photographs from 1950 to the present day.

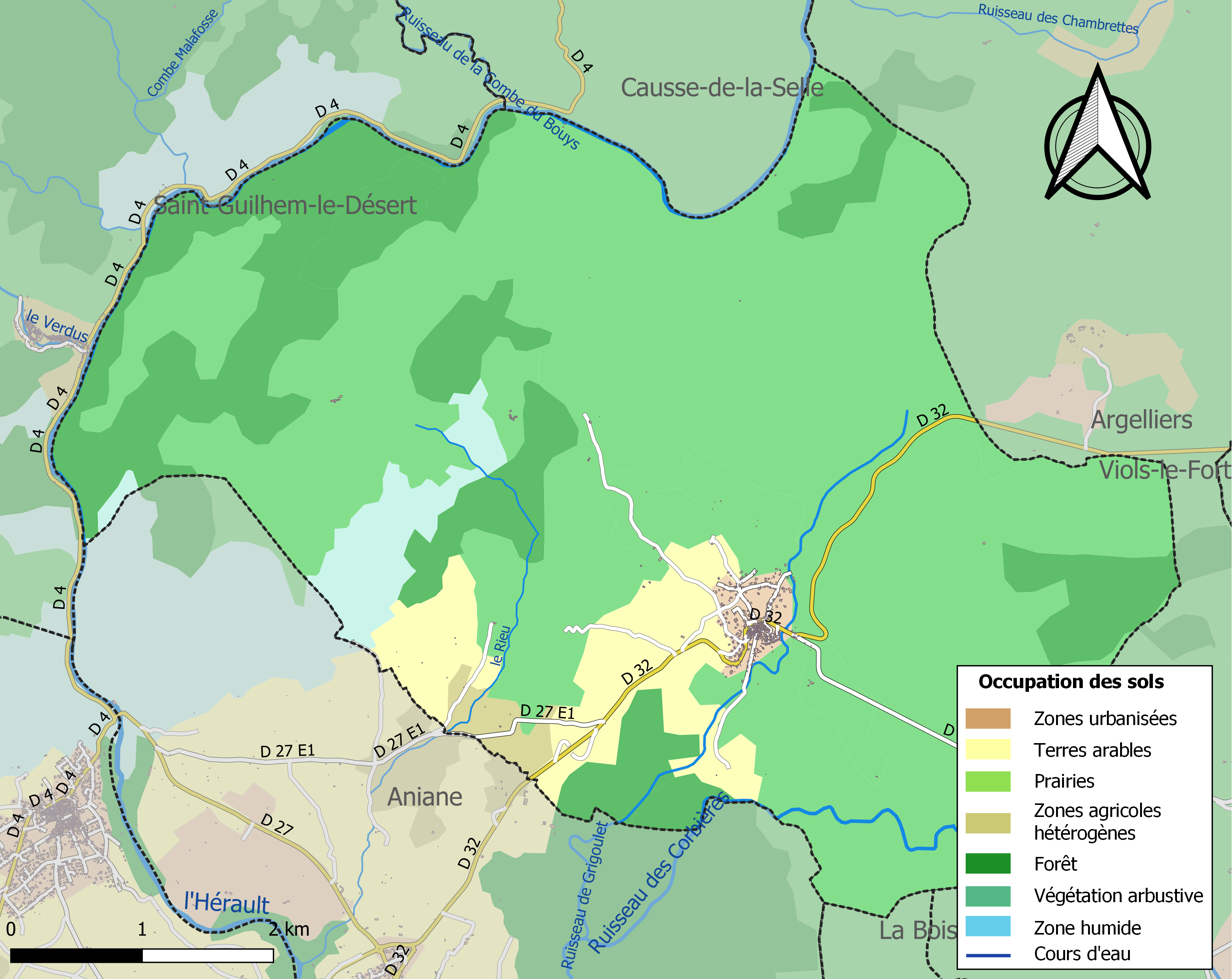
Map of Infrastructure and Land Use in the Commune in 2018 (CLC)

== Population ==
Historical population

Year	Pop.	±% p.a.
1793	647	—
1800	669	+0.48%
1806	741	+1.72%
1821	835	+0.80%
1831	901	+0.76%
1836	837	−1.46%
1841	872	+0.82%
1846	909	+0.83%
1851	893	−0.35%
1856	860	−0.75%
1861	862	+0.05%
1866	851	−0.26%
1872	792	−1.19%
1876	863	+2.17%
1881	826	−0.87%
1886	747	−1.99%
1891	647	−2.83%
1896	732	+2.50%
1901	651	−2.32%

Year	Pop.	±% p.a.
1906	588	−2.02%
1911	532	−1.98%
1921	515	−0.32%
1926	415	−4.23%
1931	378	−1.85%
1936	371	−0.37%
1946	315	−1.62%
1954	270	−1.91%
1962	239	−1.51%
1968	200	−2.93%
1975	221	+1.44%
1982	255	+2.07%
1990	273	+0.86%
1999	346	+2.67%
2007	445	+3.20%
2012	454	+0.40%
2017	485	+1.33%
2023	509	+0.81%

Source: Ldh/EHESS/Cassini until 1999, and INSEE since 2007.

== See also ==
- Communes of the Hérault department
