= Lucien Gasser =

French aviator

Lucien Marcel Gasser
- Born: 2 February 1897; Pompey, Meurthe-et-Moselle, France
- Died: 14 February 1939 (aged 42); Malzéville, France
- Military career
- Allegiance: France
- Branch: Artillery; aviation
- Rank: Adjutant
- Units: 8e Regiment d'Artillerie, Escadrille 87
- Awards: Légion d'honneur, Médaille militaire, Croix de Guerre with seven palmes and an étoile de vermeil, Mentioned in Dispatches five times

Adjutant Lucien Marcel Gasser (1897-1939) was a French flying ace during World War I. He was a double ace, credited with ten confirmed aerial victories.

== World War I ==
On 21 August 1914, Gasser volunteered for military service until war's end. As a soldat de 2e classe, he was posted to artillery service. On 7 March 1915, he was promoted to enlisted Brigadier; 10 February 1917 saw his further promotion to Maréchal-des-logis. On 25 May 1917, Gasser began pilot training at Dijon. Once awarded Military Pilot's Brevet No. 8126 on 22 August 1917, he polished his skills at advanced training before assignment to Escadrille 87 on 1 January 1918.

Gasser used a Spad to score his first victory on 16 February 1918. He scored four more times in March, becoming an ace on the 27th. On 23 April 1918, he was promoted to Adjutant. The Médaille militaire that was awarded Gasser on 16 June credited him with four wins; by that time, his tally had risen to seven. On 7 July, he scored his last victory. His record showed he single-handedly shot down six enemy airplanes, teamed with other French pilots to destroy three others, and downed a German observation balloon to become a balloon buster. Eight days later, 15 July 1918, he was wounded so severely in the left leg that amputation resulted. On 3 August, he was selected as a Chevalier in the Légion d'honneur.

== Postwar ==
Gasser rose to Commandeur in the Légion d'honneur. He was killed in a flying accident on 14 February 1939.

== Bibliography ==
- Over the Front: A Complete Record of the Fighter Aces and Units of the United States and French Air Services, 1914-1918 Norman L. R. Franks, Frank W. Bailey. Grub Street, 1992. ISBN 0-948817-54-2, ISBN 978-0-948817-54-0.
