= Maurice Boyau =

France international rugby union player & WW1 flying ace (1888–1918)

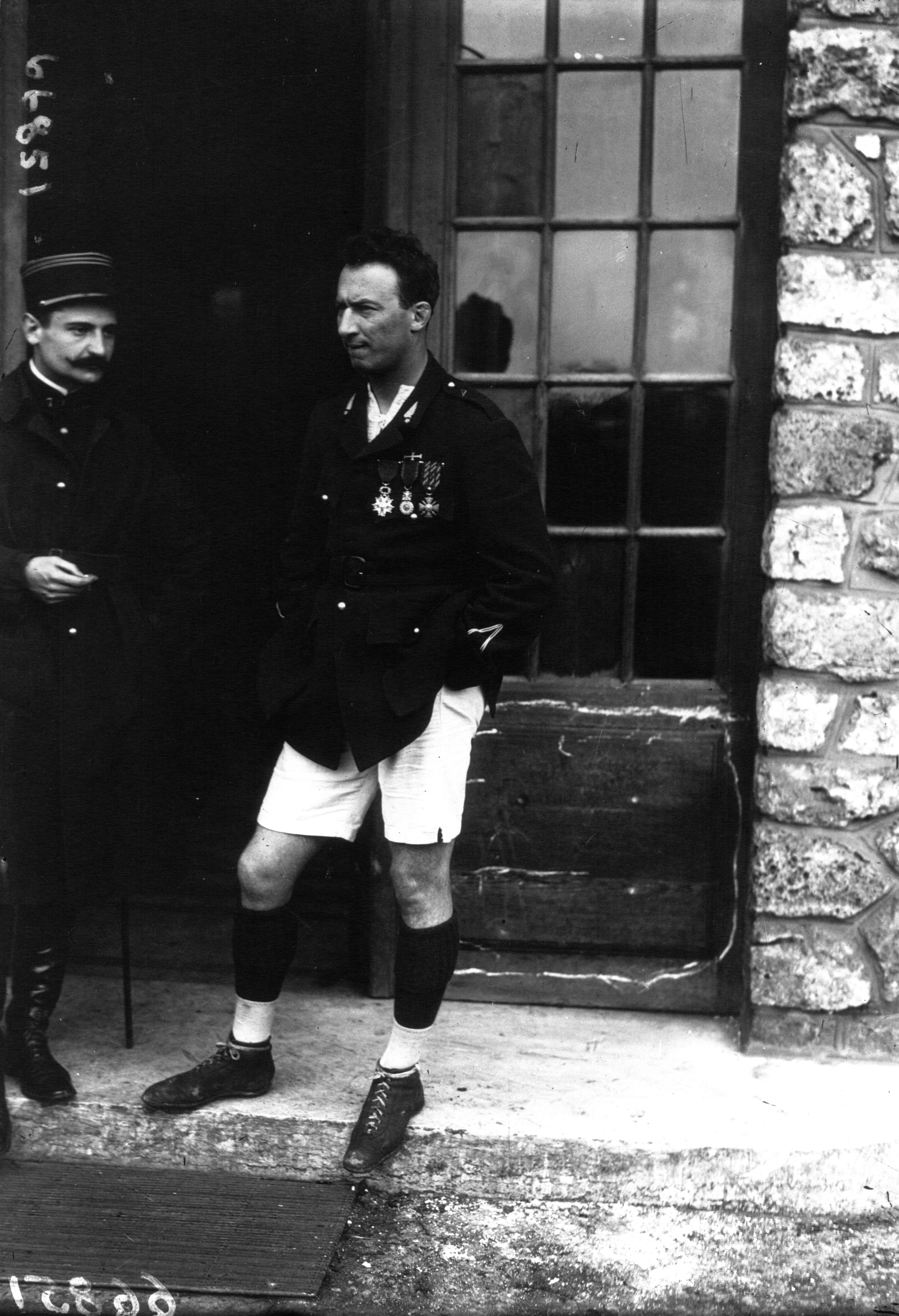
- Born: Maurice Jean-Paul Boyau; 8 May 1888; Mustapha, Algeria
- Died: 16 September 1918 (aged 30); Mars-la-Tour, France
- Military career
- Allegiance: France
- Branch: Army Service Corps, French Air Service
- Service years: 1914–1918
- Rank: Lieutenant
- Unit: N 77
- Conflicts: World War I
- Awards: Médaille militaire, Légion d'honneur
- Other work: Rugby union player

Maurice Jean-Paul Boyau (8 May 1888 – 16 September 1918) was a French rugby union player and a leading French ace of the First World War with 35 victories, and one of the most successful balloon busters.

Born in Mustapha, Algeria, on 8 May 1888, Boyau first served in the 144th Infantry Regiment before the war. Boyau was already known to the public when war began in 1914, having led the French rugby team. He served as an Army Service Corps driver for the first year or so of the conflict, then was accepted for pilot training.

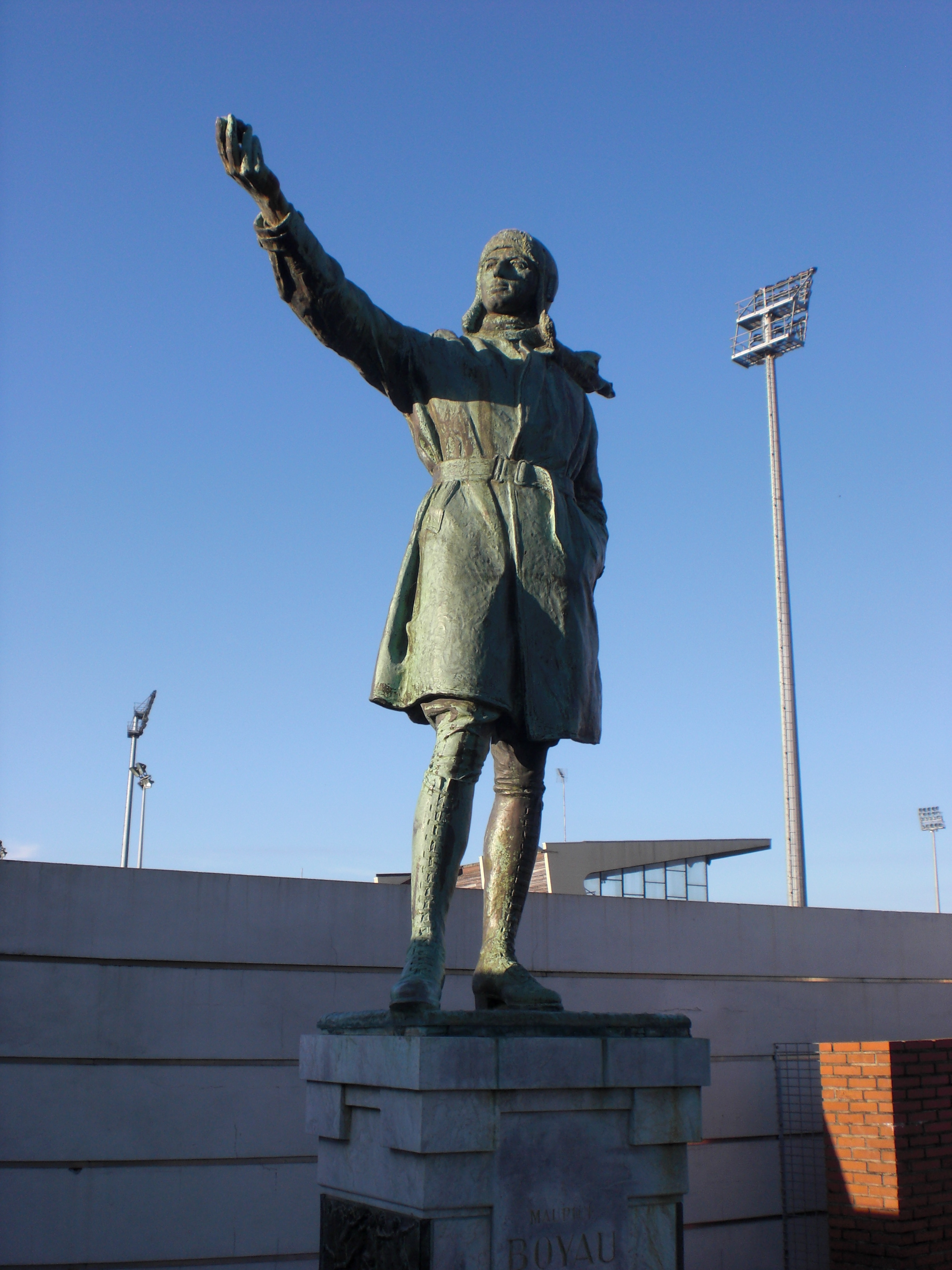
Maurice Boyau statue, outside the French stadium named after him.

== Biography ==
=== Sporting career ===
Passionate and endowed for all sports, he particularly practised rugby union at the highest level. He played as a winger or center with US Dax at first (whose stadium is currently named after him, and where a statue was erected in his honour, in 1924) then for Stade Bordelais and finally Racing Club de France during World War 1. He was also one of the most famous international players of his time. The day before the war, his honours included:

- 6 caps for the French national team, 4 in 1912 and 2 in 1913, captaining twice
- a French championship title in 1911 (the last final played by Stade Bordelais)

=== Flying service ===
He acquired his Pilot's Brevet on 28 November 1915. In late 1915, he was assigned as a flight instructor at Buc but arranged to join a combat unit as a Caporal in September 1916. He spent the rest of his career with Escadrille 77, known as "Les Sportifs" for the great number of athletes in its ranks. Boyau originally flew Nieuports with them. His Nieuport's paint scheme featured a rather flamboyant serpentine dragon writhing the length of a white fuselage.

As an enlisted pilot, Boyau was promoted to Sergeant. He scored his first ten victories between March and September 1917, including six balloons. During this spell, he shared the first of an eventual six balloon buster victories with fellow ace Gilbert Sardier. He was then commissioned and continued his exceptional record flying SPADs.

In the spring of 1918, Boyau began using air-to-air rockets, developed two years earlier. He had rocket tubes affixed to the inner set of interplane struts of his Spad XIII. He made his mark with repeated successes in the summer of 1918, scoring four victories in June; nine in July; and three in August. He burned his last four balloons in three days of September, but was killed by defending German fighters on the 16th, with Georg von Hantelmann receiving credit.

== Legacy ==
Boyau accounted for 21 balloons (14 shared) and 14 aircraft (4 shared), ranking fifth among all French aces of The Great War. He earned the Médaille militaire and Légion d'honneur for his aerial enterprises in 1917 and 1918.

A stadium of one of his former clubs, Dax, France, is named to commemorate him, the Stade Maurice Boyau.

== Military honors ==
=== Médaille militaire ===
"Pursuit pilot of audacious bravery. Three times cited in orders, and has to his credit an aircraft and a balloon. On 5 June 1917 he destroyed another balloon. Forced to land in enemy territory, he repaired his plane and flew back over the lines at 200 meters altitude, under fire of enemy machine guns."

=== Légion d'honneur ===
"Pilot of remarkable bravery whose marvelous physical qualities are put to use by his most arduous spirit and fights at great heights. Magnificent officer with an admirable spirit of self-sacrifice, facing each day with the same smiling desire for new exploits, surpassing then succeeding. He excels in all branches of aviation; reconnaissance, photography in single-seaters, bombardments at low altitudes, attacks on ground troops, and is classed among the best pursuit pilots. He has reported twenty-seven victories, the last twelve in less than one month. Has shot down sixteen balloons and eleven planes. Has the Médaille Militaire and Officier de la Légion d'Honneur for feats of war. Eleven citations."

== See also ==
- List of international rugby union players killed in action during the First World War
