= Causse-de-la-Selle =

- Commune
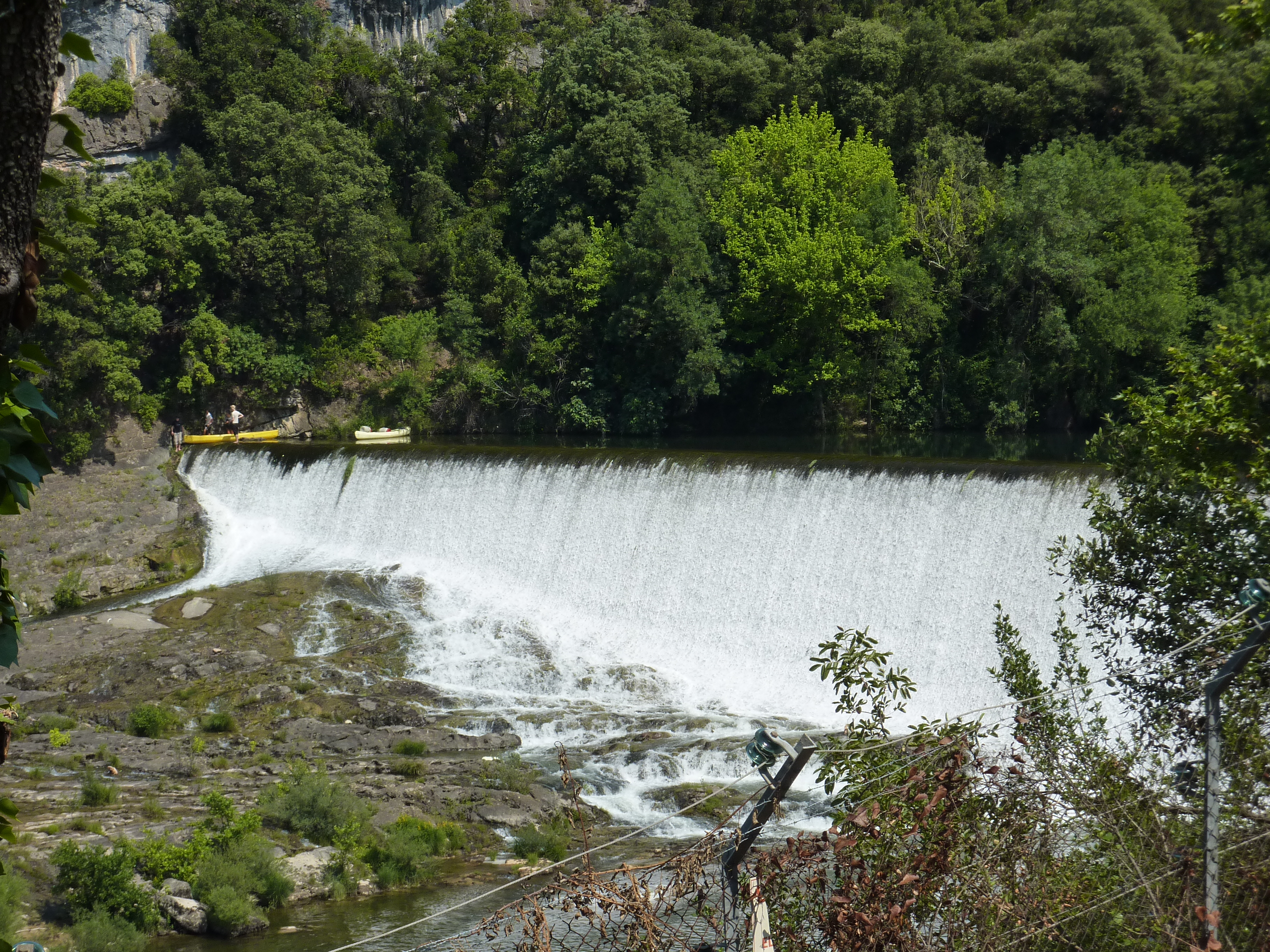
- Canoes crossing a spillway of the Herault between Saint-Martin-de-Londres and Causse-de-la-Selle.
- Location of Causse-de-la-Selle
- Location within France Location within Occitanie
- Coordinates: 43°48′23″N 3°38′53″E
- Country: France
- Region: Occitania
- Department: Hérault
- Arrondissement: Lodève
- Canton: Lodève

Government
  - Mayor (2025–2026): Eric Baljou
- Area^{1}: 45.19 km^{2} (17.45 sq mi)
- Elevation: 257 m (843 ft)
- Highest elevation: 640 m (2,100 ft)
- Lowest elevation: 68 m (223 ft)
- Population (2023): 454
  - Density: 10.0/km^{2} (26.0/sq mi)
- Time zone: UTC+01:00 (CET)
  - Summer (DST): UTC+02:00 (CEST)
- INSEE/Postal code: 34060 /34380
- ^{1} French Land Register data, which excludes lakes, ponds, glaciers > 1 km^{2} (0.386 sq mi or 247 acres) and river estuaries.

Causse-de-la-Selle (French pronunciation: [kos də la sɛl]; Occitan: Lo Causse de la Cèla) is a commune in the Hérault department in southern France.

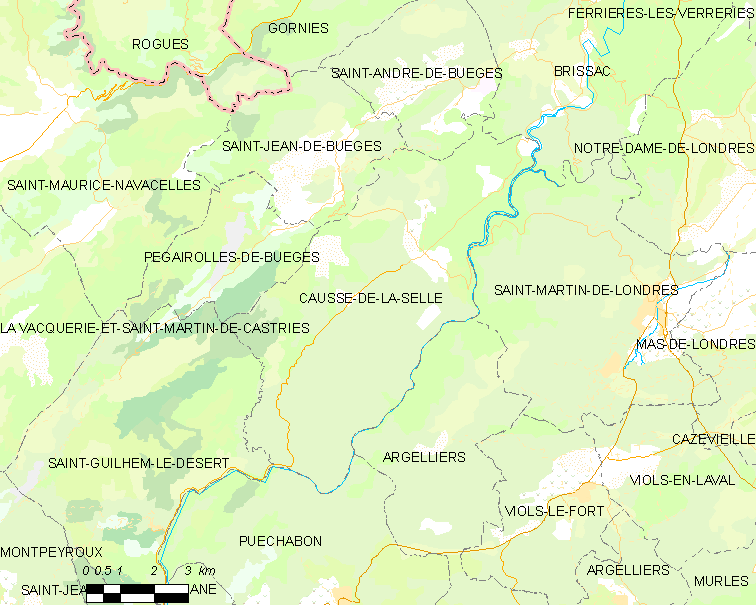
Map

== Population ==
Historical population
Year	Pop.	±% p.a.
1968	169	—
1975	188	+1.53%
1982	171	−1.34%
1990	194	+1.59%
1999	291	+4.61%
2007	324	+1.35%
2012	347	+1.38%
2017	392	+2.47%
2023	454	+2.48%
Source: INSEE

== See also ==
- Communes of the Hérault department
