= Escadrille Spa.90 =

Escadrille N.90 / SPA.90
- Active: 1917–1918
- Country: France
- Branch: French Air Service
- Type: Fighter Squadron
- Battle honours: Cited in orders

Escadrille Spa.90 (originally named Escadrille N.90) was a French fighter squadron that served in World War I from early 1917 until war's end. They were credited with destroying 13 German airplanes and 22 observation balloons.

== History ==
Escadrille Spa.90 began by combining two existing formations, N504 and N507, in early 1917. It was founded as an integral fighter squadron to VIII Armee, and was initially dubbed Escadrille N.90 because Nieuport fighters were its predominant aircraft.

On 22 April 1918, the squadron was renamed Escadrille Spa.90 when it re-equipped with SPAD fighters. On 9 November 1918, the unit was Cited in orders for having destroyed 10 German airplanes and 14 observation balloons. However, its total victory score for the war was 13 airplanes and 22 balloons.

== Commanding officers ==
- Lieutenant Pierre Weiss: Early 1917 - 4 November 1918

== Notable members ==
- Lieutenant colonel Marius Ambrogi
- Lieutenant colonel Jean André Pezon
- Adjutant Charles J. V. Macé
- Adjutant Maurice Bizot

== Aircraft ==
- Three Nieuport XXIVs: 3 March 1917
- Two Nieuport XXIV bis: 3 March 1917
- Seven Nieuport XXVII: 3 March 1917
- Three SPAD XIs: 3 March 1917
- SPADs: 22 April 1918
