= Treffieux =

- Commune
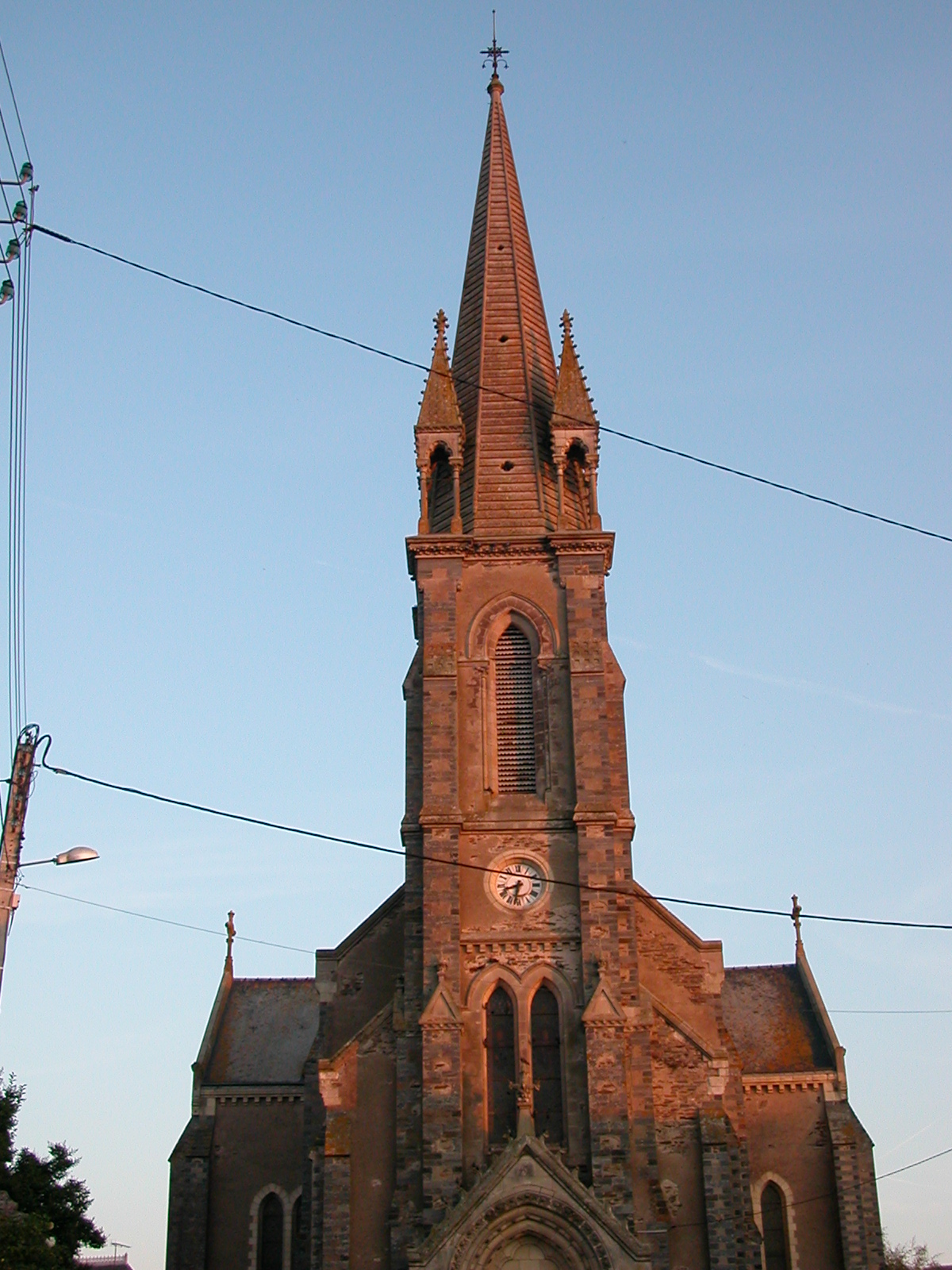
- The church in Treffieux

- Coat of arms
- Location of Treffieux
- Location within France Location within Pays de la Loire
- Coordinates: 47°37′14″N 1°32′11″W
- Country: France
- Region: Pays de la Loire
- Department: Loire-Atlantique
- Arrondissement: Châteaubriant-Ancenis
- Canton: Guémené-Penfao
- Intercommunality: CC de Nozay

Government
  - Mayor (2020–2026): Didier Bruhay
- Area^{1}: 19.12 km^{2} (7.38 sq mi)
- Highest elevation: 54 m (177 ft)
- Lowest elevation: 19 m (62 ft)
- Population (2023): 996
  - Density: 52.1/km^{2} (135/sq mi)
- Demonym(s): Treffiolaises, Treffiolais
- Time zone: UTC+01:00 (CET)
  - Summer (DST): UTC+02:00 (CEST)
- INSEE/Postal code: 44208 /44170
- Website: http://www.treffieux.fr/
- ^{1} French Land Register data, which excludes lakes, ponds, glaciers > 1 km^{2} (0.386 sq mi or 247 acres) and river estuaries.

Treffieux (French pronunciation: [tʁefjø]; Breton: Trefieg) is a commune in the Loire-Atlantique department in western France.

== See also ==
- Communes of the Loire-Atlantique department
