= François Guerrier =

French aviator in World War I

Francis Henri Marie Guerrier
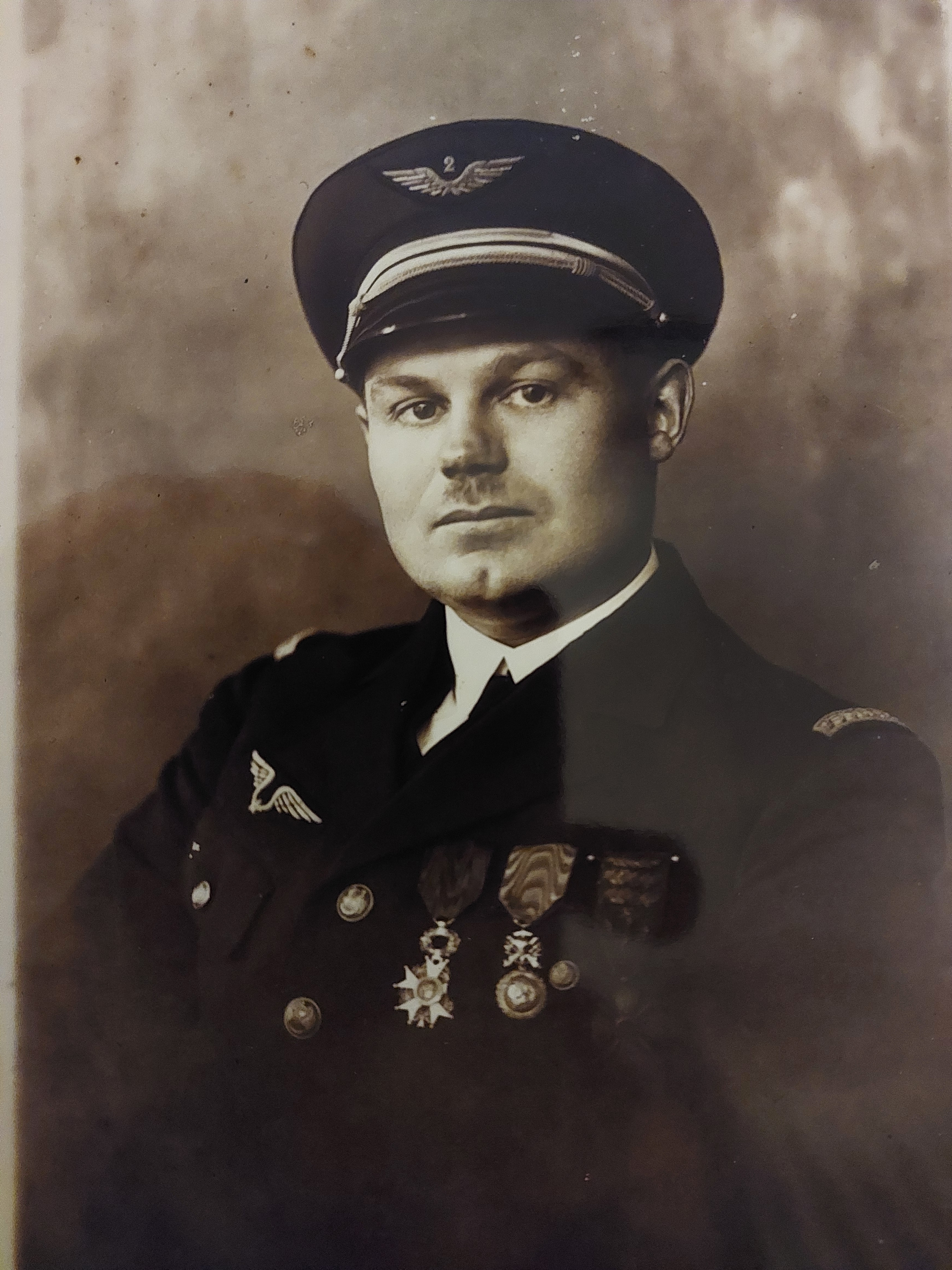
- Born: March 2, 1896; Treffieux, France
- Died: June 28, 1969 (aged 73)
- Burial place: Treffieux, France
- Military career
- Allegiance: France
- Branch: Infantry, then flying service
- Rank: Adjutant
- Nickname: Le Bulldog
- Unit: Sop234, Spa77
- Awards: Legion d'honneur, Médaille militaire, Croix de Guerre

Adjutant Francis Guerrier (1896-1969) was a French World War I flying ace and balloon buster credited with five aerial victories over enemy observation balloons.

== Biography ==
Guerrier was born in Treffieux, France. During World War I, he served with an infantry regiment. He won a Croix de Guerre with bronze star on 27 April 1917. Subsequently, he was transferred to aviation duty. Beginning 16 May 1918, he began scoring victories over enemy observation balloons. By war's end, he had succeeded in downing, singly or with others, five of the enemy craft despite the extreme hazards involved.

He not only won the Croix de Guerre with three palmes, an etoile de vermeil, and three etoiles de bronze, but also appointment to the Légion d'honneur as a chevalier. Additionally, he won the Médaille Militaire on 15 October 1918, just before war's end.

Médaille Militaire citation:
"Non-commissioned officer who came from the infantry where he had proved his qualities as a fighter. Transferred to aviation, he immediately became an excellent pursuit pilot, never ceasing to demonstrate his courage by example, searching out the enemy with untiring energy. A remarkable patrol leader, model of tenacity, devotion and courage. Downed several times by the enemy, his aircraft riddled by bullets, he returned to the most difficult of combats with the same spirit and morale. On 3 September 1918, he reported his 4th victory by downing a balloon in flames. Five citations."
