= Saint-Germain-du-Bel-Air =

Saint-Germain-du-Bel-Air Sent Girman (Occitan)
- Commune
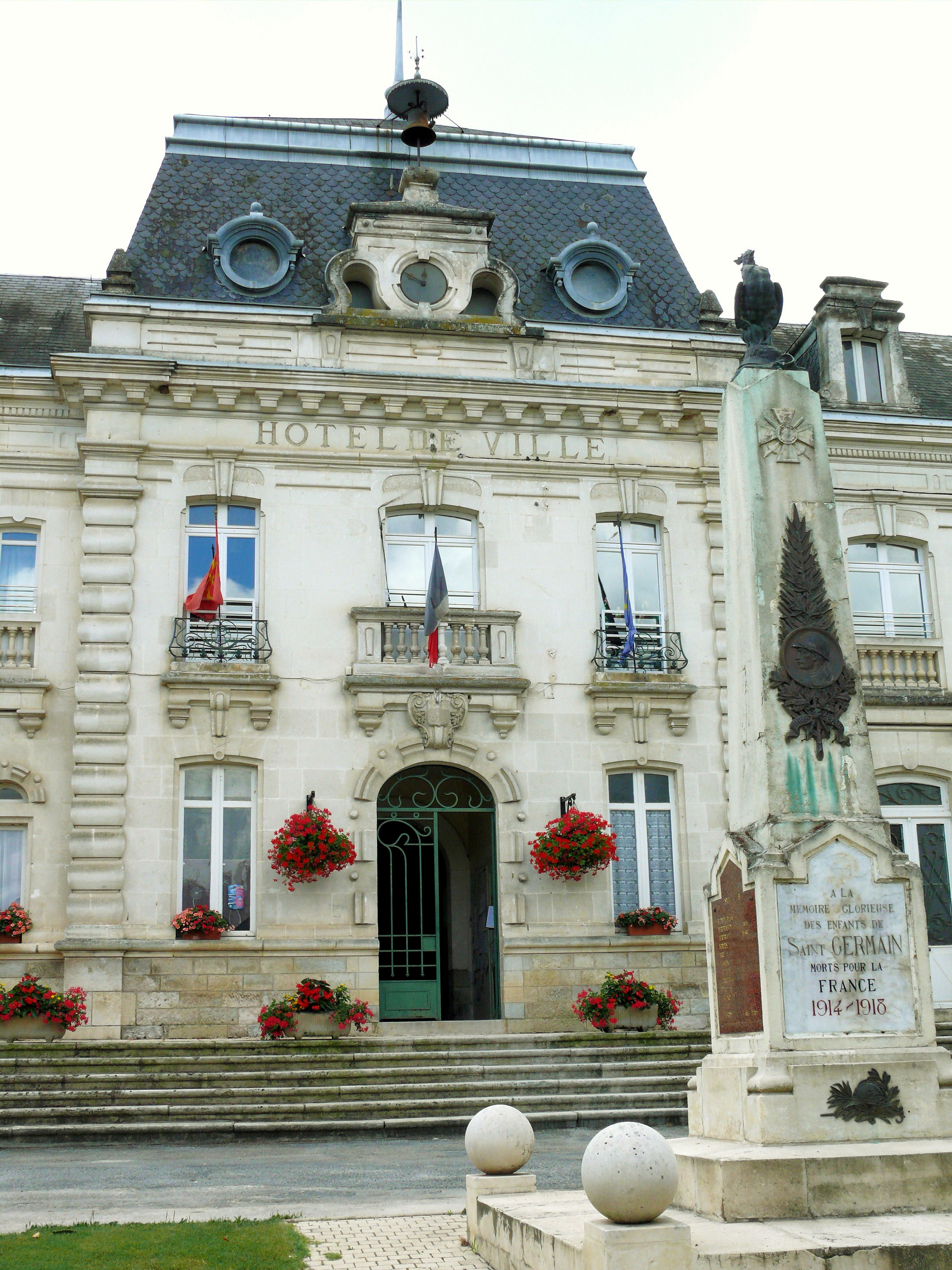
- The town hall and war memorial

- Coat of arms
- Location of Saint-Germain-du-Bel-Air
- Location within France Location within Occitanie
- Coordinates: 44°38′52″N 1°26′26″E
- Country: France
- Region: Occitania
- Department: Lot
- Arrondissement: Gourdon
- Canton: Causse et Bouriane
- Intercommunality: Quercy-Bouriane

Government
  - Mayor (2020–2026): Patrick Labrande
- Area^{1}: 21.47 km^{2} (8.29 sq mi)
- Elevation: 250 m (820 ft)
- Highest elevation: 394 m (1,293 ft)
- Lowest elevation: 188 m (617 ft)
- Population (2023): 624
  - Density: 29.1/km^{2} (75.3/sq mi)
- Time zone: UTC+01:00 (CET)
  - Summer (DST): UTC+02:00 (CEST)
- INSEE/Postal code: 46267 /46310
- ^{1} French Land Register data, which excludes lakes, ponds, glaciers > 1 km^{2} (0.386 sq mi or 247 acres) and river estuaries.

Saint-Germain-du-Bel-Air (French: [sɛ̃ ʒɛʁmɛ̃ dy bɛl ɛːʁ]; Occitan: Sent Girman) is a commune in the Lot department in south-western France.

== Geography ==
The village lies in the middle of the commune, on the left bank of the Céou, which flows westward through the commune.

== See also ==
- Communes of the Lot department
