= Nieuport 27 =

French WW1 fighter aircraft

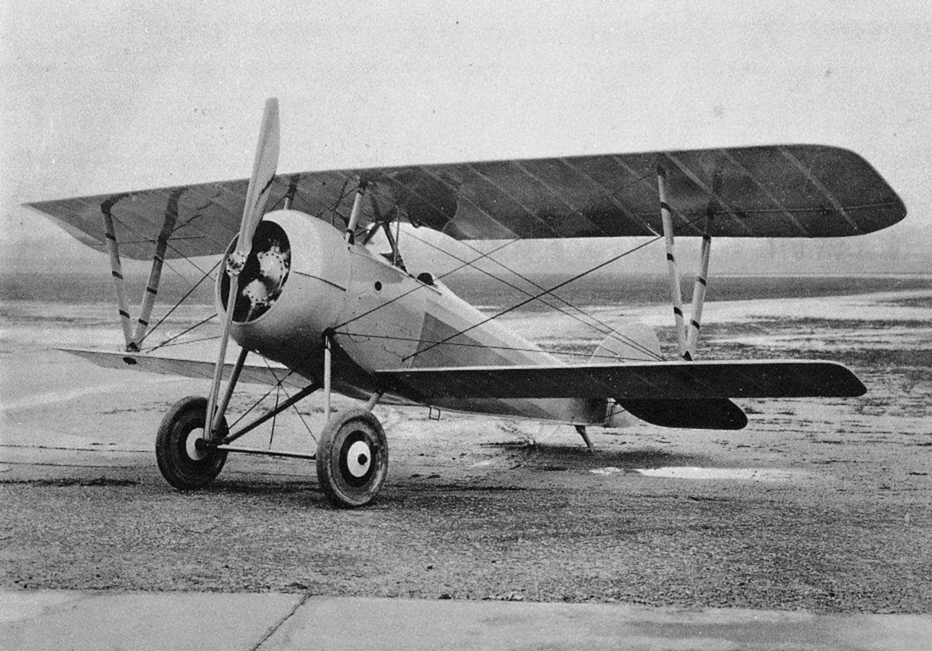
- USAAS Nieuport 27 advanced trainer

General information
- Type: fighter / advanced trainer
- National origin: France
- Manufacturer: Nieuport, Nakajima, Uruguayan Air Force
- Designer: Gustave Delage
- Primary users: Aéronautique Militaire Corpo Aeronautico Militare; Royal Flying Corps
- Number built: approx 1,000

History
- Introduction date: October 1917
- First flight: 1917
- Retired: 1931 (Uruguay)
- Developed from: Nieuport 24

The Nieuport 27 (or Nieuport XXVII C.1 in contemporary sources) was a World War I French sesquiplane fighter aircraft designed by Gustave Delage. The 27 was the last of the line of Nieuport "V-strut" single seat fighters that began with the Nieuport 10 of 1914. Operational examples supplemented the very similar Nieuport 24 and 24bis in operational squadrons in late 1917 and many would also be used as advanced trainers.

== Design and development ==
The Nieuport 27's design closely followed that of the 24, sharing the same faired fuselage, rounded ailerons and half-heart shaped rudder. The only externally visible changes from the 24 included the replacement of the fixed external wood Nieuport type sprung tailskid with an internally pivoted type, and the replacement of the single undercarriage axle that connected both wheels, with one that had a hinge along the centerline – and one extra wire. By 1918, many Nieuport fighters were being used as advanced trainers, and the 130 hp (97 kW) Le Rhône 9JB Rotary engine was often replaced by lower powered engines, such as the 80 hp (60 kW) Le Rhône 9C.

Operational Nieuport 27s in Italian and French service were armed with a synchronized, fuselage-mounted .303 in (7.70 mm) Vickers machine gun occasionally supplemented with an overwing Lewis Gun mounted on one of several mountings. In British service with the Royal Flying Corps and later the Royal Air Force a .303 in (7.70 mm) Lewis Gun was mounted on a Foster mounting above the top wing.

Nieuport produced a number of prototypes either contemporary to, or based on the Nieuport 27, including one with a 150 hp (110 kW) Hispano-Suiza 8 V-8 inline engine that may have been designated the Nieuport 26, another with an enlarged 2 spar lower wing and a third with a redesigned front fuselage with a further simplified cabane structure, and a Vickers mounted on the forward port longeron. Development of the Nieuport 28, with ailerons moved to the two spar lower wing, rounded wingtips and a simplified fuselage structure, concluded further development of the 27 line.

== Operational history ==
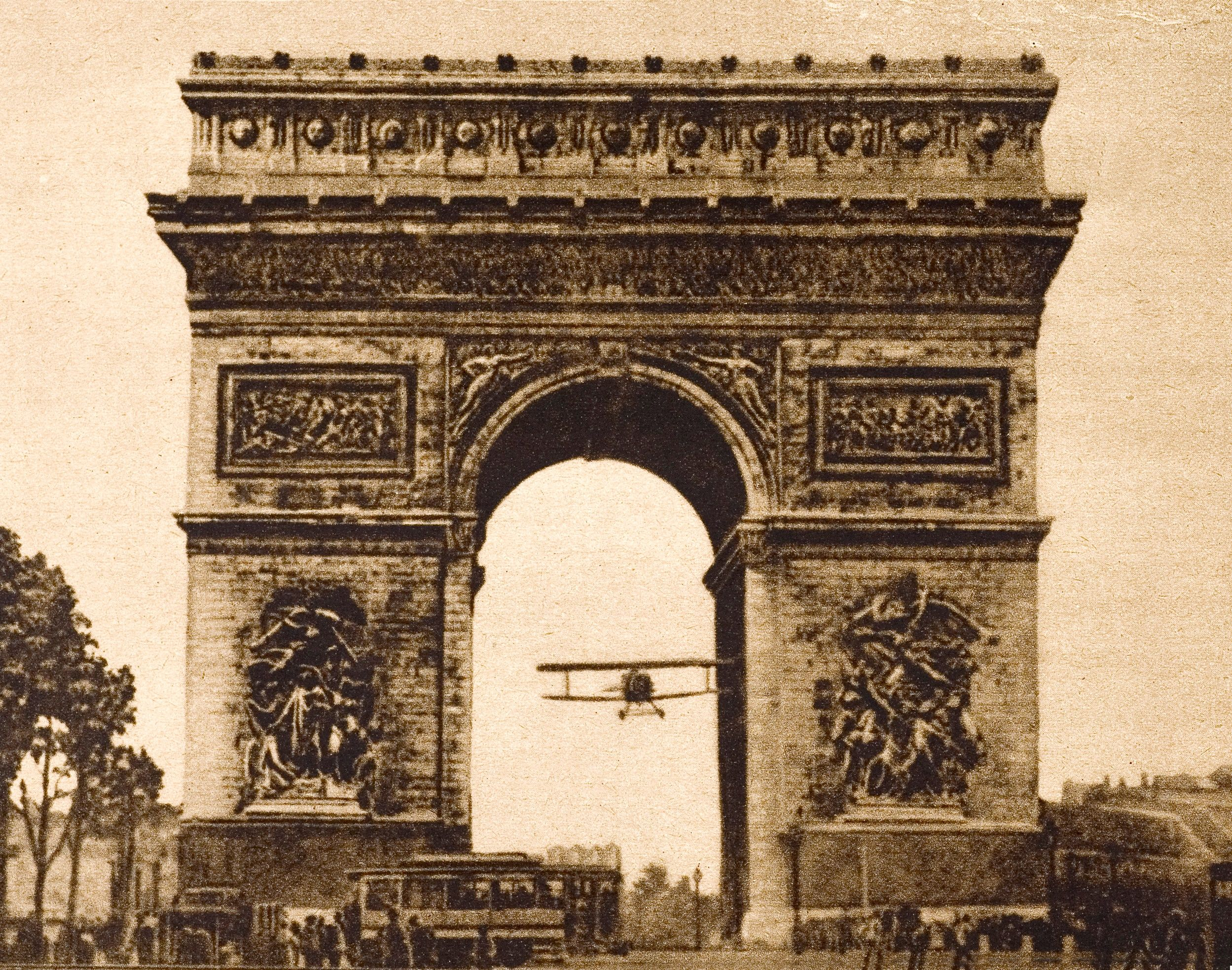
Godefroy passing through the Arc de Triomphe.

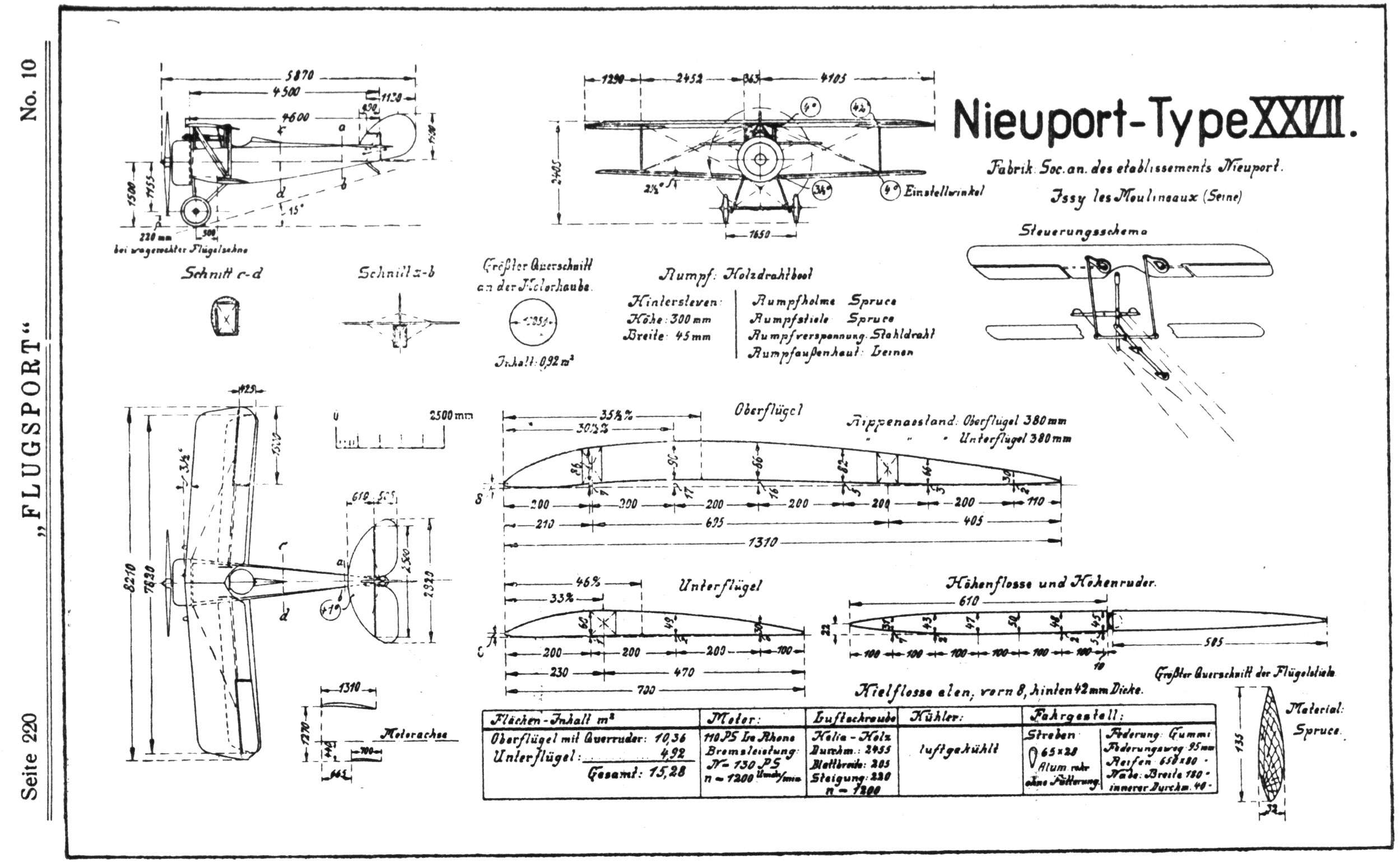
Nieuport 27 drawing

Despite being obsolescent before entering service, the type served with a large number of French Aéronautique Militaire units, pending availability of the newer SPAD S.XIII.

In protest of the humiliation of airmen being ordered to march rather than fly for the main French victory parade on the Champs Élysées to celebrate the end of the First World War, Charles Godefroy flew a Nieuport 27 through the 14.50 m (47.6 ft) gap between the pillars of the Arc de Triomphe, three weeks after the official victory parade, on 7 August 1919, an act which was widely reported in contemporary newspapers.

All Italian Nieuport 27s were imported from France. About 200 Nieuport 27s were supplied to Italy as Nieuport-Macchi was already at capacity producing the Hanriot HD.1 under licence.

The British Royal Flying Corps obtained 71 Nieuport 27s in 1917, supplementing or replacing earlier Nieuports. These were used until early 1918 when Royal Aircraft Factory S.E.5As became available in sufficient numbers, with the final operational examples being used in Palestine, while others were used in secondary roles, in the UK for training and trials.

In 1918 the United States Army Air Service placed orders for 461 Nieuport 27 E.Is for use as advanced fighter-trainers, of which 287 were delivered.

The Japanese bought several pattern aircraft and from 1921 to 1923 built 102 aircraft, with production starting by the Army Supply Depot at Tokorozawa until taken over by the Nakajima Aircraft Company. These were later designated as the 甲 3 (Ko 3), however the Japanese did not distinguish between the 24 and the 27.

The Uruguayan Air Service (Escuela Militar de Aviación (EMA)) purchased 6 surplus Nieuport 27s from France before EMA built an additional 18 unlicensed copies. In 1930 these were redesignated as AIME 10 (Avión de Instrucción Modelo Escuela – Training aircraft school model 10). The last of these were only retired in 1931.

After being retired from military service, a number of Nieuport 27s found their way onto the civil aircraft registers, particularly in France and Japan.

== Operators ==
Kingdom of Bulgaria

- Bulgarian Air Force – One captured Nieuport 27, formerly N5346

France

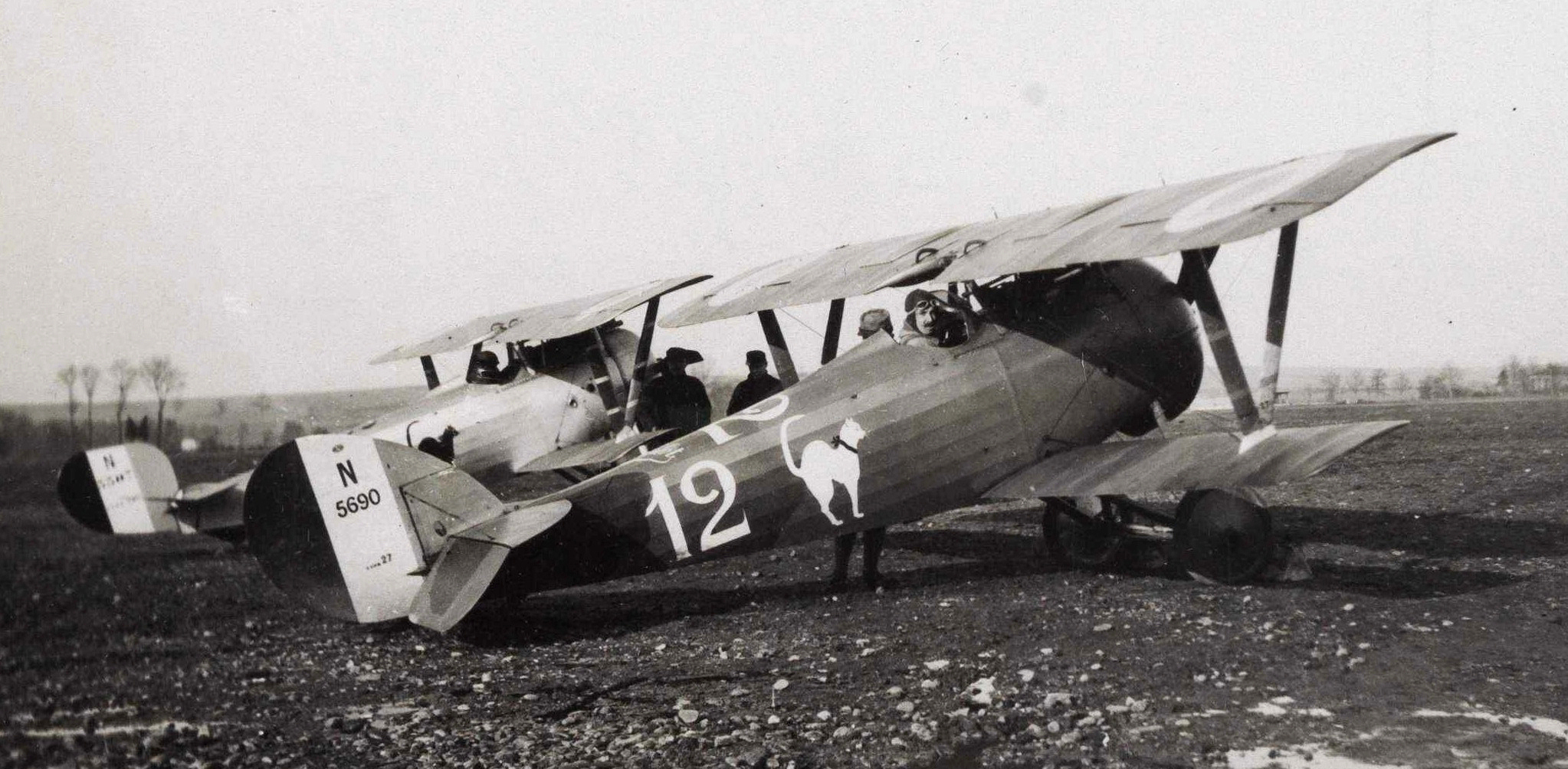
Pilot of Escadrille N 87 Nieuport 27 preparing to depart, with a Nieuport 24bis in the background

- Aéronautique Militaire
  - Army Cooperation
    - Escadrille N12
    - Escadrille N76
    - Escadrille N79
    - Escadrille N82
    - Escadrille N87
    - Escadrille N88
    - Escadrille N90
    - Escadrille N91
    - Escadrille N92
    - Escadrille N94
    - Escadrille N95
    - Escadrille N96
    - Escadrille N97
    - Escadrille N98
    - Escadrille N99
    - Escadrille N102
    - Escadrille N151
    - Escadrille N152
    - Escadrille N155
    - Escadrille N156
    - Escadrille N157
    - Escadrille N158
    - Escadrille N159
    - Escadrille N160
    - Escadrille N161
    - Escadrille N162
    - Escadrille N313
    - Escadrille N314
    - Escadrille N315
    - Escadrille N392
    - Escadrille N523
    - Escadrille N531
    - Escadrille N562
    - Escadrille N581
  - Group de Combat 11
    - Escadrille N57
  - Group de Combat 14
    - Escadrille N86
  - Group de Combat 17
    - Escadrille N89
    - Escadrille N91
    - Escadrille N100
  - Group de Combat 20
    - Escadrille N68
    - Escadrille N99
    - Escadrille N159
    - Escadrille N162
  - Group de Combat 21
    - Escadrille N98
    - Escadrille N157

Kingdom of Greece

- Hellenic Air Force

Kingdom of Italy

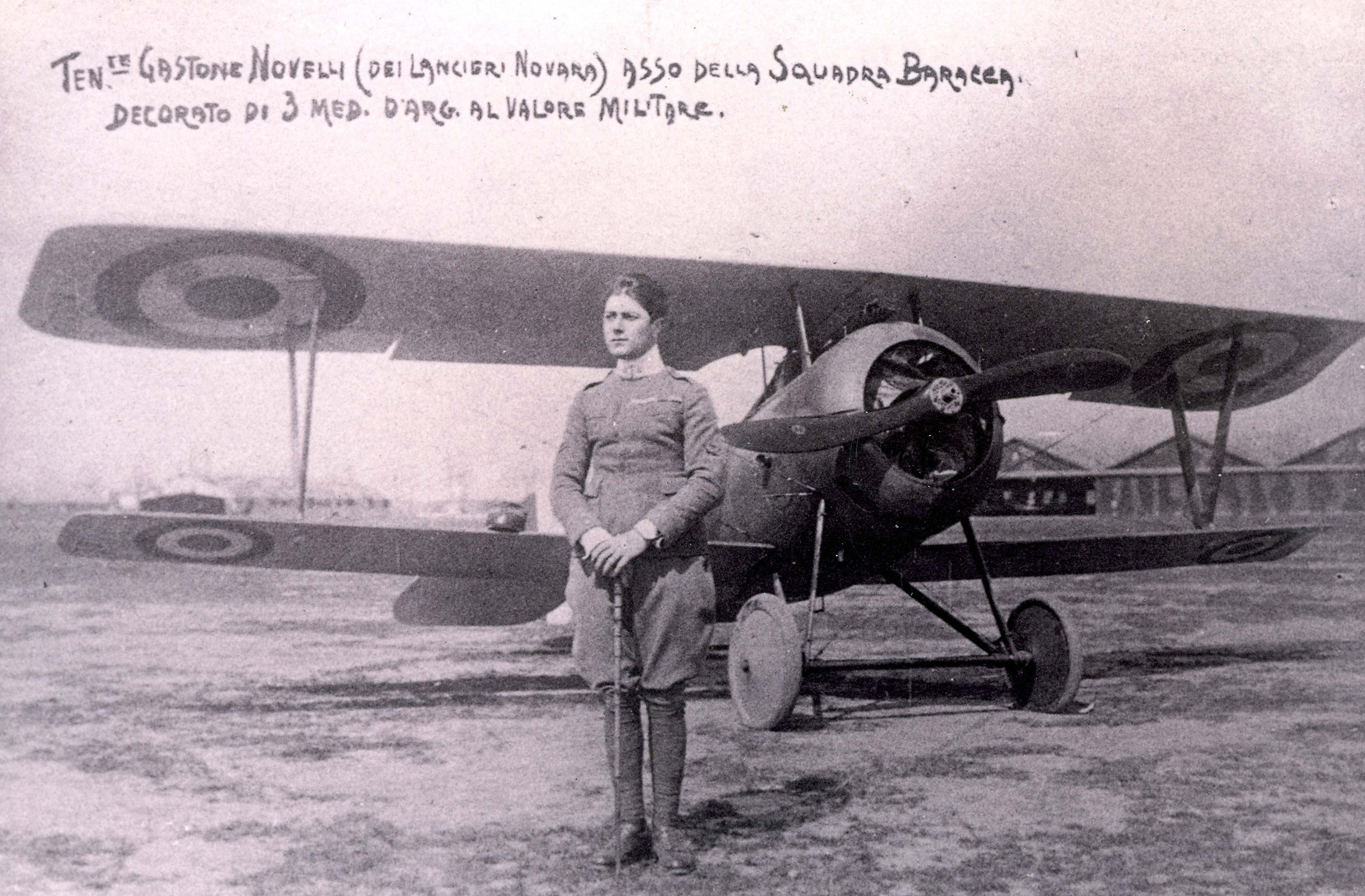
Italian Corpo Aeronautico Militare Nieuport 27

- Corpo Aeronautico Militare
  - 72a Squadriglia
  - 73a Squadriglia
  - 74a Squadriglia
  - 75a Squadriglia
  - 79a Squadriglia
  - 81a Squadriglia
  - 83a Squadriglia
  - 91a Squadriglia
  - 108a Squadriglia
  - 5a Sezione Difesa di Padova

Empire of Japan

- Imperial Japanese Army Air Service – 102 built under licence by Nakajima as the Ko 3.

Russian Empire / Soviet Union

- Imperial Russian Air Service
- Soviet Air Force – Taken over from the Imperial Russian Air Force.

Kingdom of Serbia

- Aéronautique Serbe operated 3 Nieuport 27s.

(Thailand) Siam

- Royal Siamese Aeronautical Service

Turkey

- Turkish Air Force – operated one captured Greek aircraft, named Ganimet 4 (war booty 4), and they may have captured a second example.

United Kingdom

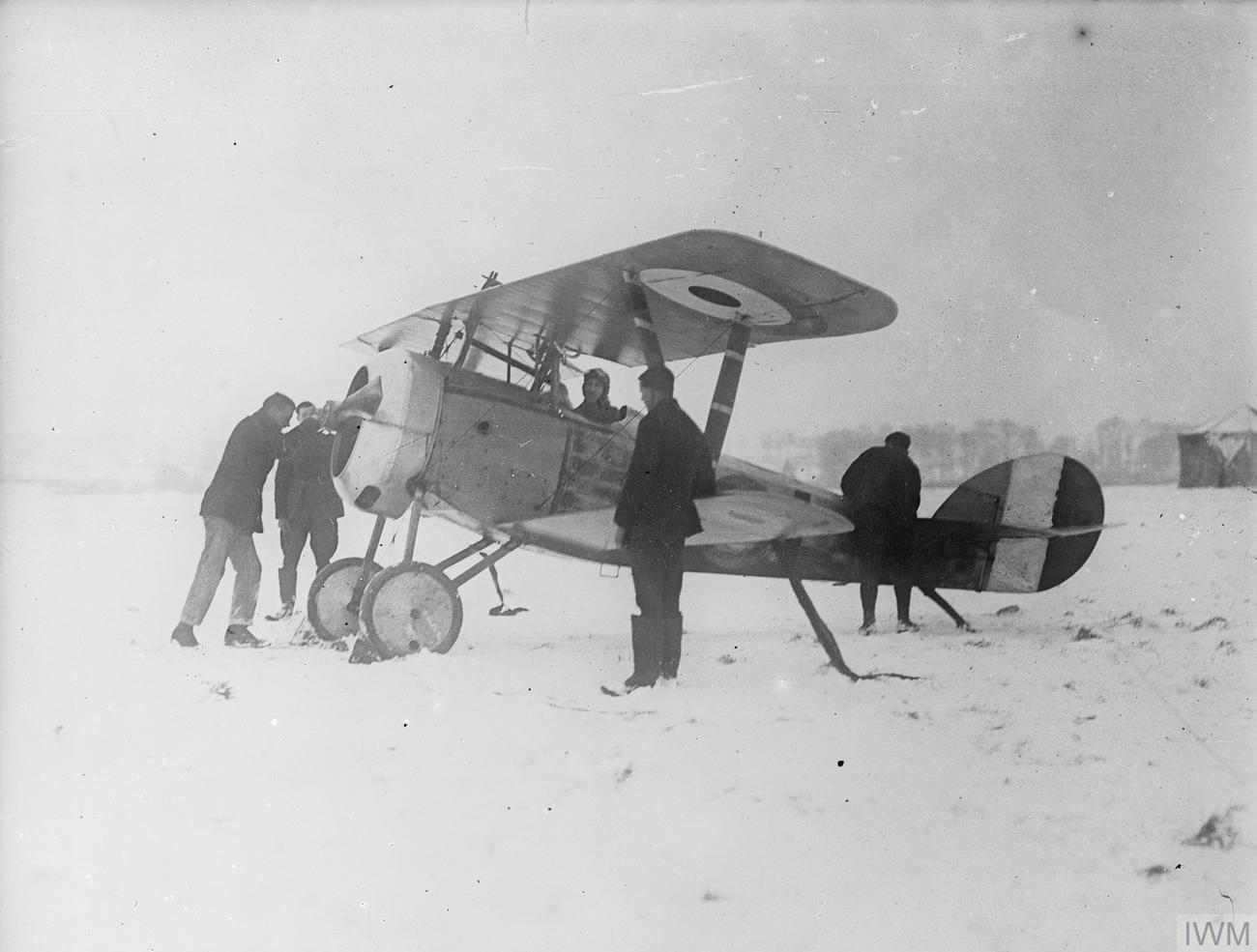
Royal Flying Corps Nieuport 27

- Royal Flying Corps

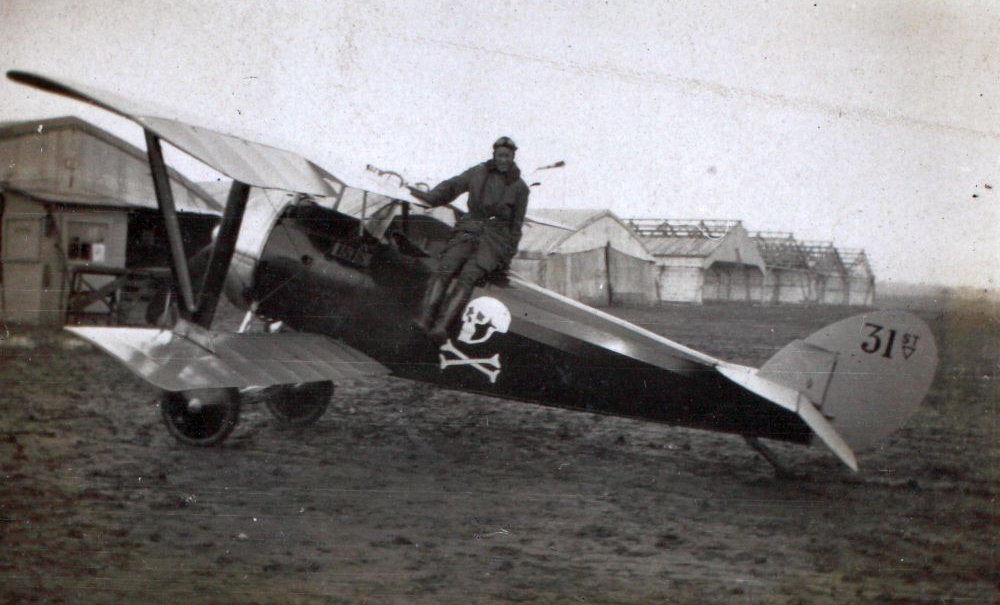
Nieuport 27 trainer of the American Expeditionary Force's 31st Aero squadron.

  - No. 1 Squadron RFC
  - No. 14 Squadron RFC
  - No. 17 Squadron RFC
  - No. 29 Squadron RFC
  - No. 40 Squadron RFC
  - No. 60 Squadron RFC
  - No. 67 Squadron RFC
  - No. 111 Squadron RFC
  - No. 113 Squadron RFC
- Royal Air Force
  - No. 22 Squadron RAF
  - No. 29 Squadron RAF

United States

- United States Army Air Service
- American Expeditionary Force
  - 31st Aero Squadron
  - 37th Aero Squadron

Uruguay

- Uruguayan Air Force operated 24 examples until 1931.

== Specifications ==
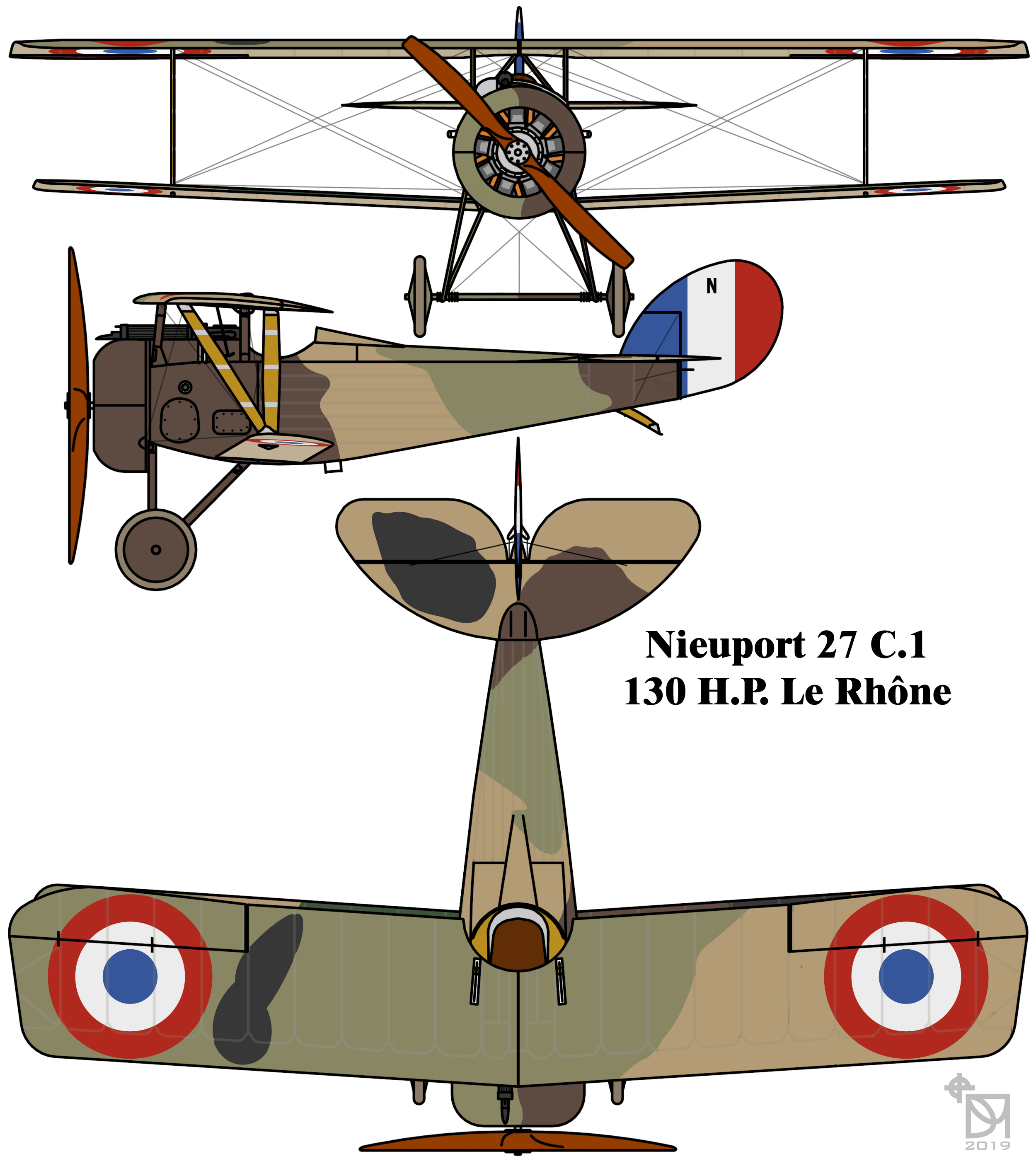
Camouflaged Nieuport 27 C.1 in French markings

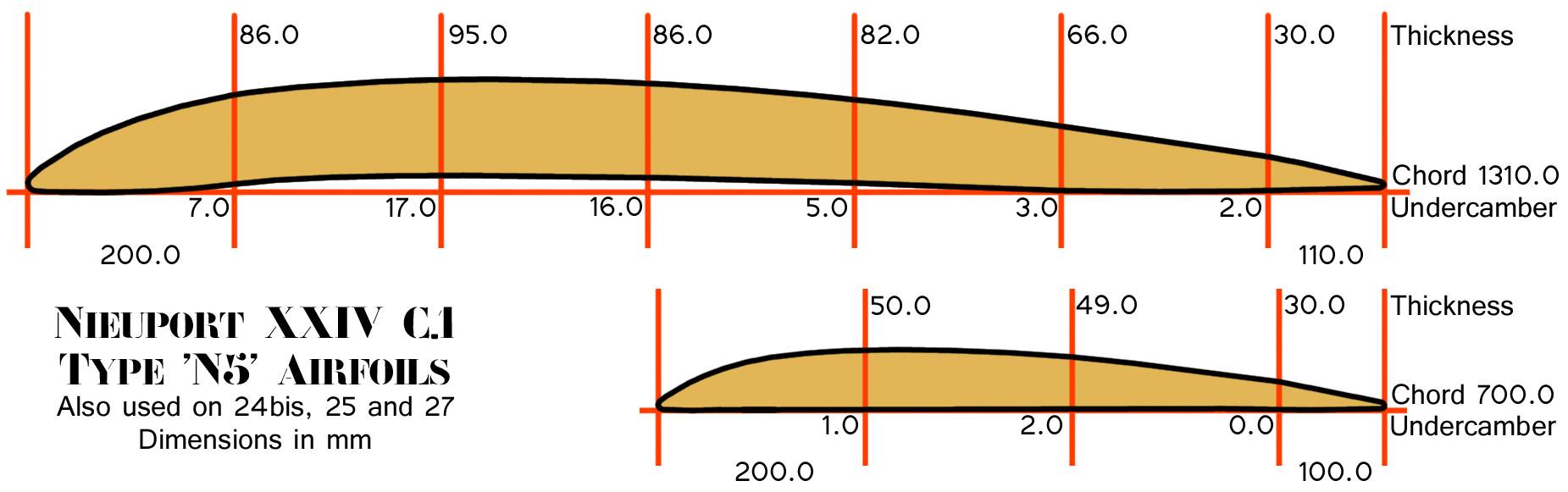
Nieuport Type N5 airfoil drawings

Data from Davilla, Dr. James J.; Soltan, Arthur (1997). French Aircraft of the First World War. Mountain View, CA: Flying Machines Press. p. 404. ISBN 978-1891268090.

General characteristics

- Crew: 1
- Length: 5.87 m (19 ft 3 in)
- Wingspan: 8.21 m (26 ft 11 in)
- Upper wingspan: 8.21 m (26 ft 11 in)
- Upper wing chord: 1.310 m (4 ft 3.6 in)
- Wing sweep: 3° 20'
- Lower wingspan: 7.80 m (25 ft 7 in)
- Lower wing chord: 0.705 m (2 ft 3.8 in)
- Height: 2.40 m (7 ft 10 in)
- Wing area: 14.75 m^{2} (158.8 sq ft)
- Airfoil: Type N-5
- Empty weight: 380 kg (838 lb)
- Gross weight: 535 kg (1,179 lb)
- Powerplant: 1 × Le Rhône 9JB 9 cylinder rotary engine, 97 kW (130 hp)
- Propellers: 2-bladed Levasseur 549, Régy 251 or Chauviére 2228 wooden fixed pitch propellers, 2.40 m (7 ft 10 in) diameter

Performance

- Maximum speed: 172 km/h (107 mph, 93 kn) at sea level
  - 170 km/h (110 mph; 92 kn) at 2,000 m (6,600 ft)
  - 167 km/h (104 mph; 90 kn) at 3,000 m (9,800 ft)
  - 165.7 km/h (103.0 mph; 89.5 kn) at 4,000 m (13,000 ft)
- Range: 250 km (160 mi, 130 nmi)
- Endurance: 2.25 hours
- Service ceiling: 6,850 m (22,470 ft)
- Time to altitude:
  - 5 minutes 40 seconds to 2,000 m (6,600 ft)
  - 9 minutes 25 seconds to 3,000 m (9,800 ft)
  - 14 minutes 40 seconds to 4,000 m (13,000 ft)
  - 21 minutes 30 seconds to 5,000 m (16,000 ft)

Armament

- Guns: one 1 × synchronised 0.303 in (7.70 mm) Vickers machine gun (except on RFC examples), and one 0.303 in (7.70 mm) Lewis optionally mounted above the top wing.
