= Antonio Reali =

Italian flying ace

- Born: 31 March 1891; Ozegna, Kingdom of Italy
- Died: 19 January 1975 (aged 83); Fano, Italy
- Military career
- Allegiance: Italy
- Branch: Engineer; aviation
- Rank: Capitano
- Unit: 79a Squadriglia
- Awards: Silver award of Medal for Military Valor
- Other work: Capitano in Reserves by 1940

Capitano Antonio Reali was an Italian World War I flying ace credited with eleven confirmed aerial victories, and 22 unconfirmed victories. He served in the Regia Aeronautica Reserves from 1923 to about 1940.

== Early life and service ==
Antonio Reali was born on 31 March 1891 in Ozegna, the Kingdom of Italy. Reali was called to the colors as a Private in the Engineers. He then transferred to the Corpo Aeronautico Militare.

== World War I aerial service ==
Reali went to aviation training at Coltano; there he earned a Maurice Farman 12 rating on 1 July 1916. He was granted an advanced pilot's license on 14 July, and qualified on a Farman 15 on 15 August 1916. After forwarding to Cascina Costa, he underwent Nieuport fighter training. He was assigned to a fighter squadron, 79a Squadriglia, on 20 January 1917. He submitted a victory claim as early as 3 June 1917, but it was not until his fourth claim, on 14 January 1918, that he got his first official victory. By 1 February, he was an ace, with four of the next five victory claims confirmed. Then, from 4 February to 17 June 1918, he had nine consecutive unconfirmed wins. He then got confirmation of consecutive doubles on consecutive days, on 20 and 21 June. Beginning the next day, and running through 8 October, Reali submitted eleven claims, only two of which were approved as victories. In the end, Reali would have 11 of 33 combat claims approved as victories. Nevertheless, Sergente Reali won a Silver award of the Medal for Military Valor for his 1 February 1918 victory.

== Postwar ==
Reali left the service in 1919. He joined the Regia Aeronautica Reserves in 1923. By the end of 1940, he had risen to capitano, being promoted on 31 December. His role in World War II is unknown.

On 19 January 1975, Antonio Reali died in Fano, Italy.
