= Nieuport 24 =

French WW1 fighter aircraft

Nieuport 24 and 24bis
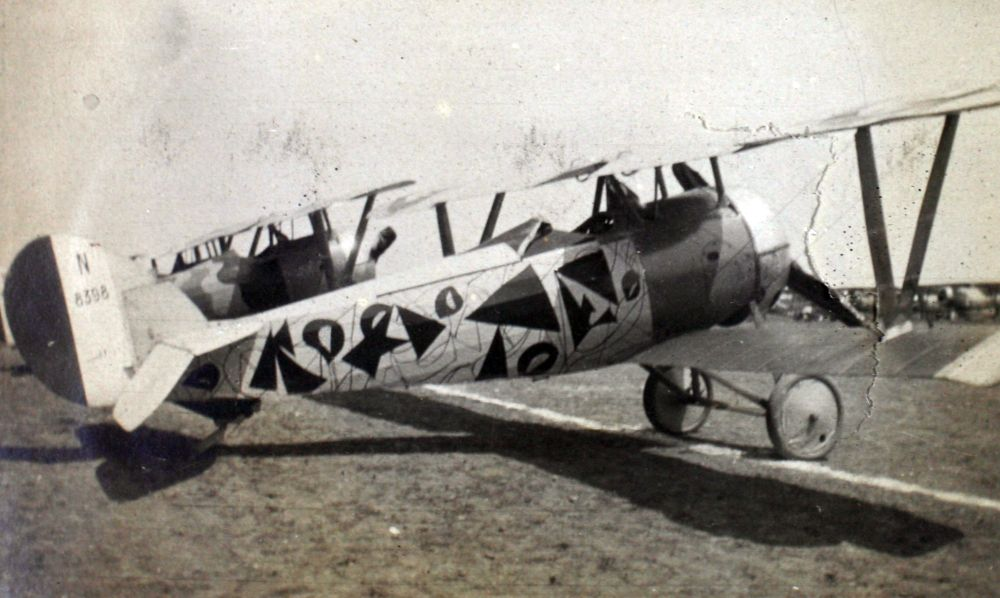
- Nieuport 24 C.1

General information
- Type: fighter / advanced trainer
- National origin: France
- Manufacturer: Nieuport, Nakajima, Dux
- Designer: Gustave Delage
- Status: retired
- Primary users: Aéronautique Militaire Royal Flying Corps; Imperial Russian Air Service

History
- Introduction date: Spring 1917
- First flight: 1917
- Developed from: Nieuport 17bis
- Variant: Nieuport 27

The Nieuport 24 (or Nieuport XXIV C.1 in contemporary sources) was a World War I French sesquiplane fighter aircraft designed by Gustave Delage as a development of the successful Nieuport 17.

The Nieuport 24 had the misfortune to be the penultimate design suited to tactics that were being superseded when it entered service. Its small size, relatively light weight and small engine gave it a significant manoeuvrability advantage in a dog fight. However, larger and heavier fighters that relied almost entirely on speed such as the SPAD VII and Albatros D.III were entering service along with the introduction of ever larger combat formations, which generally negated its manoeuvrability. While its handling was improved slightly, its performance was little better than the previous Nieuport 23 it was meant to replace, and so it was operated alongside larger numbers of the SPAD S.VII, although in November 1917, out of a French frontline fighter strength of 754 aircraft, Nieuports still made up 310 aircraft. Operational Nieuport 24s served with French, British and Russian units, and the type also served widely as an advanced trainer.

== Design and development ==
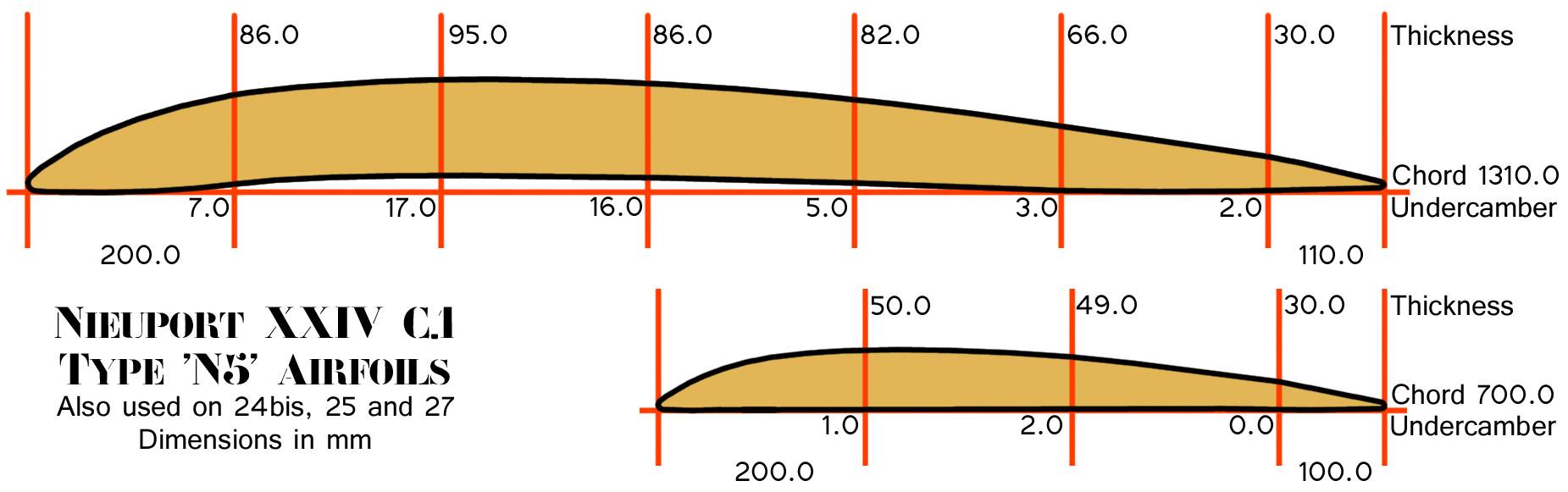
Nieuport 24 Type N5 airfoil drawings

The Nieuport 24 utilized a new wing of the same planform as the preceding Nieuport 23, but with a plywood leading edge and a new airfoil section having a flatter underside. The forward spar was moved aft, visibly affecting the cabane struts, which were then angled back. The ailerons had their tips rounded off and to reduce drag and were given a fabric strip reinforced with wire to cover the hinge gap, however the strip severely affected the type's handling, so it was removed shortly after service entry.

The same fuselage with minor detail changes was used as on the Nieuport 17bis, which featured an improved aerodynamic form compared to the earlier Nieuports, with longitudinal stringers running from just aft of the moulded plywood cockpit sides to the tail. Internally the structure was updated, and while the 17bis had its Vickers gun offset to port, the 24 had it mounted to the starboard of the centerline.

The 24 also received an entirely new rounded moulded plywood empennage incorporating a small fixed fin and a half-heart shaped rudder. Use of the new tail was delayed, and most production aircraft were of the Nieuport 24bis model, which reverted to the Nieuport 17 type tailplane and rectangular balanced rudder but was otherwise the same as the 24. The Nieuport 27 would use the new tail, along with a new split-axle undercarriage and internally sprung tailskid. The 24 retained the faired wood externally sprung tailskid used on previous types. A 130 hp (97 kW) Le Rhône rotary engine was fitted in a spun aluminium cowl similar to those used on the late models of the Nieuport 17 and 23.

The standard armament of the Nieuport 17 of a synchronised 7.70 mm (0.303 in) Vickers, and optionally an overwing 7.70 mm (0.303 in) Lewis gun in French or Italian service or a Lewis on a Foster mounting on the top wing in British service, was retained. Many 24 and 24bis airframes were used as advanced fighter-trainers and flown unarmed.

== Service history ==
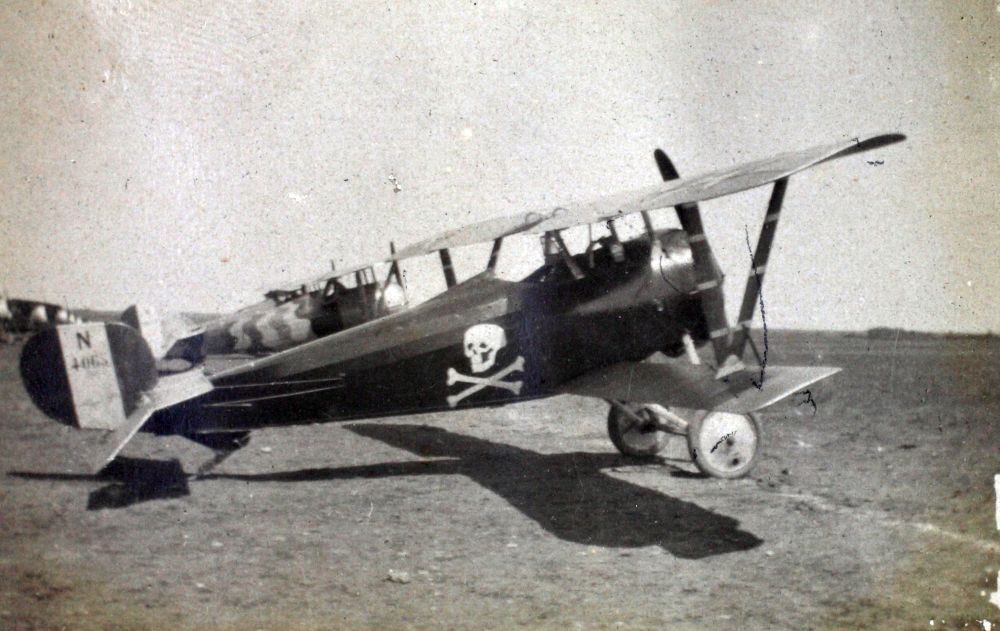
Nieuport 24bis trainers

In the summer of 1917, when the Nieuport 24 and 24bis began coming off the production line, many French fighter squadrons were replacing their Nieuport 17s with SPAD S.VIIs but some French units retained Nieuports into 1918 when they were effectively obsolete, although the type was preferred by some, especially the famous Charles Nungesser. The type's most notable accomplishment occurred when Nieuports of N152 were responsible for downing two Zeppelins, L49 and L50 during the night of 19–20 October 1917.

France's allies operated them, including the Russians and the British. The Russians would continue to operate their Nieuports throughout the Russian Civil War, and even received 20 French-built Nieuport 24s after the Czar's abdication. Production of additional examples was undertaken by Dux, who had licence-built previous Nieuports. Production was undertaken both before and after the Soviet victory. The Soviets would rename Dux to GAZ No 1 (Государственный авиационный завод No. 1 or State Aviation Plant No. 1) and production continued until at least 1923. Examples remained in service until at least 1925.

In the summer of 1917, the RFC still regarded deliveries of Nieuport scouts as a top priority although the 24 and 24bis were regarded as interim types pending Nieuport 27 deliveries. Royal Aircraft Factory S.E.5 deliveries began shortly afterward, but a low production rate forced the British to use their Nieuport scouts operationally well into 1918.

The Japanese bought several pattern aircraft and from 1921 to 1923 built 102, with work started by the Army Supply Depot at Tokorozawa until taken over by Nakajima. These were later designated as the Ko 3, however the Japanese did not distinguish between the 24 and the 27, initially calling both the Ni 24. Most of their Nieuport 24s were fitted with the 80 hp (60 kW) Le Rhône 9C. The Japanese operated them until the 1926, much longer than they did their SPAD S.XIIIs, which were retired in 1922.

The Americans bought large numbers of Nieuport advanced trainers for their flying schools in France in November 1917, which either included 227 Nieuport 24s and 16 Nieuport 24bis or 121 Nieuport 24s and 140 Nieuport 24bis, depending on which source you believe, illustrating the difficulty in dealing with surviving source documents which often didn't distinguish between the 24, 24bis and the 27.

The Soviet's donated a Nieuport 24 and other types in 1921 to Afghanistan's King Amanullah Khan. It still existed in 1924 when the Afghan Military Air Arm was formed.

== Variants ==
Nieuport 24 C.1
single seat fighter
Nieuport 24 E.1
unarmed single seat fighter-trainer, often fitted with an 80 hp (60 kW) Le Rhône 9C
Nieuport 24bis C.1
similar to 24 but used earlier metal tail with a comma shaped rudder and an angular horizontal tail.
Nieuport 24bis E.1
unarmed single seat fighter-trainer, often fitted with an 80 hp (60 kW) Le Rhône 9C
Nieuport 25 C.1
Similar to 24 or 27, but with larger 200 hp (150 kW) Clerget rotary. Very few produced.
Nieuport 26 C.1
Development of 24, powered by Hispano-Suiza V-8 engine.
Nieuport 27 C.1
development of 24 with pivoted tailskid and new undercarriage.
Nakajima 甲 3 (Ko-3)
Japanese designation for locally-built Nieuport 24/27.
Nieuport B.Kh2
Siamese designation for Nieuport 24bis.

== Operators ==
Afghanistan

- Afghan Military Air Arm

Brazil

- Brazilian Air Force – operated 6 examples

Bulgaria

- Bulgarian Air Force – One 24bis captured in 1917 was operated

France

- Service Aéronautique
  - Army Cooperation
    - Escadrille N.12
    - Escadrille N.23
    - Escadrille N.38
    - Escadrille N.49
    - Escadrille N.62
    - Escadrille N.68
    - Escadrille N.69
    - Escadrille N.75
    - Escadrille N.76
    - Escadrille N.77
    - Escadrille N.79
    - Escadrille N.82
    - Escadrille N.85
    - Escadrille N.87
    - Escadrille N.88
    - Escadrille N.89
    - Escadrille N.90
    - Escadrille N.91
    - Escadrille N.92
    - Escadrille N.93
    - Escadrille N.94
    - Escadrille N.95
    - Escadrille N.96
    - Escadrille N.97
    - Escadrille N.98
    - Escadrille N.99
    - Escadrille N.102
    - Escadrille N.124
    - Escadrille N.150
    - Escadrille N.151
    - Escadrille N.152
    - Escadrille N.155
    - Escadrille N.156
    - Escadrille N.157
    - Escadrille N.158
    - Escadrille N.159
    - Escadrille N.160
    - Escadrille N.161
    - Escadrille N.162
    - Escadrille N.312
    - Escadrille N.313
    - Escadrille N.314
    - Escadrille N.315
    - Escadrille N.392
    - Escadrille N.523
    - Escadrille N.561
    - Escadrille N.562
    - Escadrille N.581
  - Group de Combat 11
    - Escadrille N.12
    - Escadrille N.31
    - Escadrille N.48
    - Escadrille N.57
    - Escadrille N.94
  - Group de Combat 12
    - Escadrille N.3
    - Escadrille N.26
    - Escadrille N.73
    - Escadrille N.103
  - Group de Combat 13
    - Escadrille N.15
    - Escadrille N.65
    - Escadrille N.84
    - Escadrille N.124
  - Group de Combat 14
    - Escadrille N.75\
    - Escadrille N.80
    - Escadrille N.83
    - Escadrille N.86
  - Group de Combat 15
    - Escadrille N.78
    - Escadrille N.92
    - Escadrille N.93
    - Escadrille N.112
  - Provisional Groupe de Bonneuil
    - Escadrille N.82
    - Escadrille N.153
    - Escadrille N.154
    - Escadrille C46

Estonia

- Estonian Air Force – operated several examples postwar.

Greece

- Hellenic Air Force – operated around 20 Nieuport 24bis postwar with three unlicensed copies built locally in 1919.

Latvia

- Latvian Air Force – operated as many as 11 ex-Russian examples, postwar.

Japan

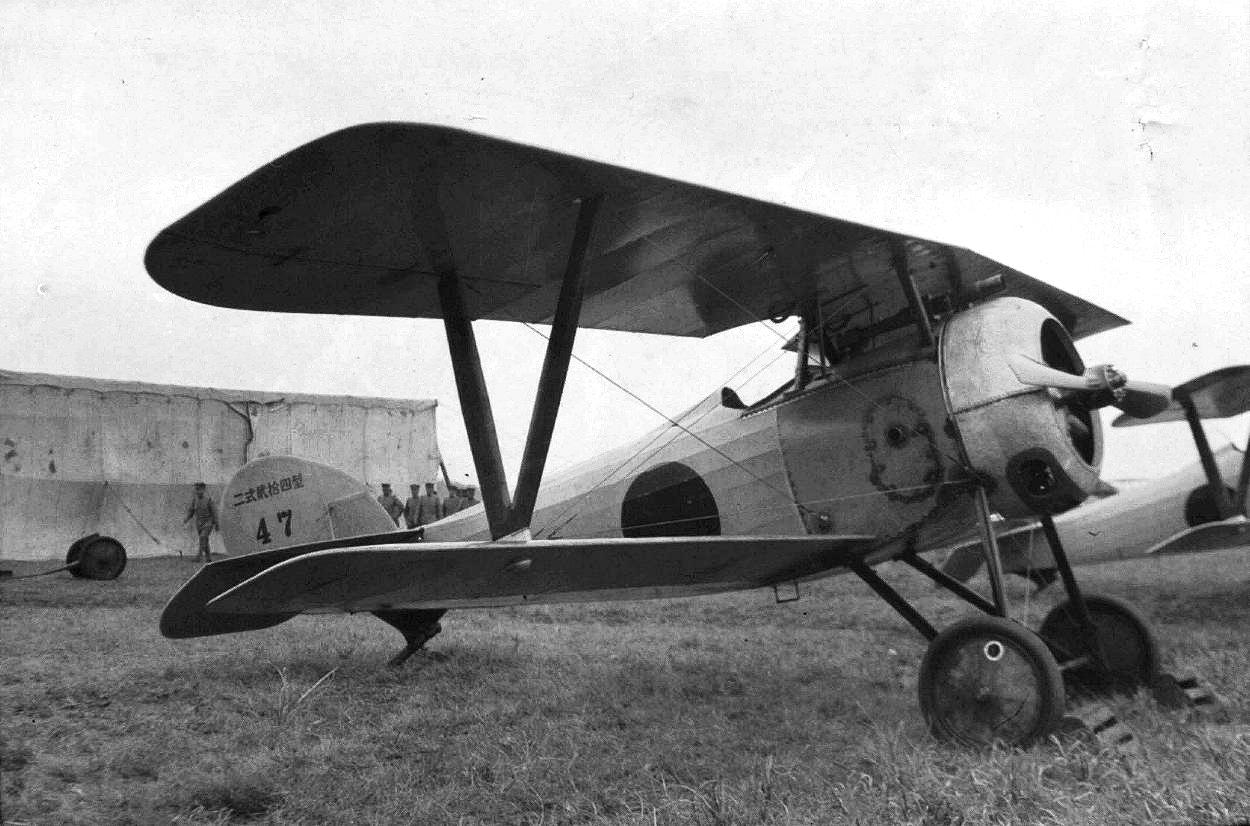
Japanese Nakajima Ko-3, a licence built Nieuport 24

- Imperial Japanese Army Air Force – built by Nakajima

Poland

- Polish Air Force – operated 1 ex-Russian Nieuport 24 and 5 Nieuport 24bis.

Romania

- Romanian Air Corps – operated several Nieuport 24s.

Russia

- Imperial Russian Air Service – operated 20 Nieuport 24s, plus additional examples built in Russia by Dux.

Serbia

- Serbian Air Force

(Thailand) Siam

- Royal Siamese Air Service

Turkey

- Turkish Air Force

United Kingdom

- Royal Flying Corps/Royal Air Force
  - No. 1 Squadron RFC
  - No. 29 Squadron RFC
  - No. 40 Squadron RFC
  - No. 111 Squadron RFC
  - No. 113 Squadron RFC

Soviet Union

- Workers' and Peasants' Red Air Fleet – operated ex-Imperial Russian Air Service aircraft.

United States

- American Expeditionary Force
- United States Army Air Service – operated a variety of Nieuport 24s and Nieuport 24bis as trainers.

== Specifications (Nieuport 24 C.1) ==
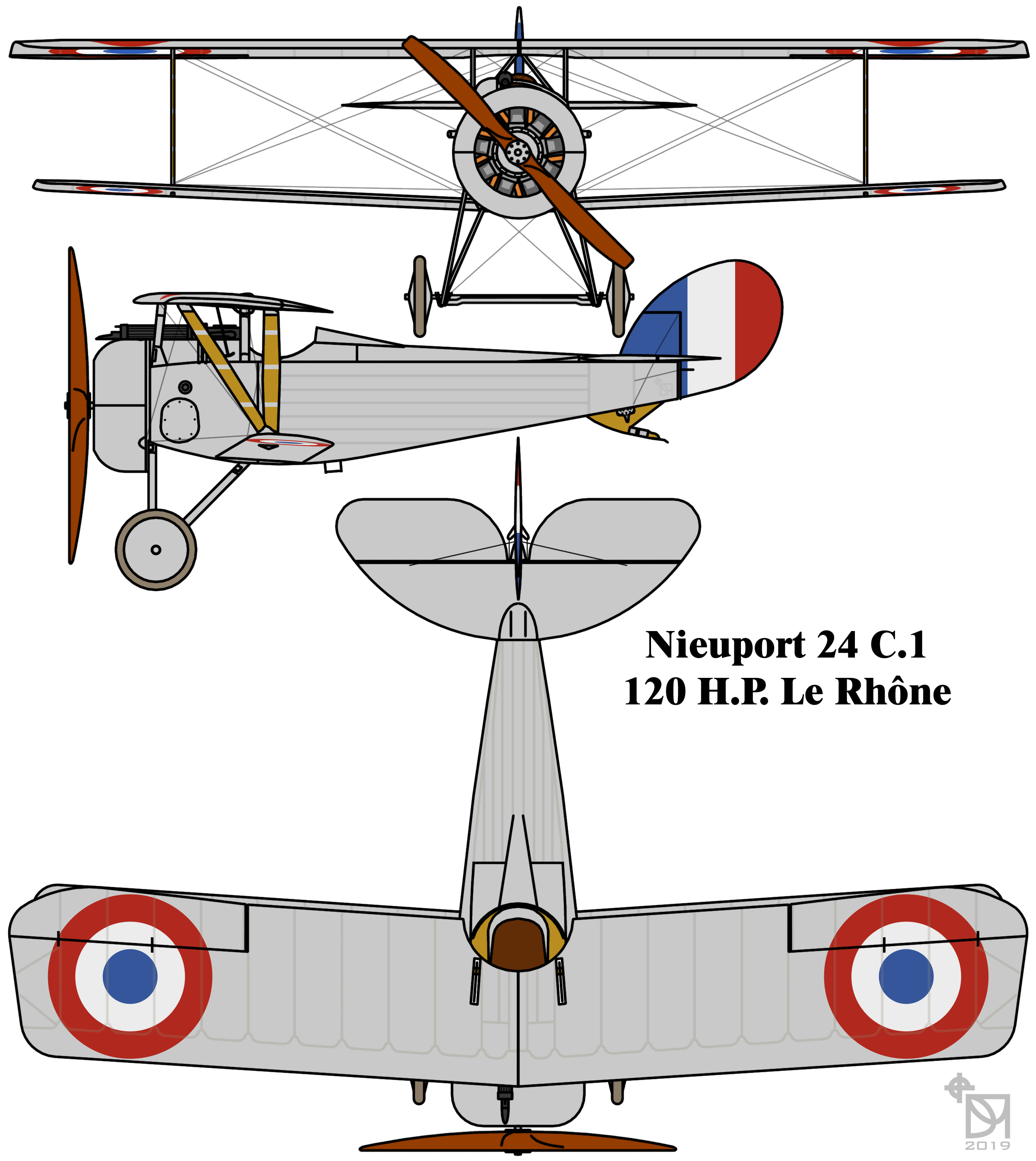
Nieuport 24 C.1 drawing

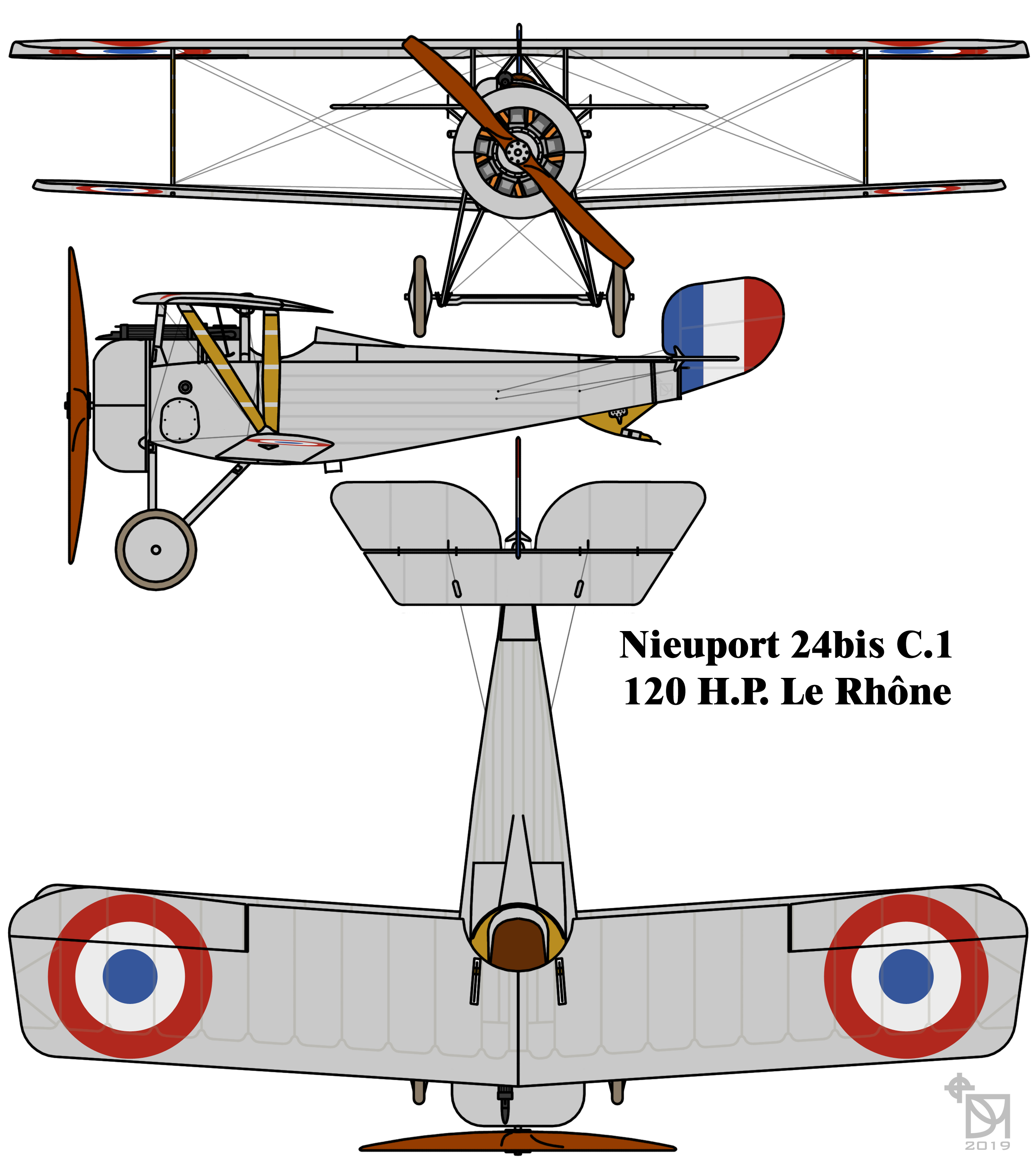
Nieuport 24bis C.1 drawing

Data from Varriale, Paolo (2015). Nieuport 24/27 at war!. Windsock/Centenary Datafile 167. Hertfordshire, Great Britain: Albatros Publications. p. 31. ISBN 978-1906798406.

General characteristics

- Crew: 1
- Length: 5.87 m (19 ft 3 in)
- Upper wingspan: 8.21 m (26 ft 11 in)
- Lower wingspan: 7.82 m (25 ft 8 in)
- Wing sweep: 3° 20'
- Height: 2.40 m (7 ft 10 in)
- Wing area: 14.75 m^{2} (158.8 sq ft)
- Airfoil: N5
- Empty weight: 355 kg (783 lb)
- Gross weight: 547 kg (1,206 lb)
- Undercarriage track: 1.6m
- Powerplant: 1 × Le Rhône 9Ja 90 kW (120 hp) or Le Rhône 9Jb rotary engine, 97 kW (130 hp)
- Propellers: 2-bladed Levasseur 549 or Régy 354 or Chauviere 2228 wooden propellers, 2.40 m (7 ft 10 in) diameter

Performance

- Maximum speed: 176 km/h (109 mph, 95 kn) at sea level
  - 171 km/h (106 mph; 92 kn) at 3,000 m (9,800 ft)
  - 169 km/h (105 mph; 91 kn) at 6,000 m (20,000 ft)
- Endurance: 2 hours, 15 minutes
- Service ceiling: 6,900 m (22,600 ft)
- Time to altitude:
  - 2 minutes 40 seconds to 1,000 m (3,300 ft)
  - 5 minutes 40 seconds to 2,000 m (6,600 ft)
  - 9 minutes 25 seconds to 3,000 m (9,800 ft)
  - 21 minutes 30 seconds to 5,000 m (16,000 ft)

Armament

- Guns:
  - in French or Russian service: 1 × synchronised Vickers machine gun plus optionally 1 × Lewis gun on upper wing.
  - in British service: 1 × Lewis gun on Foster mounting on upper wing.
  - in American service: none.

== See also ==
- 1917 in aviation

Related development

- Nieuport 17
- Nieuport 27
- Redfern Nieuport 17/24, replica for amateur construction
