= Pierre Marinovitch =

French World War I flying ace

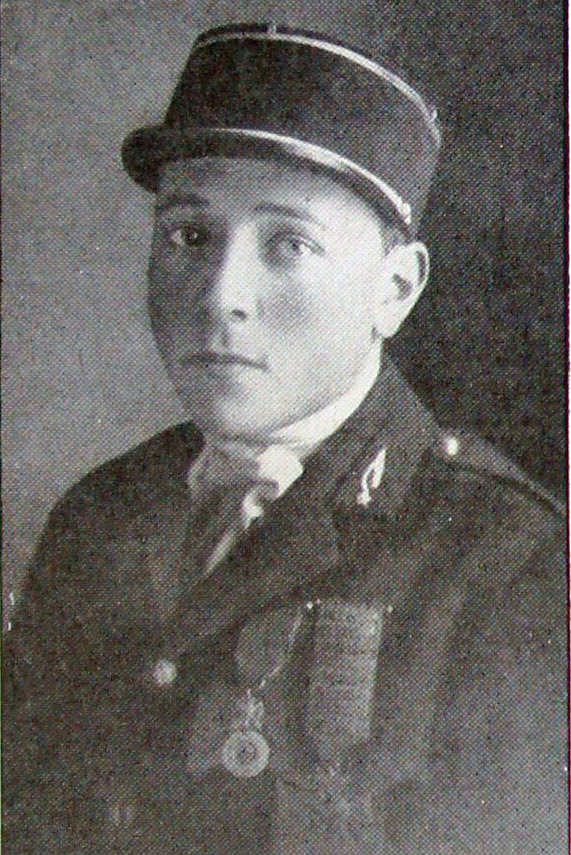
- Born: 1 August 1898; Paris, France
- Died: 2 October 1919 (aged 21); Brussels, Belgium
- Military career
- Allegiance: France
- Branch: Armée de l'Air
- Service years: 1916–19
- Rank: Lieutenant
- Nickname: Marino
- Unit: Escadrille Spa.94
- Conflicts: World War I
- Awards: Legion of Honour; Croix de Guerre (with 10 palms)

Pierre Marinovitch (Serbian: Петар Мариновић, romanized: Petar Marinović; 1 August 1898 – 2 October 1919) was a French World War I flying ace credited with 21 confirmed and 3 probable aerial victories. He was the youngest French flying ace of the war, scoring his 5th victory at age 19 years and 169 days. He was killed in an air accident following the war.

== Early life ==
Pierre Marinovitch was born in Paris on 1 August 1898, to Velizar and Agripina Marinović (née Bronkov). His father was a Serb and his mother was Polish. Marinovitch's paternal grandfather, Jovan Marinović, served as Prime Minister of Serbia between 1873 and 1874, and was Serbian ambassador to France from 1879 to 1889. His great-grandfather was wealthy Serbian merchant Miša Anastasijević. Marinovitch attended school in France and Ireland, and was fluent in English. He went by the nickname "Marino".

== World War I ==
Seventeen-year-old Marinovitch enlisted in 27e Régiment de Dragoons on 12 February 1916. On 16 July, he transferred to aviation as a student pilot, and received Military Pilots Brevet N.4910 on 15 November 1916. Marinovitch received his graduate diploma on 19 March 1917, and was assigned to Escadrille No. 38. He became seriously ill shortly afterwards, and had to spend two months in a French military hospital. Upon being released from hospital, he was assigned to Escadrille No. 94, which was being formed near Châlons-en-Champagne. The unit earned the nickname "The Reapers" and adopted the Grim Reaper as their logo.

Marinovitch was promoted to the rank of Maréchal-des-logis on 26 July 1917. On 10 January 1918, he was awarded the Médaille militaire (Order N.6239) in recognition of his third aerial victory. Marinovitch claimed his first four kills flying Nieuport 24s. On 30 January, Escadrille No. 94 was relocated to Villeneuve-les-Vertus and incorporated into Groupe de Chasse XVIII under Captain Jacques Sabattier de Vignolle.

Marinovitch was promoted to adjutant on 20 February 1918. On 26 March, he attacked a German two-seater 800 metres (2,600 ft) above Caurel, and watched as it spiraled towards the ground exuding smoke before he disengaged at a height of 400 metres (1,300 ft). This was initially listed as a "probable kill", and was not confirmed until after the war. On 15 May, Marinovitch downed a German reconnaissance plane over Essertaux. Its crew was later taken prisoner. Four days later, Marinovitch shot down a Rumpler just south of Moreuil. By this point, the French press began referring to him as "The Youngest Ace" (Benjamin des As), because of his youth.

On 31 May, Marinovitch shot down a two-seater near Villers-Cotterêts. The pilot, unteroffizier Hippolyt Kaminski, was killed, and his observer was captured. A few minutes later, Marinovitch downed a Fokker Dr.I. On 5 June, Marinovitch and André-Henri Martenot de Cordou teamed up to destroy a German two-seater over Parcy-et-Tigny on 5 June. On 1 July, Marinovitch downed another Rumpler near Monnes. Two weeks later, Marinovitch participated in the destruction of two German planes. On 22 July, he destroyed another Rumpler. He was made Chevalier de la Legion of Honour on 11 August 1918. On 17 August, he shot down a Rumpler and a Fokker D.VII. Marinovitch was promoted to second lieutenant on 20 October, and awarded the Croix de guerre. He was credited with 21 aerial victories during the war.

== Death ==
Marinovitch survived the war, and continued to fly. He was killed in a flying accident in Brussels on 2 October 1919.
