= Jean Casale =

French World War I flying ace

Jean Pie Hyacinthe Paul Jerome Casale
- Born: 24 September 1893; Olmeta-di-Tuda, Corsica, France
- Died: 23 June 1923 (aged 29)
- Military career
- Allegiance: France
- Branch: Aviation
- Service years: 1913–c. 1918
- Rank: Sous lieutenant
- Units: 8eme Régiment de Chasseurs, Escadrille 8, Escadrille 76, Escadrille 23, Escadrille 156, Escadrille 38
- Awards: Légion d'honneur, Médaille militaire, Croix de Guerre, Mentioned in Dispatches four times

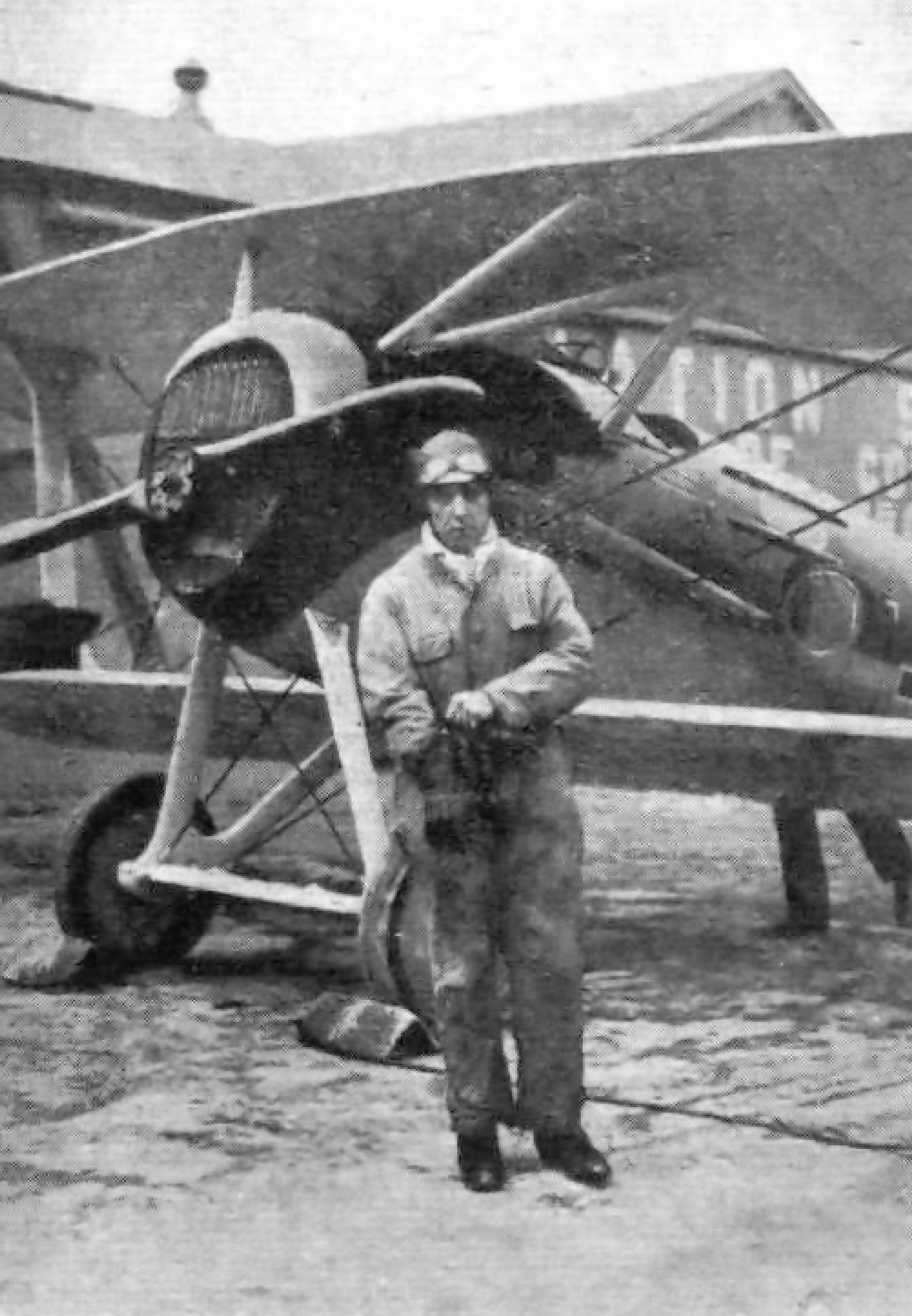
Lieut. Jean Casale standing by the SPAD S.27 he flew during several record breaking flights

Sous Lieutenant Jean Pie Hyacinthe Paul Jerome Casale, was a French World War I flying ace credited with thirteen aerial victories. He was one of the few aces that survived the entire course of fighter aviation in the war.

== Early life ==
Jean Pie Hyacinthe Paul Jerome Casale, was born on 24 September 1893 in Olmeta-di-Tuda, Corsica.

== Early military service ==
The marquis joined the military on 1 October 1913. He was posted to the 8eme Régiment de Chasseurs as an enlisted soldier. When World War I began, he requested transfer to aviation duty, with his reassignment coming after exactly one year of service. He received Pilot's Brevet No. 837 on 20 April 1915. One month later, on 20 May, he was assigned to 1er Groupe d'Aviation. He quickly moved on to Escadrille 8 (Squadron 8) as a pilot flying Maurice Farmans, as he was promoted to Caporal there on 5 June. His fellow pilots gave him the nickname of "Marquis de Monferrato", in reference of the Italian city of Casale Monferrato, but Jean Casale never had any nobility title, nor any link with this Italian city.

== Success as a flying ace ==
He scored a pioneering aerial victory on 8 July 1915. He was posted to Escadrille 23 for a bit, and was promoted to Sergeant on 21 August 1915. He then switched to Escadrille 67 on 21 January 1916. He returned to Escadrille 23 on 1 March 1916. Casale was awarded the Médaille militaire on 19 May 1916. On 15 August, he was promoted to Adjutant. He scored his second win on 2 September 1916. By 10 December, he was an ace, with an observation balloon and four enemy planes shot down, including one shared with Maxime Lenoir.

On 7 March 1917, Marquis Casale was honored with an appointment as Chevalier de la Légion d'honneur. On 24 June, he received a temporary commission as Sous Lieutenant. He also added four more aerial victories scattered through 1917, with his ninth coming on 21 September.

Having been decorated with the Légion d'honneur and the Médaille militaire, as well as commissioned, he transferred to Escadrille 156 on 6 March 1918 to fly a Spad. He had no success there, and was posted onwards to Escadrille 38, which was also equipped with Spads. There he shared a balloon with Georges Madon on his day of arrival, 1 June 1918; he was then credited with three more enemy airplanes, with the final victory on 1 November 1918.

== Postwar ==
Casale was killed in a flying accident on 23 June 1923 while flying a four-engine Blériot 115.

== Honors and awards ==
Chevalier de la Légion d'honneur

"Pursuit pilot of exceptional strength and bravery. Since the battle of Verdun, he has had more than 90 combats, returning several times with his plane riddled by enemy bullets. Decorated with the Médaille militaire in May 1916, he has since downed five enemy aircraft. On 11 February 1917, he attacked a balloon, strafing it to a very low altitude. Pursued during the course of this attack by two enemy planes, he engaged them in the most violent combat at 10 kilometers behind their lines; he returned with his plane badly damaged. Two wounds, four citations in army orders." (Chevalier de la Légion d'honneur citation)

Médaille militaire

"Pilot of exceptional courage who, for more than a year, has rendered distinguished service in an Army Corps Escadrille, then in a pursuit Escadrille. Specializing in reconnaissances of long duration, he always executed these missions by having numerous and difficult aerial combats. On 26 April 1916, attacked by two enemy planes, he put them to flight successively and continued his reconnaissance although his plane was seriously hit by enemy bullets. Already cited in army orders." (Médaille militaire citation)
