= Henri Hay De Slade =

French WWI flying ace (1893-1979)

Henri Joseph Marie Hay de Slade
- Captain Henri Hay de Slade poses beside his SPAD XIII.
- Born: 29 May 1893; Brest, France
- Died: 2 November 1979 (aged 86)
- Military career
- Allegiance: France
- Branch: Aviation
- Rank: Capitaine
- Units: Escadrille Spa80; Escadrille Spa.86
- Commands: Escadrille Spa.159
- Awards: Grand Officer of the Légion d'honneur Médaille militaire Croix de Guerre with 14 Palms; Military Cross (Britain); Order of the Crown (Italy)

Capitaine (later Colonel) Henri Joseph Marie Hay de Slade (29 May 1893 – 2 November 1979) was a French World War I flying ace credited with 19 aerial victories. He was notable for taking command of fighter squadron Escadrille Spa.159 when it had suffered 13 losses without a victory, and turning it into an efficient fighting force.

== Biography ==
Henri Hay de Slade was born in Brest, France on 29 May 1893.

Hay de Slade came from a military family; his father, who died in 1908, was a naval officer. Hay de Slade began his military career as a cadet at Saint Cyr in 1913. He transferred to aviation on 13 May 1916, and received his pilot's certificate in August of that year. After further training, he was assigned to Escadrille Spa80 on 13 December 1916. After his reassignment to Escadrille N86 and its Nieuport fighters, on 16 April 1917, he began to succeed as an aerial warrior. On 20 May, he scored his first victory. He closed out 1917 as an ace; on 5 December, he scored his fifth victory. He scored six more times with Escadrille 86, the last on 21 July 1918.

One week later, he was assigned to command Escadrille Spa.159. It was an unenviable assignment; the squadron had lost 13 pilots, including its former commander, without scoring a single triumph in return. Hay de Slade took instant action. He painted bold red stripes around the fuselage of his Spad S.XIII, and told his pilots to watch his tactics in dogfights. The squadron learned by watching him, and began to score. Hay de Slade, despite his new duties, scored two wins in August, two in September, two on 1 October 1918 and two on 10 October 1918. His final tally was 16 enemy aircraft and three observation balloons.

Hay de Slade left the army in 1926 to become a gentleman-farmer in the village of Derval, where he had inherited a domain from his family. He became the mayor of the village from 1935 to 1974. During World War II he was briefly mobilized with the rank of commandant, with a special assignment to direct an aviation factory. After the liberation of France his arrest for collaboration was ordered by the Liberation committee (CDL) for Loire Inférieure. His deputy, however, "described as a recruiting sergeant for the Francists," whipped the locals into a frenzy by portraying the arrest as an attempted communist takeover, and a crowd of one hundred fifty locals beat up the two CDL representatives who arrived to enforce it. Hay de Slade was formally "dismissed as mayor but continued to open the mail and to give orders, in conjunction with the curé, as if he were still in office." He died on 2 November 1979.
