= Maxime Lenoir =

French flying ace

Maxime Albert Lenoir
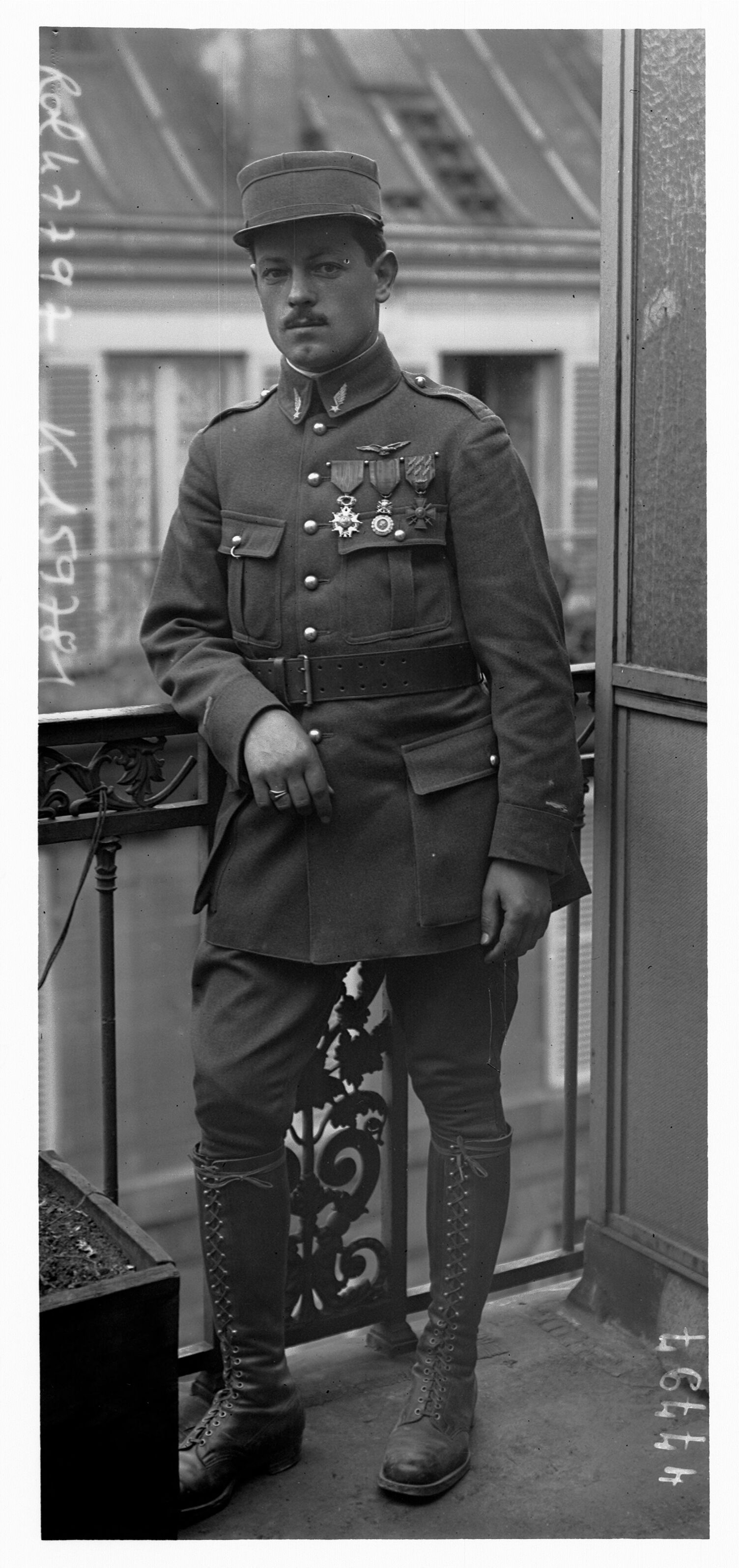
- Lenoir in 1916
- Born: 22 December 1888; Chargé, France
- Died: 25 October 1916 (aged 27)
- Military career
- Allegiance: France
- Branch: Aviation
- Service years: 1913–1916
- Rank: Adjutant
- Units: Escadrille No. 18, Escadrille No. 23
- Awards: Légion d'honneur, Médaille militaire, Croix de Guerre with eight Palmes

Adjutant Maxime Albert Lenoir (22 December 1888 – 25 October 1916) was a pioneering World War I flying ace credited with eleven confirmed aerial victories, as well as eight unconfirmed.

== Biography ==
=== Early life ===
Maxime Albert Lenoir was born on 22 December 1888 in Chargé, France. Lenoir trained as a pilot in 1913, receiving a civilian Pilot's Brevet, No. 1564, on 5 December. He was already a pilot when World War I had begun.

=== Aerial service ===
The start of World War I saw Lenoir mobilized for military service. He applied for a transfer to aviation duty. He completed his military aviation training, receiving Military Pilot's Brevet No. 641, and after a few weeks delay, was assigned to Escadrille 18 to fly a Caudron. He downed an Aviatik on 5 June 1915, and became a balloon buster on the 15th. Lenoir then trained on single-seaters, and was posted to fly a Nieuport fighter with Escadrille 23 in early 1916. He scored his first fighter victory on 16 March 1916, and added eight more by 25 September, including shares with Jean Casale and Georges Lachmann. He was wounded twice that year, by shrapnel on 9 August and in aerial combat on 25 September.

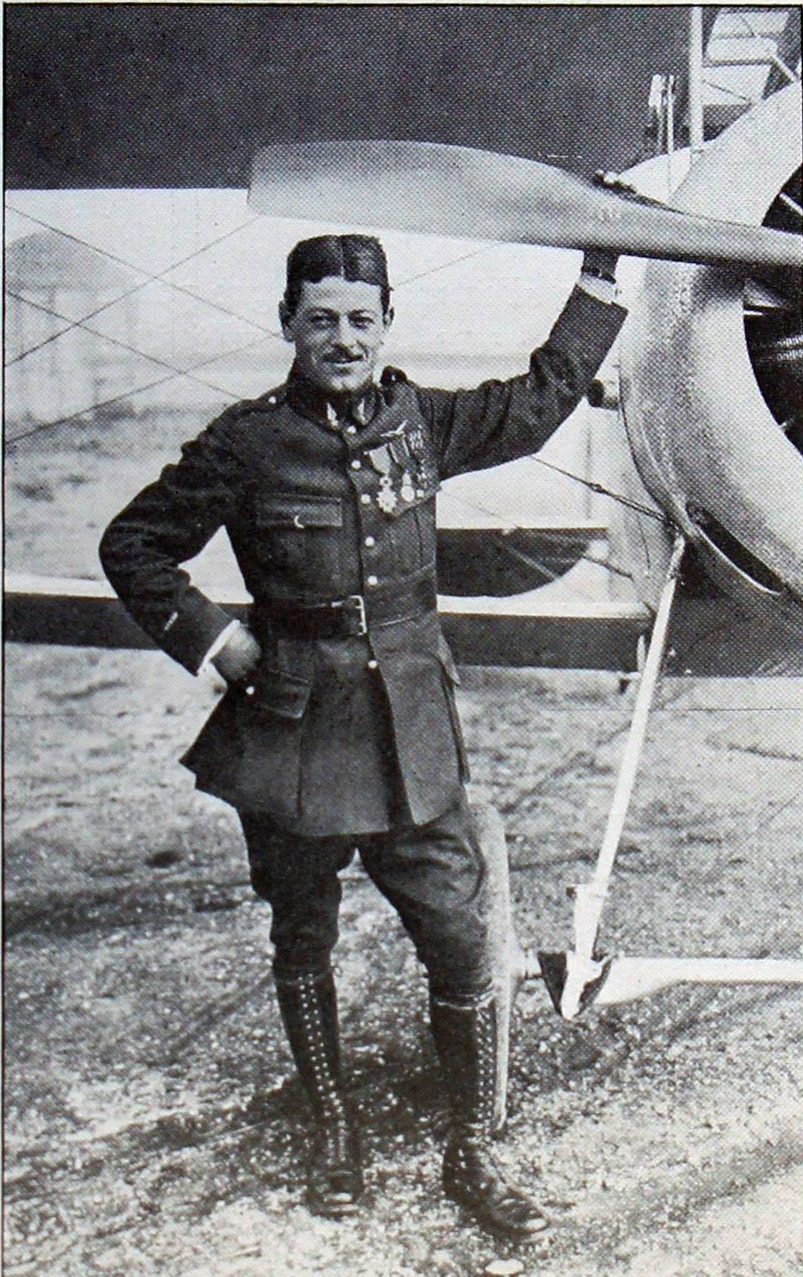
French aviator Maxime Lenoir stands beside a Nieuport 17 fighter aircraft in 1915.

On the latter occasion, he was flying his new SPAD VII fighter. Lenoir was one of the first French fliers to be issued the new fighter. He was wounded while attacking a German three-seater that he shot down. It was his 11th and final confirmed victory.

To the SPAD VII's ordinary markings, Lenoir added his initials on the left rim of the cockpit above a black silhouette of a man's head. Emblazoned down the fuselage's side was the slogan Trompe le Mort (Deceives death) and the numerals '111'.

Maxime Albert Lenoir was killed in action on 25 October 1916.

== Honors and awards ==
Chevalier de la Légion d'honneur

Adjutant pilot of Escadrille N23. During eleven months of service in the Escadrille, he engaged in 91 combats, with his aircraft frequently sustained damage from gunfire. He downed a sixth enemy aircraft on 4 August 1916. (Chevalier de la Légion d'honneur citation, 9 August 1916).

Médaille militaire

Maréchal-des-logis pilot of Escadrille N23. As a non-commissioned officer, he successfully performed impressive and risky tasks. For instance, on 15 March 1916, while protecting a long-distance reconnaissance vehicle, his machine gun jammed during combat. Despite this, he managed to avoid enemy planes through a series of risky maneuvers and successfully completed his mission. (Médaille militaire citation, 15 March 1916)

He also won the Croix de Guerre with eight Palmes.

== Sources of information ==
| Preceded by Jean Chaput | Top Flying Ace; France, World War I | Succeeded by Albert Louis Deullin |
