= Risacher =

Risacher is a surname. Notable people with the name include:

- Aïnhoa Risacher (born 2007), French basketball player
- Louis Risacher (1894–1986), French World War I flying ace
- Stéphane Risacher (born 1972), French basketball player
- Zaccharie Risacher (born 2005), French basketball player
