= N80 =

N80 may refer to:

== Roads ==
- Molave–Dipolog Road, in the Philippines
- N-80 National Highway, in Pakistan
- N80 road (Ireland)

== Other uses ==
- N80 (Long Island bus)
- Escadrille N.80, a unit of the French Air Force
- Nakkara language
- Nikon N80, a camera
- Nokia N80, a smartphone
- Toyota Hilux (N80), a Japanese pickup truck
