= Hector Garaud =

Hector Eugene Joseph Garaud
- Born: 27 August 1897; Saint-Antoine, Isère, France
- Died: 5 April 1940 (aged 42); Montpellier, France
- Military career
- Allegiance: France
- Branch: Aviation
- Service years: 1915–1918, 1939–1940
- Rank: Commandant
- Units: Escadrille 97, Escadrille 38
- Awards: Légion d'honneur, Médaille militaire, Croix de Guerre, Mentioned in Dispatches, British Military Medal

Sous Lieutenant Hector Eugene Joseph Garaud was a World War I flying ace credited with thirteen aerial victories. He was one of the rare aces who survived the earliest era of fighter aviation.

== Early life ==
Hector Eugene Joseph Garaud was born on 2 February 1897 in Saint-Antoine, Isère, France.

== World War I service ==
Garaud began his military service on 12 July 1915, being assigned directly to the 2e Groupe d'Aviation as an enlisted soldier. On 28 September, he moved to Parc d'Aviation No. 100 for training. Afterwards he was sent to Escadrille V97 (the 'V' standing for Voisin) on 4 November 1915. There he served as an observer/gunner, winning a Mention in Dispatches.

On 16 August 1916, he reported for pilot's training at Buc. He was awarded Pilot's Brevet No. 4804 on 21 October 1916. Eight days later, he was assigned to Avord for further training. He was promoted to Caporal on 11 November 1916 before being forwarded to Cazau and Pau for advanced training. He arrived at Escadrille Spa.38 on 16 April 1917; he scored his first win on 12 May. He was promoted to Sergeant on 25 June. He scored three more victories on 29 October, 13 November and 12 December 1917. On 22 December 1917, he became an ace, teaming up with Marcel Henriot and Gabriel Guérin to shoot down a German two-seater over Livry-Louvercy. The following day, Garaud shared his sixth win with Georges Madon.

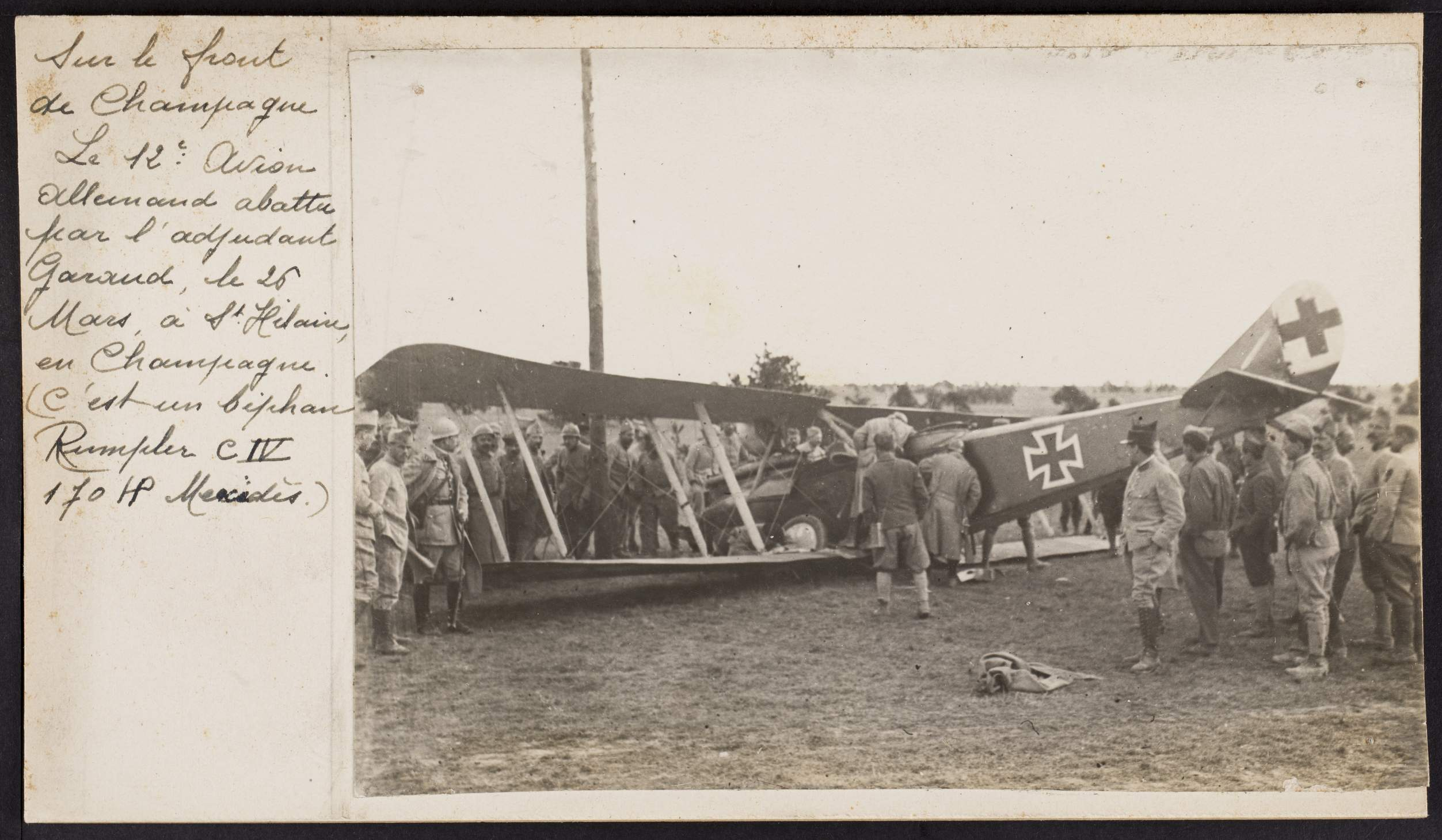
The Rumpler CIV shot down by Garaud for his twelfth victory.

Garaud began 1918 by scoring his seventh victory on 1 January. He received the Médaille militaire the next day. On 19 February, he shot down another German, over Prunay. The next day, he was promoted to Adjutant. In March, he scored four more times, but took a bullet through the right lung on the same day he shot down the last of these, on the 26th. Coincidentally, he was awarded the honor of Chevalier de la Légion d'honneur that same day.

Garaud would score one final time, on 12 August 1918. On 3 October, he was wounded by shrapnel in the face. On the 20th, he was commissioned as a temporary sous lieutenant. Hector Garaud's war ended with 495 hours flight time in his logbook, and the Légion d'honneur, Médaille militaire, and Croix de Guerre with eight palmes and two etoiles on his chest.

== Post war life ==
Garaud died in a flying accident on 2 April 1940, piloting a Curtiss P-36 fighter; he held the rank of Commandant upon his death.

== Honors and awards ==
Text of award of the Médaille militaire

"Pursuit pilot beyond compare, he has downed eleven enemy planes. He was seriously wounded after having downed his 12th plane."
