= Louis Risacher =

- Born: Louis Georges Robert Risacher; 16 July 1894; Paris, France
- Died: 10 June 1986 (aged 91); Levallois-Perret, Hauts-de-Seine, France
- Military career
- Allegiance: France
- Branch: Aviation
- Service years: 1914–1918
- Rank: Sous lieutenant
- Units: Escadrille N.3, Escadrille Spa.159
- Awards: Legion d'Honneur; Croix de Guerre
- Other work: Commanded Groupe III/10 during World War II.

Sous lieutenant Louis Georges Robert Risacher (16 July 1894 – 10 June 1986) was a French World War I flying ace credited with five aerial victories. He would return to his nation's service during World War II.

== Biography ==
See also Aerial victory standards of World War I

Loui Risacher was born in Paris on 16 July 1894.

He began his military service on 19 December 1914 as an infantryman. On 5 October 1915, he was severely wounded, and medically evacuated from combat duty. He would not be again fit for duty until 26 May 1916. On 1 July 1916, he was transferred to aviation service; he reported for pilot training on 9 August. He received his Military Pilot's Brevet on 16 October 1916. After advanced training, he was posted to Escadrille N.3. On 1 April 1918, he was returned to the rear for further training. He scored his first aerial victory on 16 May, with another in early August before he transferred to Escadrille Spa.159 on 17 August. He shot down two more German planes on August 31, 1918, and capped off his victory skein by shooting down a Fokker D.VII on 18 October 1918.

Risacher would return to his country's defense in World War II, leading Groupe III/10.

== Honors and awards ==
- Chevalier of the Legion d'honneur: World War I
- Commandeur of the Legion d'honneur: World War II
- Croix de guerre 1914–1918 (France) with four palmes and anetoile de bronze
- Croix de Guerre 1939–1945
