= Jean Bozon-Verduraz =

Jean Seraphin Benjamin Emmanuel Bozon-Verduraz
- Born: 29 May 1889; Saint-Étienne-de-Cuines, France
- Died: 21 June 1942 (aged 53)
- Military career
- Allegiance: France
- Branch: Cavalry; aviation
- Rank: Lieutenant
- Units: 4eme Regiment de Dragon, 9eme Regiment de Hussards, Escadrille 11, Escadrille 3
- Commands: Escadrille 94
- Awards: Légion d'honneur, Médaille militaire, Croix de Guerre with 8 palmes, 2 étoiles de vermeil, and 1 étoile de bronze, Russian Cross of Saint George

Lieutenant Jean Seraphin Benjamin Emmanuel Bozon-Verduraz was a French flying ace during World War I. A prewar soldier, he was recalled and switched from cavalry to aviation to achieve 11 confirmed aerial victories.

== Early life ==
Jean Seraphin Benjamin Emmanuel Bozon-Verduraz was born on 29 May 1889 in Saint-Étienne-de-Cuines, France.

== World War I service ==
Bozon-Verduraz joined the French military on 1 October 1910. On 3 April 1911, he was promoted to enlisted Brigadier. On 25 September 1912, on the day he was released from duty, he was also promoted to Maréchal-des-logis. He was recalled to duty when World War I began. After a requested transfer to aviation, he went to Crotoy for pilot's training. After advanced training at Bourget, he received Pilot's Brevet No. 2437 on 19 January 1916. On 10 March, he was assigned to Escadrille C11 (the 'C' denoting the squadron's use of Caudrons). He was injured in an accident on 12 May 1916. He was promoted to Adjutant on 21 November 1916.

On 28 May 1917, he went to fighter school; by 15 June, he was a Nieuport pilot with Escadrille 3. He was commissioned a Sous lieutenant on 11 July.

Bozon-Verduraz scored his first aerial triumphs on 16, 17, and 20 February 1918. He was subsequently appointed a Chevalier in the Légion d'honneur on 5 April. He promptly tallied two more victories in April, becoming an ace on the 21st. After scoring thrice more in May, on 1 July he was appointed to command a Spad squadron, Escadrille 94. Subsequently, he was promoted to temporary Lieutenant on the 18th. Leading from the front, Bozon-Verduraz scored three more times with his new escadrille. He finished out his war with 11 confirmed victories scored in logging over 683 hours flight time.

== Honors and awards ==
Légion d'Honneur
"Remarkable officer pilot; during two years, he has gained the admiration of the Army Corps Escadrille with which he served, carrying out the most arduous missions, never ceasing to seek battle with a joyous zeal. He downed, one after the other, three enemy planes in the space of four days. One wound. Three citations."
—Légion d'Honneur citation—

Bozon-Verduraz also won the Médaille Militaire, the Croix de guerre, and the Russian Cross of Saint George.
