= Escadrille Spa.95 =

- Active: 1917–1918
- Country: France
- Branch: French Air Service
- Type: Fighter Squadron
- Battle honours: Twice Mentioned in dispatches

Escadrille Spa.95 (also known as Escadrille N.95) was a French fighter squadron active during the final 19 months of World War I. Incorporated into larger formations within three months of its forming in April 1917, the squadron served throughout the war. It was twice Mentioned in dispatches, and credited with 15 confirmed aerial victories by the 11 November 1918 ceasefire.

== History ==
Initially, Detachments N.517 and N.519 were based at Vadelaincourt, France on 15 April 1917. On 15 May they were merged into a squadron dubbed Escadrille NF; the new unit's name quickly changed to Escadrille 106 before settling on Escadrille N.95 on 20 May. On 7 July 1917, they were transferred to VI Armee, then onwards to II Armee in September.

In February 1918, the squadron was one of four incorporated into Groupe de Combat 19, which in turn was one of the Groupes being gathered into Escadre de Combat No. 1 as the French concentrated their air power. Re-equipped with SPAD S.7 and SPAD S.13 fighters, renamed Escadrille Spa.95, and flying and fighting with the Escadre, the squadron was twice Mentioned in dispatches, on 26 September and 4 October 1918. By war's end on 11 November 1918, Escadrille Spa.95 was credited with the destruction of 15 enemy aircraft, with a further 19 claims going unconfirmed.

== Commanding officers ==
- Lieutenant Herissant: 15 April 1917 - death in flying accident 6 May 1917
- Lieutenant du Dore: 6 May 1917 - ?
- Capitaine Francois de Castel: ? - 16 June 1917
- Lieutenant du Dore: 16 June 1917 - 2 October 1917
- Lieutenant Didier Lecour Grandmaison: 2 October 1917 - 23 March 1918
- Lieutenant Marcel Hugues: 23 March 1918 - war's end

== Aircraft ==
- Nieuport 23s: 15 April 1917 - 24 February 1918
- Nieuport 24s: 15 April 1917 - 24 February 1918
- SPAD S.7s: 24 February 1918 - war's end
- SPAD S.13s: 24 February 1918 - war's end
