= Charles Lefevre =

French flying ace

Charles Eugene Joseph Marie Lefevre
- Born: 30 July 1893; Marseille, France
- Died: 1 March 1948 (aged 54)
- Military career
- Allegiance: France
- Branch: Chasseurs; aviation
- Service years: 1912–?
- Rank: Capitaine
- Unit: Escadrille 15
- Commands: Escadrille N.152; Escadrille Spa.96
- Awards: Legion d'Honneur, Croix de Guerre

Charles Eugene Joseph Marie Lefevre (30 July 1893 – 1 March 1948) was a French flying ace credited with six aerial victories during the First World War. He led two different fighter squadrons into combat to do so, and won the Legion d'honneur for his exploits.

== Biography ==
Charles Eugene Joseph Marie Lefevre was born in Marseille, France, on 30 July 1893. He volunteered for military service on 8 October 1912. He served in the ranks of the cavalry until 11 October 1913, when he was selected as an aspirant for officer's training. He would become an officer on 5 August 1914, and a lieutenant on 4 April 1916.

On 14 April 1916, he went to pilot training. He received his pilot's brevet on 12 July 1916. On 20 December 1916, he began serving as a Nieuport fighter pilot for Escadrille N.15. On 20 June 1917, he took command of Escadrille N.152. He scored his first aerial victory with them on 20 October 1917, downing Zeppelin L.49. However, he lost his command when he was medically evacuated on 5 November.

Upon recovery, he was given command of Escadrille Spa.96 on 17 May 1918. Shortly thereafter, on 14 July, he was promoted to Capitaine. He scored a series of five victories at about this time, including one over an observation balloon. On 29 August 1918, he was wounded in action. Upon recovery, he was appointed to the Aviation Mission to Japan on 1 October 1918.

Lefevre won the Legion d'honneur on 9 November 1917, after winning the Croix de Guerre with three palmes, an etoile de argent, and an etoile de bronze. He died on 1 March 1948.
