= Escadrille Spa.94 =

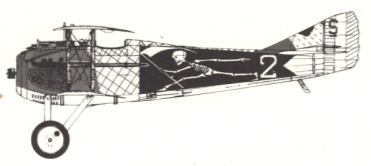
- Side view of SPAD S.XIII from Escadrille SPA.94 with the squadron's Grim Reaper Insignia
- Active: 1917–1918
- Country: France
- Branch: French Air Service
- Type: Fighter Squadron
- Battle honours: Mentioned in dispatches

Escadrille Spa.94 (originally Escadrille N.94) was a French fighter squadron active from mid-1917 until World War I ended on 11 November 1918. While it spent 1918 merged into larger formations, the squadron destroyed 42 enemy aircraft.

== History ==
French aviation Detachments N.512, N.513, and N.514 were merged at Melette, France on 14 May 1917 to found Escadrille N.94. It used Nieuport 24 and Nieuport 27 fighters to support IV Armee. On 30 January 1918, the squadron was one of four merged at Villeneuve to form Groupe de Combat 18, which in turn was one of three Groupe de Combats merged to become Escadre de Combat No. 1.

In February 1918, the squadron refitted with SPAD fighters, becoming Escadrille Spa.94. On 4 October 1918, the Escadre was Mentioned in dispatches; thus, Escadrille Spa.94 won a citation. By war's end on 11 November 1918, the squadron was credited with 42 confirmed aerial victories.

== Commanding officers ==
- Capitaine Edouard Pillet: 14 May 1917 – late April 1918
- Lieutenant de la Rochefordiere: Late April 1918 – killed in action 11 June 1918
- Lieutenant Jean Bozon-Verduraz: 11 June 1918 until war's end

== Notable members ==
- Sous lieutenant Pierre Marinovitch
- Sous lieutenant André-Henri Martenot de Cordou

== Aircraft ==
- Nieuport 24 fighters: 14 May 1917 – February 1918
- Nieuport 27 fighters: 14 May 1917 – February 1918
- SPAD fighters: February 1918 onwards
