= Antoine Laplasse =

French pilot (1883–1918)

- Born: 16 May 1883; Vernay, France
- Died: 22 August 1918 (aged 35); Saint Gobain, France
- Military career
- Allegiance: France
- Branch: Aviation
- Rank: Adjutant-Chef
- Unit: Escadrille 461, Escadrille Spa.75
- Awards: Médaille militaire Croix de Guerre

Adjutant-Chef Antoine Laplasse was a World War I balloon buster and flying ace credited with eight aerial victories, six of which were against observation balloons.

He was a pioneer aviator who earned his civilian pilot's license on the eve of World War I. As a result, he soon was assigned aviation duty, and defended his country throughout the war. He was killed in action less than three months before war's end.

== Early life and service ==
Antoine Laplasse was born on 16 May 1883 in Vernay, Rhône, France. He was a pioneer aviator, receiving his Civil Pilot's Brevet, No. 1655, on 11 July 1914. France's declaration of war on 3 August 1914 sparked Laplasse's entry into military service. He was initially assigned to clerical work.

== Aviation service ==
His civil pilot's license was noted, and he was quickly transferred into aviation service. He earned a military pilot's license on a Morane and was assigned to Escadrille 461. On 22 June 1916, he forced a German airplane into an involuntary landing. In May 1917, he repeated the feat. His distinguished service in Escadrille 461, earned him the Médaille militaire; as the award citation said, he was noted for "...strafing the German trenches and batteries at a low altitude, and returning often with his plane riddled by bullets."

He was "promoted" to flying Nieuport fighters with Escadrille 75, joining the squadron on 20 October 1917. Once the unit re-equipped with Spad XIIIs, he began to score his aerial victories. He downed two German two-seater reconnaissance planes; then, he began the highly hazardous practice of balloon busting.

On 22 August, with four wingmen flying top cover for him, he destroyed three enemy observation balloons. As he attacked a fourth one, a quintet of German Fokker D.VIIs attacked him and sent him down in flames, killing him.

== List of aerial victories ==
See also Aerial victory standards of World War I

Confirmed victories are numbered and listed chronologically. Unconfirmed victories are denoted by "u/c" and may or may not be listed by date.

No.	Date/time	Aircraft	Foe	Result	Location	Notes
u/c	22 June 1916		German airplane	Forced to land		
u/c	May 1917		German airplane	Forced to land		
1	15 December 1915 @ 1125 hours	Spad XIII	German reconnaissance airplane	Destroyed	Saint-Mards	
2	13 March 1918	Spad XIII	German reconnaissance airplane	Destroyed	Septvaux	
3	18 June 1918	Spad XIII	German observation balloon	Destroyed	Moulin-le-Comte	
4	17 August 1918	Spad XIII	German observation balloon	Destroyed	Blerancourt	Victory shared with another French pilot
5	17 August 1918	Spad XIII	German observation balloon	Destroyed	Cuts	
6	22 August 1918	Spad XIII	German observation balloon	Destroyed	Saint-Gobain	
7	22 August 1918	Spad XIII	German observation balloon	Destroyed	Saint-Gobain	
8	22 August 1918	Spad XIII	German observation balloon	Destroyed	Saint-Gobain	Laplasse killed in action shortly thereafter

== Sources of information ==
- Over the Front: A Complete Record of the Fighter Aces and Units of the United States and French Air Services, 1914-1918 Norman L. R. Franks, Frank W. Bailey. Grub Street, 1992. ISBN 0-948817-54-2, ISBN 978-0-948817-54-0.
- SPAD XII/XIII Aces of World War 1: Volume 47 of Aircraft of the Aces: Volume 47 of Osprey Aircraft of the Aces. Jon Guttman. Osprey Publishing, 2002. ISBN 1-84176-316-0, ISBN 978-1-84176-316-3.
