= Escadrille 23 =

French Air Force unit founded in 1914

Escadrille MS 23 - N 23 - SPA 23
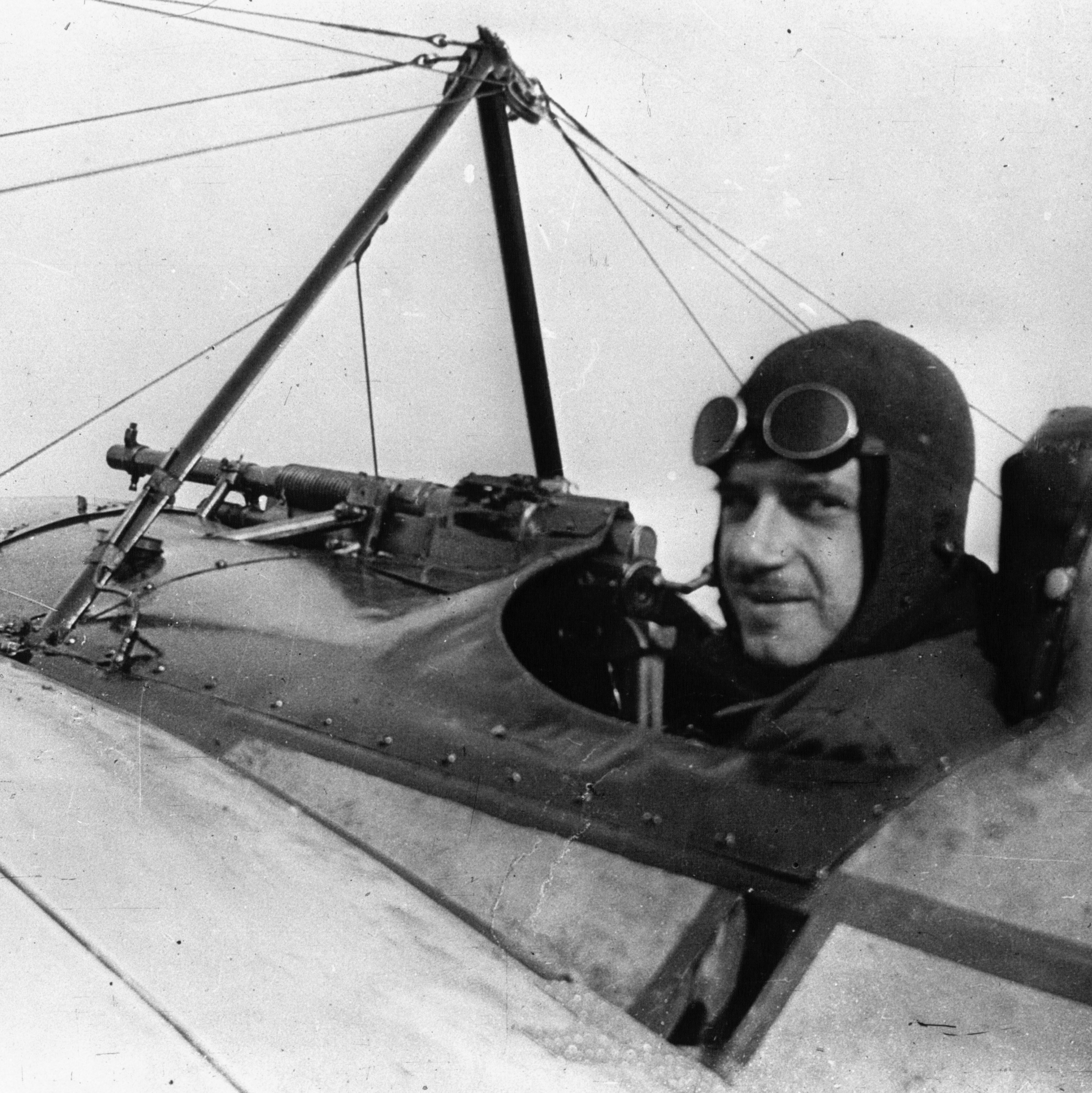
- Ace Eugene Gilbert
- Active: 4 August 1914-
- Country: France
- Branch: French Air Service
- Type: Fighter Squadron
- Engagements: World War I

Commanders
- Notable commanders: Captaine Carl Marie Francois vicomte de Vergnette de Lamotte 1914-1915

Escadrille 23 of the French Air Force was formed at Brie on 4 August 1914.

== History ==
Escadrille 23 was equipped with Morane-Saulniers and forwarded to VI Armee of the French Army in September, and transferred to IV Armee in October 1914. Later that month, it moved to the Somme. It would operate from there until 6 August 1915. It then returned to the VI Armee for a short spell before being posted to IV Armee on 21 August 1915.

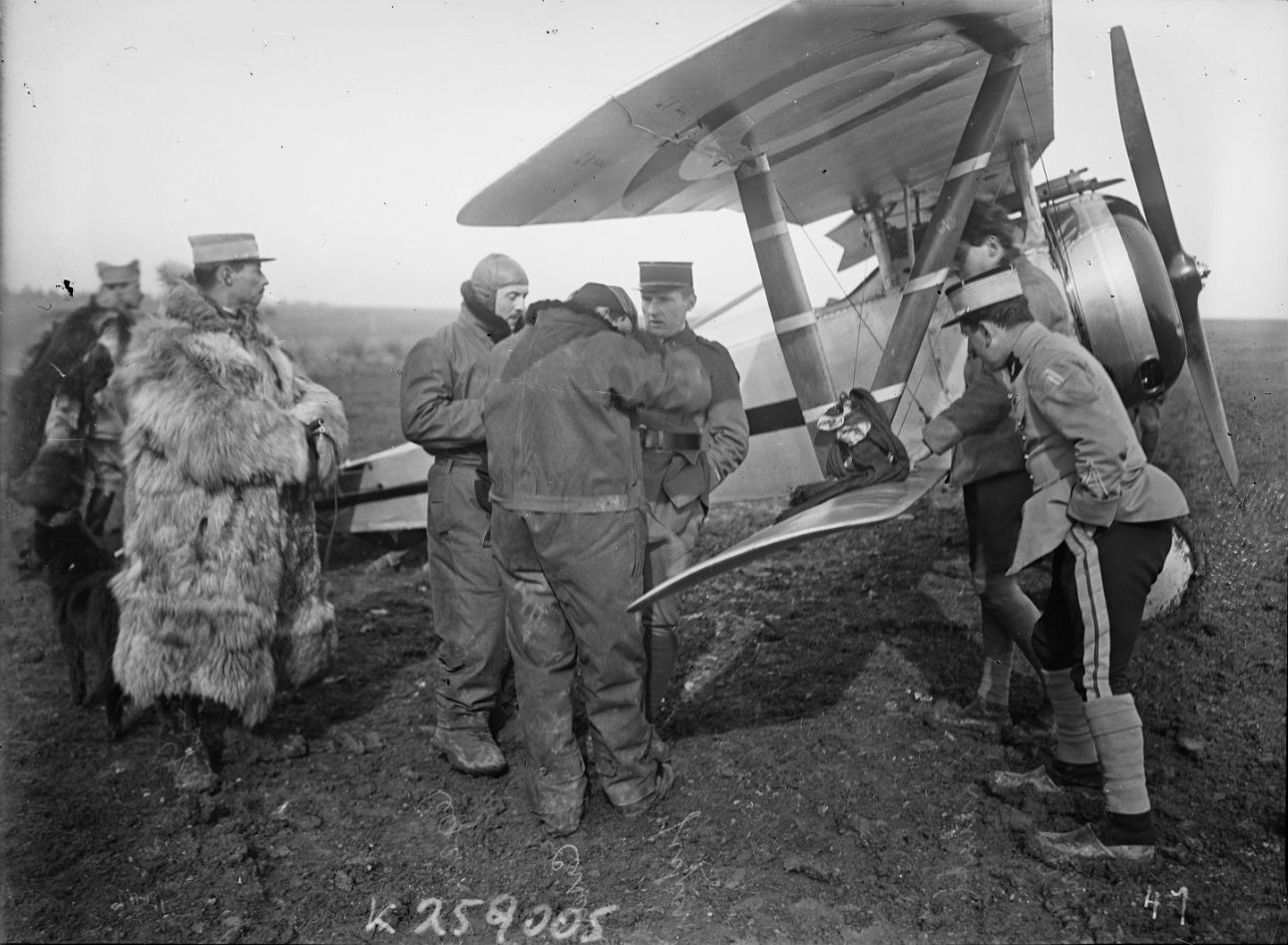
Escadrille N.23 flightline. Note the warm flying gear on the pilots.

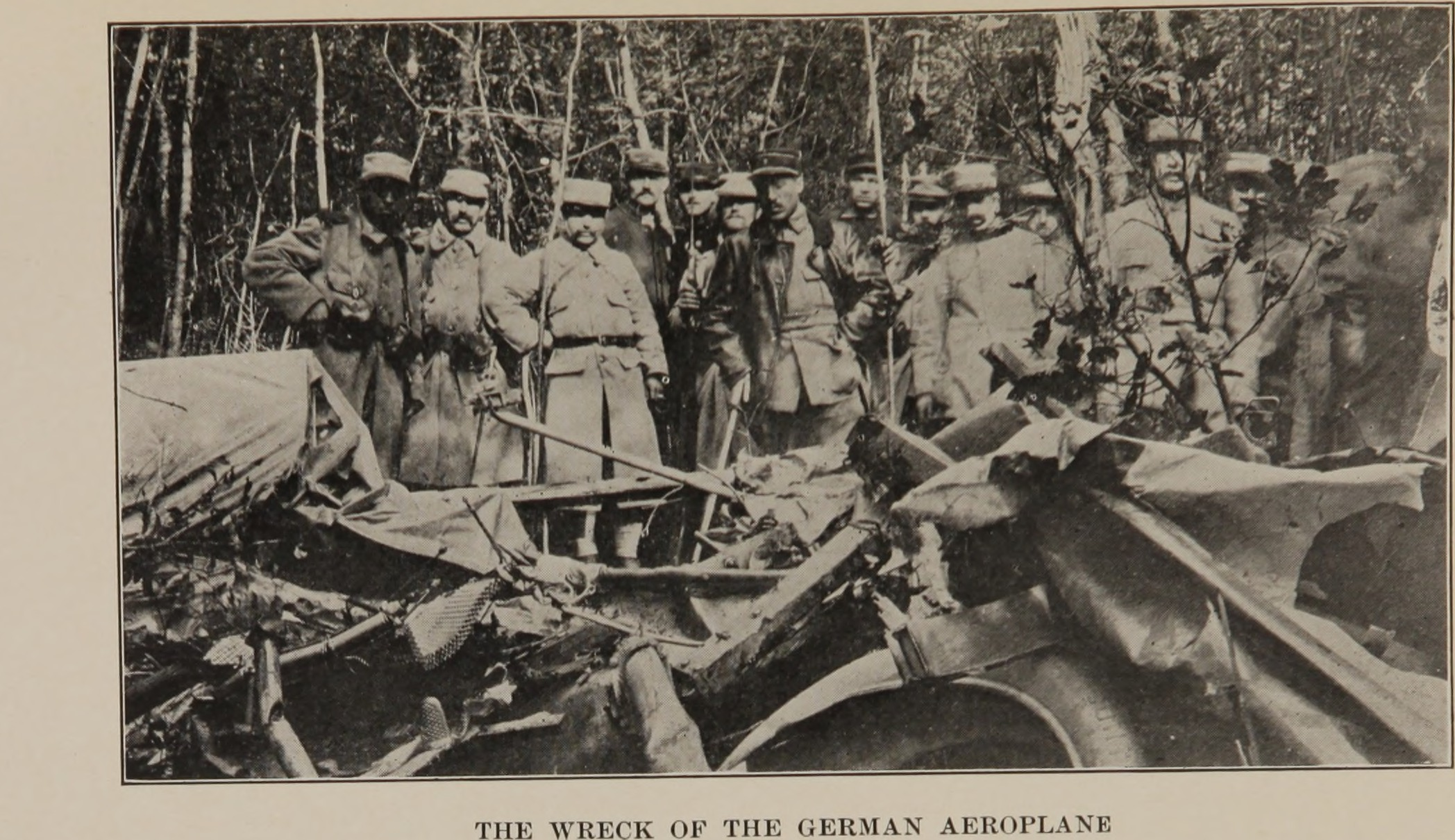
Shot down German plane of FA 2 [Crew Pilot Erich Heuschkel killed; Eberhard Wenck (observer) POW/DOW on 19 August 1917 shot down at Souilly / Vadelaincourt on the way to Bar-le-Duc by the pilot Villiars (N23). Photograph appeared from American Field Service member Lewis Burwell account personal letters from the front

On 20 September 1915, the unit re-equipped with Nieuports and became Escadrille N23. Its performance earned it a citation in orders on 5 November 1916. It was credited with victories over 17 enemy aircraft and four observation balloons. On 3 February 1917, the escadrille was posted to VII Armee; it soon moved to support II Armee. On 19 March 1918, the escadrille earned the fourragere of the Croix de Guerre by being cited again, for downing another 23 enemy airplanes. The unit subsequently retooled with SPAD fighters, but did not change its designation to Escadrille SPA.23 until August 1918. Wartime victories for Escadrille SPA.23 totaled 59 aircraft destroyed.

Escadrille SPA.23 still serves in today's French Air Force.

== Commanding officers ==
- Capitaine Auguste de Reverend: 4 August 1914 - 8 December 1915
- Lieutenant Louis Robert de Beauchamp: 9 December 1915 - KIA 17 December 1916
- Capitaine Pierre de Langle de Cary: 18 December 1916 - September 1917
- Capitaine Armand Pinsard: September 1917 -

== Notable personnel ==
- Capitaine Armand Pinsard
- Adjutant Maxime Lenoir
- Lieutenant Jean Casale
- Lieutenant Eugène Gilbert
- Lieutenant François de Rochechouart

== Aircraft ==
- Morane-Saulnier: 4 August 1914
- Nieuport: 20 September 1915
- SPAD: Summer 1918
