= William Herisson =

French flying ace

William Louis Max Herisson
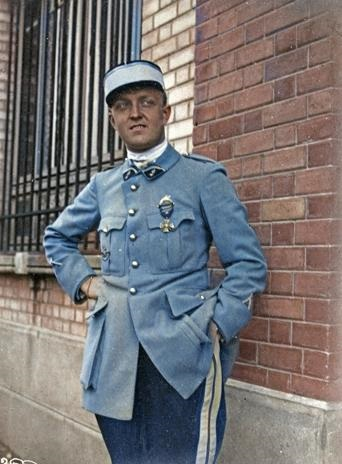
- Coloured photograph of William Hérisson during WW I
- Born: 20 June 1894; Nîmes, France
- Died: 25 December 1969 (aged 75); Nîmes
- Military career
- Allegiance: France
- Branch: Cavalry; aviation
- Rank: Sous lieutenant
- Units: 11e Regiment de Hussards, Escadrille 20, Escadrille 75
- Awards: Légion d'honneur, Médaille militaire, Croix de Guerre with nine palmes and three étoiles de vermeil

Sous Lieutenant William Louis Max Herisson was a French flying ace during World War I. He was credited with eleven confirmed aerial victories.

== Early life ==
William Louis Max Herisson was born in Nîmes on 20 June 1894.

== Military service ==
Herisson entered the French cavalry on 1 September 1914. On 30 November, he was promoted to enlisted Brigadier.

On 6 April 1915, he was promoted again, to Maréchal-des-logis. On 1 September, he entered pilot's training at Étampes. He received his Pilot's Brevet, No. 2069, on 12 December, and was retained on instructor duty until the following August. On 30 August 1916 he reported to Escadrille F20 (the 'F' denoting the Farmans in use in the squadron). However, a week later, he was reporting for upgrade training to Nieuport fighter planes. On 8 December 1916, he joined a Nieuport squadron, Escadrille 75.

On 1 March 1917, he was promoted to Adjutant. The squadron upgraded to Spads, and Herisson began to score. Beginning 22 July 1917, with a win over Verdun, he became an ace in two months, tallying his fifth victory on 25 September, with four of his five wins shared with other French pilots. The Médaille militaire was awarded to him on 18 November 1917.

Herisson next scored on 18 February 1918, again teaming to share a win. On 30 March, he shared his seventh triumph with Gabriel Guerin and another French pilot. He next won a solo victory over a Pfalz D.III on 11 April 1918. Then he shared a win over another German fighter on 21 May. As recognition of his continuing success, he was appointed a Chevalier in the Légion d'honneur on 12 June 1918. He rounded his career as an ace with his only double, on 17 September 1918.
