= Blériot 115 =

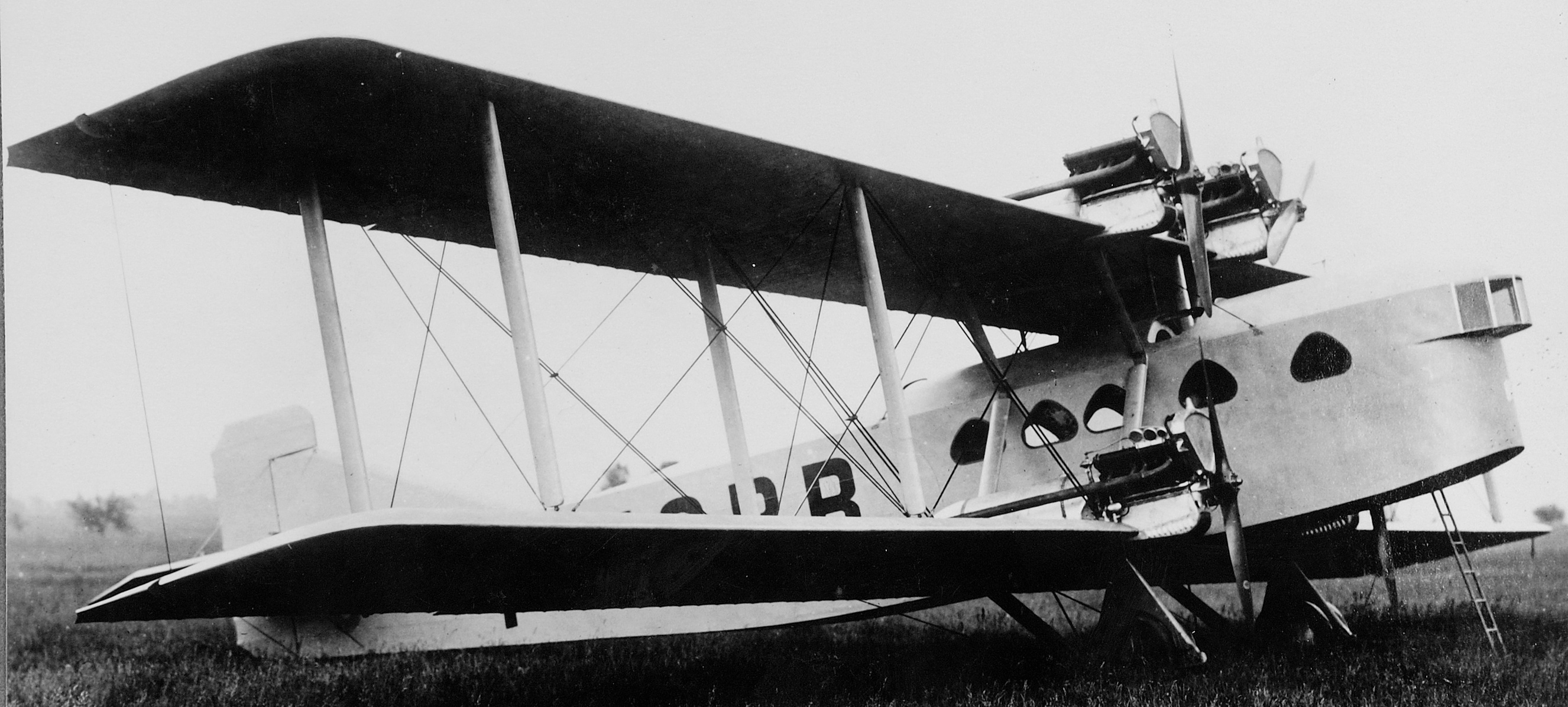
- Blériot 115 prototype

General information
- Type: Airliner
- Manufacturer: Blériot
- Number built: 6

History
- First flight: 9 May 1923

The Blériot Bl-115 was a French biplane airliner of the 1920s, best remembered for the part it played in the French exploration of Africa. For its day, it was a large aircraft, mounting one pair of engines on the upper wing and one pair on the lower. First flying on 9 May 1923, the prototype crashed on 23 June, killing its pilot, Jean Casale.

A refined version of the aircraft, the 115-bis was flown in June 1924.

== Operational; history ==
The third and fourth machines built (christened Roland Garros and Jean Casale) were used in Colonel Louis de Goÿs' attempts to create air routes to Africa. Commanded by Jean Dagnaux, the aviators departed France on 18 January 1925, they arrived in Colomb-Béchar in Algeria, on 28 January. The expedition ended in disaster on 7 February 1925 in Niamey, Niger when the Jean Casale crashed on take-off, killing its radio operator and seriously injuring both pilots, including Dagnaux. They had covered 4,137 km (2,571 mi).

== Variants ==
Blériot Bl-115
Four-engined airliner, powered by 4x 180 hp (130 kW) Hispano-Suiza 8Ac engines.
Blériot Bl-115bis
Improved version of the Blériot Bl-115, powered by 4x 180 hp (130 kW) Hispano-Suiza 8Ab engines.
Bleriot Bl-103
Projected bomber version. Not built.

== Specifications (Bl-115) ==
Data from Jane's all the World's Aircraft 1924, Aviafrance:Bl-115

General characteristics

- Crew: 3
- Capacity: 8 pax
- Length: 14.45 m (47 ft 5 in)
- Wingspan: 25 m (82 ft 0 in)
- Height: 4.96 m (16 ft 3 in)
- Wing area: 126 m^{2} (1,360 sq ft)
- Empty weight: 2,950 kg (6,504 lb)
- Gross weight: 4,900 kg (10,803 lb)
- Fuel capacity: 800 kg (1,800 lb) fuel and oil
- Powerplant: 4 × Hispano-Suiza 8Ac V-8 water-cooled piston engine, 130 kW (180 hp) each
- Propellers: 2-bladed fixed-pitch propeller

Performance

- Maximum speed: 180 km/h (110 mph, 97 kn) at sea level
- Range: 600 km (370 mi, 320 nmi)
- Service ceiling: 6,000 m (20,000 ft)
- Wing loading: 39 kg/m^{2} (8.0 lb/sq ft)
- Power/mass: 0.1088 kW/kg (0.0662 hp/lb)
