= Chargé =

- Commune
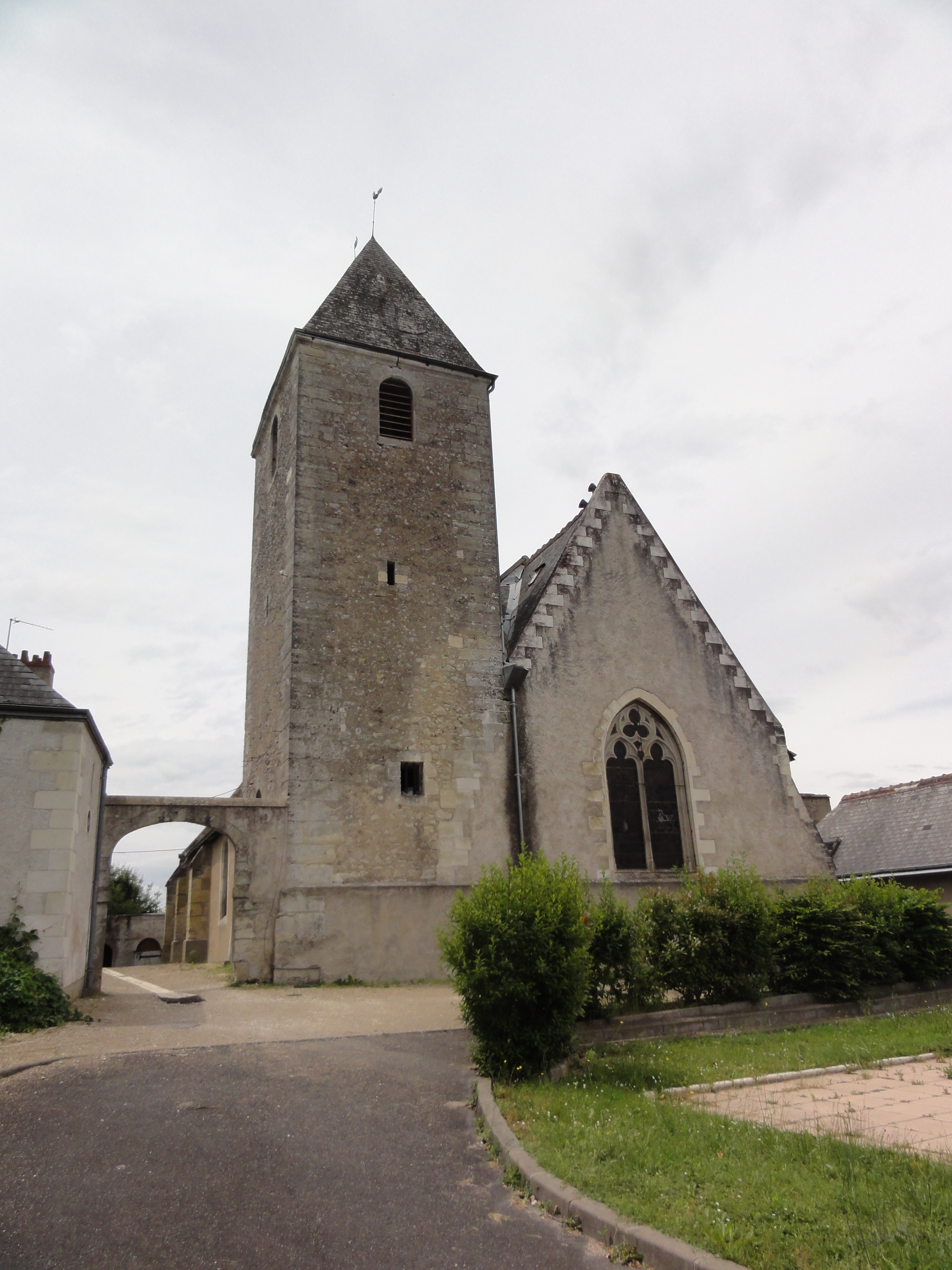
- The church in Chargé
- Location of Chargé
- Location within France Location within Centre-Val de Loire
- Coordinates: 47°25′56″N 1°01′48″E
- Country: France
- Region: Centre-Val de Loire
- Department: Indre-et-Loire
- Arrondissement: Loches
- Canton: Amboise

Government
  - Mayor (2020–2026): Pascal Dupre
- Area^{1}: 22.98 km^{2} (8.87 sq mi)
- Highest elevation: 114 m (374 ft)
- Lowest elevation: 56 m (184 ft)
- Population (2023): 1,359
  - Density: 59.14/km^{2} (153.2/sq mi)
- Time zone: UTC+01:00 (CET)
  - Summer (DST): UTC+02:00 (CEST)
- INSEE/Postal code: 37060 /37530
- ^{1} French Land Register data, which excludes lakes, ponds, glaciers > 1 km^{2} (0.386 sq mi or 247 acres) and river estuaries.

Chargé (French pronunciation: [ʃaʁʒe]) is a commune in the Indre-et-Loire department in central France.

Chargé is a small town near Amboise. The Rock 'in Chargé festival has revitalized the village since 2006.

== Population ==
Historical population
Year	Pop.	±% p.a.
1968	525	—
1975	595	+1.80%
1982	757	+3.50%
1990	862	+1.64%
1999	947	+1.05%
2007	1,053	+1.34%
2012	1,226	+3.09%
2017	1,304	+1.24%
2023	1,359	+0.69%
Source: INSEE

The inhabitants are called Chargéens in French.

== See also ==
- Communes of the Indre-et-Loire department
