= Escadrille 38 =

Escadrille MS 38 / N 38 / SPA 38
- Active: 1915–1918
- Country: France
- Branch: French Air Service
- Type: Fighter Squadron
- Battle honours: Twice cited in orders; awarded the Fourragere of the Croix de Guerre

Escadrille 38, variously known as Escadrille MS38, Escadrille N38, or Escadrille SPA38, was a French fighter squadron founded on 8 January 1915. Fighting until the 11 November 1918 armistice, they were responsible for downing 98 German aircraft in aerial combat.

== History ==
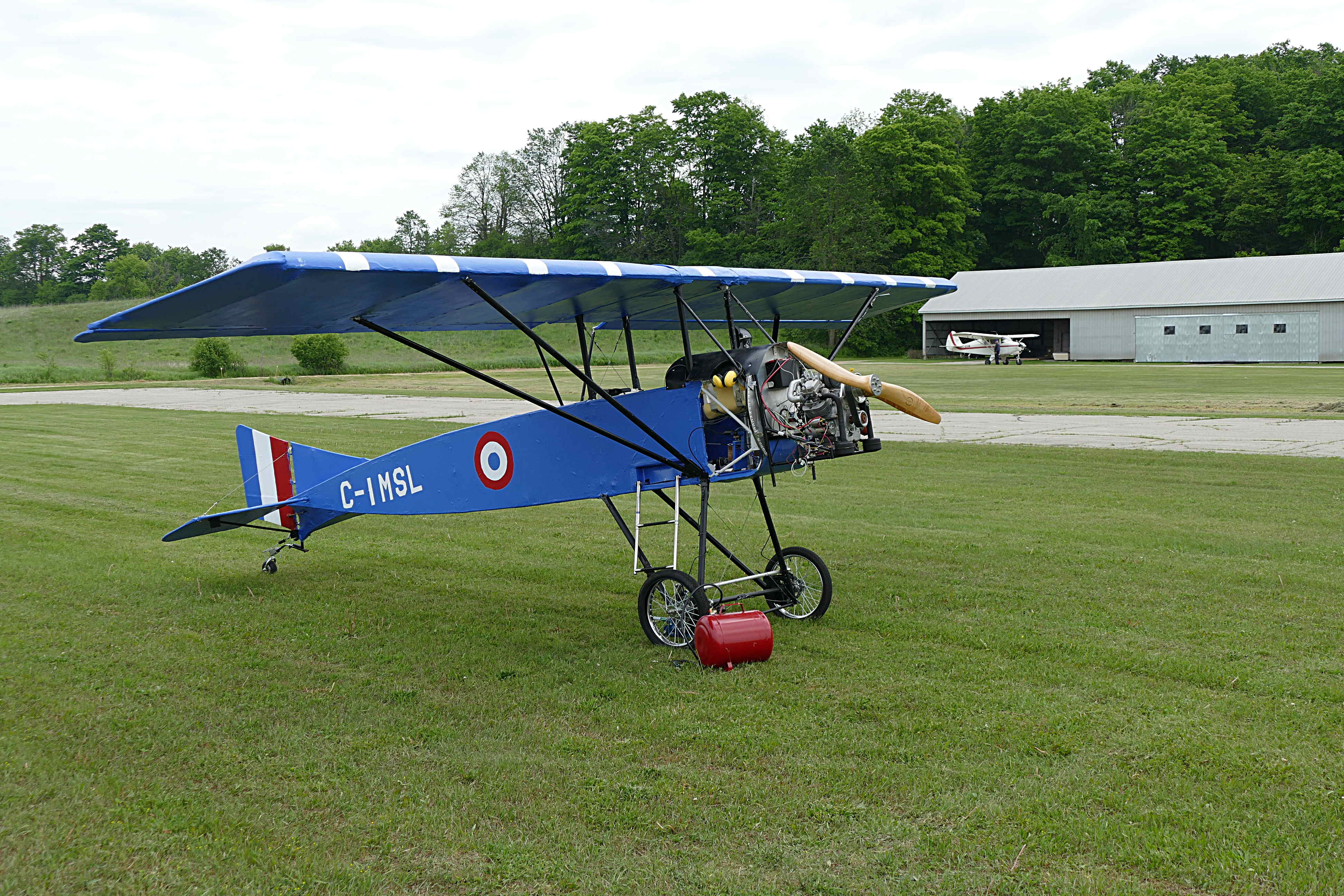
A modern three/fourths scale reproduction of a Morane-Saulnier "Parasol"

Escadrille 38 was founded at Châteaufort, France, as Escadrille MS38 on 8 January 1915. Equipped with two-seat reconnaissance aircraft, it was assigned to support of IV Armee on 5 February 1915. The unit was re-equipped with two seat Nieuport XIIs on 20 September 1915. In accordance with regulations, the squadron was renamed Escadrille N38. In February 1916, they began to be supplied with single-seat fighters.

The squadron was one of four selected to be consolidated into a new wing-level formation, Groupe de Combat 15, on 19 March 1917. On 14 June, the entire unit was cited for having destroyed 28 German aircraft in ten months.

By the Autumn of 1917, the unit had been re-equipped with SPAD VII fighters, and was redesignated Escadrille SPA38. On 29 January 1918, the unit had raised its battle score to 51 German aircraft destroyed. For this feat, the unit was cited, and its members granted the right to wear the Fourragere of the Croix de Guerre. Later in the Spring of 1918, more modern SPAD XIIIs would replace the SPAD VIIs. On 5 June 1918, the escadrille was assigned to a Groupe de Combat commanded by Capitaine Raoul Echard. For the final months of the war, Escadrille 38 bounced about, supporting at various times IV Armee, V Armee, and VI Armee. By the ceasefire, Escadrille 38 had destroyed 98 German aircraft in aerial combat.

== Commanding officers ==
- Lieutenant Max Boucher: 8 January 1915 - February 1916
- Lieutenant Jean d'Harcourt: February 1916 - 10 June 1916
- Capitaine Alphonse Colcomb: 10 June 1916 - 24 March 1918
- Capitaine Georges Madon: 24 March 1918 - ceasefire

== Notable members ==
- Capitaine Georges Madon
- Sous lieutenant Hector Garaud
- Adjutant Gustave Douchy

== Aircraft ==
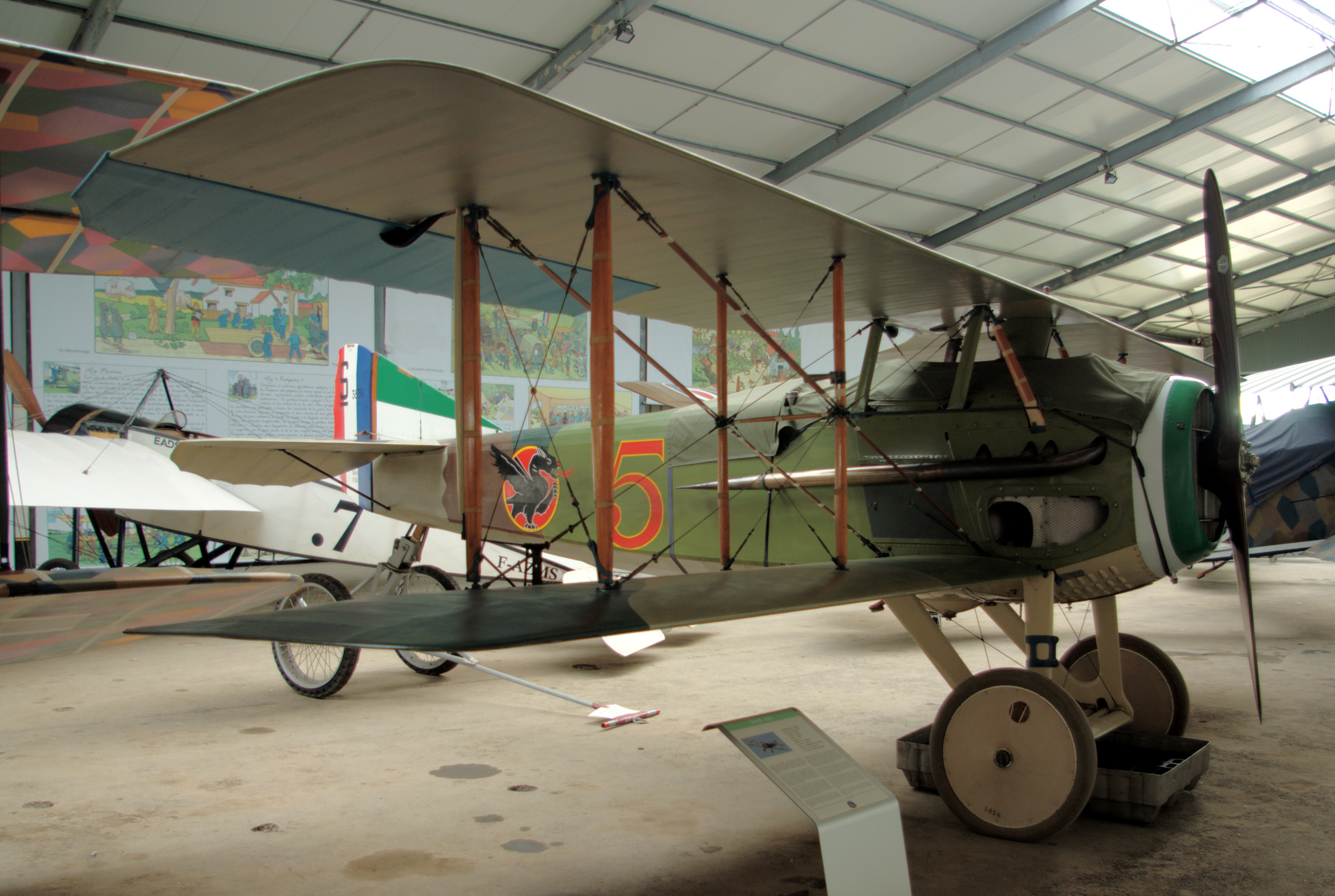
SPAD XIII on display in a museum.

- Morane-Saulnier Parasols: 8 January 1915 - 20 September 1915
- Nieuport 11s: 20 September 1915 - February 1916
- Nieuport 10s: February 1916 - Autumn 1917
- SPAD VIIs: Autumn 1917 - Spring 1918
- SPAD XIIIs: Spring 1918 - 11 November 1918
