= François de Rochechouart =

François Marie Joseph Laurent Victurnien de Rochechouart de Mortemart
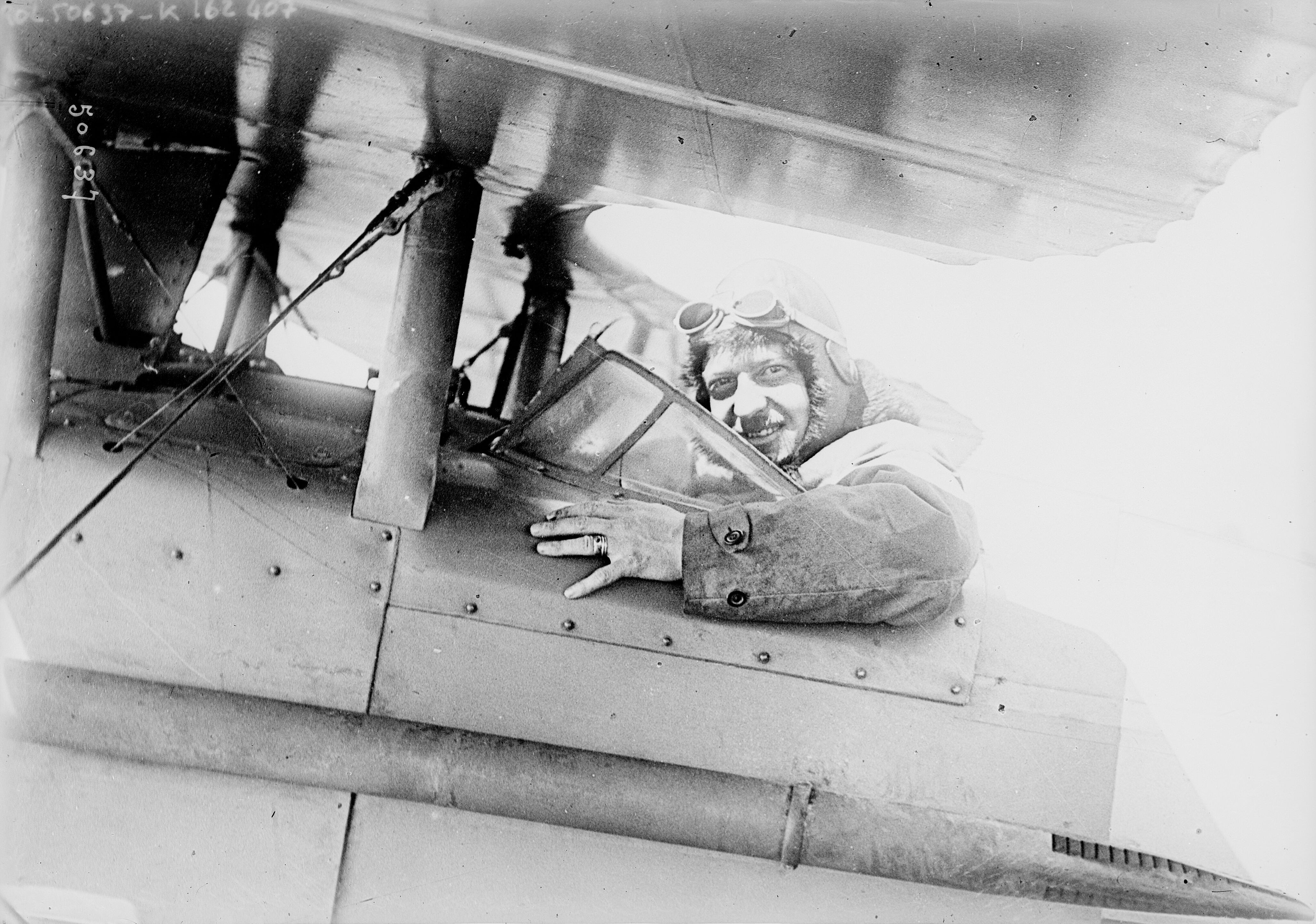
- Born: March 22, 1881; Paris, France
- Died: March 16, 1918 (aged 36); Consenvoye, France
- Burial place: La Croix de l'Aviateur, Liny-devant-Dun, France
- Relatives: Arthur Casimir Victurnien de Rochechouart de Mortemart; Hélène Géraldine Sophie Marie d'Hunolstein; Marguerite Françoise Marie de La Rochefoucauld
- Military career
- Allegiance: France
- Branch: Aviation
- Service years: 1902–1918
- Rank: Sous-Lieutenant
- Unit: Escadrille 23
- Awards: Legion of Honour, Croix de Guerre

Sous-Lieutenant François Marie Joseph Laurent Victurnien de Rochechouart de Mortemart, (22 March 1881 - 16 March 1918), Marquis of Mortemart, Prince of Tonnay-Charente, was a French World War I flying ace credited with seven aerial victories.

== Biography ==
François Marie Joseph Laurent Victurnien de Rochechouart de Mortemart was born on 22 March 1881 in Paris, France. When World War I began, he was serving in the cavalry. He switched to aviation service, and graduated pilot training with his Military Pilot's Brevet on 29 May 1917. Assigned to Escadrille 23, he shot down seven German airplanes between 16 June 1917 and 19 February 1918. He was killed in action on 16 March 1918 over Consenvoye, France.

== Honors and awards ==
Chevalier de la Légion d'Honneur
"Pilot of escadrille N23, an excellent pilot who has demonstrated in his pursuit escadrille the great qualities of bravery and audacity. He has distinguished himself in many combats by his skill, resolution and disregard for danger. On 20 October 1917, he downed his fifth enemy plane during the course of a very difficult combat in which he was wounded. Four citations." Légion d'Honneur citation, 22 November 1917.

Additionally, he had won the Croix de Guerre with seven or more palms.
