= Escadrille Spa.97 =

Escadrille MS 38 / N 38 / SPA 38
- Active: 1917–1918
- Country: France
- Branch: French Air Service
- Type: Fighter Squadron
- Battle honours: Cited in orders

Escadrille Spa.97 was a French fighter squadron active during the World War I years of 1917 and 1918. It was credited with destroying 17 enemy airplanes and eight observation balloons.

== History ==
Existing Detachments N511 and N519 within II Armee became the basis for Escadrille Spa.97. Organized in June 1917 with Nieuport XXIVs, it was originally denoted as Escadrille N97.

Transferred from II Armee to IV Armee in July, it re-equipped with fresh Nieuport XXIVs in August. It was Cited in orders on 30 September 1917. Then it was shifted back to supporting II Armee. Its new commanding officer began its refitting with SPAD VII and SPAD XIII fighters. This was completed by 8 December 1918. The new brand of airplane drove a change of unit designation to Escadrille Spa.97.

On 10 December 1917, the squadron was one of those incorporated into Groupe de Combat 15. In February 1918, Groupe de Combat 15 was in turn joined other units in Escadre de Combat No. 1. At about the same time, the SPAD VIIs were dropped from the squadron rolls and the SPAD XIIIs retained.

On 4 October 1918, the Escadre (including Escadrille Spa.97) was Cited in orders. By the 11 November 1918 ceasefire, the squadron was credited with the destruction of 17 German airplanes and eight observation balloons.

Since 2012, SPA 97 has formed part of Escadron de Chasse 2/30 Normandie-Niemen.

== Commanders ==
- Capitaine Francois de Castel: June 1917
- Lieutenant Herve Conneau: October 1917
- Lieutenant Joseph Guertiau: 3 October 1918 – 11 November 1918

== Aircraft ==
- Nieuport XXIV fighters: June 1917 – December 1917
- SPAD VII fighters: 8 December 1917 – February 1918
- SPAD XIII fighters: 8 December 1917 – 11 November 1918
