= Escadrille Spa.152 =

- Active: 1917–1918
- Country: France
- Branch: French Air Service
- Type: Fighter Squadron

Escadrille Spa.152 (originally Escadrille N.152) was a French fighter squadron active 1917 through 1918 during World War I. It was credited with destruction of 15 German airplanes, 27 observation balloons, and a Zeppelin.

== History ==
Escadrille Spa.152 was formed under VII Armee auspices at Lyon-Bron, France on 9 July 1917. As a Nieuport fighter squadron, it was designated Escadrille N.152. In May 1918, the squadron refitted with SPAD fighters, and was renamed Escadrille Spa.152. On 4 June 1918, it was incorporated into a makeshift unit that became Groupe de Combat 22 on 1 July 1918. The Groupe was shifted about in its combat operations between three French field armies as the war ground down to its 11 November 1918 ceasefire. Final aerial victory credits for the squadron came to destruction of 15 enemy airplanes, 27 observation balloons, and a Zeppelin.

== Commanding officers ==
- Lieutenant Charles Lefevre: 9 July 1917 - 20 November 1917
- Lieutenant Louis Delrieu: 20 November 1917 - 19 August 1918
- Capitaine L. Bonne: 19 August 1918 - Armistice

== Notable members ==
- Lieutenant Léon Bourjade
- Sous lieutenant Ernest Maunoury

== Aircraft ==
- Nieuport fighters: 9 July 1917 - May 1918
- SPAD fighters: May 1918 onwards
