= Escadrille Spa.86 =

Escadrille N86 / Spa86
- Active: 1917–1918
- Country: France
- Branch: French Air Service
- Type: Fighter Squadron
- Battle honours: Cited in orders

Escadrille Spa.86 was a French Air Force fighter squadron active from 6 April 1917 through the end of World War I. They served as a component of Groupe de Combat 14, and were Cited in orders on 28 October 1918 for having downed 30 German aircraft. It operated mainly on the Western Front, flying Nieuport and later SPAD aircraft, and achieved 30 confirmed victories. The unit was cited in orders for its combat performance and included several notable French aces.

== History ==
Escadrille Spa.86 was formed as Escadrille N86 because it was originally outfitted with Nieuport airplanes, although it had a few SPADs. Founded 6 April 1917 at Vélizy – Villacoublay Air Base, France, it was immediately incorporated into Groupe de Combat 14 (Combat Group 14, or GC14).

GC14 began its operations with VI Armee. On 10 May 1917, GC14 was transferred to II Armee on 29 June 1917. GC14 would be shifted three more times, late that year—to VI Armee on 11 October, to III Armee on 20 November, and to VI Armee eight days later.

By early 1918, the squadron had gone all SPAD and was redesignated as Escadrille Spa.86. It remained part of GC14. The groupe moved to III Armee on 24 March 1918 for a week, back to VI Armee, then attached to the Royal Air Force Third Brigade on 15 April. It spent May in Flanders. On 1 June 1918, GC14 was posted to X Armee. On 9 October 1918, GC 14 moved to 1er Armee. That was their last posting, as the Armistice of 11 November 1918 ended hostilities.

On 28 October 1918, Escadrille Spa.86 was cited in orders for having destroyed 30 German aircraft.

== Commanding officers ==
- Capitaine Andre Brault: 6 April 1917
- Lieutenant Etienne Thieriz: 27 April 1917
- Lieutenant Antoine d'Aboville: 24 October 1918

== Notable members ==
Colonel Henri Hay De Slade

== Aircraft ==
- Nieuport fighters: 6 April 1917 until early 1918
- SPAD fighters: From 6 April 1917 on
