= Georges Madon =

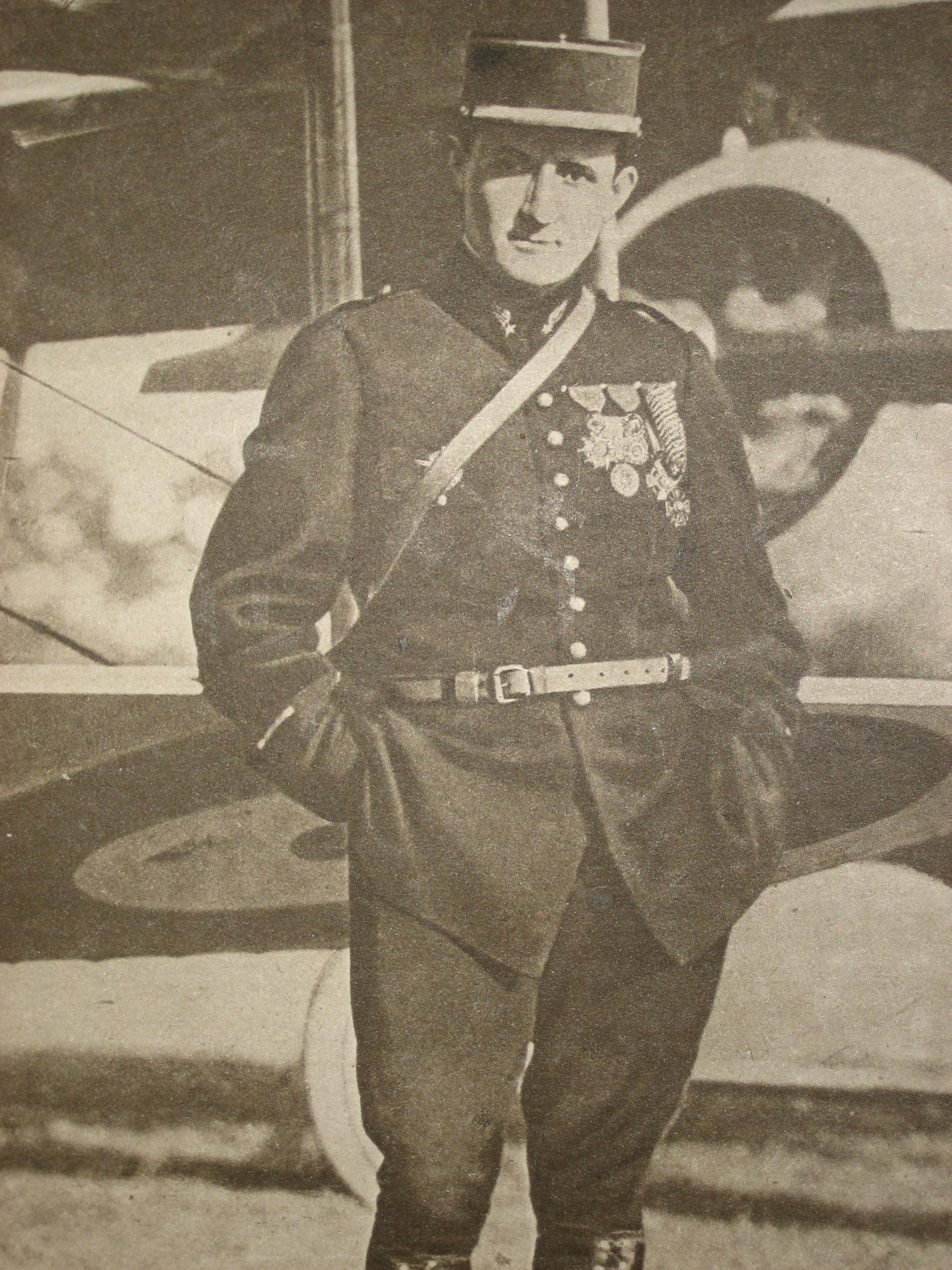
- Born: 28 July 1892; Bizerte, Tunisia
- Died: 11 November 1924 (aged 32); Tunis, Tunisia
- Military career
- Allegiance: France
- Branch: Engineers, flying service
- Service years: 1912–1924
- Rank: Captain
- Unit: BL30, MF218, N38, Spa38
- Commands: Spa38
- Awards: Legion d'Honneur, Medaille Militaire, Croix de Guerre
- Other work: Air racer

Georges Félix Madon (28 July 1892 – 11 November 1924) was the fourth-ranked French ace pilot of the First World War. His lengthy career and wide variety of aviation experiences were remarkable.

== Early years ==
Madon was born in Bizerte, Tunisia, and was athletic from an early age. He was short but had exceptional strength and posture. He boxed and played football.

Madon first became interested in aviation at the age of 15, when he made an unsuccessful attempt to build his own craft. He had quit school to get over an attack of malaria. After building models and kites, he fabricated his own bicycle-powered "aviette".

His desire to fly led him to attempt to become a pilot for the Ottoman Empire. When that failed, he enlisted in the First Engineering Regiment in Versailles and ended up as a cook. He repeatedly requested pilot's training.

== Aerial service ==
He ultimately qualified as a pilot in June 1911, after 19 lessons. On 12 March 1912, he enlisted in the French military and received his military pilot's license at Avord, France, in January 1913. Although only a corporal, he was one of France's most experienced military pilots. He originally flew reconnaissance and night-time bombing missions while assigned to fly prewar Bleriots with Escadrille (squadron) BL30. The night flying missions were some of the first performed, and his experience probably accounted for this assignment. That experience would also save his life, when on 30 October 1914, his engine was destroyed by a direct hit from 77mm cannon fire. It took exceptional skill to coax the Bleriot to a dead stick landing against the wind within French lines.

In April 1915, thrown off course by heavy fog, Madon flew into Swiss air space while qualifying upon a new 80 horsepower (60 kW) Farman, and was interned for several months. It took him two tries to escape, but he freed himself in December by chloroforming and kidnapping his guard. His reward was a court-martial and 60 days confinement.

He was then posted to Escadrille MF218 as a sergeant directing artillery fire. He requested transfer to a fighter squadron.

After retraining at Pau and Cazaux, he was posted to fly Nieuport 17s with N38 on 1 September 1916. He scored his first victory on the 28th. By the year's end, he was up to four and had been promoted to adjutant.

Madon began the new year by strafing an enemy locomotive to a halt. Later, on 2 July 1917, he was wounded in action when he collided with an enemy aircraft and crashed. By then, he had 12 victories. The following month, he was commissioned a sub-lieutenant. By October, his confirmed score was 17, with 20 unconfirmed. He was said to have returned with blood and brains on his plane's propeller three times; another time, he brought home the glasses from an enemy observer's face stuck in his plane's wire bracing.

By March 1918, his personal score stood at 25 confirmed. He was appointed to command Escadrille Spa38, which was re-equipped with new SPAD XIIIs. Although principally a photo reconnaissance unit, Spa38 aggressively defended itself. They lived up to the motto they adopted from their commander: "Whoever rubs against me gets pricked". They also adopted his black thistle insignia on their planes.

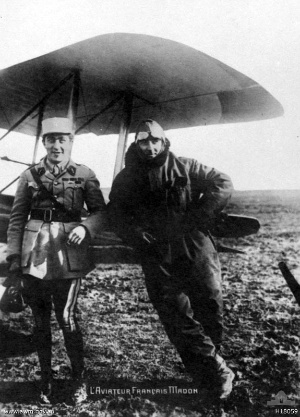
Madon leaning against a SPAD.

As part of Madon's new role, he mentored other pilots who became aces because of his tutelage; among these were Andre Martenot de Cordou, Hector Garaud, and American David Putnam.

By war's end, he was credited with 41 confirmed victories and 64 probables. About the latter, he once nonchalantly remarked: "The Boche knows his losses." His score of 41 still ranked him fourth among all French pilots.

In an ironic twist, he was promoted to temporary captain on the last day of the war, Armistice Day, 1918. In an era when fighter aces' careers were commonly measured in months, he had had a two-year string of victories. With seven years of flying experience, he was one of the world's most experienced aviators by the war's end.

== Later years ==
Madon stayed in aviation after the war ended. In 1922, he flew a radically designed racing monoplane scheduled for the Coupe-Deutsch Race. The Simplex monoplane had a 320 horsepower (240 kW) Hispano-Suiza engine crammed into a short fuselage; pilot view was seriously limited by a rearward seating behind a barrel radiator. Madon crashed the plane during a test flight and suffered severe injuries.

Precisely six years after Armistice Day, at age 32, Madon was killed in his native Tunisia preparing for a tribute to fellow airman Roland Garros. His aircraft suffered mechanical trouble, and he gallantly crashed it into the roof of a villa rather than hit spectators. He died in Tunis.

== Legacy ==
Madon's legacy is founded on more than his experienced long service to his country and his long rise through military ranks. His score sheet included an incredible 64 probable victories. Confirmation of any sizable number of these might raise him to a score even greater than that of Manfred von Richthofen, the Red Baron himself.

Madon was awarded three medals by his own country: Médaille Militaire, Chevalier de la Légion d'honneur, and Croix de Guerre with ten palms. He also was awarded the Italian Order for Valor, and the Romanian Order for Valor.

The Avord Air Base, where he learned to fly, is named "Base Aérienne 702 Capitaine Georges Madon".

== Citations for decorations ==
According to the Ministry of Defense's biography on George Felix Madon:

"Georges Felix Madon, Lieutenant temporary (active) engineer, pilot aviator, officer elite fighter pilot of an indomitable energy, heroic bravery and supreme skill. Also winner in the ordinary course of committed countless battles without concern of many opponents, or the removal of our lines, never reached even a single bullet through the devastating speed of his attacks, the precision of his maneuvers, the infallibility of his marksmanship, wounded sometimes in terrible falls, leads tirelessly by his splendid example, the squadron under his command and it shows every day with new exploits. On 11 August 1918, he destroyed his 40th enemy plane. One injury. Chevalier de la Légion d'honneur for war. Nineteen citations. "
