= Escadrille Spa.96 =

French fighter squadron

- Active: 1917–1918
- Country: France
- Branch: French Air Service
- Type: Fighter Squadron

Escadrille Spa.96 (originally Escadrille N.96), was a French fighter squadron active during the World War I years of 1917 to 1918. They were an integral part of larger, more potent fighting formations for most of their existence. The squadron was credited with destroying 15 German airplanes and two observation balloons during the war.

== History ==
Escadrille Spa.96 (originally Escadrille N.96) was founded drawing upon previously existing Detachment de Chasse 510. Established in II Armee during June 1917, the squadron was equipped with Nieuport fighters and dubbed Escadrille N.96. It shifted operations on 9 July 1917 to IV Armee, then on 22 July to V Armee. In February 1918, it and three other squadrons were incorporated into Groupe de Combat 19. At the same time, it refitted with SPAD fighters, changing the unit designation to Escadrille Spa.96.

Escadrille Spa.96 would be part of Groupe de Combat 19 until war's end. In fact, the Groupe would be one of several such further massed into Escadre de Combat No. 1. On 8 September 1918, the Escadre was tasked to the U.S. First Army for the Battle of Saint-Mihiel. On 4 October, Escadrille Spa.96, along with the rest of the Escadre, was Mentioned in dispatches. By war's end, Escadrille 96 was credited with the destruction of 15 German airplanes and two observation balloons.

== Commanding officers ==
- Capitaine Masse: June 1917 - 25 September 1917
- Capitaine Eugene Verdon: 25 September 1917 - 6 January 1918
- Lieutenant Maurice Barthe: 6 January 1918 - missing in action 6 May 1918
- Lieutenant Charles Lefevre: 6 January 1918 - wounded in action 29 August 1918
- Lieutenant Pierre Fauquet-Lemaitre: 29 August 1918 - 11 November 1918

== Aircraft ==
- Nieuport fighters: June 1917 - February 1918
- SPAD fighters: February 1918 onwards
