= Escadrille Spa.75 =

- Active: 1916–1918
- Country: France
- Branch: French Air Service
- Type: Fighter Squadron
- Battle honours: Mentioned in dispatches

Escadrille Spa.75 (originally Escadrille N.75) was a French fighter squadron active during World War I. Beginning 12 April 1917, they became part of Groupe de Combat 14, and fought as such until the 11 November 1918 ceasefire. The escadrille was Mentioned in dispatches for having shot down 29 German airplanes and two observation balloons.

== History ==
Escadrille Spa.75 was founded as Escadrille N.75 on 13 July 1916; its initial designation stemmed from it being fitted with Nieuport XIII airplanes. It supported the VIII Armee until 12 April 1917, at which time it refitted with SPAD S.7s, was renamed Escadrille Spa.75, and was amalgamated into Groupe de Combat 14. The squadron would fight as part of the Groupe for the rest of World War I.

Groupe de Combat 14 would support several different French field armies in several different locations, including Flanders from 4 May to 1 June 1918.

Postwar, on 23 December 1918, the squadron was Mentioned in dispatches for having destroyed 29 German airplanes and two observation balloons.

== Commanding officers ==
- Capitaine Henri de Montfort: 16 July 1916 - 22 December 1917
- Lieutenant Pierre Blandinieres: 22 December 1917 - 11 November 1918

== Notable members ==
- Sous lieutenant William Herisson
- Adjutant Antoine Laplasse

== Aircraft ==
- Nieuport XIII: 16 July 1916
- SPAD S.7: from 12 April 1917
