= Escadrille Spa.561 =

French World War II fighter squadron

- Active: 1915–1918
- Country: France
- Branch: French Air Service
- Type: Fighter Squadron

Escadrille Spa.561 (also variously known as Escadrille N.92/I, Escadrille N.392, Escadrille N.561) was a French First World War fighter squadron dedicated to defending Venice, Italy, from aerial attack. Stemming from a six plane detachment assigned to Venice's defense on 15 August 1915, after its foundation in June 1916, Escadrille Spa. 561 would defend Venice until 1 January 1918. Detached then to support the French X Armee during its sojourn in Italy, the squadron remained on the peninsula after the X Armee had returned to France. By war's end, Escadrille Spa.561 was credited with destroying 12 enemy aircraft and four observation balloons.

== History ==
This unit was created in Lyon on 13 August 1915 under the name Escadrille N.92/I; the unit's designation denotes a Nieuport airplane inventory and the I stands for Italie. The squadron was posted at Mestre, Italy on 15 August 1915 for the defense of Venice. Its original inventory was six aircraft. In December 1915, the unit relocated to Lido; moving nearer Venice made it easier to defend it. In June 1916, it was redesignated as Escadrille N.392.

By the beginning of 1917, the escadrille had 18 airplanes on hand. On 1 July 1917, the squadron was renumbered Escadrille N.561. On 1 January 1918, the squadron was attached to X Armee for their Italian operations. After X Armee returned to France, Escadrille N.561 remained in Italy, though at reduced strength. In April 1918, it had 10 Nieuports.

It can be inferred that by some date after April 1918, the squadron had re-equipped with SPADs, as it ended the war as Escadrille Spa.561. Whatever the unit's name or aircraft, by war's' end it was credited with destruction of 12 enemy aircraft, as well as four observation balloons shot down.

== Commanding officers ==
- Capitaine de Challeronge: 15 August 1915 - war's end

== Notable members ==
- Sergeant André Robert Lévy

== Aircraft ==
- Nieuports?: 15 August 1915
- Nieuports: June 1916
- Early 1917 inventory:
  - Sixteen Nieuports
  - One SPAD
  - One Sopwith
- Ten Nieuports: April 1918
- SPADs: After April 1918
