= André Martenot de Cordoux =

French World War I pilot

- Born: Henri-Marie-André-Jean Martenot de Cordoux; 14 March 1893; Chalezeule, France
- Died: 29 December 1991 (aged 98); Paris, France
- Military career
- Allegiance: France
- Branch: Infantry; aviation
- Rank: Sous lieutenant
- Units: Escadrille C.28; Escadrille C.56; Detachment N.513; Escadrille N.94
- Awards: Légion d'honneur Médaille militaire Croix de Guerre; Croix de Guerre (Belgium)

Sous lieutenant Henri-Marie-André-Jean Martenot de Cordoux (14 March 1893 – 29 December 1991) was a French World War I flying ace credited with eight aerial victories.

== Biography ==
Martenot de Cordoux was born in 1893 in Chalezeule, France.

He began his military service on 8 August 1914 as an infantryman. On 5 August 1915, he transferred to aviation duty to begin pilot training. He received his Military Pilot's Brevet on 26 December 1915. After further training, he was posted to Escadrille C.28 on 14 April 1916 to fly Caudrons. On 20 May 1916, despite flying a reconnaissance machine, he shot down a German recon plane. He was severely wounded in the combat.

On 24 March 1917, he was posted to another Caudron squadron, thence to a fighter detachment that became Escadrille N.94. Now flying a Nieuport fighter, Martenot de Cordou shot down a German Rumpler on 25 July 1917 for his second victory.

A temporary promotion to Sous lieutenant raised him to officer status on 25 January 1918. Newly outfitted with a SPAD fighter, between 1 April and 13 September 1918, he downed six more German airplanes.

== See also ==
- Aerial victory standards of World War I
