= Escadrille Spa.159 =

Escadrille N159 / Spa159
- Active: 1918
- Country: France
- Branch: French Air Service
- Type: Fighter Squadron
- Engagements: World War I

Escadrille Spa.159 was a French fighter squadron supporting VIII Armee during 1918. It was credited with destroying 11 German airplanes and an observation balloon.

== History ==
Escadrille Spa.159 (original designation Escadrille N.159) began on 16 January 1918 with a draft of personnel from Escadrille N.90. Assigned to VIII Armee, they were incorporated into Groupe de Combat 20 in late February. In May, it replaced its Nieuport fighters with SPAD XIIIs; its unit designation was altered to Escadrille Spa.159.

Escadrille Spa.159 saw combat at the Battle of Saint-Mihiel. By war's end, the squadron had been credited with destroying 11 German airplanes and an observation balloon.

== Commanders ==
- Lieutenant Albert Roper: 16 January 1918
- Lieutenant Georges Mazimann: 22 June 1918 - killed in action 20 July 1918
- Lieutenant Henri Hay De Slade: 28 July 1918 - 11 November 1918

== Notable member ==
- Lieutenant Henri Hay De Slade

== Aircraft ==
- Nieuport fighters: 16 January 1918
- SPAD XIII fighters: late February 1918.
