= Escadrille Spa.80 =

Escadrille N80 / SPA80
- Active: 1916–1918
- Country: France
- Branch: French Air Service
- Type: Fighter Squadron

Escadrille Spa80 was a French fighter squadron active during World War I, from 13 December 1916 to 11 November 1918. It was credited with 23 aerial victories.

== History ==
Originally created at Lyon-Bron, France on 13 December 1916 as Escadrille N80 because it was equipped with Nieuport XVII fighters, it was attached to V Armee. On 17 March 1917, the squadron became part of Groupe de Combat 14. Groupe de Combat 14 would support X Armee beginning 10 May 1917. On 5 July, they were transferred to II Armee. On 11 October 1917, they were transferred to VI Armee. Within a week, they were refitted with SPAD fighters, changing their unit designation to Escadrille Spa80.

The Groupe de Combat would support the British Royal Air Force's 3rd Brigade beginning 15 April 1918. From 5 May 1918 until war's end, the Groupe returned to supporting French units. Escadrille Spa80 ended World War I credited with aerial victories over 21 German airplanes and two observation balloons.

== Commanding officers ==
- Capitaine Francoise Glaize: 13 December 1916
- Lieutenant Paul Ferrand: 18 October 1917

== Notable members ==
- Sous lieutenant Robert Delannoy

== Aircraft ==
- Nieuport XVII: 13 December 1916
- SPAD XIII: c. 18 October 1917
