= Achille Rousseaux =

Achille Justin Ernest Rousseaux
- Born: August 29, 1887; Dijon, France
- Died: 1928
- Military career
- Allegiance: France
- Branch: Aviation
- Rank: Adjutant
- Units: Escadrille C46; Escadrille N.79; Escadrille N.88
- Awards: Médaille militaire Croix de Guerre

Adjutant Achille Justin Ernest Rousseaux was a French World War I flying ace credited with six aerial victories.

== Biography ==
See also Aerial victory standards of World War I

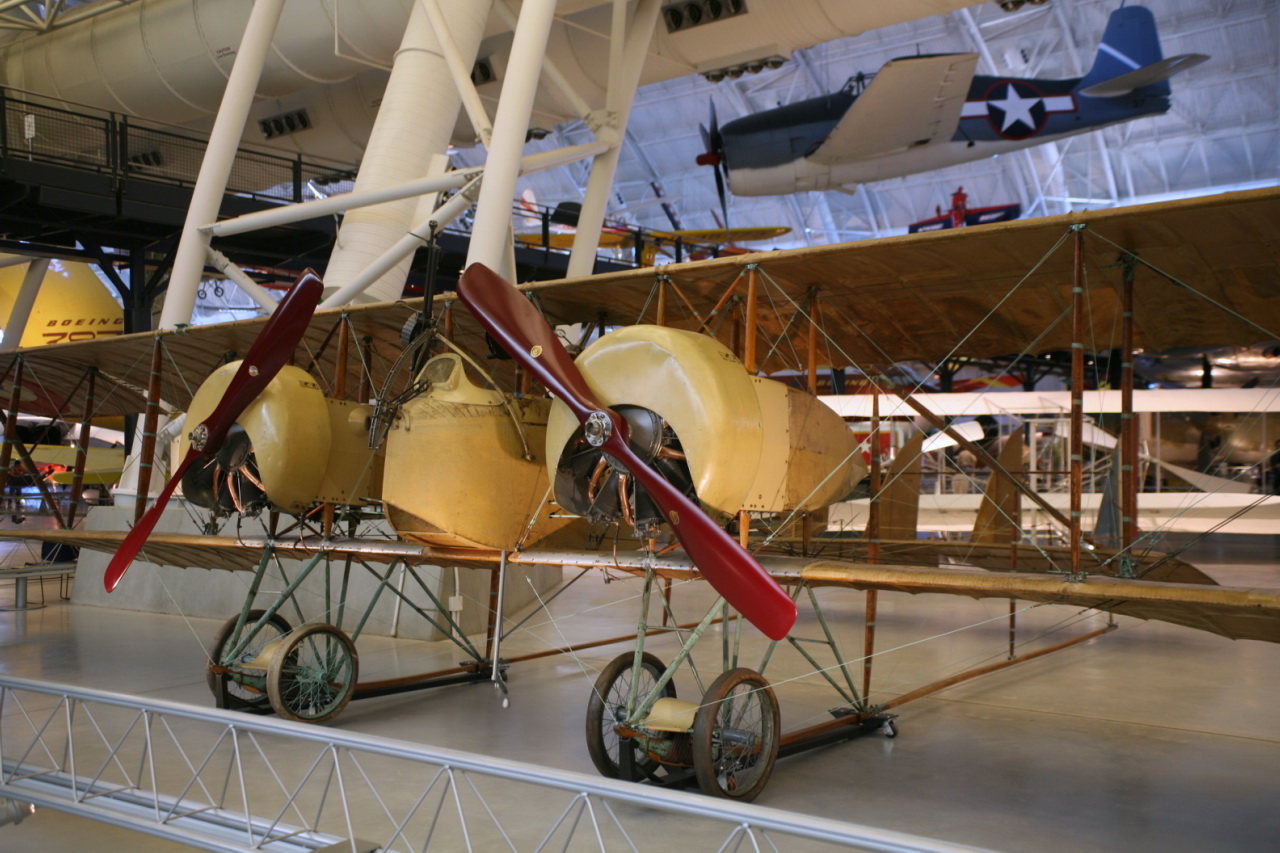
A museum displayed Caudron G.4. Rousseaux flew this Caudron variant, or one very like it.

Achille Justin Ernest Rousseaux was born in Dijon, France on 29 August 1887.

He was a cavalryman before his switch to aviation service. Details of his training are unavailable, but he was assigned as a Caudron bomber pilot. He shared his first aerial victory, on 8 September 1916, in conjunction with Jean Loste, Louis Martin, and three other pilots. In November, while cooperating with Marie Vitalis and Didier Lecour Grandmaison, among others, he was credited with downing a German Roland, an Albatros, and an Aviatik.

Rousseaux was wounded in the right arm while gaining his fourth victory, on 23 November 1916. He would not score another victory until 14 April 1917. On 1 October 1916, he was posted to a Nieuport fighter squadron, Escadrille N.79, only to be moved to another fighter unit, Escadrille N.88, two days later. Rousseaux scored his sixth and final win piloting a Nieuport fighter on 2 December 1917.

On 25 January 1918, he was promoted to Adjutant. On 20 February 1918, he was withdrawn from combat, and disappears from history.

== Awards ==
Médaille Militaire
"Brigadier machine-gunner of Escadrille C46. Excellent gunner, very courageous and adroit. On 16 November 1916, during the course of an aerial combat, he downed his adversary bringing therewith the number of enemy planes he had shot down to three. On 23 November he was attacked successively by groups of three or four German planes; he opposed them with remarkable resistance even after having his right arm hit by a bullet. He returned with his plane very badly damaged." Médaille Militaire citation, 2 December 1916

He also won the Croix de guerre 1914–1918 (France).
