= List of aerial victories of Heinrich Gontermann =

List of aerial victories of Heinrich Gontermann

Heinrich Gontermann was a German fighter ace during World War I. He was credited with 17 confirmed aerial victories flying with Jagdstaffel 5 before being appointed to command Jagdstaffel 15. While leading this fighter squadron, he shot down a further 22 enemy aircraft. As one of the few pilots daring enough to undertake the highly hazardous assaults on opposing observation balloons, he destroyed 18 of them. Included in this victory list was the notable and unique feat of downing four balloons in three minutes on 19 August 1917.

As the primary arena for aerial combat on the Western Front was over the German trenches and rear works, German aerial and ground observers could usually verify German victories in considerable detail. Aviation historians cited have further researched the war's victory claims, using archives from all sides.

Confirmed victories in this list are numbered and listed chronologically.

This list is complete for entries, though obviously not for all details. Abbreviations from sources utilized were expanded by editor creating this list. Sources: Norman Franks, Frank Bailey, Russell Guest (1993). Above the Lines: The Aces and Fighter Units of the German Air Service, Naval Air Service and Flanders Marine Corps, 1914–1918. Grub Street Publishing, London. ISBN 0-948817-73-9, ISBN 978-0-948817-73-1, p. 116; Franks, Bailey, and Guest (1992), Over the Front: A Complete Record of the Fighter Aces and Units of the United States and French Air Services, 1914-1918, Grub Street Publishing, London, ISBN 978-0-948817-54-0, p. 183, as well as The Aerodrome's webpage on Gontermann

No.	Date	Time	Foe	Squadron	Location	Notes
1	14 November 1916	1630 hours	Royal Aircraft Factory FE.2b		Morval, France	
2	6 March 1917	1315 hours	Royal Aircraft Factory FE.2b	No. 57 Squadron RFC	South of Mory, France	
3	11 March 1917	1245 hours	Royal Aircraft Factory FE.2b		South of Bapaume, France	
4	17 March 1917	1430 hours	Royal Aircraft Factory FE.2b		St. Pierre, France	
5	24 March 1917	0855 hours	Sopwith 1½ Strutter	No. 70 Squadron RFC	Oisy-le-Verge	
6	25 March 1917	0925 hours	Sopwith 1½ Strutter	No. 70 Squadron RFC	Haplincourt, France	
7	6 April 1917	0815 hours	Royal Aircraft Factory FE.2b	No. 18 Squadron RFC	Neuville, France	
8	8 April 1917		Observation balloon	41 Compagnie, Service Aéronautique	West of Saint Quentin, France	French observation balloon
9	13 April 1917	0905 hours	Royal Aircraft Factory FE.2d	No. 57 Squadron RFC	Vitry, France	
10	13 April 1917	1940 hours	Observation balloon	55 Compagnie, Service Aéronautique	Southeast of Saint Quentin, France	French observation balloon
11	14 April 1917		Royal Aircraft Factory BE.2c	No. 52 Squadron RFC	Metz-en-Couture, France	
12	16 April 1917	1650 hours	Observation balloon	14th Section, 14th Company, 4th Balloon Wing	Étricourt-Manancourt, France	British observation balloon
13	16 April 1917	1700 hours	Observation balloon	6th Section, 15th Company, 4th Balloon Wing	Étricourt-Manancourt, France	British observation balloon
14	22 April 1917	0930 hours	Observation balloon	33rd Section, 11th Company, 3rd Balloon Wing	Arras, France	British observation balloon
Unconfirmed	22 April 1917		Observation balloon		Arras, France	British observation balloon
15	23 April 1917	1925 hours	Royal Aircraft Factory RE.8	No. 12 Squadron RFC	Southeast of Arras, France	
16	24 April 1917	0900 hours	Sopwith Triplane	No. 8 Naval Squadron, RNAS	Bailleul, France	
17	26 April 1917s	1150 hours	Observation balloon	8th Section, 1st Company, 1st Balloon Wing	Near Arras, France	British observation balloon
18	4 May 1917		SPAD		Southeast of Caronne	
19	10 May 1917	1230 hours	SPAD		Berry-au-Bac, France	Ace Didier Lecour Grandmaison killed in action
20	10 May 1917	1820 hours	Caudron R.4	Escadrille C46, Service Aéronautique	Berry-au-Bac, France	
21	11 May 1917	1030 hours	SPAD		Berry-au-Bac, France	
22	24 June 1917	1515 hours	Observation balloon	65 Compagnie, Service Aéronautique	Pontavert, France	French observation balloon
23	27 June 1917	1200 hours	Observation balloon	51 Compagnie, Service Aéronautique	Southeast of Reims, France	French observation balloon
24	16 July 1917	1400 hours	Observation balloon		South of Reims, France	French observation balloon
25	24 July 1017	0945 hours	SPAD		Staudecken	
26	5 August 1917	1940 hours	Nieuport		Southwest of Staudecken	
27	9 August 1917		Observation balloon	46 Compagnie, Service Aéronautique	Foret de Hesse	French observation balloon
28	9 August 1917		Observation balloon	51 Compagnie, Service Aéronautique	Foret de Hesse	French observation balloon
29	17 August 1917	1205 hours	Observation balloon	28 Compagnie, Service Aéronautique	Aisne	French observation balloon
30	17 August 1917	1205 hours	Observation balloon	39 Compagnie, Service Aéronautique	Aisne	French observation balloon
31	19 August 1917	1040 hours	SPAD		Southwest of Jouy, France	
32	19 August 1917	1923 hours	Observation balloon		South of Aisne-Tal	
33	19 August 1917	1924 hours	Observation balloon		South of Aisne-Tal	
34	19 August 1917	1924 hours	Observation balloon		South of Aisne-Tal	
35	19 August 1917	1926 hours	Observation balloon		South of Aisne-Tal	
36	15 September 1917	0720 hours	Caudron		Cerny, Essonne, France	
37	30 September 1917	1145 hours	SPAD		Staudecken	
38	30 September 1917	1250 hours	Caudron R.11		Northeast of La Fere, France	
39	2 October 1917	1335 hours	SPAD		Laon, France	
