= Léon Vitalis =

Léon Marie Gaston Fulerand Leon Vitalis
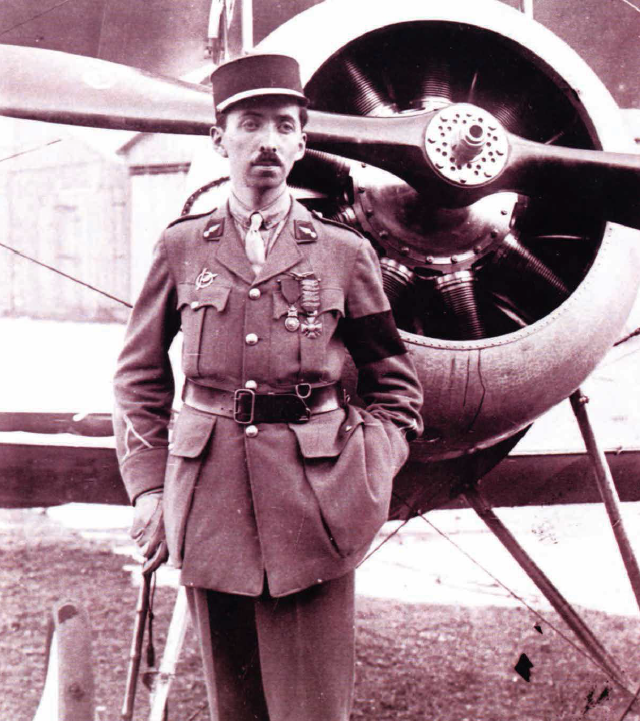
- Born: 15 February 1890; Lodève, France
- Died: 17 August 1941 (aged 51); Lodève, France
- Military career
- Allegiance: France
- Branch: Aviation
- Service years: 1916–1918
- Rank: Adjudant chef
- Units: Escadrille 67, Escadrille 46
- Awards: Légion d'honneur, Médaille militaire, Croix de Guerre

Adjudant Chef Léon Marie Gaston Fulerand Leon Vitalis was a World War I flying ace credited with seven aerial victories, most of which as the machine gunner of his superior, Captain Didier Le Cour Grandmaison. After the war, he founded the Association des aces de 14-18, which aimed to bring together for an annual meal the pilots and gunners mentioned in the army press release (an honour reserved for those who had won five aerial victories, the threshold to become an ace ).

== Biography ==
=== Youth ===
Vitalis was born on February 15, 1890, in Lodève, France, to a wealthy family. His father was a fabric manufacturer and his grandfather, also named Léon (1826-1879), was a centre-right deputy. After a one-year suspension for his studies, he did his military service at the age of 21 and was incorporated on October 2, 1911, in the 7th cuirassier regiment as a simple private. His level of education allowed him to rise in the ranks quickly and he was made a brigadier on April 2, 1912. In September 1912, Vitalis was sent home due to a heart defect detected during his service. He was provisionally discharged before a commission ruled the following year that this malformation made him unfit for any military service.

=== World War I ===
Despite his heart condition, Vitalis succeeded in enlisting as a major on February 10, 1916. He choose to serve in the air force, which had less restrictive physical requirements. He was sent to the aerial shooting school of Cazaux to become a gunner. Less than two months later, he graduated and was assigned on April 4, 1916 at the N.67 squadron where he carried out several missions in the Verdun sector as a gunner on a two-seater Nieuport 10. His first victory was on April 28, 1916, when he shot down a Fokker Eindecker which fell 200 meters from the French lines.

Vitalis acquired a reputation as a good marksman at the front, which allowed him, on 21 May 1916, to integrate (at his request) into the C.46 squadron. This experimental unit is the first to be equipped with Caudrons R.4, heavily armed three-seater twin-engine aircraft. Vitalis quickly became one of the two regular machine gunners of his unit commander, Captain Didier le Cour Grandmaison. The squadron quickly won its first victories in the Somme, with relatively few losses, especially with regard to the strategies employed: to compensate for the lack of maneuverability of the large twin-engines. The C.46 pilots let the German fighters get closer before their machine gunners riddled them with bullets. The Caudrons rarely returned without bullet damage.

Vitalis found this strategy a good way to exercise his shooting skills and won his second aerial victory on 15 July 1916, by forcing an LVG C to land. A third victory, over an Eindecker, followed on 6 September 1916, which earned Vitalis the award of the military medal. He won three more before the end of the year: an LVG on 20 October, a Roland on 10 November and an Albatross on 15 November. Two days after this sixth victory, the new ace was mentioned in the press release to the armies and acquired national fame through the media coverage of the aces' victories in the major newspapers.

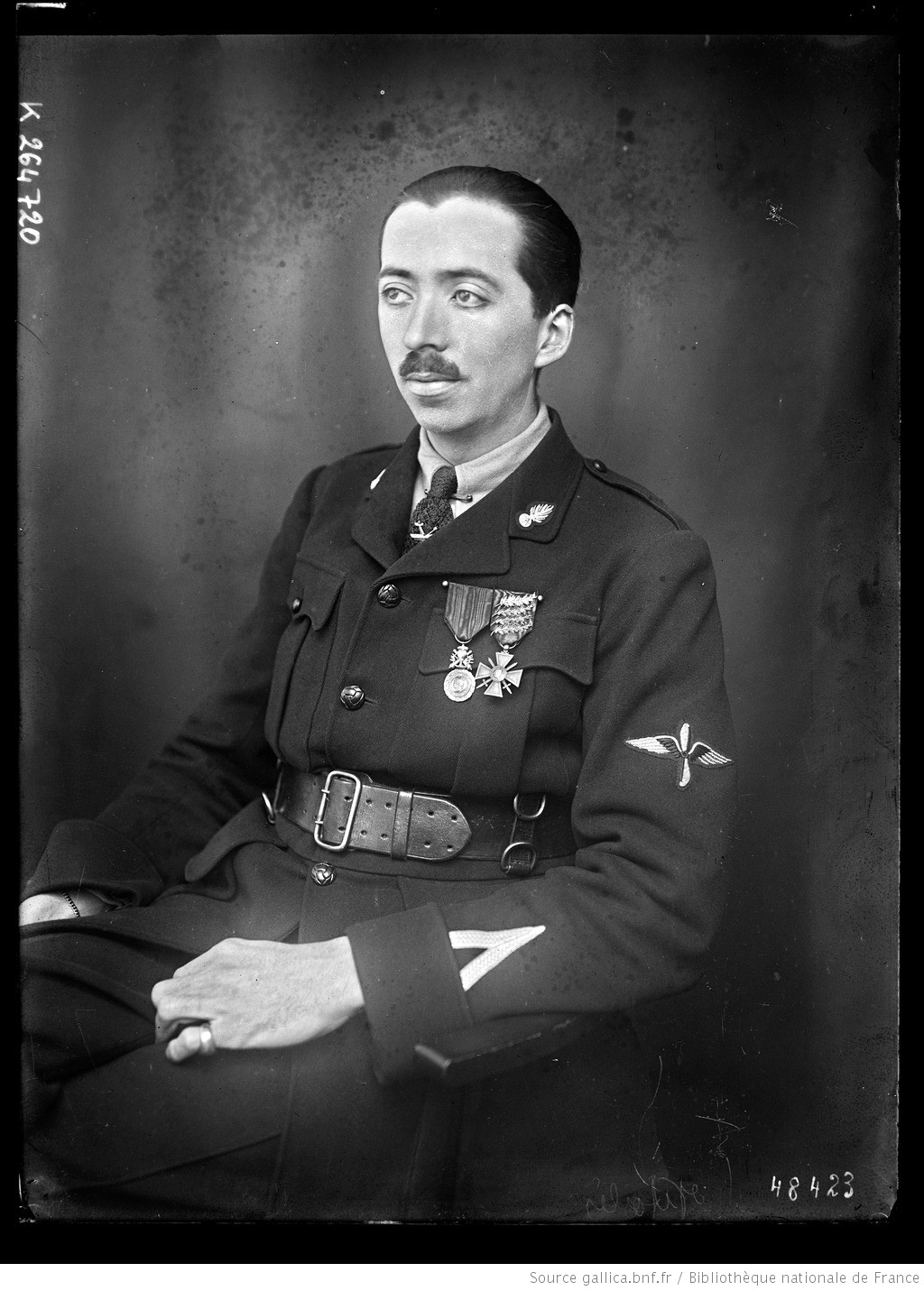
Press photo by Léon Vitalis

Vitalis spent the end of 1916 resting, like the rest of the C.46 squadron, after its good results in the Somme. He returned to the Cazaux shooting school, this time as an instructor, for two weeks.

In April 1917, Vitalis returned to the front with his squadron, to an area where the fighting was much fiercer: the Chemin des Dames 4. April 14, he won his seventh and last approved victory, on a plane piloted by Captain Le Cour Grandmaison 4, who was killed a little less than a month later by the German ace Heinrich Gontermann.

Vitalis was overtaken by his health problems a few months after his return to the front. His heart problems, coupled with nervous exhaustion, led to his evacuation to the VR 75 hospital in Viry-Châtillon, on 28 July 1917. He left in August but remained in Paris for a long convalescence.

On 10 November 1917, Vitalis wrote to his superiors and offered to be assigned to the Cazaux base as a shooting instructor, which he was granted. It was there he was decorated with the Knight's Cross of the Legion of Honor on 27 December 1917. Vitalis returned to the front in 1918 and won a probable victory on May 21. At the end of October, he joined a new experimental squadron, supposed to be equipped with Hanriot HD.3 4 two-seater fighters. The H.174 squadron, however, was not operational before the signing of the Armistice.

== After the war ==
Vitalis was demobilized on 14 August 1919, at the request of his family, so he could take over the management of the family drapery business and its 350 workers. He retired to Lodève but ended up settling shortly afterwards in the Loiret at the head of his own business. He remained in the army reserve, first assigned to the 4th cuirassier regiment, then to the Cazaux shooting school, with the rank of lieutenant from October 1924. He was also promoted to Officer of the Legion of Honor in 1928, then to Commander in 1935. Vitalis also founded the Association of aces of 14-18, which every year brought together all the pilots and gunners mentioned in the press release to the armies.

His heart problems persisted, and in 1931 his superiors reserved him for an instructor position in case of war. Vitalis was finally removed from the executives permanently at his request in 1936, due to tachycardia.

He was not mobilized in 1939. After the German invasion of France, Vitalis left Loiret to seek refuge in his hometown of Lodève, in the free zone. He died on 17 August 1941, aged 51.

== Bibliography ==
- Franks, Norman L. R.; Bailey, Frank W. (1992). Over the Front: A Complete Record of the Fighter Aces and Units of the United States and French Air Services, 1914-1918. Grub Street. ISBN 9780948817540. - Total pages: 228
- Méchin, David (December 1, 2021). The WWI French Aces Encyclopedia: Volume 8. Aeronaut Books. ISBN 9781953201379. - Total pages: 196
