= Escadrille C46 =

Escadrille C46 / R46 / LET46 / C46
- Active: 1915–1918
- Country: France
- Branch: French Air Service
- Type: Reconnaissance/Bomber Squadron
- Battle honours: Cited four times in orders; Awarded the Fourragere of the Croix de Guerre; Awarded the Fourragere of the Médaille militaire

Escadrille 46 (variously known as Escadrille R46 and Escadrille Let46) was a highly decorated French World War bombing squadron. Although serving ordinarily as a reconnaissance and bombardment role, they also flew as gunships to escort bombing missions. The squadron was credited with destroying 37 German aircraft.

== History ==
Escadrille 46 ("small squadron 46") was founded in March 1915 with twin-engine three-seated Caudrons, hence Escadrille C46. Originally attached to VI Armee, the squadron was posted to the II Armee in September 1915.

The squadron flew their Caudron G.IV bombers during the Battle of Verdun, which kicked off on 21 February 1916. In June it refitted with Caudron R.IVs; their unit designation changed to Escadrille R.46. Then, beginning 1 July, while attached to VI Armee, it fought in the Battle of the Somme as it eventuated.

On 15 January 1917, the unit won its first citation while still with VI Armee. Despite flying bombers, they had shot down 15 German aircraft. Two months later, they would trade their Caudrons for Letord Let.1 Type 1s. Their unit designation was altered to Escadrille Let 46.

When the Battle of the Aisne began in April 1917, Escadrille Let 46 was attached to Felix Brocard's Groupe de Combat 12 for the fight. When their commanding officer, Didier Lecour Grandmaison, his replacement, Marcel Bloch led it as it re-equipped again, this time with Caudron R.XI three seated bombers. The unit designation reverted to Escadrille C46 on 17 February 1918. The squadron operated as part of Groupe de Combat 15 in the Champagne region until 14 May 1918.

Then, for the last months of the war, the squadron was bundled along with other squadrons into ever-larger makeshift aviation units. On 12 September 1918, while fighting in the 1er Armee sector, it was awarded its second citation for valor, earning the escadrille the right to the Fourragere of the Croix de Guerre. Ten days later, it was posted to support of the American 1st Army at Battle of Saint-Mihiel. On 23 September 1918, the escadrille was assigned to fly as gunships to protect bombing missions, as the Caudron R.XIs mounted five machine guns apiece. On 28 September, it was granted a third citation.

Escadrille 46 ended World War I credited with 37 enemy aircraft destroyed. They would receive a fourth citation postwar, on 4 February 1919. This citation entitled the unit to display the Fourragere of the Médaille Militaire.

== Commanding officers ==
- Capitaine Legardeur: March 1915
- Lieutenant Didier Lecour Grandmaison: February 1916 - killed in action 10 May 1917
- Capitaine Marcel Bloch
- Lieutenant Resel: October 1918

== Notable members ==
- Lieutenant Didier Lecour Grandmaison
- Lieutenant Jean Loste
- Adjutant-chef Marie Vitalis

== Aircraft ==
- Twin engine three place Caudrons: March 1915
- Caudron G.IIIs
- Caudron G.IVs
- Caudron R.IVs: First flown in June 1916
- Letord Let.1: Supplied in March 1917
- Caudron R.XIs
