= Caudron R.6 =

Reconnaissance aircraft

R.6

General information
- Type: Reconnaissance aircraft
- Manufacturer: Caudron
- Designer: Paul Deville
- Number built: 750

The Caudron R.6 was a French reconnaissance aircraft of World War I. It was a scaled-down version of the Caudron R.4. It eliminated the R.4's nose-gunner and used smaller engines (Le Rhônes of 82 kW). Some 750 of these aircraft were built, three times the production of the original R.4 design.

== Operators ==
France

== Specifications ==
General characteristics

- Crew: Two
- Powerplant: 2 × rotary , 82 kW (110 hp) each

Performance
