= Caudron G.3 =

1910s French military trainer aircraft

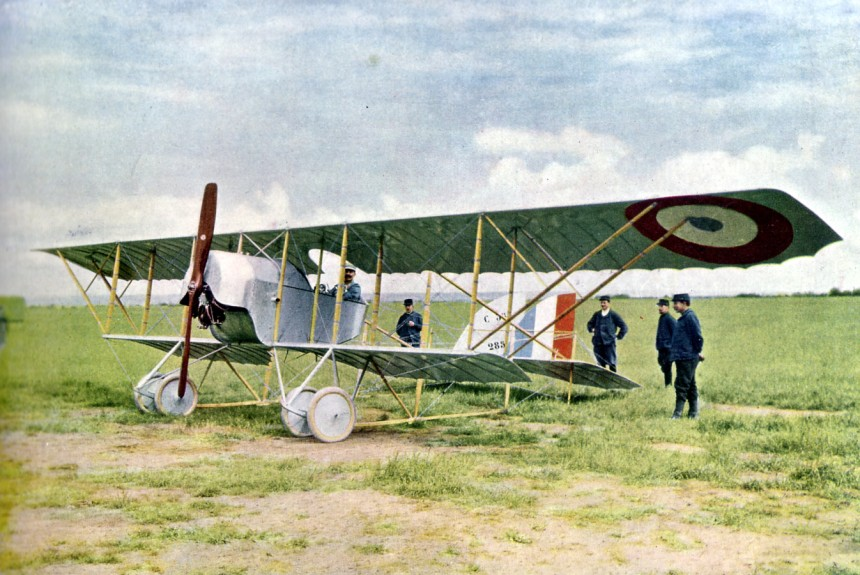
- French Caudron G.3

General information
- Type: Reconnaissance aircraft
- Manufacturer: Caudron
- Primary users: Aéronautique Militaire US Army Air Service; Finnish Air Force; Polish Air Force

History
- Introduction date: 1914
- First flight: Late 1913
- Developed from: Caudron G.2

The Caudron G.3 was a single-engined French sesquiplane built by Caudron, widely used in World War I as a reconnaissance aircraft and trainer.

== Development ==
The Caudron G.3 was designed by René and Gaston Caudron as a development of their earlier Caudron G.2 for military use. It first flew in May 1914 at their Le Crotoy aerodrome.

The aircraft had a short crew nacelle, with a single engine in the nose of the nacelle, and an open tailboom truss. It was of sesquiplane layout, and used wing warping for lateral control, although this was replaced by conventional ailerons fitted on the upper wing in late production aircraft. Usually, the G.3 was not armed, although sometimes light machine guns and small bombs were fitted.

It was ordered in large quantities following the outbreak of the First World War with the Caudron factories building 1423 of the 2450 built in France. 233 were also built in England and 166 built in Italy along with several other countries. The Caudron brothers did not charge a licensing fee for the design, as an act of patriotism.

It was followed in production by the Caudron G.4, which was a twin-engined development.

== Operational history ==
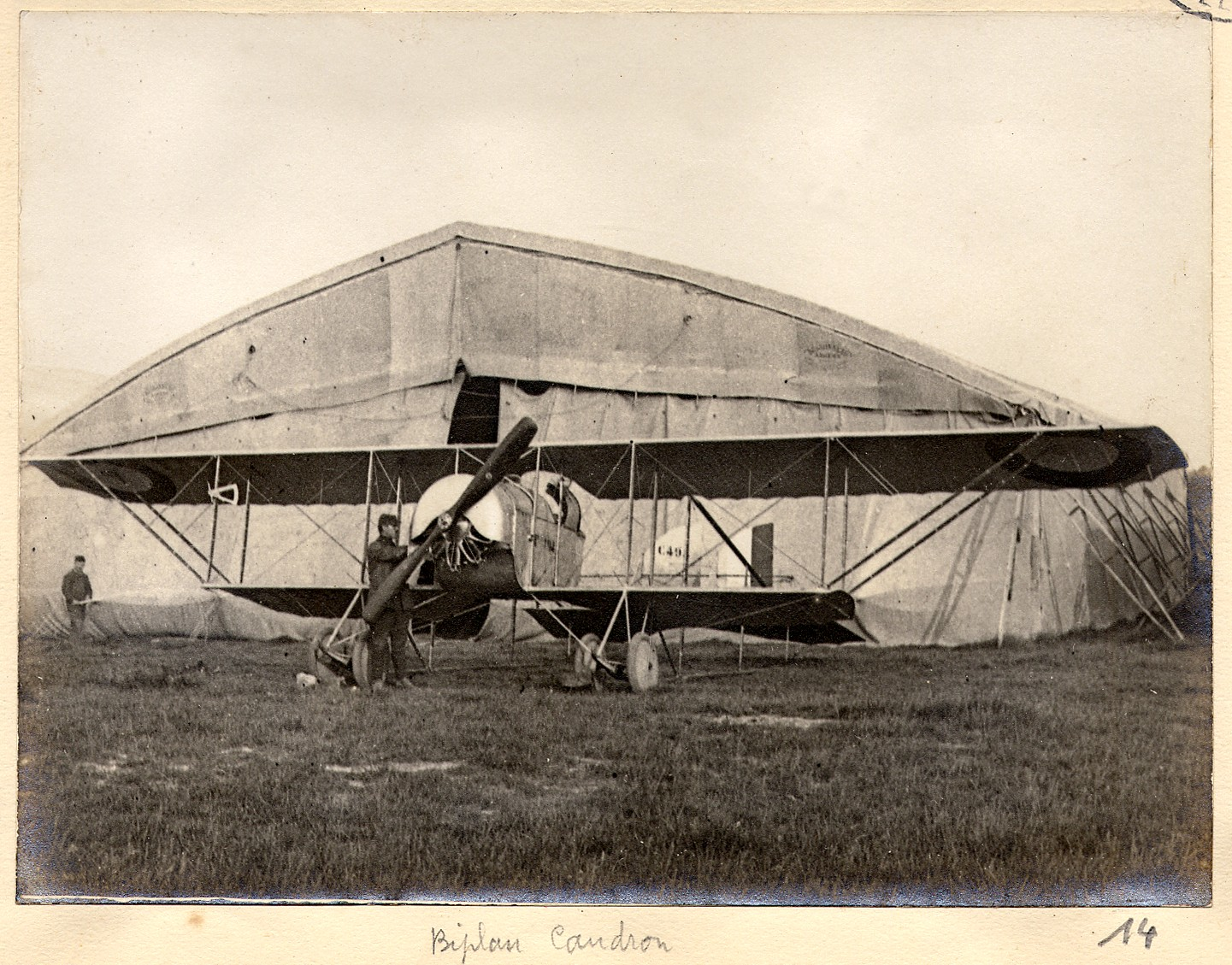
French operational Caudron G.3

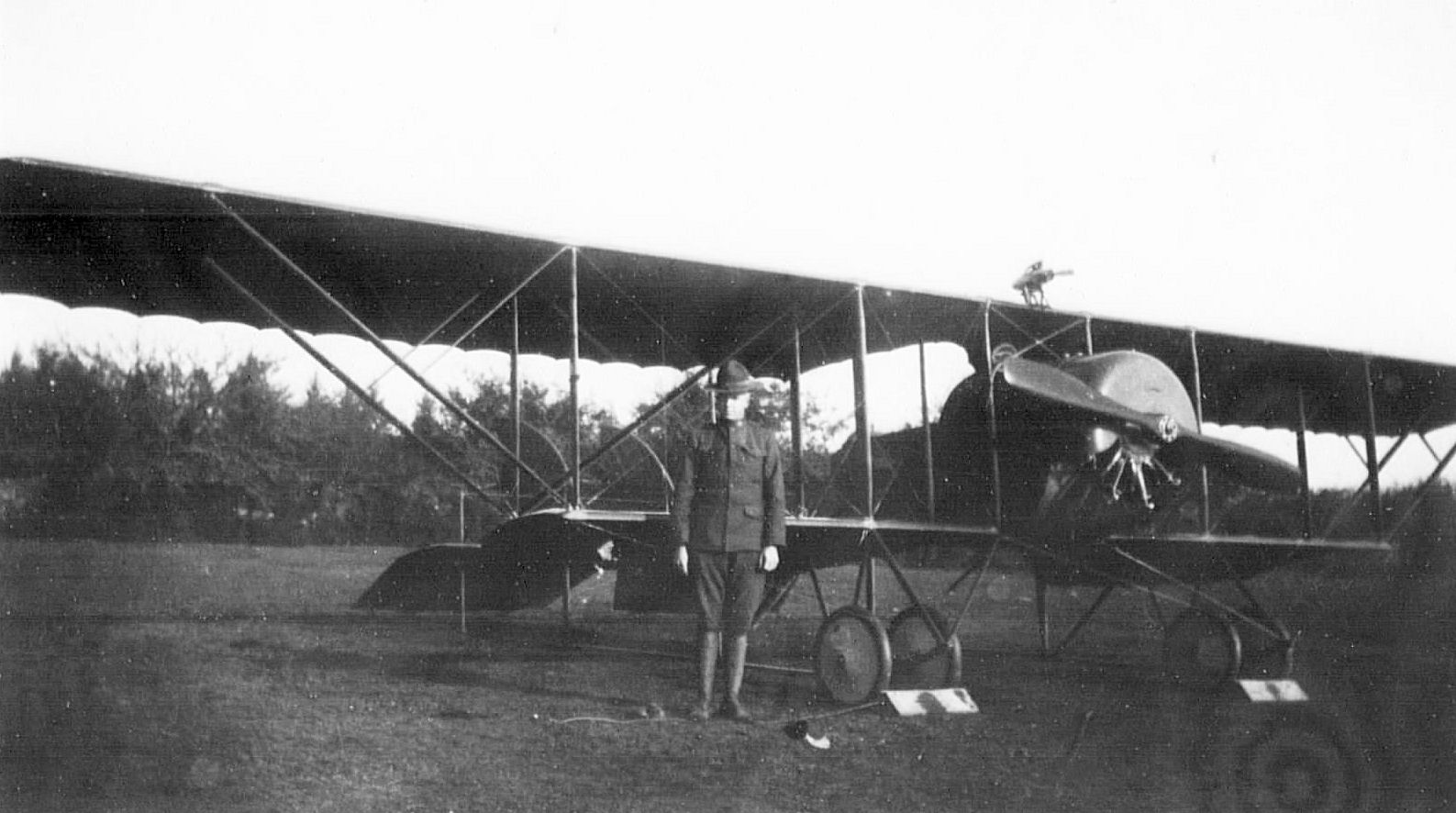
Caudron G.3 operated by the American 800th Aero Squadron as a trainer

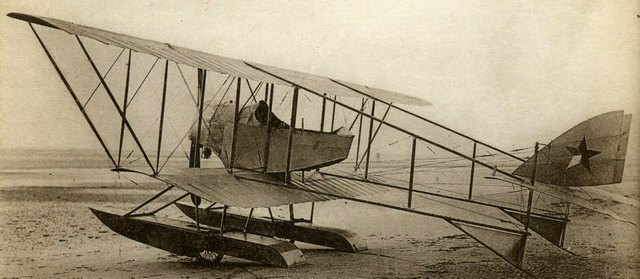
Caudron G.3 floatplane trainer in Chinese service

The G.3 equipped Escadrille C.11 of the French Aéronautique Militaire at the outbreak of war, and was well-suited for reconnaissance use, proving stable and having good visibility. As the war progressed, its low performance and lack of armament made it too vulnerable for front line service, and it was withdrawn from front line operations in mid-1916.

The Italians also used the G.3 for reconnaissance on a wide scale until 1917, as did the British RFC (continuing operations until October 1917), who fitted some with light bombs and machine guns for ground attack. The Australian Flying Corps operated the G.3 during the Mesopotamian campaign of 1915–16.

It continued in use as a trainer until well after the end of the war. Chinese Fengtian clique warlord Caudron G.3s remained in service as trainers until the Mukden Incident of 1931, when many were captured by the Japanese.

In 1921 Adrienne Bolland, a French test pilot working for Caudron, made the first crossing of the Andes by a woman, flying between Argentina and Chile in a G.3.

== Variants ==
Most G.3s were the A2 model, used by various airforces for artillery spotting on the Western front, in Russia and in the Middle East. The G.3 D2 was a two-seat trainer, equipped with dual controls and the E2 was a basic trainer. The R1 version (rouleur or roller) was used by France and the United States Air Service for taxi training, with the wing trimmed down to prevent its becoming airborne. The last version, the G.3. L2, was equipped with a more powerful 100 hp (75 kW) Anzani 10 radial engine. In Germany, Gotha built a few copies of the G.3 as the Gotha LD.3 and Gotha LD.4 (Land Doppeldecker – "Land Biplane").

== Surviving aircraft ==
Few Caudron G.3s survived and most of them are displayed in museums:

- one restored as s/n 324 at the Musée de l'Air et de l'Espace, Paris.

- one restored as s/n 2531 at the Royal Museum of the Armed Forces and Military History, Brussels.

- one restored as 1E18 at the Hallinportti Aviation Museum in Finland.

- one restored as 3066, at the RAF Museum Hendon.

- one restored at the Museu Aeroespacial of Rio de Janeiro.

- one rebuilt from original parts displayed in the Aeronautics Museum of Maracay in Venezuela.

One Caudron G.3 is part of a private collection in France but unrestored.

== Replicas ==
A Caudron G.3 replica is part of the rotary engined contingent of accurately-built vintage aircraft reproductions, at the Old Rhinebeck Aerodrome living aviation museum, in Rhinebeck, New York.

In France, a replica is currently airworthy at La Ferté Alais, powered by a Walter radial engine.

As of 2017, another airworthy replica of the G.3 was introduced to the collections of the Aviation Museum of Metoděj Vlach in Mladá Boleslav, the Czech Republic. Though a replica visually accurate in dimensions and appearance, it was built on an ultralight basis. The project development began in 2009, and the replica was closely based on a Caudron G.3 displayed in the Musée de l’air et de l’espace in Le Bourget, Paris.

== Operators ==
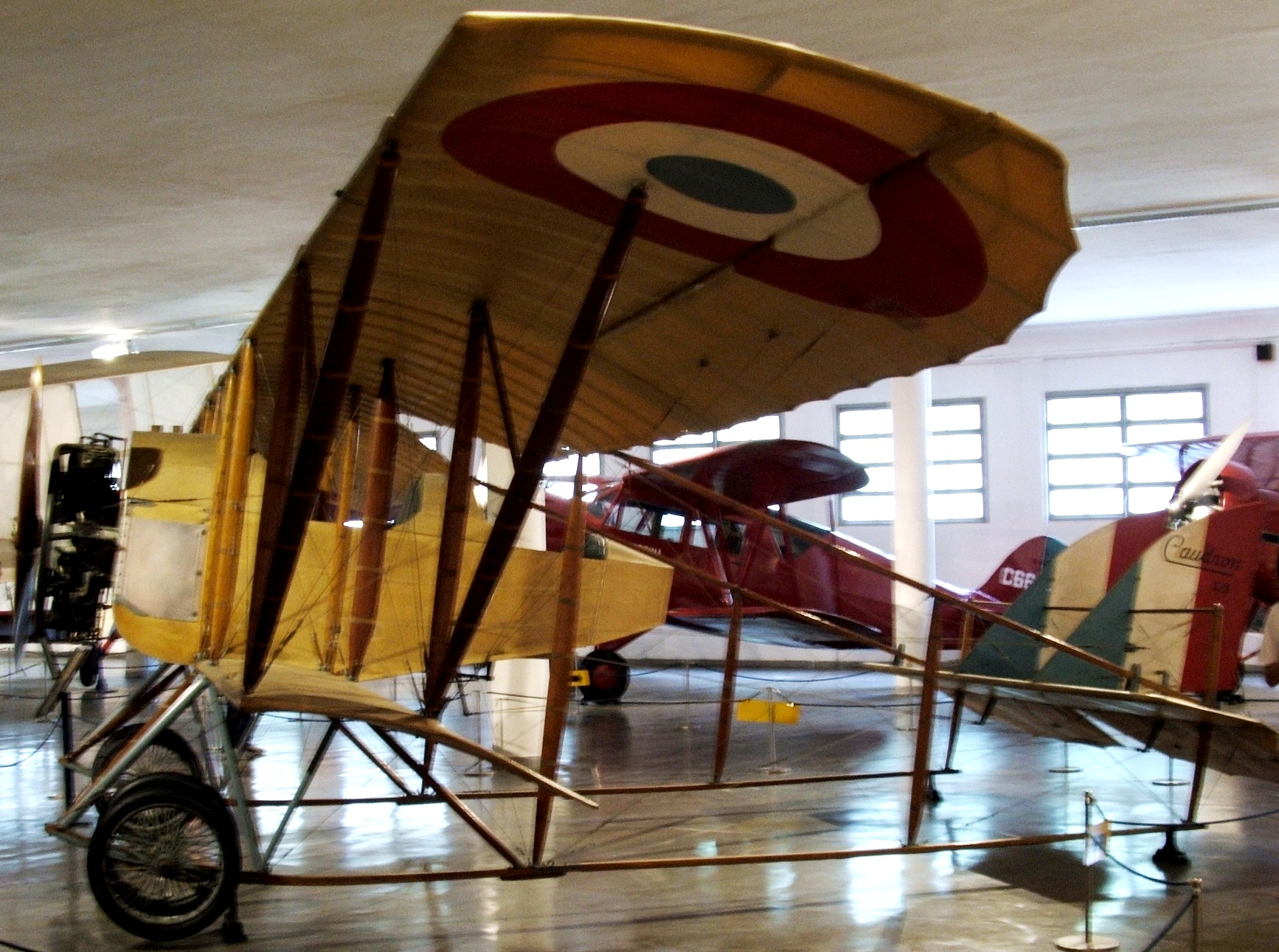
Caudron G.3 in the Airspace Museum (Museu Aeroespacial) in Rio de Janeiro.

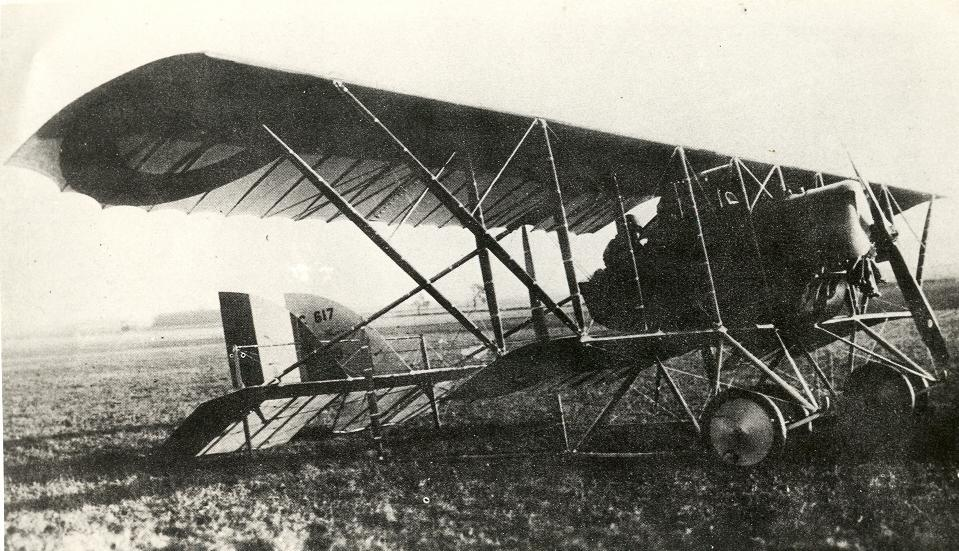
A Caudron G.3 E2, one of the first aircraft of the Colombian Air Force.

Argentina
Argentine Air Force
Australia

- Mesopotamian Half Flight
- Central Flying School AFC at Point Cook, Victoria.

Belgium
Belgian Air Force
Brazil

- Brazilian Air Force

China

- Beiyang Army Aviation Corp – (Purchased 12 from France in 1913.)

Colombia
Colombian Air Force – Three aircraft became Colombia's first military aircraft.
Denmark
Royal Danish Air Force
El Salvador
Salvadoran Air Force – Three aircraft.
Finland
Finnish Air Force – 12 from France in 1920, six built in Finland by Santahaminan ilmailutelakka from 1921 to 1923. One from Flyg Aktiebolaget in 1923. Withdrawn 1924. Nicknamed Tutankhamon.

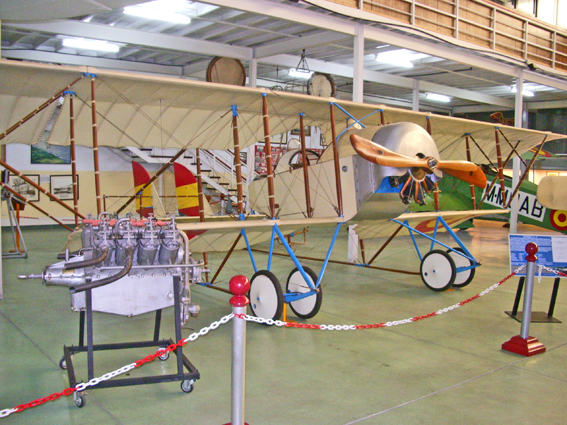
Caudron G.3 replica in "Museo del Aire", Madrid.

France

- French Air Force – Operated by 38 escadrilles.

Greece
Hellenic Air Force
Guatemala

- Guatemalan Air Force

Kingdom of Hejaz

- Hejaz Air Force – built in Italy

Honduras

- Honduran Air Force

Kingdom of Italy

- Corpo Aeronautico Militare

Japan

- Imperial Japanese Army Air Service

Peru

- Peruvian Air Force – One aircraft only.

Portugal
Portuguese Air Force
Poland
Polish Air Force
Romania
Romanian Air Corps
Russia
Imperial Russian Air Force
Serbia

- Serbian Air Force and Air Defense

Kingdom of Spain

- Spanish Air Force – Eighteen bought in 1919 for training at Getafe, Seville and Los Alcázares, replaced by Avro 504Ks in 1924.

Soviet Union
Soviet Air Force – ex-Imperial Russian Air Force.
Turkey
Turkish Air Force – Postwar.
United Kingdom

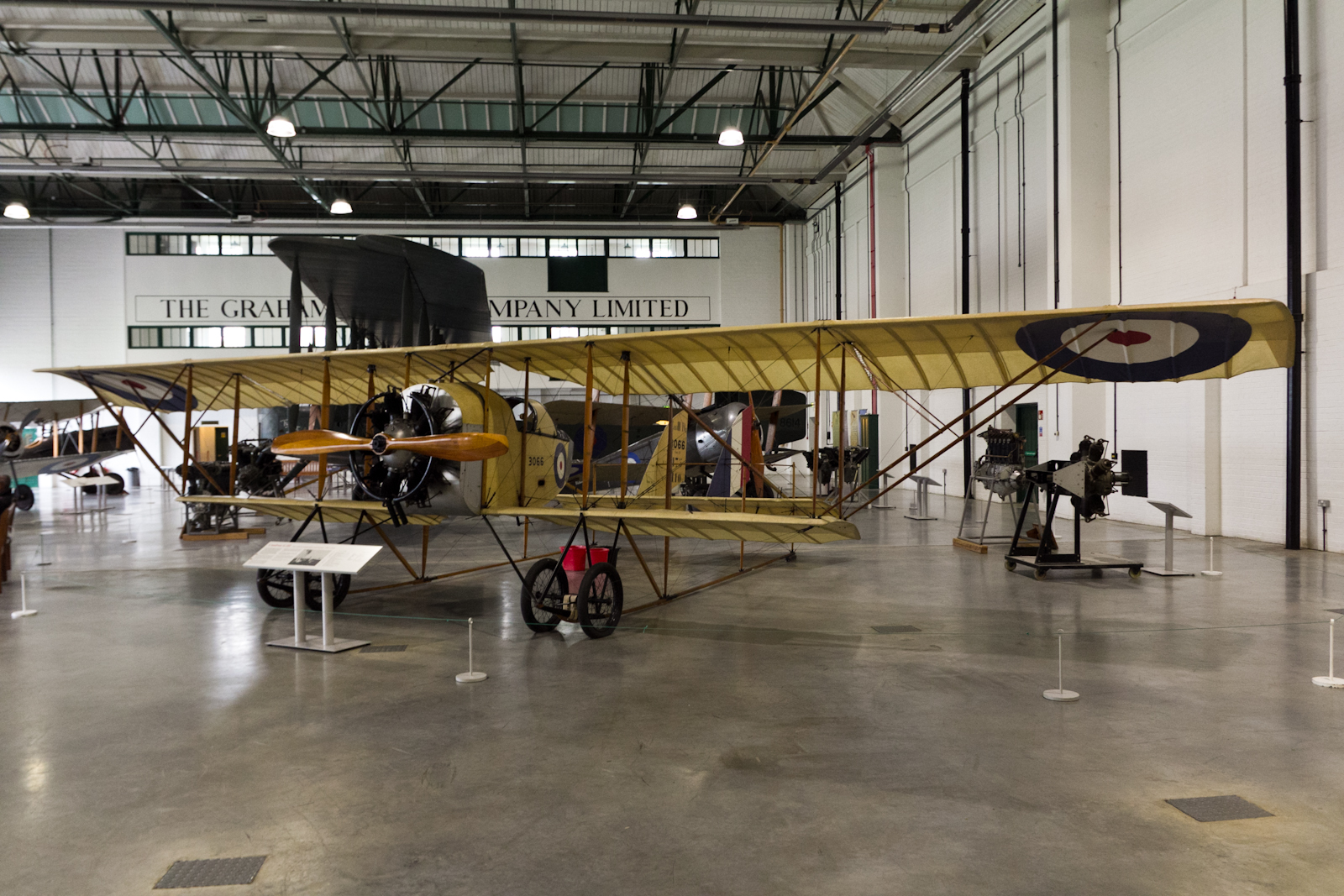
Caudron G.3 at the Royal Air Force Museum London

- Royal Flying Corps
  - No. 1 Squadron RFC
  - No. 4 Squadron RFC
  - No. 5 Squadron RFC
  - No. 19 Squadron RFC
  - No. 23 Squadron RFC
  - No. 25 Squadron RFC
  - No. 29 Squadron RFC
- Royal Naval Air Service – operated 140 primarily as trainers

United States

- American Expeditionary Force
- United States Army Air Service

Venezuela
Venezuelan Air Force

== Specifications (G.3) ==
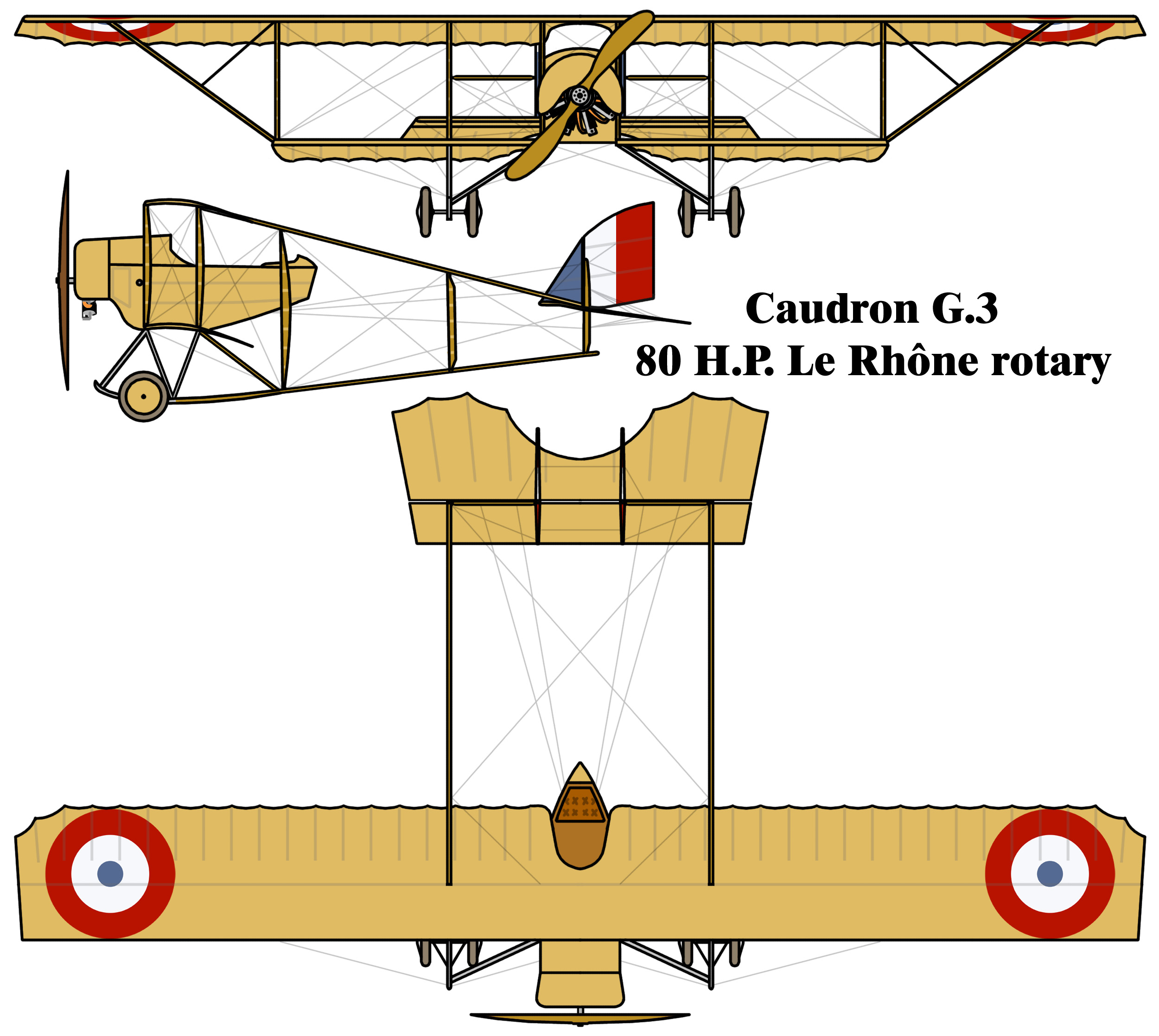
Caudron G.3 drawing

Data from Suomen ilmavoimien lentokoneet 1918-1939

General characteristics

- Crew: 1
- Length: 6.4 m (21 ft 0 in)
- Wingspan: 13.4 m (44 ft 0 in)
- Height: 2.5 m (8 ft 2 in)
- Wing area: 27 m^{2} (290 sq ft)
- Empty weight: 420 kg (926 lb)
- Max takeoff weight: 710 kg (1,565 lb)
- Powerplant: 1 × Le Rhône 9C 9-cylinder air-cooled rotary piston engine, 60 kW (80 hp)
- Propellers: 2-bladed fixed-pitch propeller

Performance

- Maximum speed: 106 km/h (66 mph, 57 kn)
- Endurance: 4 hours
- Service ceiling: 4,300 m (14,100 ft)

Armament

- Guns: One light machine gun (optional)
- Bombs: hand released bombs (optional)

== See also ==
Related development

- Caudron G.4
- Caudron R.4
- Caudron R.11

== Bibliography ==
- Beaubois, Henry (December 1972). "Le Caudron G.III". Le Album de Fanatique de l'Aviation (in French) (39): 15–18. ISSN 0757-4169.
- Hagedorn, Daniel P. (1993). Central American and Caribbean Air Forces. Tonbridge, Kent, UK: Air-Britain (Historians) Ltd. ISBN 0-85130-210-6.
- Herris, Jack (2013). Gotha Aircraft of WWI: A Centennial Perspective on Great War Airplanes. Great War Aviation Centennial Series. Vol. 6. Charleston, South Carolina: Aeronaut Books. ISBN 978-1-935881-14-8.
- Metzmacher, Andreas (2021). Gotha Aircraft 1913-1954: From the London Bomber to the Flying Wing Jet Fighter. Brimscombe, Stroud: Fonthill. ISBN 978-1-78155-706-8.
- "Venezuela Refurbishes Her Aerial Sombrero". Air Enthusiast. Vol. 5, no. 3. September 1973. pp. 118–124, 150.
- Lafille, Jean-Pierre (December 1972). "J'ai piloté le Caudron G.III" [I Flew the Caudron G.III]. Le Album de Fanatique de l'Aviation (in French) (39): 19–20. ISSN 0757-4169.
