= Louis Honore Martin =

French flying ace

- Born: 18 October 1895; Paris, France
- Died: 27 January 1920 (aged 24)
- Military career
- Allegiance: France
- Branch: Aviation
- Rank: Caporal
- Units: Escadrille C56; Escadrille C46; Escadrille Spa97
- Awards: Médaille militaire, Croix de Guerre

Caporal Louis Honore Martin was a French World War I flying ace credited with six aerial victories.

== Early life ==
Louis Honore Martin was born in Paris, supposedly on 18 October 1895. He was the son of a customs agent. As he was too young for military service when the First World War began, he fibbed about his age, changing his birth year from 1896 to 1895.

== Military service ==
Martin entered military service in the latter part of 1915, qualifying as a first mechanic on 11 August. Transferred out of Escadrille C56, (Note: The "C" designation denoted Caudron aircraft in use by the unit.) he went to serve as a machine gunner in Escadrille C46 of the French Armée de l'Air beginning 18 July 1916. Martin joined a Caudron aircrew whose other members were Jean Loste and Pierre Barbou. Martin scored six aerial victories, starting 27 July 1916 and ending 26 January 1917. On 27 November 1917, he was ordered to pilot's training.

Martin overcame lingering health problems to qualify as a pilot on 12 April 1918. A promotion to Caporal accompanied this achievement. He would be posted to Escadrille Spa97 (Note: The "Spa" denoted the squadron's usage of SPAD fighters.) on 22 October 1918. He went back on medical care ten days later, apparently ending the war in hospital.

== Postwar ==
Louis Honore Martin died on 27 January 1920 of his chronic health problems.

== Awards and decorations ==
- Médaille militaire

"Machine-gunner of exceptional skill and courage. He has had multiple aerial combats during the course of which he succeeded in downing four enemy planes. In the last one, on 1 November 1916, he descended to within 150 meters of the ground to down a German plane in flames, in its own territory; having had one motor damaged, he had to recross the lines at low altitude, returning with his plane riddled by bullets." Médaille militaire citation, 24 November 1916

- Croix de guerre with five palmes and an etoile.

== Bibliography ==
- Franks, Norman and Frank Bailey (2008). Over The Front: The Complete Record of the Fighter Aces and Units of the United States and French Air Services, 1914-1918 . Grub Street Publishing. ISBN 0948817542 ISBN 978-0948817540
- Guttman, Jon and Harry Dempsey (2015). Reconnaissance and Bomber Aces of World War 1 (Aircraft of the Aces). Osprey Publishing. ISBN 1782008012, ISBN 978-1782008019 (Note: Both Kindle and paperback editions were utilized.)
