= Caudron G.6 =

French reconnaissance aircraft

G.6
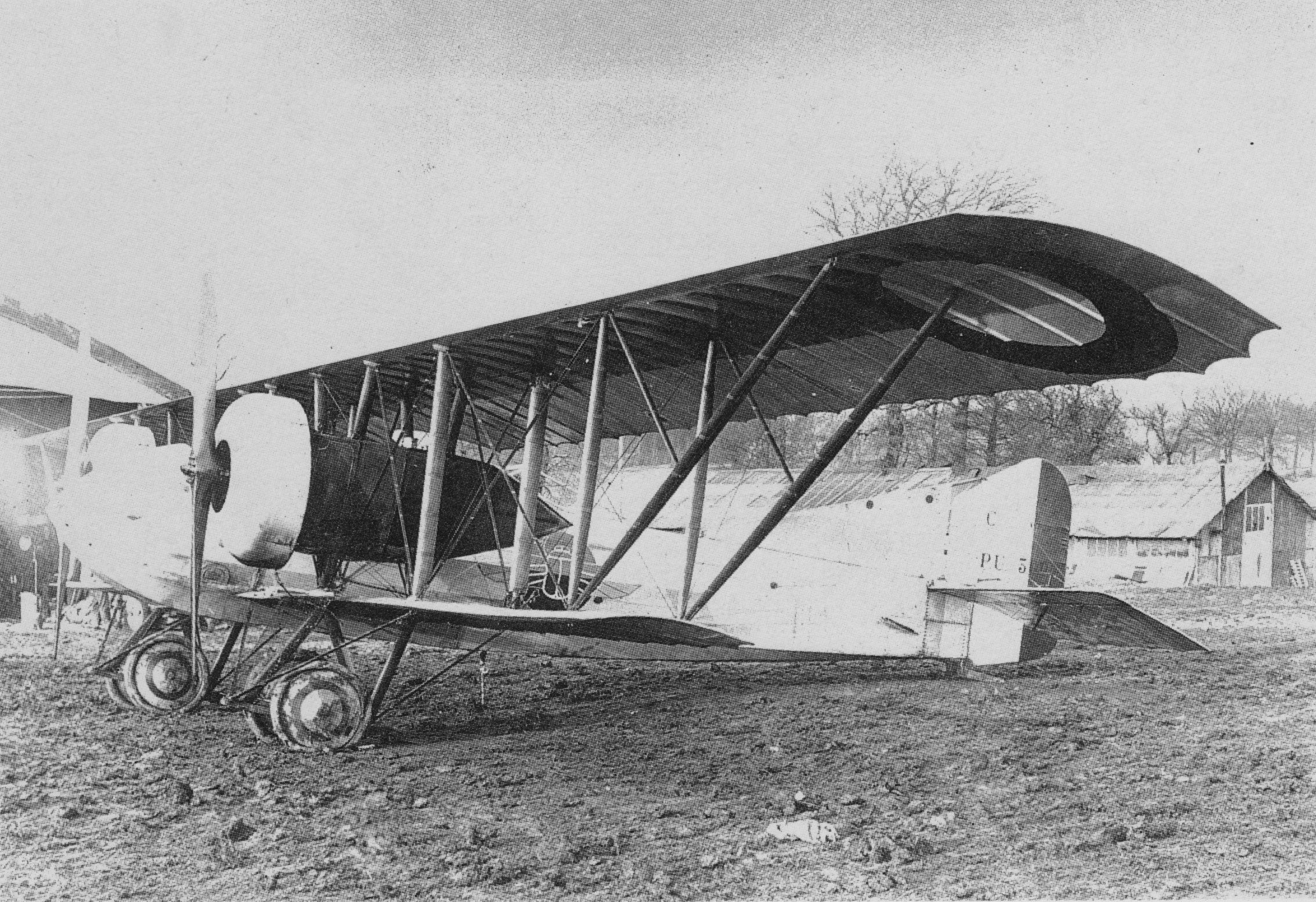

General information
- Type: Reconnaissance aircraft
- Manufacturer: Caudron
- Designer: Paul Deville
- Primary user: Aviation Militaire
- Number built: 512

History
- First flight: 1916

The Caudron G.6 was a French reconnaissance aircraft of World War I. It married the wings and engine layout of the unorthodox Caudron G.4 to an all-new fuselage of conventional design. Over 500 of these aircraft were used by the French military for reconnaissance and artillery-spotting duties in 1917 and 1918.

== Operators ==
France

- Aviation Militaire

== Specifications ==
General characteristics

- Crew: Two, pilot and observer
- Length: 8.60 m (28 ft 3 in)
- Wingspan: 17.22 m (56 ft 6 in)
- Height: 2.95 m (9 ft 8 in)
- Empty weight: 940 kg (2,072 lb)
- Gross weight: 1,435 kg (3,164 lb)
- Powerplant: 2 × Le Rhône 9Jb , 97 kW (130 hp) each

Performance

- Maximum speed: 150 km/h (96 mph, 83 kn)
- Endurance: 2 hours 30 minutes
- Service ceiling: 4,725 m (15,500 ft)
- Rate of climb: 4.4 m/s (866 ft/min)

Armament

- 2 × .303 Lewis guns in flexible mount for observer
- up to 100 kg (220 lb) of bombs carried externally

== Bibliography ==
- Cony, Christophe (July 1997). "Aviateur d'Observation en 14/18 (deuxième partie)" [Observation Aircraft of 14/18]. Avions: Toute l'aéronautique et son histoire (in French) (52): 10–15. ISSN 1243-8650.
