= Caudron R.11 =

French WW1 fighter aircraft

R.XI
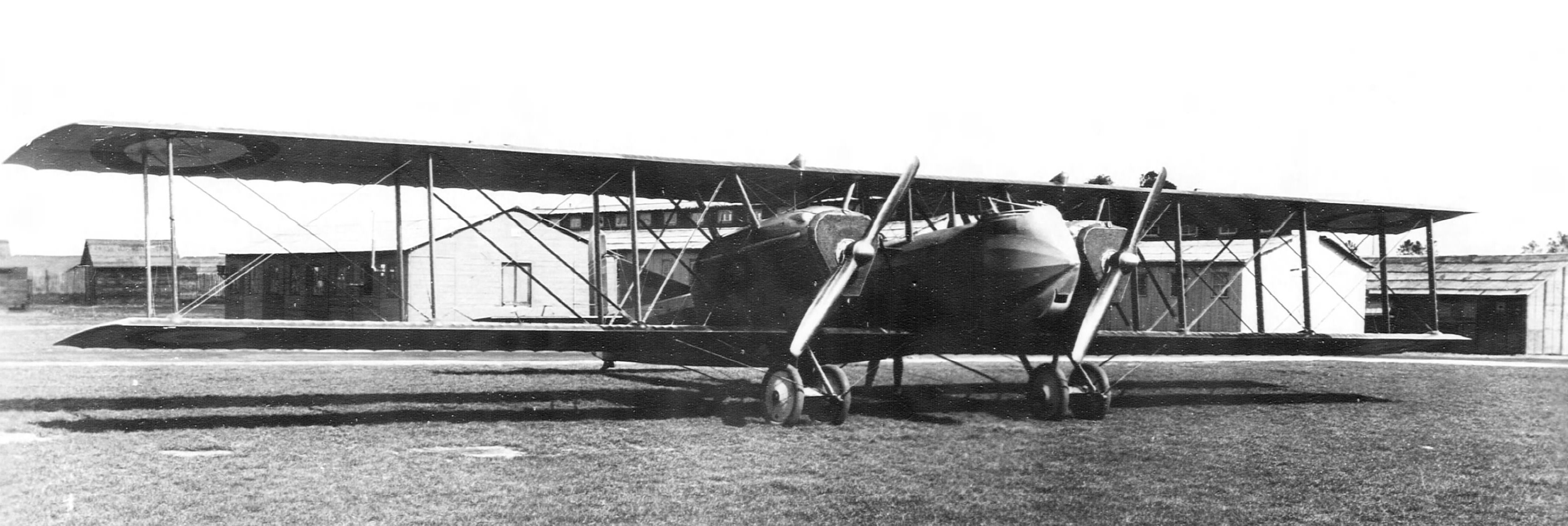

General information
- Type: Heavy fighter
- Manufacturer: Caudron
- Designer: Paul Deville
- Primary user: France
- Number built: 370

History
- Manufactured: 1917-1918
- Introduction date: 1918
- First flight: 1916
- Retired: July 1922
- Developed from: Caudron R.4

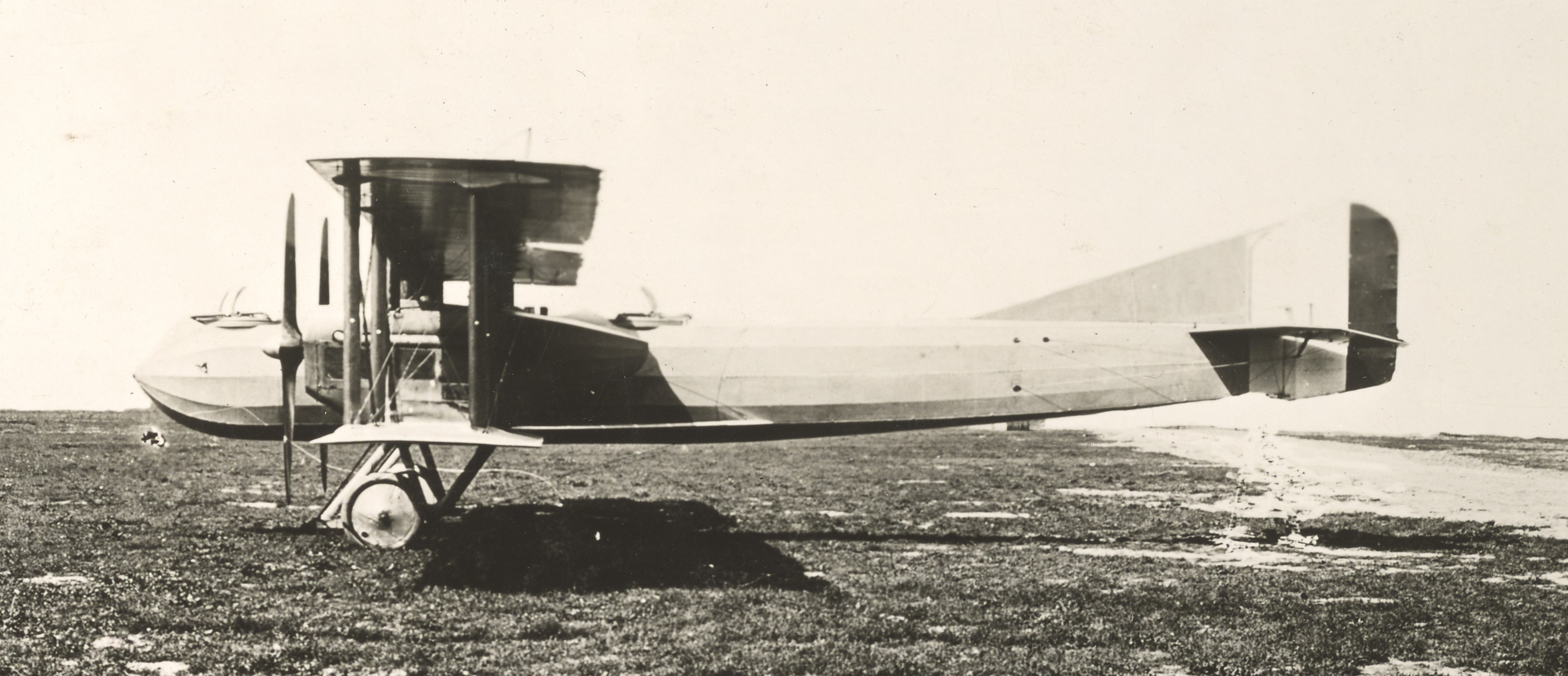
Caudron R.XI posed for official type photos, showing large balanced rudder and fin.

The Caudron R.11 (or R.XI in contemporary usage), was a French three-seat twin-engine long range escort fighter biplane developed and produced by Caudron during the First World War.

== Development ==
The R.XI was intended to fulfill a French Corps d'Armee requirement for a long range three-seat escort fighter. Its design was similar to the Caudron R.4, but without a nose-wheel, and with longer wings and fuselage, with two bracing bays outboard the engines rather than three, along with a much larger tail. Hispano-Suiza 8Ba liquid-cooled V-8 engines were housed in streamlined nacelles just above the lower wing, fitted with frontal radiators, which replaced the air-cooled Renault engines used in the R.4.

== Operational history ==
Production of the 1000 R.XIs ordered by the French Army began in 1917, with the first aircraft completed late in that year.

The first escadrille, R 46, was equipped with the type in February 1918 and the last escadrille to form was R 246, before the Armistice resulted in an abrupt end to production, at which point approximately 370 aircraft had been completed by Caudron, Régy Frères and Gremont.

== Variants ==
Caudron R.XI C.3
Heavy escort fighter with 160 kW (215 hp) Hispano-Suiza 8Bda engines.

Caudron R.XII C.3
R.XI with the more powerful 224 kW (300 hp) Hispano-Suiza 8Fb engines that were expected to boost performance. Sources differ, but it may have had a slightly increased wing area, to 60 m^{2} (646 sq ft) and an extra wing bay was added outboard of the engines. It first flew in November 1918 but was still undergoing testing in mid-1919 and no production followed despite plans to equip 12 escadrilles.

Caudron R.XIV Ca.3
Similar to the R.XII, but armed with a 37 mm (1.5 in) Hotchkiss cannon in addition to the normal complement of five machine guns, and with further increased wing area, to 63 m^{2} (678 sq ft), and a larger, unbalanced rudder. A single example was built following the conversion of an R.XI to carry the cannon in August 1918.

== Operators ==
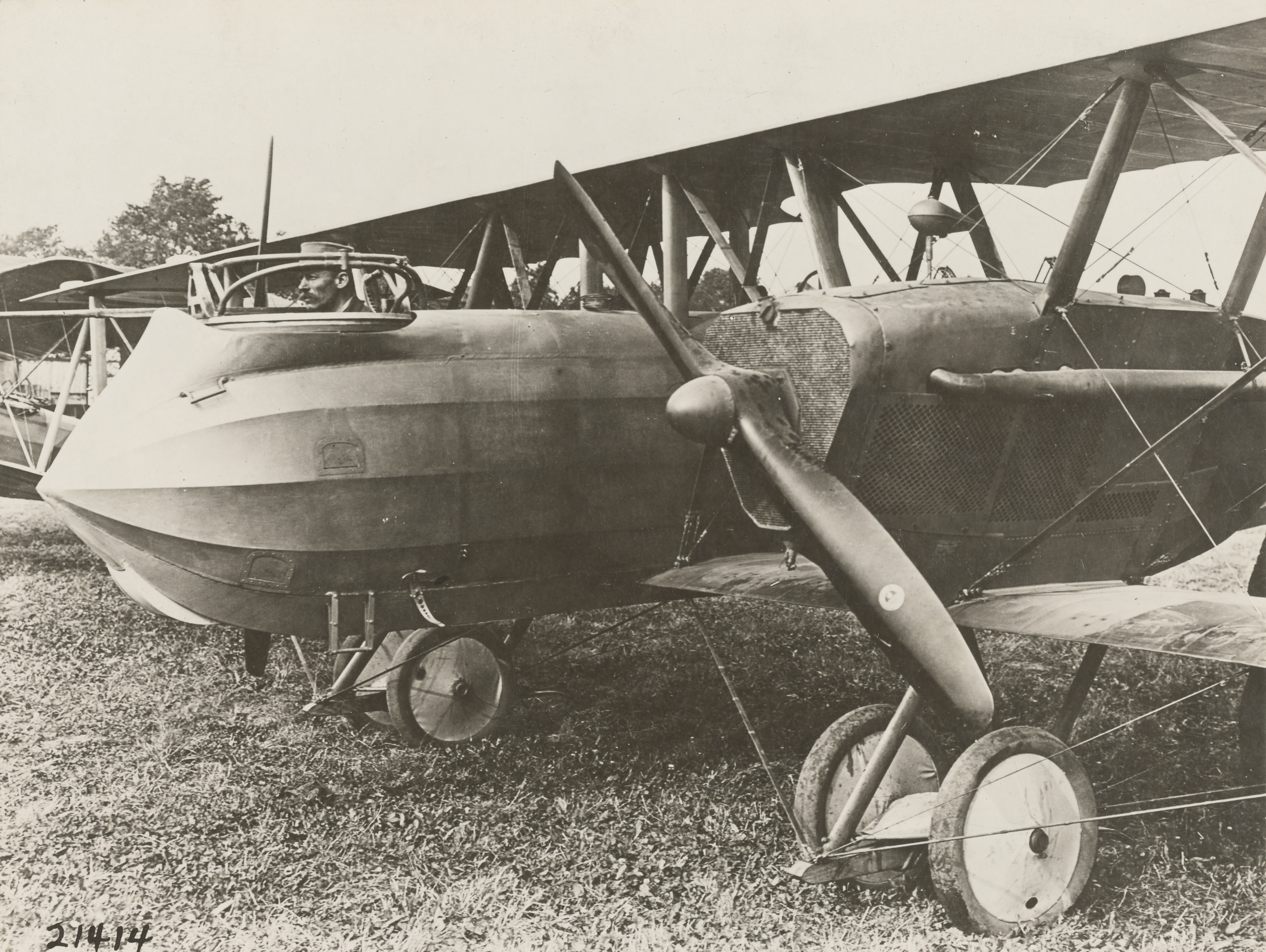
R.XI nose and engine nacelle detail

France

- French Air Force
  - Escadrille R 46
  - Escadrille R 239
  - Escadrille R 240
  - Escadrille R 241
  - Escadrille R 242
  - Escadrille R 246

United Kingdom

- Royal Air Force received two examples for evaluation as a bomber.

United States

- American Expeditionary Force received two examples for evaluation, and two others were detached to US units.

== Specifications (Caudron R.XI C.3) ==
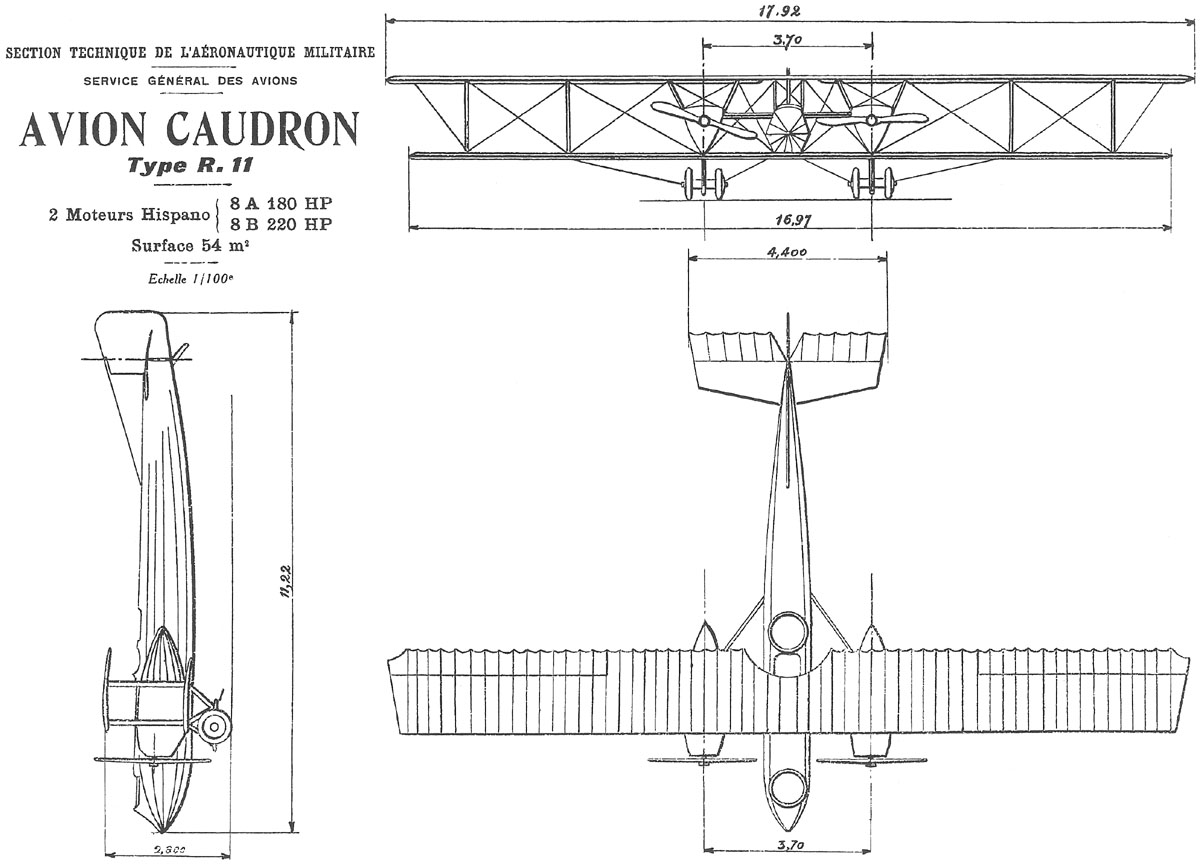
Caudron R.11 drawing

Data from Davilla, 1997, p.168

General characteristics

- Crew: 3
- Length: 11.22 m (36 ft 10 in)
- Upper wingspan: 17.92 m (58 ft 10 in)
- Lower wingspan: 16.97 m (55 ft 8 in)
- Height: 2.8 m (9 ft 2 in)
- Wing area: 54.25 m^{2} (583.9 sq ft)
- Empty weight: 1,422 kg (3,135 lb)
- Gross weight: 2,165 kg (4,773 lb)
- Fuel capacity: 220 L (48 imp gal; 58 US gal)
- Powerplant: 2 × Hispano-Suiza 8Bda V-8 water-cooled piston engines, 160 kW (215 hp) each
- Propellers: 2-bladed wooden fixed pitch propellers

Performance

- Maximum speed: 190 km/h (120 mph, 100 kn) at sea level

- 183 km/h (114 mph) at 2,000 m (6,600 ft)
- 178 km/h (111 mph) at 3,000 m (9,800 ft)
- 173 km/h (107 mph) at 4,000 m (13,000 ft)
- 164 km/h (102 mph) at 5,000 m (16,000 ft)

- Range: 600 km (370 mi, 320 nmi)
- Endurance: 3 hours
- Service ceiling: 5,950 m (19,520 ft)
- Time to altitude:

- 2,000 m (6,600 ft) in 8 minutes 10 seconds
- 3,000 m (9,800 ft) in 14 minutes 30 seconds
- 4,000 m (13,000 ft) in 22 minutes 30 seconds
- 5,000 m (16,000 ft) in 39 minutes

- Wing loading: 39.9 kg/m^{2} (8.18 lb/sq ft)
- Power/mass: 18.08 kW/kg (11.00 hp/lb) This power to weight is wrong.

Armament

- Guns: 5 x 7.7 mm (0.303 in) Lewis machine guns

Related development

- Caudron R.6

Aircraft of comparable role, configuration, and era

- SPAD SA.3
- Ponnier P.1

== Bibliography ==
- Cony, Christophe (August 1997). "Aviateur d'Observation en 14/18 (3ème partie et fin)" [Aircraft observers in 1914-1918 (third and final part)]. Avions: Toute l'aéronautique et son histoire (in French). No. 53. pp. 16–21. ISSN 1243-8650.
- Davilla, J. J.; Soltan, A. (1997). French Aircraft of the First World War. Mountain View, CA: Flying Machines Press. ISBN 978-1891268090.
- "French aeroplanes in service at the front". Flight. 13 February 1919. p. 204.
- Green, W.; Swanborough, G (1994). The Complete Book of Fighters. New York: Smithmark. ISBN 0-8317-3939-8.
- Owers, Colin A. (2013). Caudron R.11. Windsock Datafile No. 161. Albatros Productions. ISBN 978-1906798338.
