= Andre Delorme =

Andre Jean Delorme
- Born: 7 June 1890; Terrenoire, France
- Died: 14 January 1917 (aged 26)
- Military career
- Allegiance: France
- Branch: Infantry, then flying service
- Service years: 1914–1917
- Rank: Sous lieutenant
- Unit: Escadrille 56, Escadrille 38
- Awards: Légion d'honneur, Médaille militaire, Croix de Guerre

Sous Lieutenant Andre Jean Delorme (7 June 1890 – 14 January 1917) was a World War I flying ace credited with five confirmed aerial victories. He was wounded four times in defense of his country before being killed in action.

== Biography ==
Andre Jean Delorme was born 7 June 1890 in Terrenoire, France. On 27 July 1914, he was recalled from pilot training for duty with his infantry regiment. He was wounded three times late that year, while being promoted through the ranks to Adjutant. He was returned to aviation training on 5 December 1914, receiving Military Pilot's Brevet No. 2026 on 14 June 1915.

Delorme was posted to Escadrille 56. He flew well enough to garner the Médaille Militaire on 21 February 1916. Despite flying a two-seat reconnaissance airplane, he scored his first two victories over German planes in May and June. On 10 June 1916, he became a Chevalier de la Legion d'honneur. Then, on 31 July 1916, he was wounded so severely he was evacuated to hospital.

After recuperating, Delorme returned to duty with Escadrille 38. Now equipped with a fighter, he scored victories on 26 November and 21 December 1916. On 5 January 1917, he shot down his fifth German plane. Nine days later, he was killed in action.

== Citations of awards ==
Médaille Militaire

"Adjudant of Escadrille C56, pilot of remarkable audacity and sangfroid. His missions instantly and with great initiative and then executes them with remarkable energy. On 6 February 1916, he descended to 700 meters to bomb an important station where he caused an explosion and a fire. He flew more than an hour in the clouds completely lost in enemy territory, but succeeded to land in our lines as his fuel gave out."

Légion d'Honneur

"Sous Lieutenant of Escadrille C56 distinguished himself by his brilliant conduct in the infantry, fighting at the start of the war during which he was wounded twice. As an airplane pilot, he has continued to demonstrate bravery. On 28 May 1916, after having executed a bombardment, he was attacked by a German scout which he downed, returning to the Escadrille with his plane riddled by bullets.
