= Caudron G.4 =

French WW1 bomber aircraft

G.4
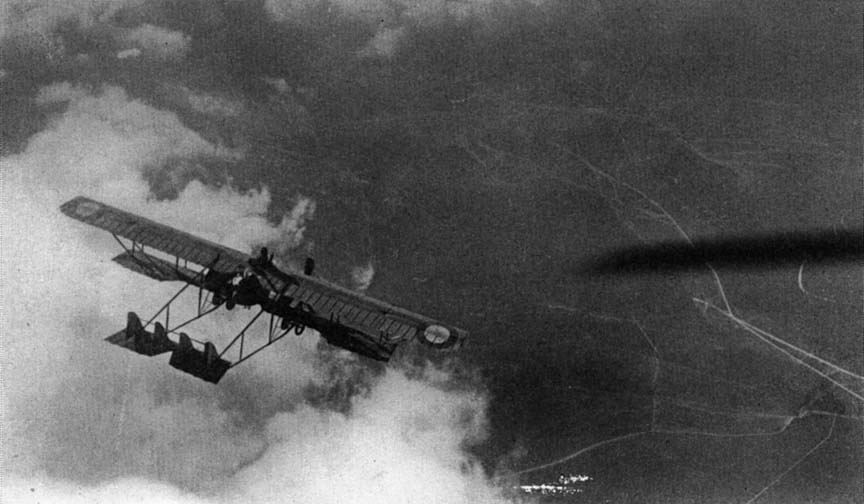
- Caudron G-4 on reconnaissance near Verdun in 1917

General information
- Type: Bomber
- Manufacturer: Caudron
- Designer: Caudron Frères
- Primary users: French Air Force Corpo Aeronautico Militare; RNAS; Finnish Air Force
- Number built: 1,421

History
- First flight: March 1915
- Developed from: Caudron G.3

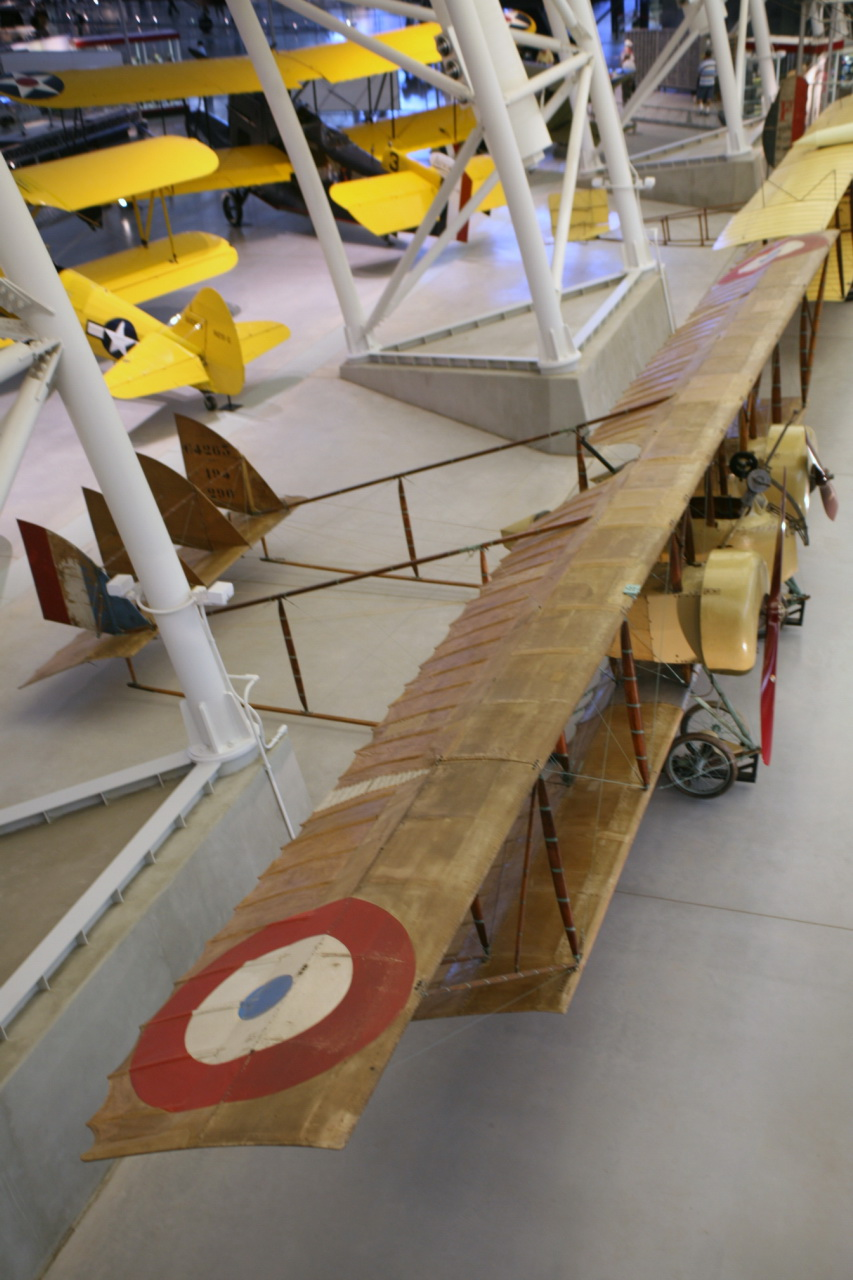
Caudron G.4 in Steven F. Udvar-Hazy Center

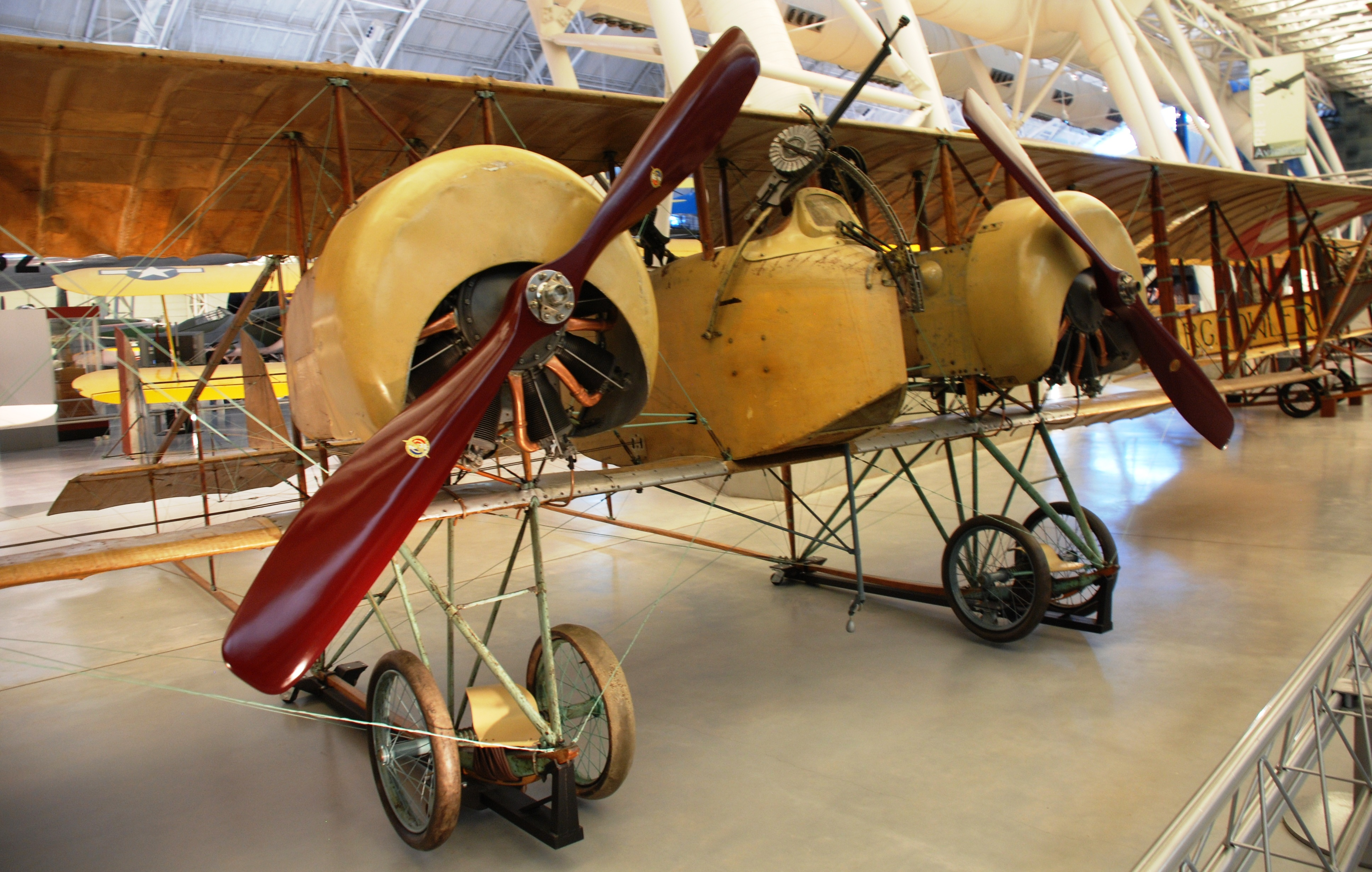
Caudron G.4 in Steven F. Udvar-Hazy Center

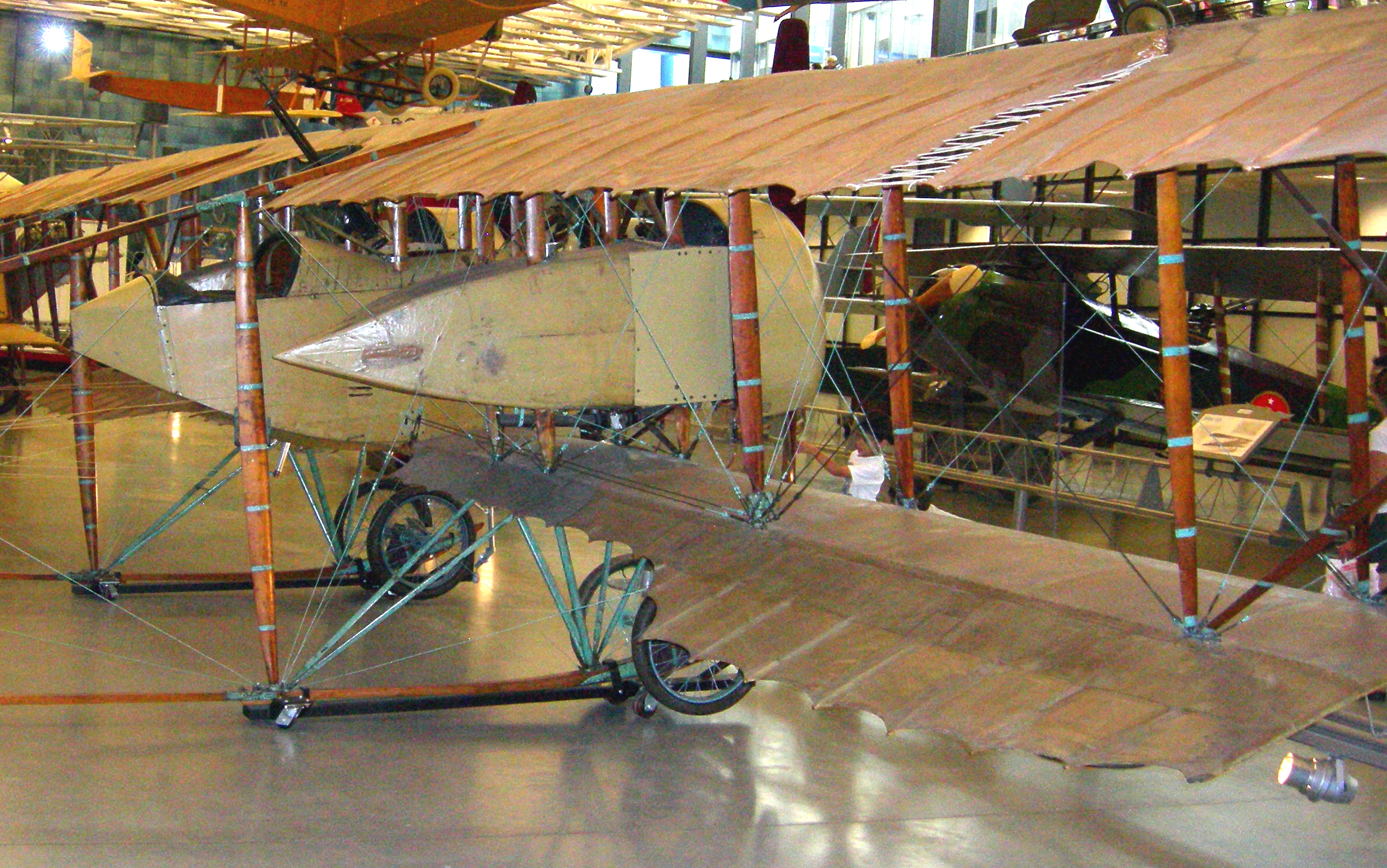
Side view of Caudron G.4 in Steven F. Udvar-Hazy Center.

The Caudron G.4 is a French biplane with twin engines, widely used during World War I as a bomber. It was designed by René and Gaston Caudron as an improvement over their single-engined Caudron G.3. The aircraft employed wing warping for banking. The first G.4 was built in 1915, and it was manufactured in France, England and Italy. It was the world's first twin-engine aircraft to be widely used, starting in March 1915.

The Caudron G.4 was used as a reconnaissance bomber against the German Empire. Later, when Germany developed a fighter force, the aircraft was used for night bombing.

The G.4 was in use in Belgium, France, Finland, Italy, Portugal, the United Kingdom, and the United States.

== Development ==
While the Caudron G.3 was a reliable reconnaissance aircraft, it could not carry a useful bombload, and owing to its design, was difficult to fit with useful defensive armament. In order to solve these problems, the Caudron G.4 was designed as a twin-engined development of the G.3, first flying in March 1915. While the G.4 had a similar pod and boom layout to the G.3, it had two Le Rhône rotary or Anzani 10 radial engines mounted on struts between the wings instead of a single similar engine at the front of the crew nacelle, while wingspan was increased and the tailplane had four rudders instead of two. This allowed an observer/gunner position to be fitted in the nose of the nacelle, while the additional power allowed it to carry a bombload of 100 kg.

The G.4 was one of the few twin-engine aircraft to be able to fly with one engine stopped.

With two engines and a large wing area, the G.4 had enough power to break altitude records. In May 1915, the French aviator Etienne Poulet broke the altitude record with 3 passengers, reaching a height of 5.850 m (19.226 ft).

In Italy, on 9 November 1916, the Italian aviator Guido Guidi set a world absolute altitude record, reaching a height of 26.083 ft (7.950m).

A total of 1358 G.4s were produced in France, while a further 51 examples were produced by the A.E.R. company in Italy and 12 were built in Britain by the British Caudron company.

== Operational history ==
=== World War I ===
The G.4 entered service with the French Aéronautique Militaire in November 1915. It was the first twin-engine aircraft in service in any numbers with the French. The Caudron G.4 was used to carry out bombing raids deep behind the front line, being used to attack targets as far away as the Rhineland. Increasing losses led to its withdrawal from day bombing missions by the French in the autumn of 1916.

The Caudron G.4 also allowed many crews to shoot down enemy aircraft. It was on this aircraft type that René Fonck scored his first homologated victories, notably by forcing a German Rumpler C.I reconnaissance aircraft to land behind Allied lines on 6 August 1916.

Many aces of the First World War also distinguished themselves in air combat aboard Caudron G.4: the French René Pierre Marie Dorme, Jean Chaput, Marcel Vialet, André Martenot de Cordoux, René Pélissier, Joseph Vuillemin, René Doumer, André Jean Delorme, Didier Lecour Grandmaison but also the Russian ace Viktor Fyodorov (three victories aboard a G.4).

Eugene Bullard, the first black American military pilot, learnt to fly on a Caudron G.3 and a Caudron G.4.

The United States government purchased in 1917 a first Caudron G.4 for technical evaluation through the American Ambassador, William Graves Sharp. A second purchase of 10 aircraft was done at the end of 1917 for training purpose. The american G.4 were assigned to the U.S. Air Service's 2nd Air Instruction Center at Tours.

The British Royal Naval Air Service (RNAS) also used the G.4 as a bomber, receiving 55, of which twelve were licence-built by the British Caudron company and the remainder supplied from France. Number 4 and 5 Wing RNAS used the G.4 for attacks against German seaplane and airship bases in Belgium. It was finally replaced in RNAS service by Handley Page O/100 aircraft in the autumn of 1917. Italian G.4s proved successful in operating in the mountainous Alpine fronts, where its good altitude capabilities proved useful. The G.4 was also used by the Imperial Russian Air Force for reconnaissance purposes.

=== Use in Finland ===
The Finnish Air Force purchased one G.4 as well as two G.3s aircraft with spares, from Flyg Aktiebolaget on 26 April 1923 for 100,000 Finnish markka. The G.4 was used by the FAF as an ambulance aircraft in 1923.

== Variants ==
The first G.4 prototype flew in March 1915. The G.4 was manufactured in three main versions, A.2 for reconnaissance, B.2 for bombing and E.2 for training. The A.2 was equipped with a radio for fire spotting, B.2 could carry 100 kg (220 lb) of bombs and the E.2 was equipped with dual controls. G.4IB (French: Blindage) was an armored version. There were also other bomber and escort aircraft versions. The Japanese Army received an unknown number of Caudron G.4s, which it designated 戊 1 (Bo 1).

The Caudron G.6 was a further developed G.4, with a conventional fuselage and tail replacing the pod and boom arrangement of the G.3.

== Operators ==
Belgium

- Belgian Air Force

Colombia
Colombian Air Force
France
Aeronautique Militaire
Finland
Finnish Air Force
Kingdom of Italy
Corpo Aeronautico Militare
Portugal
Portuguese Military Aeronautical Service
Romania
Romanian Air Corps
Russia
Imperial Russian Air Service
Soviet Union
Soviet Air Force - Taken over from the Imperial Russian Air Force.
United Kingdom
Royal Naval Air Service
United States

- American Expeditionary Force
- United States Army Air Service

Venezuela

- Venezuelan Air Force
- Venezuelan Navy

== Surviving aircraft ==
Two Caudron G.4s are displayed in national museums. C.4263 is preserved at the Steven F. Udvar-Hazy Center in Chantilly, Virginia, United States. C.1720 is displayed at the Musée de l'Air et de l'Espace, Paris.

A third Caudron G.4 is under restoration in France by Antoine Ros, a WW1 aircraft specialist.

== Specifications (G.4) ==
Caudron G.4 drawing

Data from Suomen ilmavoimien lentokoneet 1918-1939

General characteristics

- Crew: 2 (pilot and observer/gunner)
- Length: 7.27 m (23 ft 10 in)
- Wingspan: 17.2 m (56 ft 5 in)
- Height: 2.6 m (8 ft 6 in)
- Wing area: 38 m^{2} (410 sq ft)
- Empty weight: 733 kg (1,616 lb)
- Max takeoff weight: 1,180 kg (2,601 lb)
- Powerplant: 2 × Le Rhône 9C 9-cylinder air-cooled rotary piston engines, 60 kW (80 hp) each
- Propellers: 2-bladed fixed-pitch propellers

Performance

- Maximum speed: 124 km/h (77 mph, 67 kn)
- Endurance: 3½ hours
- Service ceiling: 4,000 m (13,000 ft)

Armament

- Guns: 1 × machine gun
- Bombs: 113 kg (250 lb) of bombs

== Bibliography ==
- Cony, Christophe (July 1997). "Aviateur d'Observation en 14/18 (deuxième partie)" [Observation Aircraft of 14/18]. Avions: Toute l'aéronautique et son histoire (in French) (52): 10–15. ISSN 1243-8650.
