= Heinrich Gontermann =

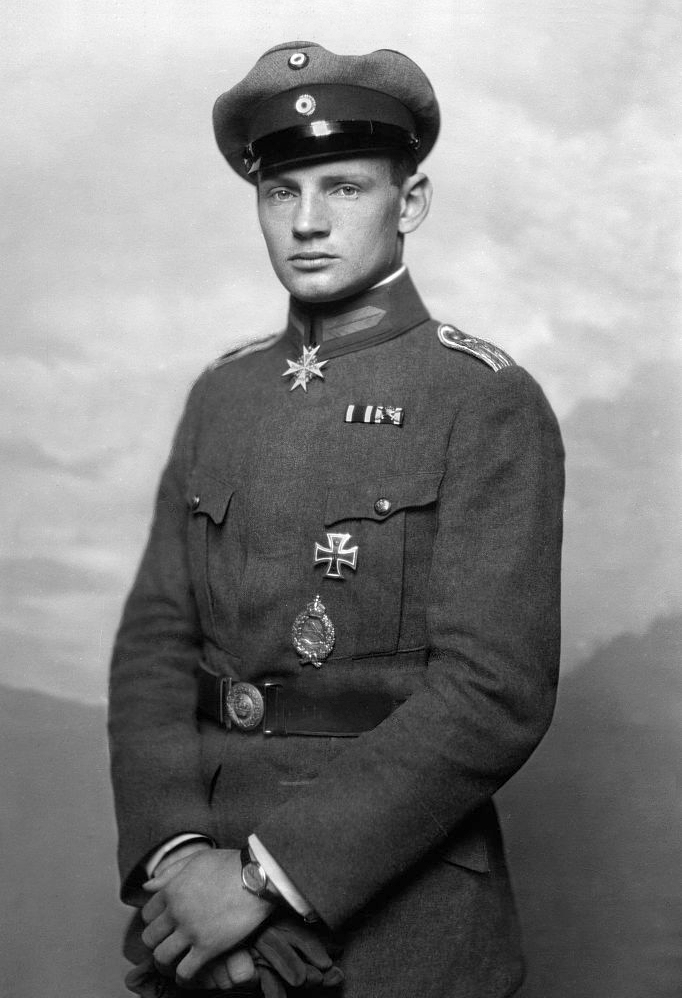
- Born: 25 February 1896; Siegen, Province of Westphalia, Kingdom of Prussia, German Empire
- Died: 30 October 1917 (aged 21); La Neuville, France
- Military career
- Allegiance: German Empire
- Branch: Imperial German Army
- Service years: 1914–1917
- Rank: Leutnant
- Nickname: Heini
- Units: 6th Uhlan Cavalry Regiment; Landwehr Infantry Regiment No. 80; Kampfstaffel Tergnier; Field-Abteilung 25; Jagdstaffel 5 Jagdstaffel 15
- Commands: Jasta 15
- Conflicts: First World War
- Awards: Pour le Mérite

Heinrich Gontermann (25 February 1896 – 30 October 1917) was a German fighter ace credited with 39 victories during the First World War.

== Life ==
Born in Siegen, Southern Westphalia, on 25 February 1896, Heinrich Gontermann grew into a tall slender man, full of vitality. He abstained from smoking and was only a social drinker. He was a patriotic, religious introvert.

Gontermann's father, a cavalry officer, pushed him towards a career in the military. After leaving school, Heinrich enlisted into the 6th Uhlan Cavalry Regiment in Hanau on 4 August 1914. Only days after arriving in his regiment, he was sent into action.

Gontermann had a reputation for being aloof, but during his time with the Uhlans he displayed leadership abilities. He was slightly wounded in September 1914. From April to 20 May 1915, he attended a machine gun training course in Döberitz. He was then transferred to a replacement machine gun company of the Landwehr Infantry Regiment No. 80 in Mainz. There he was promoted to Unteroffizier and appointed corporal's leader (Korporalschaftsführer) with 18 subordinates on the heights of the Vosges Mountains as the outermost border post against France. While he continued to lead his men through 1915, he applied for a transfer to the newly formed German Army Air Service, and in autumn 1915, he was promoted to Vizefeldwebel. As such he was appointed deputy platoon leader in the I. Battalion. On 19 November 1915, he was promoted to Leutnant der Reserve (2nd Lieutenant of the Reserves). On 18 December 1915, after having been granted 14 days leave at home, Gontermann left the regiment.

=== Aerial service ===
Gontermann was finally accepted for pilot/observer training, and upon his graduation in early 1916 was posted to Kampfstaffel Tergnier as a reconnaissance pilot flying the Roland C.II. Later that spring he was posted to Field-Abteilung 25 where he flew both as a pilot and as an observer on AGO C.Is.

Gontermann applied for aviation training at Jastaschule and a transfer to a fighter unit. He was accepted and on 11 November 1916 joined Jasta 5. Three days later, while on his first combat sortie, he shot down his first aircraft: an FE.2b on patrol over Morval.

There was a lull in his scoring until 6 March 1917, when Gontermann shot down an FE.2d of No. 57 Squadron RFC the day after being awarded the Iron Cross First Class. He scored regularly in March, becoming an ace on the 24th by downing a Sopwith 1½ Strutter. He added a second one the following day. It was after this victory that he wrote home, "Today I shot down a two-seater.... He broke up into dust in the air.... It is a horrible job but one must do one's duty."

During Bloody April, 1917, Gontermann had 12 victories. On the 8th, he achieved his first success as a balloon buster, with all its extraordinary hazards, by downing an observation balloon. He shot down 4 others within the month, including a double victory on the 16th.

On 26 April 1917, Gontermann brought his victory total to 17 victories. Gontermann was also promoted to Staffelführer of Prussian Jagdstaffel 15 four days later. He replaced Max Reinhold, who was killed in action.

=== Gontermann as commander ===
Gontermann's personal reputation was that of an aloof man with only a few friends. Professionally, he was a student of enemy aircraft types, with a special knack for picking off his foes from point-blank range within their blind spots. He was considered the premier marksman of his unit, as well as a skilled aerobaticist. Udet wrote of Gontermann, "Before he opens fire, he defeats his enemy by outflying him. When he finally fires, he requires, at most, a dozen rounds to tear apart the other's machine." Gontermann was noted as nervous, stressed, and slept poorly. Such was the strain of combat that he was sent on a month's leave during May to recuperate. According to Udet, Gontermann once confronted a German NCO who was harassing a French girl; "Gontermann was yelling the wits out of him, calling him a swine and threatening him with a court martial."

On 6 May 1917, Gontermann was awarded the Knight's Cross with Swords of the Royal House Order of Hohenzollern. He scored his 19th triumph, over five-victory ace Didier Lecour Grandmaison, on 10 May 1917. He was aearded the Pour le Merite on 12 May 1917

Gontermann was granted four weeks leave in May–June 1917 upon receipt of the Blue Max. Upon Gontermann's return to the Jasta on 19 June, he found that acting Staffelführer Ernst Udet had requested a transfer. Under Udet's leadership the Jasta had suffered three demoralizing losses. For the remainder of June, Gontermann again targeted observation balloons, shooting down one on both the 24th and the 27th. He also scored two triumphs in July, one of which was a balloon.

August was as productive a month for Gontermann. After shooting down a Nieuport on the 5th, he shot down two balloons each on both the 9th and the 17th. 19 August saw the peak of Gontermann's career. He shot down a Spad in the morning, while at 1923 hours, he took out an observation balloon south of Aisne-Tal; three others were destroyed in as many minutes. The downing of the balloons brought his score to 35.

In September, Gontermann shot down three more enemy aircraft. By 2 October 1917, Gontermann had become a celebrated ace with 39 victories. He was credited with defeating 21 enemy aircraft and 18 balloons, plus an unconfirmed balloon shot down. He would rank eighth among balloon busting aces of the war; only Friedrich Ritter von Röth outscored him amongst German fliers.

== Death ==
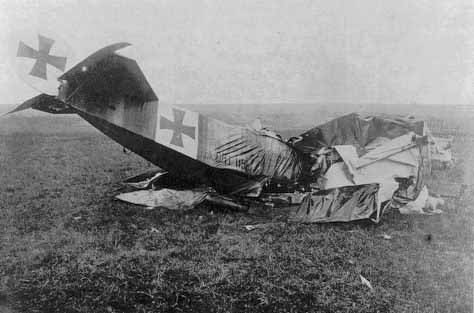
Fokker Dr.I 115/17 in which Gontermann crashed on 30 October 1917

On 30 October 1917, Gontermann took off in a Fokker Dr.I. He had not yet recovered fully from a bout of dysentery. Nevertheless, he was anxious to try his new airplane, despite misgivings about it. After a few minutes, he tried aerobatics at 700 meters altitude. He pulled out of the second loop and dived into a left turn. The upper wing collapsed and broke completely off. His airplane plunged into the ground.

Gontermann was pulled from the wreck alive, though with severe head injuries after slamming into the machine-gun breeches. Medical help from the neighboring village arrived surprisingly quickly. He was then taken to the Jasta's medical bay. Within a few hours, the army's chief physician performed an operation, but human skill could do nothing to heal the extremely severe wound. Gontermann died late that evening in the arms of his friend and comrade, also a flight lieutenant.

Gontermann was one of several German pilots killed testing the new Dr.I. As a result, Fokker was accused of shoddy construction and directed to change production methods for the manufacture of the plane.

== Awards, decorations and honours ==
- Iron Cross (1914), 2nd and 1st Class
  - 2nd Class on 27 January 1916
  - 1st Class on 5 March 1917
- Prussian Military Pilot Badge
- Honour Goblet for the Victor in Aerial Combat
- Royal House Order of Hohenzollern, Knight's Cross with Swords (HOH3X) on 6 May 1917
- Pour le Mérite on 12 May 1917
- Heinrich-Gontermann-Weg in Stuttgart-Sillenbuch named in his honour
