= Jean Loste =

French flying ace

Jean Augustin Paul Joseph Loste
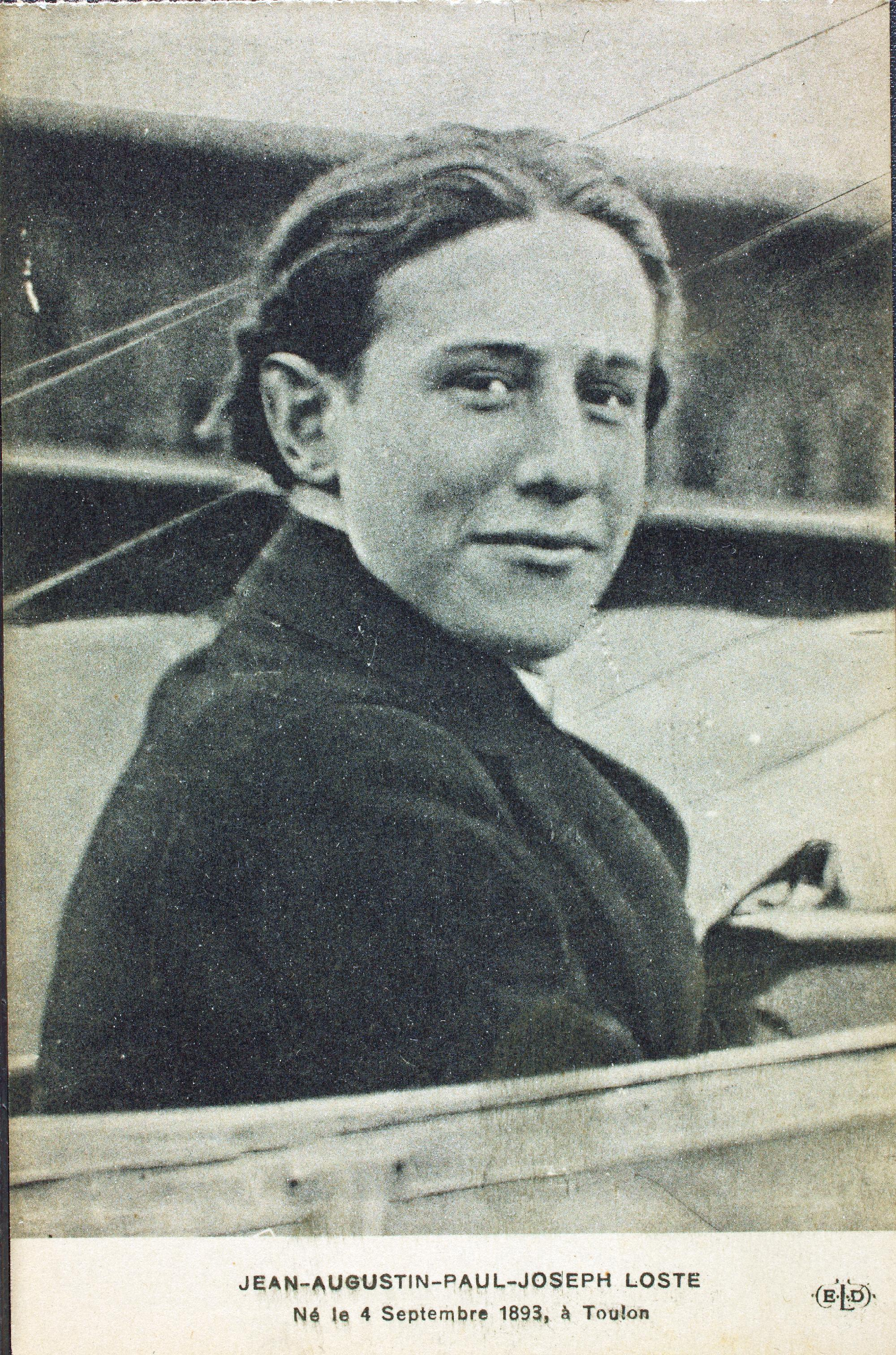
- Born: 2 September 1893; Toulon, France
- Died: 26 July 1960 (aged 66); Bordeaux, France
- Military career
- Allegiance: France
- Branch: Aviation
- Rank: Sous lieutenant (later Chef de Bataillon)
- Units: Escadrille C46; Escadrille C56
- Conflicts: World War I
- Awards: Legion d'honneur Croix de Guerre

Lieutenant Jean Augustin Paul Joseph Loste was a French World War I flying ace credited with seven aerial victories. He remained in service after World War I ended, finally retiring in 1930 at the rank of Chef de Bataillon.

== Biography ==
See also Aerial victory standards of World War I

Jean Augustin Paul Joseph Loste was born in Toulon, France, on 2 September 1893.

=== Service during World War I ===
He had a deep interest in aviation when he was in his late teens. He pursued a pilot's license, and received a Civil Pilot's Brevet on 7 November 1913. On 23 March 1914, he followed this up by earning Seaplane Pilot's Brevet No. 1. As the First World War kindled, Loste was called to military service on 10 August 1914. Although originally assigned to aviation, he was sent to the infantry on 26 September. Recalled to aviation on 2 January 1915, he began military pilot's training. On 19 April 1915, he was granted his Military Pilot's Brevet. Without additional schooling, he was posted to Escadrille C.56 just nine days later.

Loste was wounded in action on 18 June 1915. He was raised out of the enlisted ranks on 17 April 1916, being promoted to Sous lieutenant. On 20 June 1916, he was transferred to Escadrille C46.

Despite having been assigned to a squadron fitted for reconnaissance and bombing, Loste scored his first victory on 27 July 1916. The three-place Caudron G.IV he flew was sometimes used as a gunship flying protection for other bombers. At any rate, he would score six more aerial victories by 26 January 1917.

On 26 August 1917, he was removed from combat duty and transferred to the Service des Fabrications de l'Aviation. He was seriously injured on 30 September 1917. On 17 April 1918, he was promoted to lieutenant. Assigned to develop tactics on 21 August 1918, he was injured again the same day. Upon his return to duty on 23 September 1918, he was again posted to Service des Fabrications de l'Aviation, where he ended the war.

=== Service after World War I ===
Jean Loste remained in military service after World War I ended. He was promoted to Capitaine on 25 March 1926. When he retired on 1 December 1930, he received a final promotion to Chef de Bataillon.

Jean Loste died on 26 July 1960 in Bordeaux, France.

== Honors and awards ==
Chevalier de la Légion d'Honneur
"A remarkably adroit and courageous pilot; has completed numerous artillery spotting, photographic, and bombing missions during the course of which he successively downed four enemy planes. In particular, on 1 November 1916, he descended to within 150 meters of the ground to shoot down his adversary in flames in its own lines. By virtue of his coolness, he was able to recross the lines and save his plane, one motor of which had been badly damaged. Cited twice in orders." Chevalier de la Légion d'Honneur citation, 24 November 1916

During the postwar years, Loste would rise in rank in the Legion d'Honneur, becoming in succession over the years an Officier, a Commandeur, and a Grand Officier of the Legion.

During his wartime service, Lost had won the Croix de Guerre with five palms.

At some point, Japan awarded Loste the Order of the Rising Sun.
