= Caudron R.4 =

French WW1 reconnaissance aircraft

R.4 and R.5
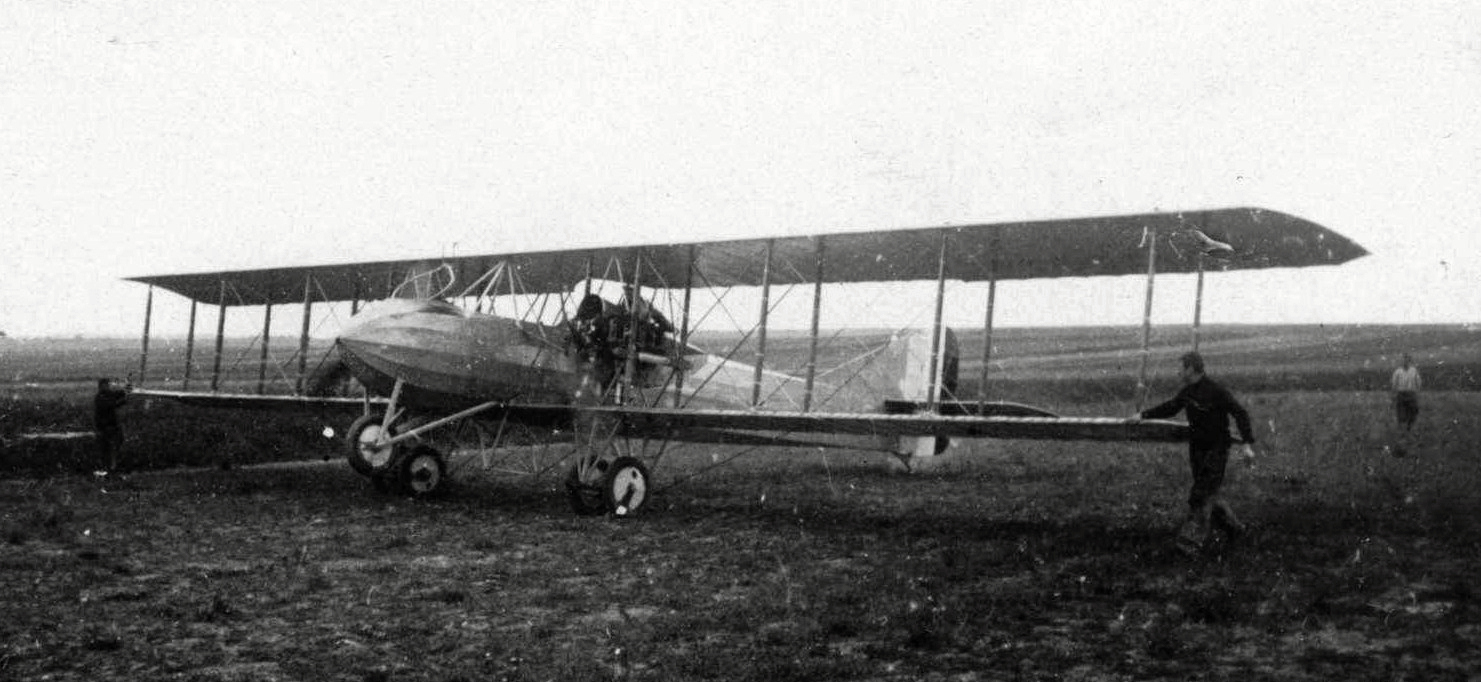

General information
- Type: Reconnaissance
- Manufacturer: Caudron
- Designer: René Caudron
- Primary user: Aéronautique Militaire
- Number built: 249 Caudron R.4 + 1 Caudron R.5

History
- Manufactured: 1916-1917
- Introduction date: October 1916
- First flight: June 1915
- Retired: 1918
- Variant: Caudron R.11

The Caudron R.4 (officially Caudron 40 A.3) was a French World War I twin-engine biplane reconnaissance/artillery cooperation aircraft and the progenitor of a series of successful aircraft that filled a variety of roles with the French Aéronautique Militaire.

== Development ==
The first prototype was completed in June 1915 however it wasn't until November that the first examples was handed over to the authorities for service evaluation when it was found to be underpowered and suffered from poor manoeuvrability and a low service ceiling, which precluded it from being used in its intended role as a bomber. While developing the aircraft, a number of crashes occurred of which the most disastrous for Caudron occurred on 12 December 1915, when Gaston Caudron was killed while testing an early production aircraft. These crashes were found to be the result of structural deficiencies, which required substantial redesign, particularly of the center-section wing spars. This redesign work was carried out by Henry Potez.

While the brothers Caudron had collaborated closely in aircraft design up to this point, the similar G.5 and G.6 were the work of Gaston Caudron, while the R.4 was by René Caudron. These were a radical departure from their increasingly obsolete predecessors, the G.3 and G.4, both of which were pod and boom designs, and were difficult to defend due to the positions of the crew. In contrast the R.4 had a streamlined, full-length fuselage and single fin and rudder, and three cockpits, with gunners ahead and behind the wings, and the pilot just behind the wing. The unequal-span wings had three bays on each side of the strut-mounted engines, and were fitted with ailerons on the upper wing only. As well as the twin-wheel main landing gear units and tailskid, the R.4 could be identified from other Caudrons by its single nose-wheel which was a common feature on French bombers and was intended to prevent nose-overs in the event of a rough landing. Its unimpressive climb rate and poor ceiling resulted in a few aircraft being tested with more powerful 150 hp (110 kW) Hispano-Suiza 8Aa engines. The new Caudron chief designer, Paul Deville, then set to work further refining the design. The result would be the Caudron R.11. Development delays meant the first aircraft didn't reach the front lines until late 1916, so that only one example was in service at the start of October.

== Operational history ==
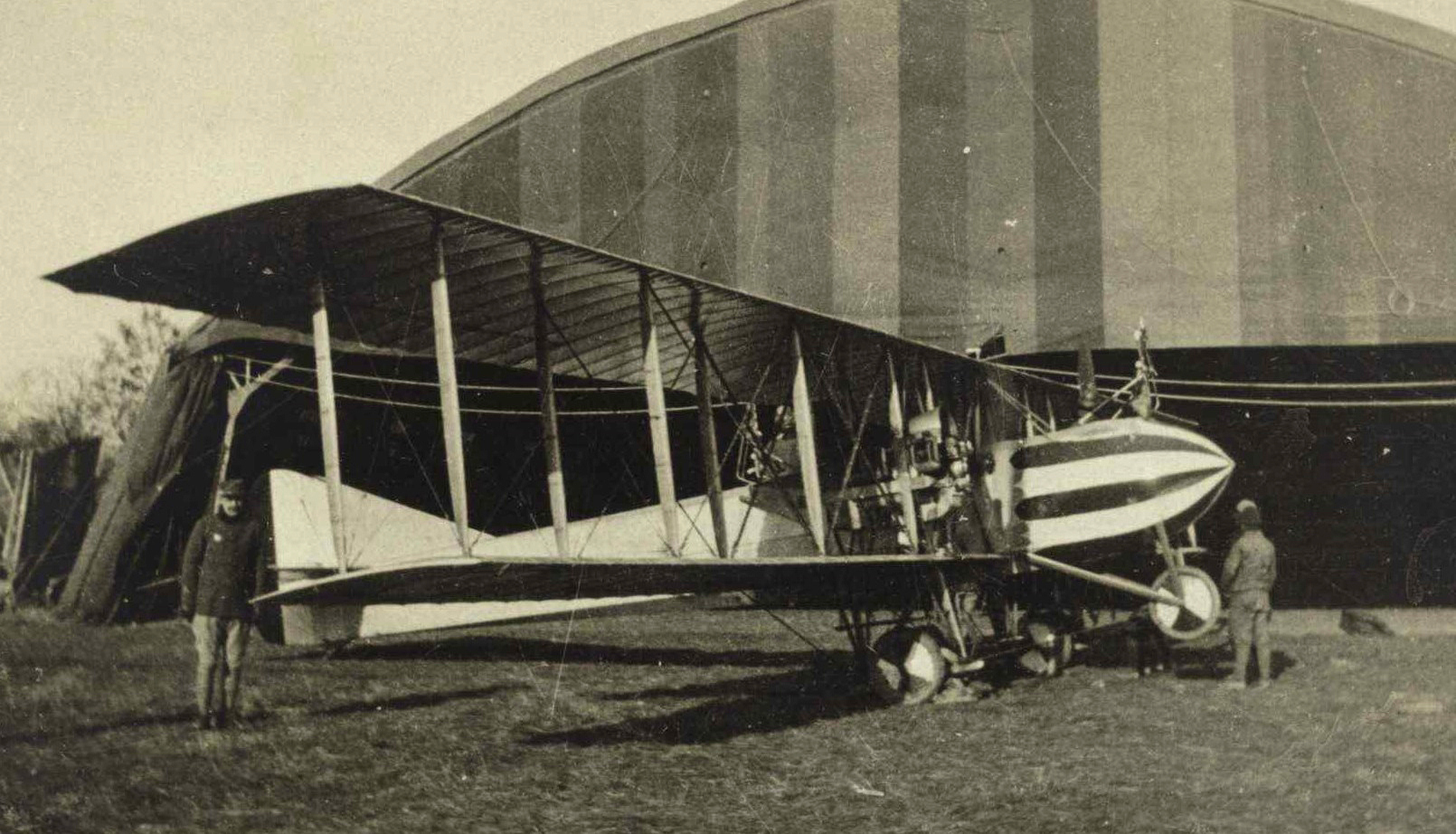
Caudron R.4 near the Somme

The R.4 performed well in the reconnaissance role and managed to shoot down a considerable number of enemy aircraft. In early use Escadrille C.46 had claimed 34 German aircraft brought down with its R.4s in an eight-week period, but it was clear that an improved ceiling and greater manoeuvrability were necessary. Production of the R.4 ended after 249 had been built. In the reconnaissance escadrilles it was progressively replaced by Sopwith 1 A.2s, SPAD XIs, Breguet 14s and Letord 1s in 1917 and 1918.

== Variants ==
Caudron R.3
precursor to R.4 powered with 80 hp (60 kW) Le Rhône 9C rotary engines.
Caudron R.4
company designation for 130 hp (97 kW) Renault 12Db-powered aircraft
Caudron 40 A.3
official STAé designation (rarely used)
Caudron R.19
unofficial SFA designation for Renault powered variant (rarely used)
Caudron R.4 type 8
unofficial/company designation for 150 hp (110 kW) Hispano-Suiza 8A powered prototype.
Caudron R.5
bomber prototype with more powerful 230 hp (170 kW) Renault 12Fa engines.

== Operators ==
France

- Aéronautique Militaire
  - Escadrille R46
  - Escadrille R207
  - Escadrille R210
  - Escadrille R212
  - Escadrille R214
  - Escadrille R217

== Specifications ==
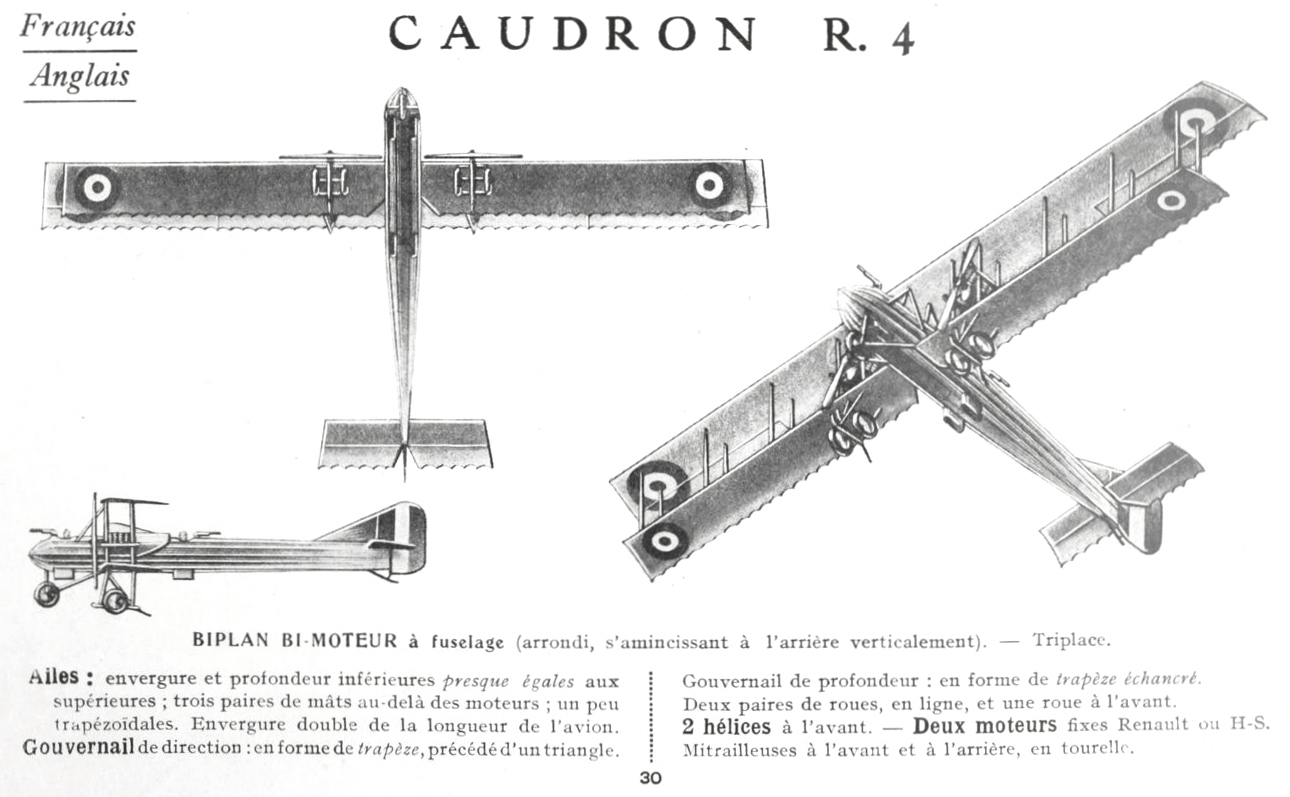
Caudron R.4 drawings

Data from Davilla (1997), p.166

General characteristics

- Crew: three
- Length: 11.80 m (38 ft 9 in)
- Wingspan: 21.10 m (69 ft 3 in)
- Height: 3.60 m (11 ft 10 in)
- Wing area: 63.16 m^{2} (679.8 sq ft)
- Empty weight: 1,720 kg (3,792 lb)
- Gross weight: 2,337 kg (5,152 lb)
- Powerplant: 2 × Renault 12Db air-cooled inline V-12, 97 kW (130 hp) each
- Propellers: 2-bladed wooden fixed-pitch two-blade propellers

Performance

- Maximum speed: 136 km/h (85 mph, 73 kn) at 2,000 m (6,600 ft)
- Range: 500 km (310 mi, 270 nmi)
- Endurance: 3 hours
- Service ceiling: 4,600 m (15,100 ft)
- Time to altitude: 18 minutes to 2,000 m (6,600 ft)

Armament

- Guns: 2 - 4 × .303 in (7.7 mm) Lewis guns on gun rings in nose and dorsal positions

== See also ==
Related development

- Caudron R.11
