= Didier Lecour Grandmaison =

French Pilot

Didier Louis Marie Charles Lecour Grandmaison
- Born: 18 May 1889; Nantes, France
- Died: 10 May 1917 (aged 27); Berry-au-Bac, France
- Military career
- Allegiance: France
- Branch: Flying service
- Service years: 1907 – 10 May 1917
- Rank: Capitaine
- Units: Escadrille C.47; Escadrille C46
- Commands: Escadrille C46
- Awards: Legion d'Honneur; Croix de Guerre

Capitaine Didier Louis Marie Charles Lecour Grandmaison (18 May 1889 – 10 May 1917) was a World War I flying ace credited with five aerial victories.

== Biography ==
Lecour Grandmaison was born in Nantes, France on 18 May 1889. In 1907, he entered Saint Cyr as a cadet. Upon graduation, he was posted to cavalry duty in 1910. He served with distinction during the early months of World War I, but transferred to aviation training is early 1915. By May 1915, he was trained. Originally flying with Escadrille C47, he was transferred to Escadrille C46. He succeeded to command of C46 in 1916. After two victories, he was made a Chevalier of the Legion of Honor on 1 October 1916. After three more victories, he was killed in action along with his two gunners on 10 May 1917. A cross-reference of French losses with German victory records shows that Lecour Grandmaison and his gunners were probably the 19th victims of German ace Heinrich Gontermann.
