= Messerschmitt Bf 109 variants =

Bayerische Flugzeugwerke Bf 109 Messerschmitt Me 109
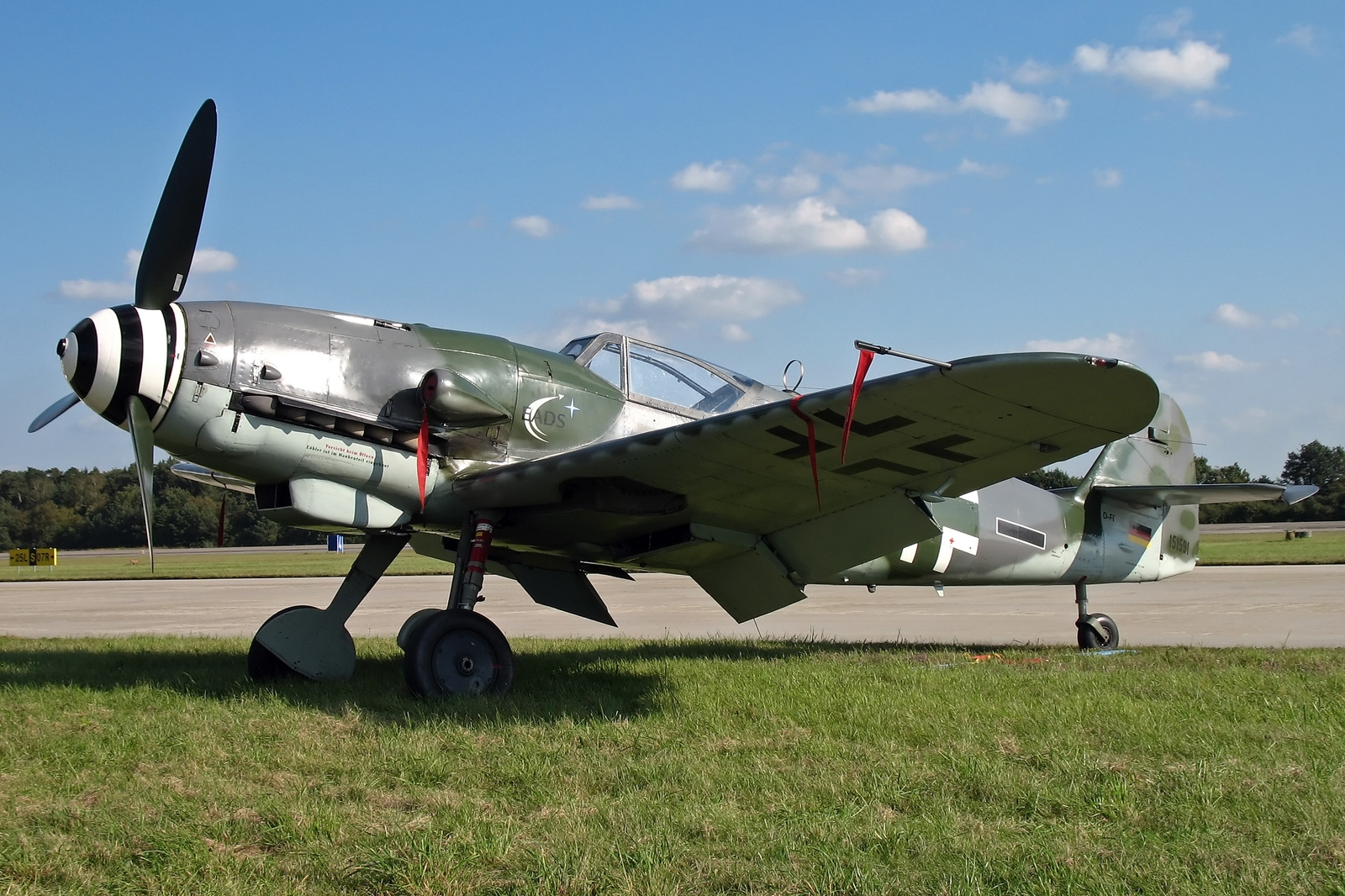
- Bf 109G-10, with Erla Haube canopy and taller, wooden fin and rudder

General information
- Type: Fighter

Due to the Messerschmitt Bf 109's versatility and time in service with the German and foreign air forces, numerous variants were produced in Germany to serve for over eight years with the Luftwaffe. Additional variants were produced abroad totalling in 34,852 Bf 109s built.

"The 109 was a dream, the non plus ultra. Of course, everyone wanted to fly it as soon as possible."

— Günther Rall, Luftwaffe ace with 275 victories.

== Bf 109 Anton ==
The Bf 109A was the first version of the Bf 109. Armament was initially planned to be just two cowl-mounted 7.92 mm (.312 in) MG 17 machine guns. However, possibly due to the introduction of the Hurricane and Spitfire, each with eight 7.7 mm (.303 in) machine guns, experiments were carried out with a third machine gun firing through the propeller shaft. V4 and some A-0 were powered by a 640 PS (631 hp, 471 kW) Junkers Jumo 210B engine driving a two-blade fixed-pitch propeller, but production was changed to the 670 PS (661 hp, 493 kW) Jumo 210D as soon as it became available. The A-0 was not of a uniform type; there were several changes in their appearance. Visible changes included engine, cockpit and machine gun ventilation holes/slats, and the location of the oil cooler was changed several times to prevent overheating. Many of these Bf 109 A-0 served with the Legion Condor and were often misidentified as B-series aircraft, and probably served in Spain with the tactical markings 6-1 to 6–16. One A-0, marked as 6–15, ran out of fuel and was forced to land behind enemy lines. It was captured by Republican troops on 11 November 1937 and later transferred to the Soviet Union for a closer inspection. 6–15 incorporated several improvements from the Bf 109B production program and had been prepared to use a variable-pitch propeller although it had not been installed.

According to RLM documentation 22 aircraft were ordered and delivered with V4 as the A-series prototype.

== Bf 109 Berta ==
The first Bf 109 in serial production was the Bf 109B. The first modification, the B-1, was fitted with the 670 PS (661 hp, 493 kW) Jumo 210D engine driving a two-bladed fixed-pitch propeller. During the production run a variable-pitch propeller was introduced and often retrofitted to older aircraft; these were then unofficially known as B-2s.

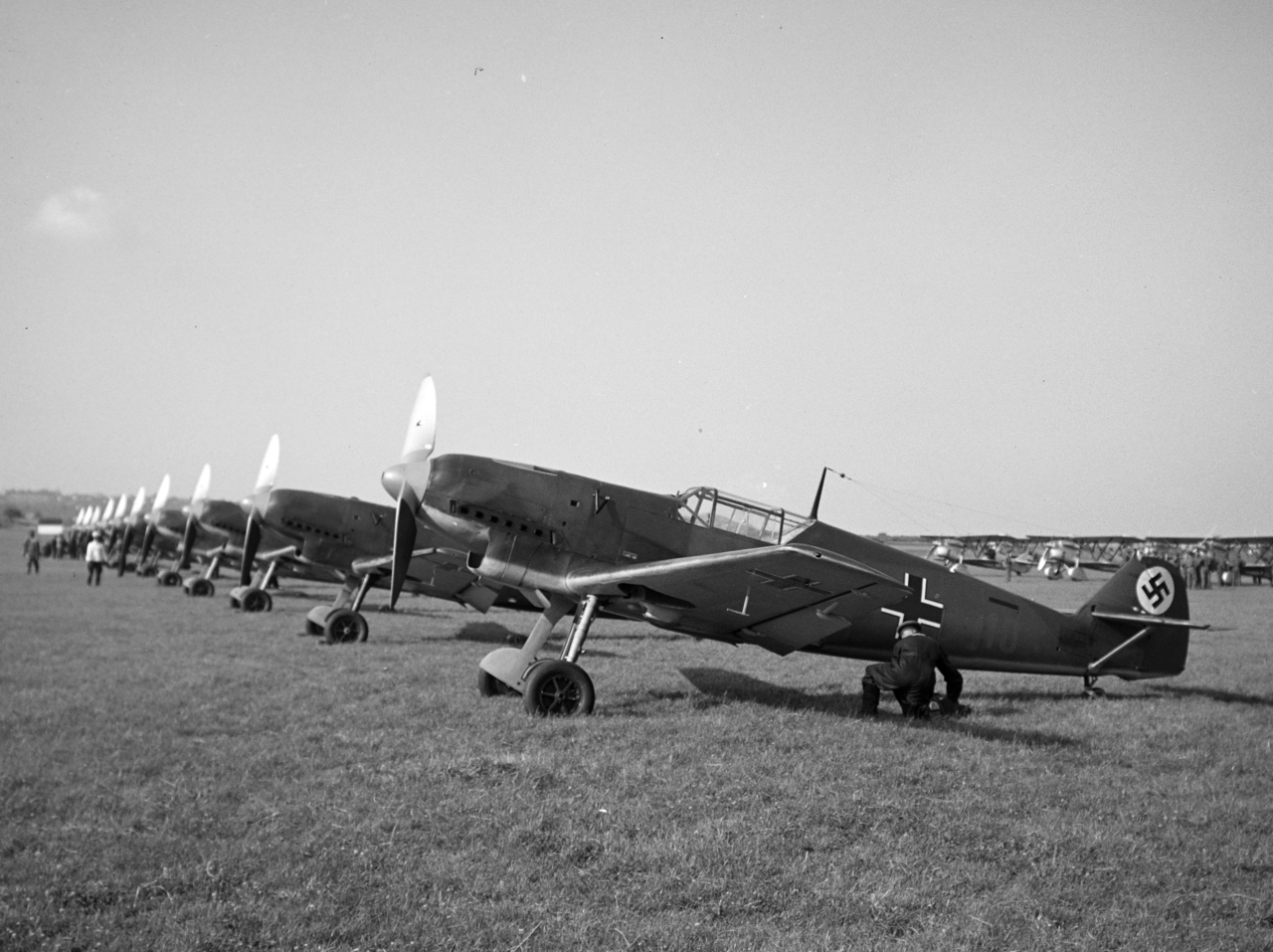
Bf 109B-1:s at Budaörs Airport, 1937

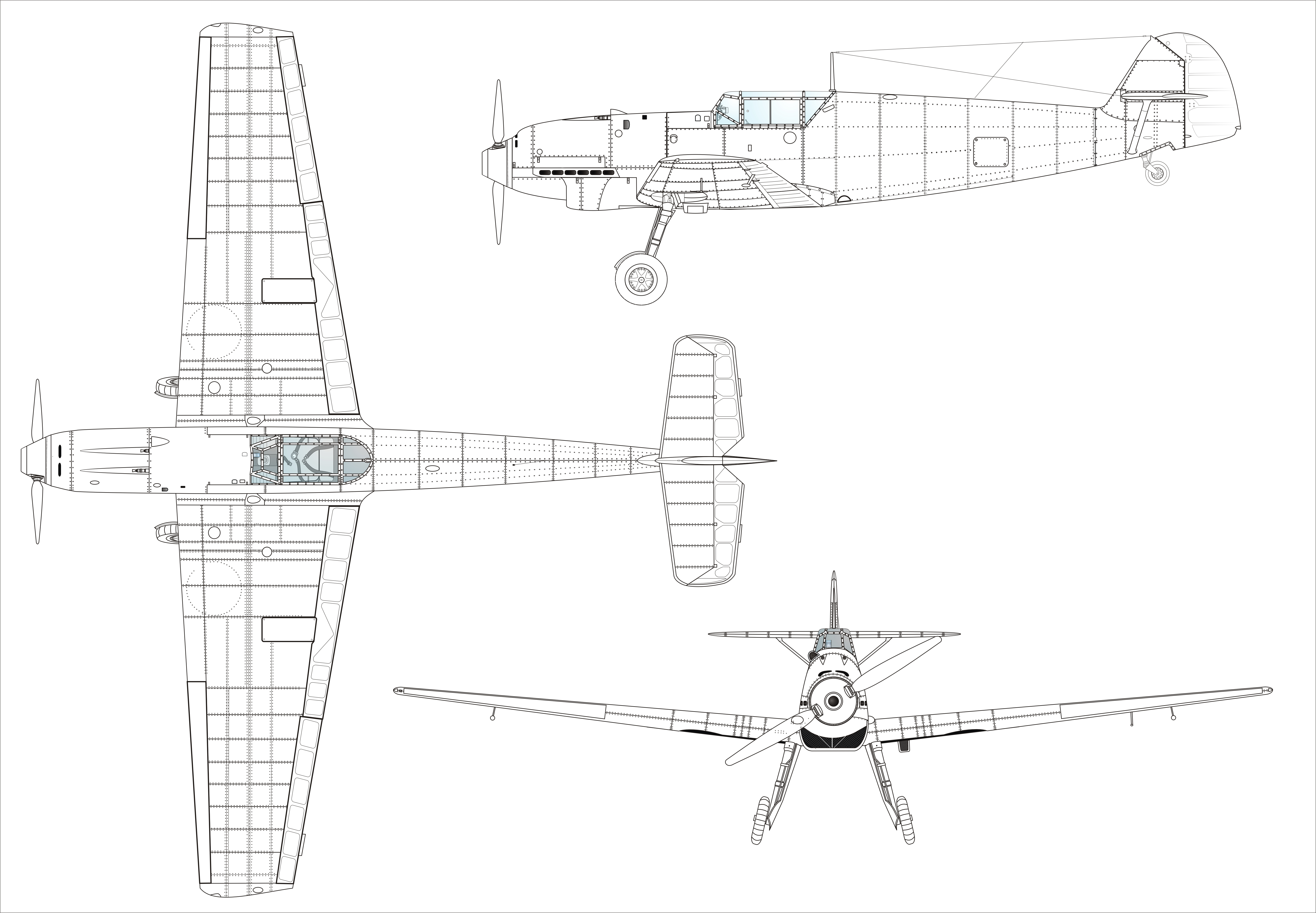
Bf 109B-2

The Bf 109B saw combat with the Legion Condor during the Spanish Civil War, although it was apparent that the armament was still inadequate. Several aircraft were produced with an engine-mounted machine gun but it was very unreliable, most likely because of engine vibrations and overheating. Thus the Bf 109 V8 was constructed to test the fitting of two more machine guns in the wings; however, results showed that the wing needed strengthening. In the following V9 prototype, both wing guns were replaced by 20 mm MG FF cannons.

A total of 341 Bf 109 B-1s were built by Messerschmitt, Fieseler, and the Erla Maschinenwerke.

== Bf 109 Caesar ==
Production of the short-lived Bf 109C began in the spring of 1938. The 109C was powered by a 700 PS (690 hp, 515 kW) Jumo 210G engine with direct fuel injection. Another important change was a strengthened wing, now carrying two more machine guns, giving four 7.92 mm (.312 in) MG 17s in total. The C-0s were pre-production aircraft, the C-1 was the production version, and the C-2 was an experimental version with an engine-mounted machine gun. The C-3 was planned with 20 mm MG FF cannons replacing the two MG 17s in the wings, but it is not known how many C-3s (if any) were built or converted. The C-4 was planned to have an MG FF engine gun (German: Motorkanone), but this variant was not produced.

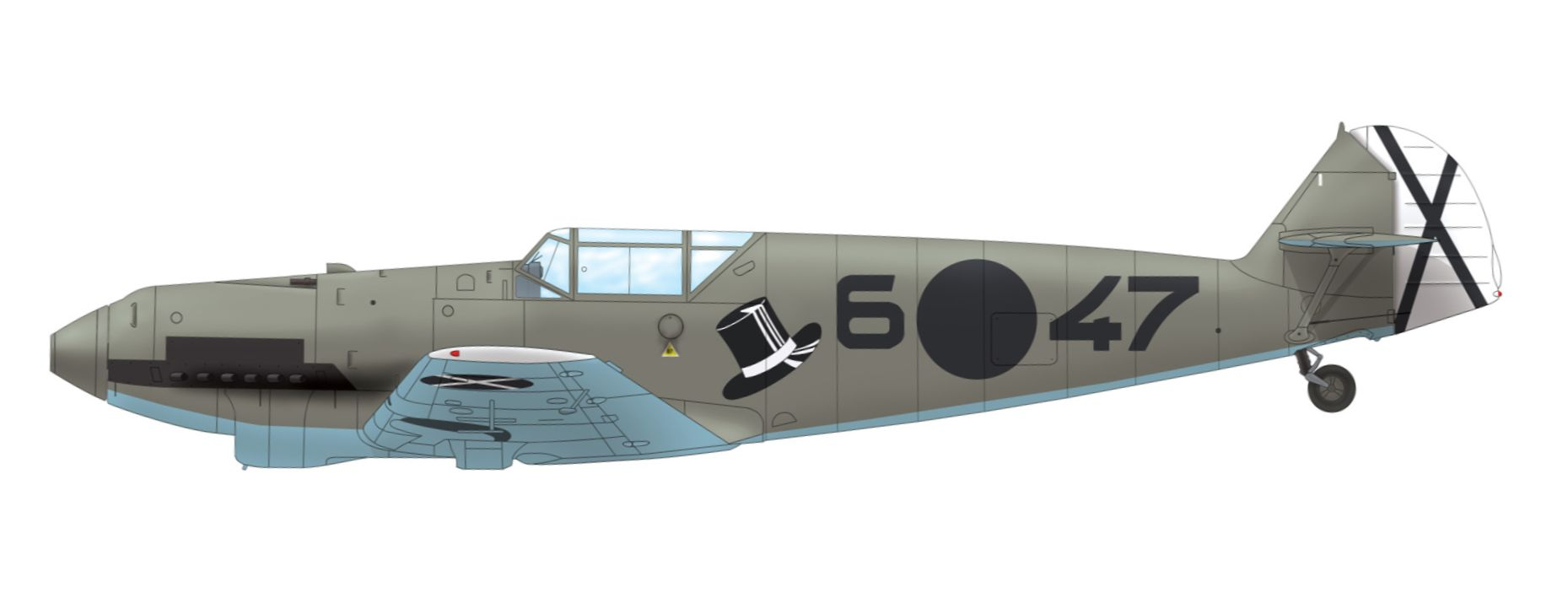
Bf 109C-1, 6-47, 1.J/88 Legion Condor, Spring 1938

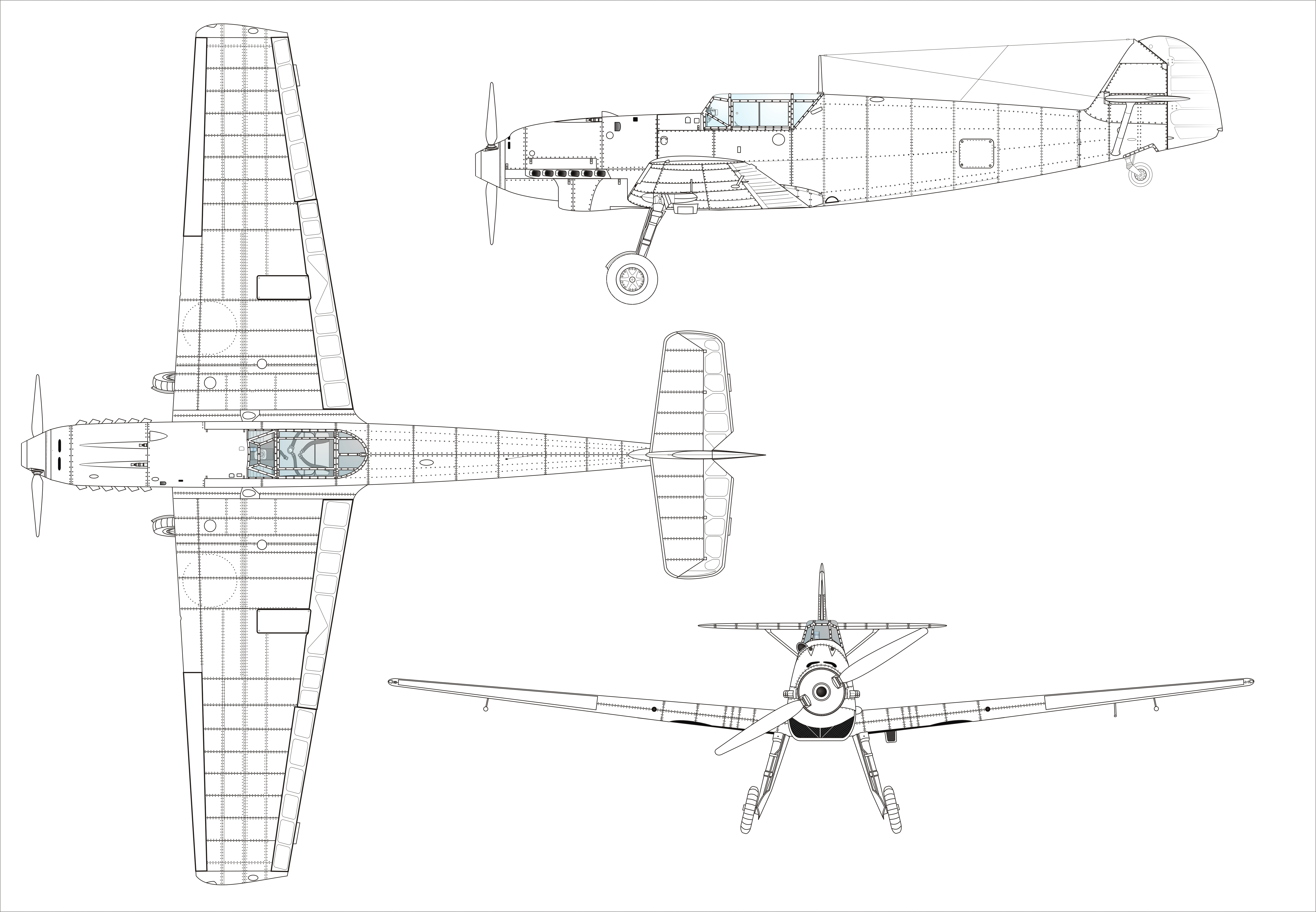
Bf 109C-1

A total of 58 Bf 109Cs of all versions were built by Messerschmitt.

== Bf 109 Dora ==
The next model, the V10 prototype, was identical to the V8, except for its Jumo 210G engine. The V10, V11, V12 and V13 prototypes were built using Bf 109B airframes, and tested the DB 600A engine with the hope of increasing the performance of the aircraft. The DB 600A was dropped as the improved DB601A with direct fuel injection was soon to become available.

Developed from the V10 and V13 prototypes, the Bf 109D was the standard version of the Bf 109 in service with the Luftwaffe just before the start of World War II. Despite this, the type saw only limited service during the war, as all of the 235 Bf 109Ds still in Luftwaffe service at the beginning of the Polish Campaign were rapidly taken out of service and replaced by the Bf 109E, except in some night fighter units where some examples were used into early 1940. Variants included the D-0 and D-1 models, both having a Junkers Jumo 210D engine and armed with two wing-mounted and two nose-mounted 7.92 mm (.312 in) MG 17s. The D-2 was an experimental version with an engine-mounted machine gun, but as previously tried, this installation failed. The D-3 was similar to the C-3 but with two 20 mm MG FFs in the wings.

A total of 647 Bf 109Ds of all versions were built by Focke-Wulf, Erla, Fieseler, Arado and AGO. Messerschmitt is listed as having produced only four Bf 109Ds, probably the D-0 preproduction series with the serial production transferred to the licensed manufacturers. 3 Bf 109Ds were sold to Hungary. Switzerland bought 10 109D-1s (Serial Numbers from 2301 until 2310) which had been built by the Arado-Flugzeugwerke GmbH factory located in Warnemünde.

== Bf 109 Emil ==
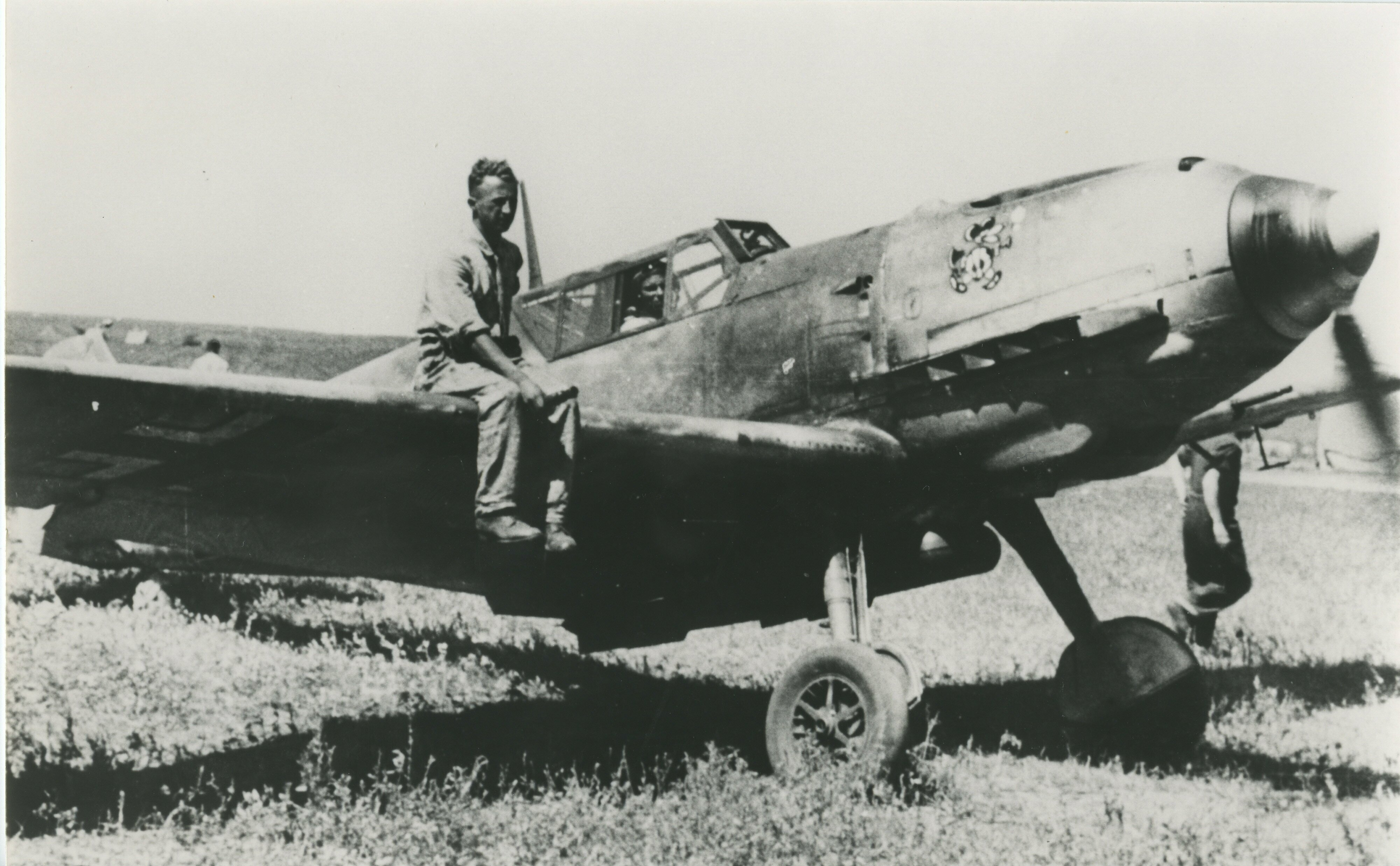
Bf 109E of Lehrgeschwader 2.

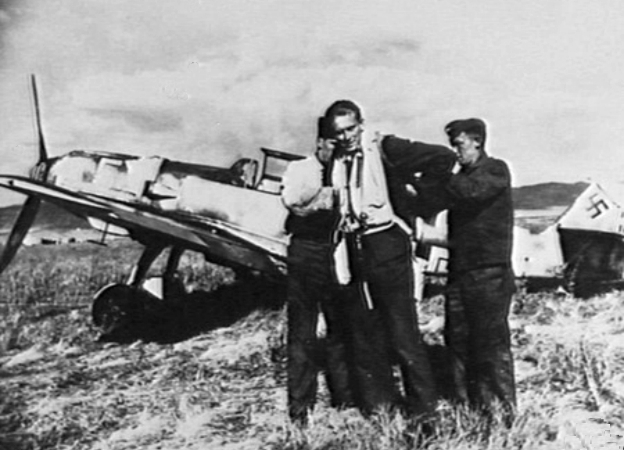
Erbo Graf von Kageneck (67 enemy aircraft shot) in front of his Messerschmitt Me 109E in Sicily in 1941, with ground crew

=== E-0, E-1 ===
In late 1938, the Bf 109E entered production. To improve on the performance afforded by the 441–515 kW (600–700 PS) Jumo 210, the larger, longer Daimler-Benz DB 601A engine was used, yielding an extra 223 kW (300 PS) at the cost of an additional 181 kg (400 lb). A much bigger cooling area was needed to disperse the extra heat generated by the DB 601, and this led to the first major redesign of the basic airframe. Enlarging the existing nose-mounted radiator sufficiently to cool the engine would have created extra weight and drag, negating some of the performance gains afforded by the increased power, so it was decided to move the main radiators to the undersurfaces of the wings immediately outboard of the junction of the wing root and wing panel, just forward of the trailing edges' inner ends, leaving the oil cooler under the nose in a small, streamlined duct. The new radiator position also had the effect of counterbalancing the extra weight and length of the DB 601, which drove a heavier three-bladed Vereinigte Deutsche Metallwerke (VDM)-made propeller.

To incorporate the new radiators, the wings were almost completely redesigned and reinforced, with several inboard ribs behind the spar being cut down to make room for the radiator ducting. Because the radiators were mounted near the trailing edge of the wing, coinciding with the increased speed of the airflow accelerating around the wing camber, cooling was more effective than that of the Jumo engined 109s, albeit at the cost of extra ducting and piping, which was vulnerable to damage. The lowered undercarriage could throw up mud and debris on wet airfields, potentially clogging the radiators. To test the new 1,100 PS (1,085 hp, 809 kW) DB 601A engine, two more prototypes (V14 and V15) were built, each differing in their armament. While the V14 was armed with two 7.92 mm (.312 in) MG 17s above the engine and one 20 mm MG FF in each wing, the V15 was just fitted with the two MG 17s mounted above the engine. After test fights, the V14 was considered more promising and a pre-production batch of 10 E-0 was ordered. Batches of both E-1 and E-3 variants were shipped to Spain for evaluation, and first saw combat during the final phases of the Spanish Civil War.

The E-1 production version kept two 7.92 mm (.312 in) MG 17s above the engine and two more in the wings. Later, many were modified to the E-3 armament standard. The E-1/B was a small batch of E-1s that became the first operational Bf 109 fighter bomber, or Jagdbomber (usually abbreviated to Jabo). These were fitted with an ETC 500 bomb rack, carrying either one 250 kg (550 lb) bomb or four 50 kg (110 lb) bombs. The E-1 was also fitted with the Reflexvisier "Revi" gunsight. Communications equipment was the FuG 7 Funkgerät 7 (radio set) short-range radio apparatus, effective to ranges of 48–56 km (30–35 mi). A total of 1,183 E-1 were built, 110 of them were E-1/B.

=== E-2 ===
Only very limited numbers of the E-2 variant were built, for which the V20 prototype served as basis. It was armed with two wing-mounted MG FFs, and one MG FF engine gun (German: Motorkanone), which gave considerable trouble in service, as well as two synchronized MG 17s cowl machine guns. In August 1940, II./JG 27 was operating this type.

=== E-3, E-4 ===
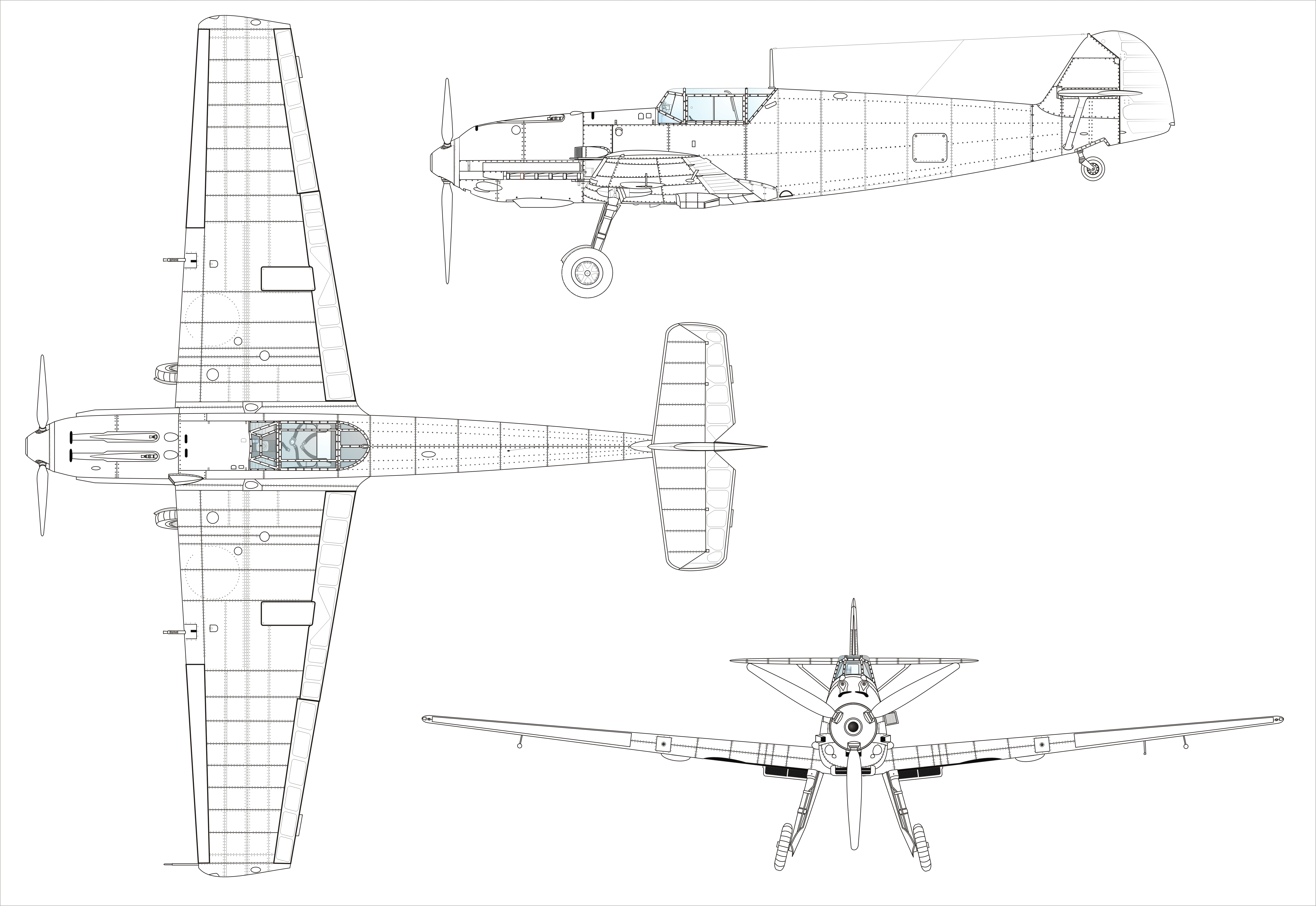
Bf 109E-3

To improve the performance of the Bf 109E, the last two real prototypes (V16 and V17) were constructed. These received some structural improvements and more powerful armament. Both were the basis of the Bf 109 E-3 version. The E-3 was armed with the two MG 17s above the engine and one MG FF cannon in each wing. A total of 1,276 E-3 were built, including 83 E-3a export versions.

The E-3 was replaced by the E-4 (with many airframes being upgraded to E-4 standards starting at the beginning of the Battle of Britain), which was different in some small details, most notably by using the modified 20 mm MG-FF/M wing cannon and having improved head armour for the pilot. With the MG FF/M, it was possible to fire a new and improved type of explosive shell, called mine shell (Minengeschoß), which was made using drawn steel (the same way brass cartridges are made) instead of being cast, as was the usual practice. This resulted in a shell with a thin but strong wall, which had a larger cavity in which to pack a much larger explosive charge than was otherwise possible. The new shell required modifications to the MG FF's mechanism due to the different recoil characteristics, hence the MG FF/M designation. The cockpit canopy was also revised to an easier-to-produce, "squared-off" design, which also helped improve the pilot's field of view. This canopy, which was also retrofitted to many E-1s and E-3s, was largely unchanged until the introduction of a welded, heavy-framed canopy on the G series in the autumn of 1942. The E-4 would be the basis for all further Bf 109E developments. Some E-4 and later models received a further improved 1,175 PS (1,159 hp, 864 kW) DB601N high-altitude engine; known as the E-4/N; owing to priority being given to equipping Bf 110s with this engine, one fighter gruppe was converted to this version, starting in July 1940. The E-4 was also available as a fighter-bomber with equipment very similar to the previous E-1/B. It was known as E-4/B (DB 601Aa engine) and E-4/BN (DB 601N engine). A total of 561 of all E-4 versions were built, including 496 E-4s built as such: 250 E-4, 211 E-4/B, 15 E-4/N and 20 E-4/BN.

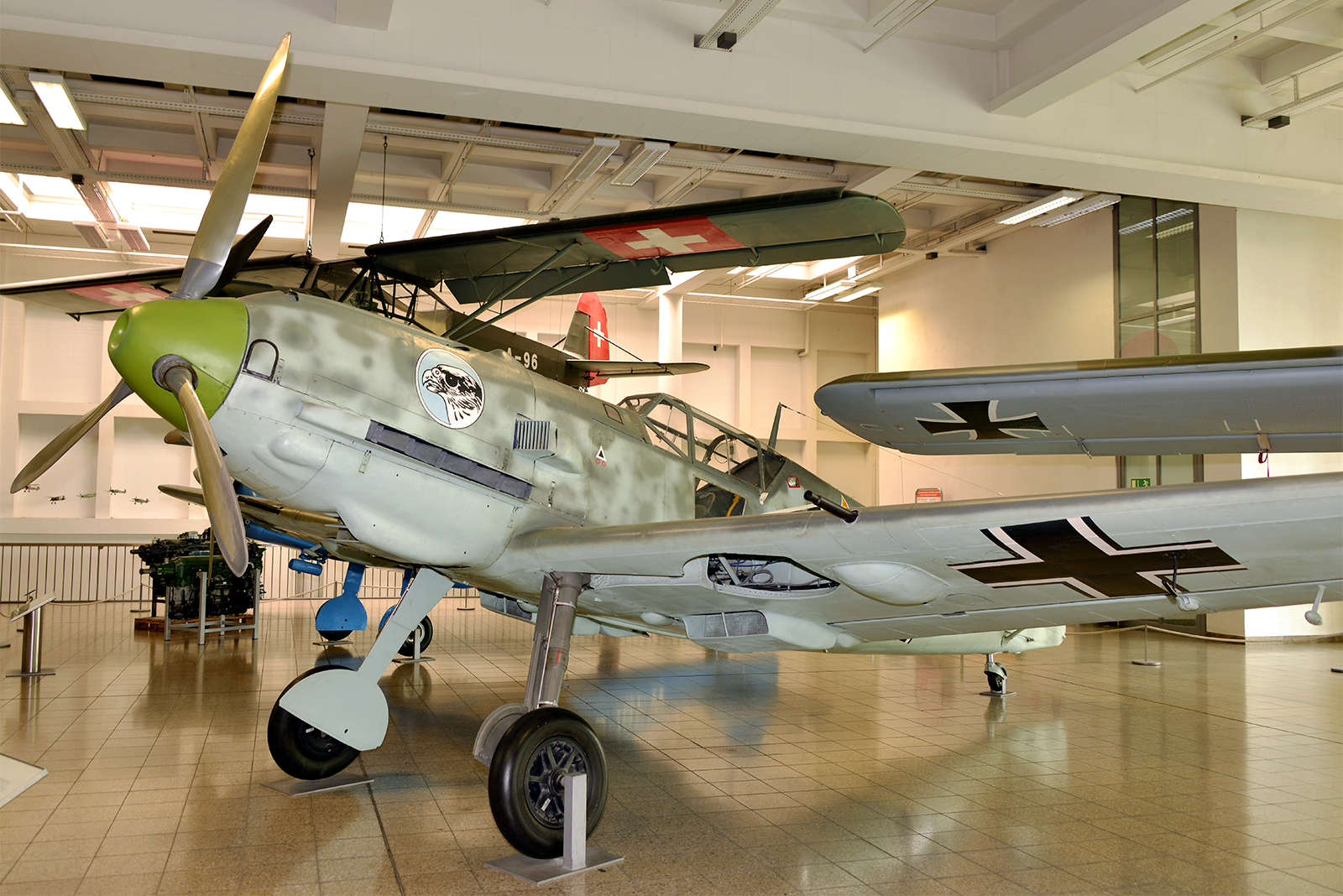
Bf 109E-3, JG 51 Mölders

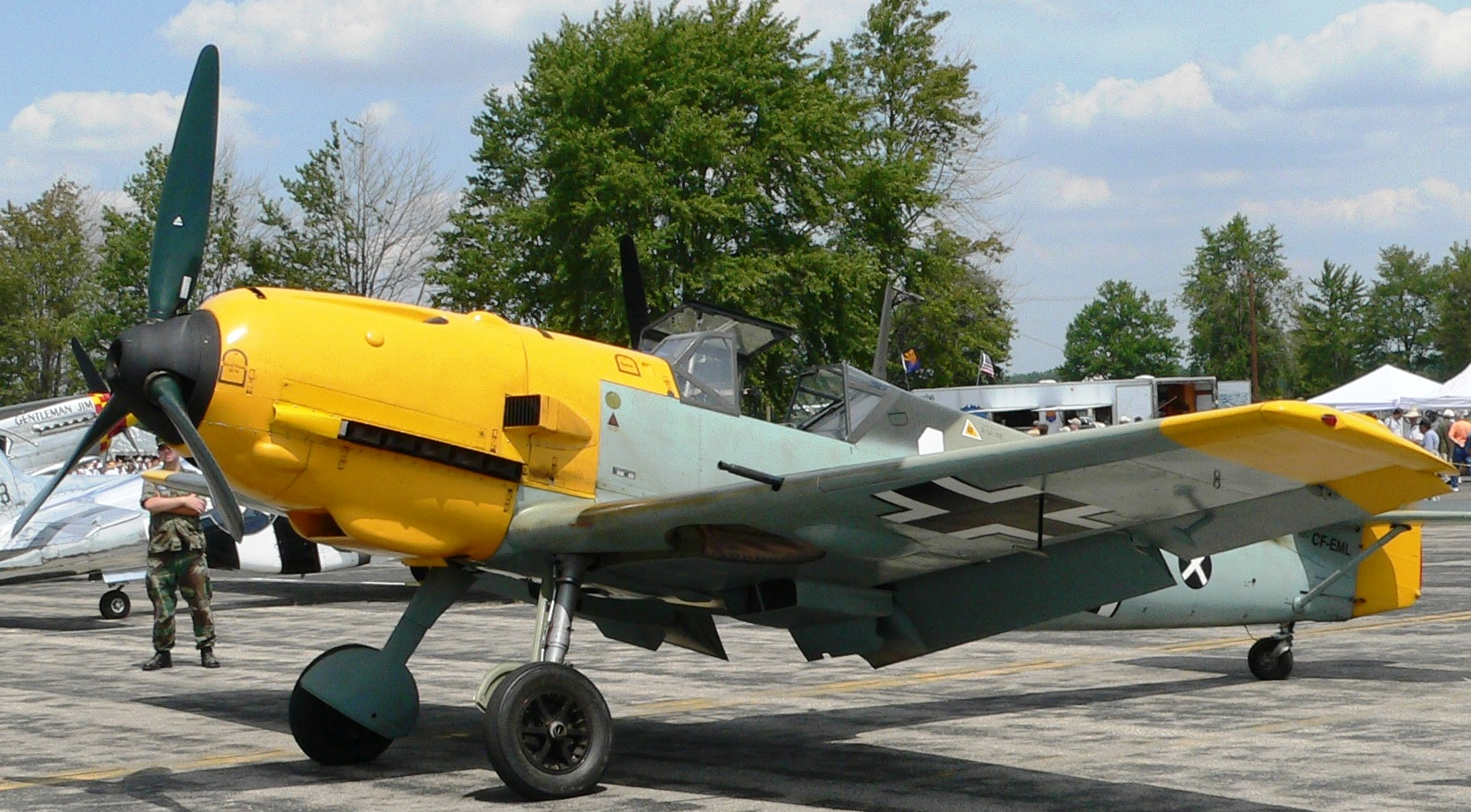
Bf 109E-4

=== E-5, E-6 ===
The E-5 and E-6 were both reconnaissance variants with a camera installation behind the cockpit. The E-5 was a reconnaissance variant of the E-3, the E-6 was a reconnaissance variant of the E-4/N. Twenty-nine E-5s were built and nine E-6s were ordered.

=== E-7 ===
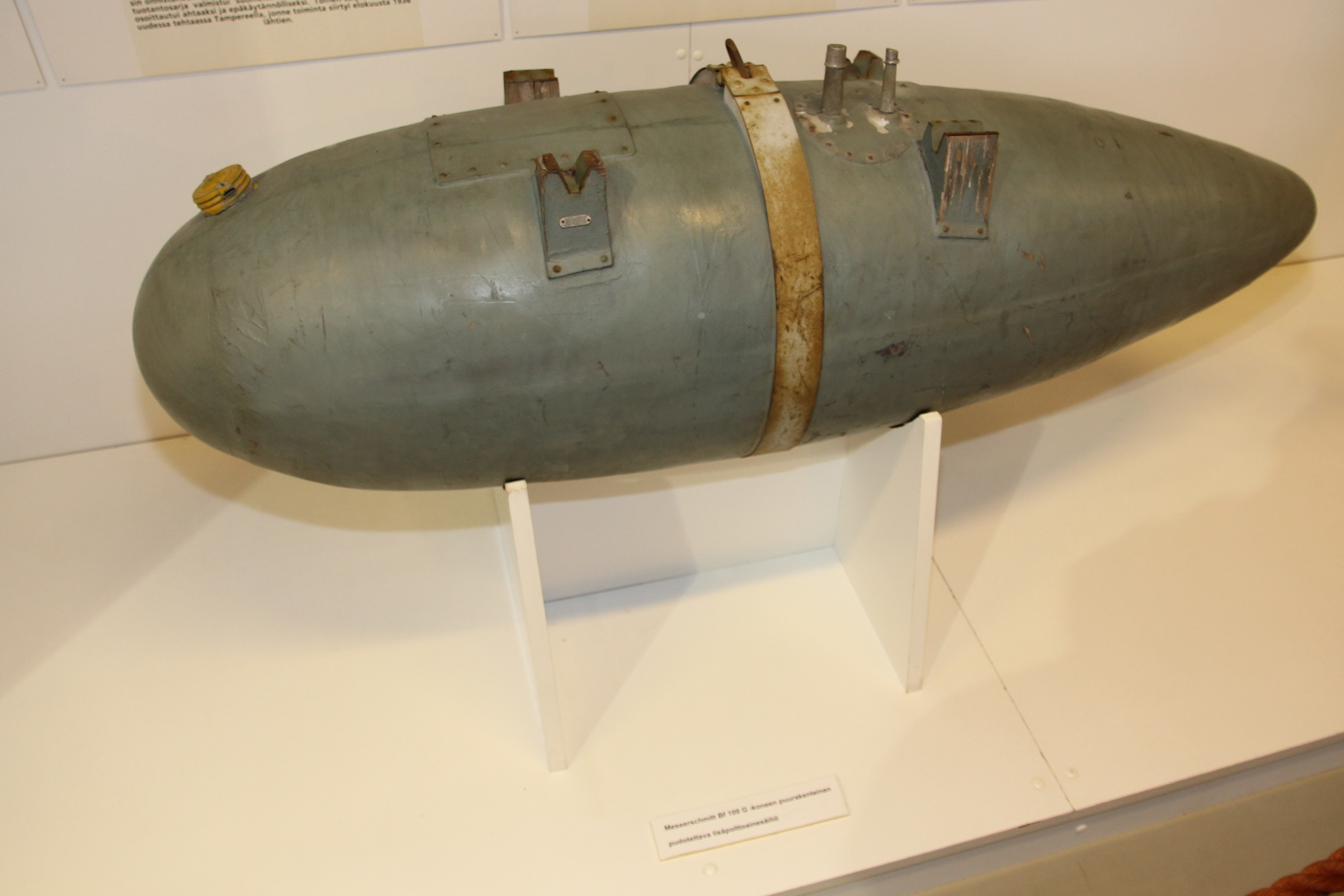
A standard Luftwaffe 300-litre drop tank

The E-7 was the next major production variant, entering service and seeing combat at the end of August 1940. One of the limitations of the earlier Bf 109Es was their short range of 660 km (410 mi) and limited endurance, as the design was originally conceived as a short-range interceptor. The E-7 rectified this problem as it was the first Bf 109 subtype to be able to carry a drop tank, usually the standardized Luftwaffe 300 L (80 US gal) capacity unit mounted on a centre-line rack under the fuselage, which increased its range to 1,325 km (820 mi). Fuel from the drop tank was pumped to the internal fuel tank via a large fuel line that ran up and along the inside starboard wall of the cockpit, with a clear sight glass located in the fuel line's main span so the pilot could easily see the flow of fuel and know when the tank was empty. Alternatively, a bomb could be fitted and the E-7 could be used as a Jabo fighter-bomber. Previous Emil subtypes were progressively retrofitted with the necessary fittings for carrying a drop tank from October 1940. Early E-7s were fitted with the 1,100 PS DB 601A or 1,175 PS DB 601Aa engine, while late-production ones received 1,175 PS DB 601N engines with improved altitude performance – the latter was designated as E-7/N. A total of 438 E-7s of all variants were built.

=== E-8, E-9 ===
The second to last model, the E-8, was a long-range version of the E-1 using the drop tank installation of E-7.

The last model, the E-9, was a reconnaissance variant of the E-7/N, featuring a drop tank, camera equipment and only two 7.92 mm MG 17 machine guns.

=== List of Emil variants ===
Bf 109E variants and sub-variants
Model	Armament	Payloads	Engine	Role	Notes
E-0	4 × 7.92 mm MG 17	–	DB 601A-1	Fighter	Pre-production aircraft
E-1	4 × 7.92 mm MG 17	–	DB 601A-1	Fighter	Production aircraft
E-1/B	4 × 7.92 mm MG 17	1 × 250 kg (550 lb) bomb 4 × 50 kg (110 lb) bomb	DB 601Aa	Fighter-bomber	Fighter-bomber version of E-1, usually with DB 601Aa
E-2	2 × 7.92 mm MG 17; 3 × 20 mm MG FF	–	DB 601A-1	Fighter	Limited production with engine cannon, otherwise as E-3
E-3	2 × 7.92 mm MG 17; 2 × 20 mm MG FF	–	DB 601Aa	Fighter	Similar to E-1 but with the wing guns switched to cannons
E-4	2 × 7.92 mm MG 17; 2 × 20 mm MG FF/M	–	DB 601Aa	Fighter	Armour and structural improvements, "square" canopy, switch to MG FF/M cannons
E-4 trop	2 × 7.92 mm MG 17; 2 × 20 mm MG FF/M	–	DB 601Aa	Tropical fighter	E-4 modified to serve in tropical regions
E-4/B	2 × 7.92 mm MG 17; 2 × 20 mm MG FF/M	1 × 250 kg (550 lb) bomb 4 × 50 kg (110 lb) bomb	DB 601Aa	Fighter-bomber	Fighter-bomber version of E-4, usually with DB 601Aa
E-4/N	2 × 7.92 mm MG 17; 2 × 20 mm MG FF/M	–	DB 601N	Fighter	E-4 with DB601N engine
E-4/BN	2 × 7.92 mm MG 17; 2 × 20 mm MG FF/M	1 × 250 kg (550 lb) bomb 4 × 50 kg (110 lb) bomb	DB 601N	Fighter-bomber	Fighter-bomber version of E-4/N
E-5	2 × 7.92 mm MG 17	–	DB 601Aa	Recce fighter	Recon version of E-3 with camera equipment
E-6	2 × 7.92 mm MG 17	–	DB 601N	Recce fighter	Recon version of E-4/N with camera equipment
E-7	2 × 7.92 mm MG 17; 2 × 20 mm MG FF/M	300 L (79 US gal) drop tank	DB 601Aa	Fighter	Similar to E-4 but with optional drop tank
E-7/N	2 × 7.92 mm MG 17; 2 × 20 mm MG FF/M	300 L (79 US gal) drop tank	DB 601N	Fighter	Similar to E-4/N but with optional drop tank
E-7/Z	2 × 7.92 mm MG 17; 2 × 20 mm MG FF/M	–	DB 601Aa	Fighter	E-7 with additional GM-1 nitrous oxide injection system
E-7/NZ	2 × 7.92 mm MG 17; 2 × 20 mm MG FF/M	300 L (79 US gal) drop tank	DB 601N	Fighter	E-7/N with additional GM-1 nitrous oxide injection system
E-7/U2	2 × 7.92 mm MG 17; 2 × 20 mm MG FF/M	1 × 250 kg (550 lb) bomb 4 × 50 kg (110 lb) bomb	DB 601N	Attacker	Ground attack variant of E-7/N with additional armour
E-8	4 × 7.92 mm MG 17	300 L (79 US gal) drop tank	DB 601A-1	Long-range fighter	Long-range version of E-1 using drop tank installation of E-7
E-9	2 × 7.92 mm MG 17	300 L (79 US gal) drop tank	DB 601N	Recce fighter	Recon version of E-7/N with drop tank and camera equipment

== Bf 109 Friedrich ==
=== Prototypes ===
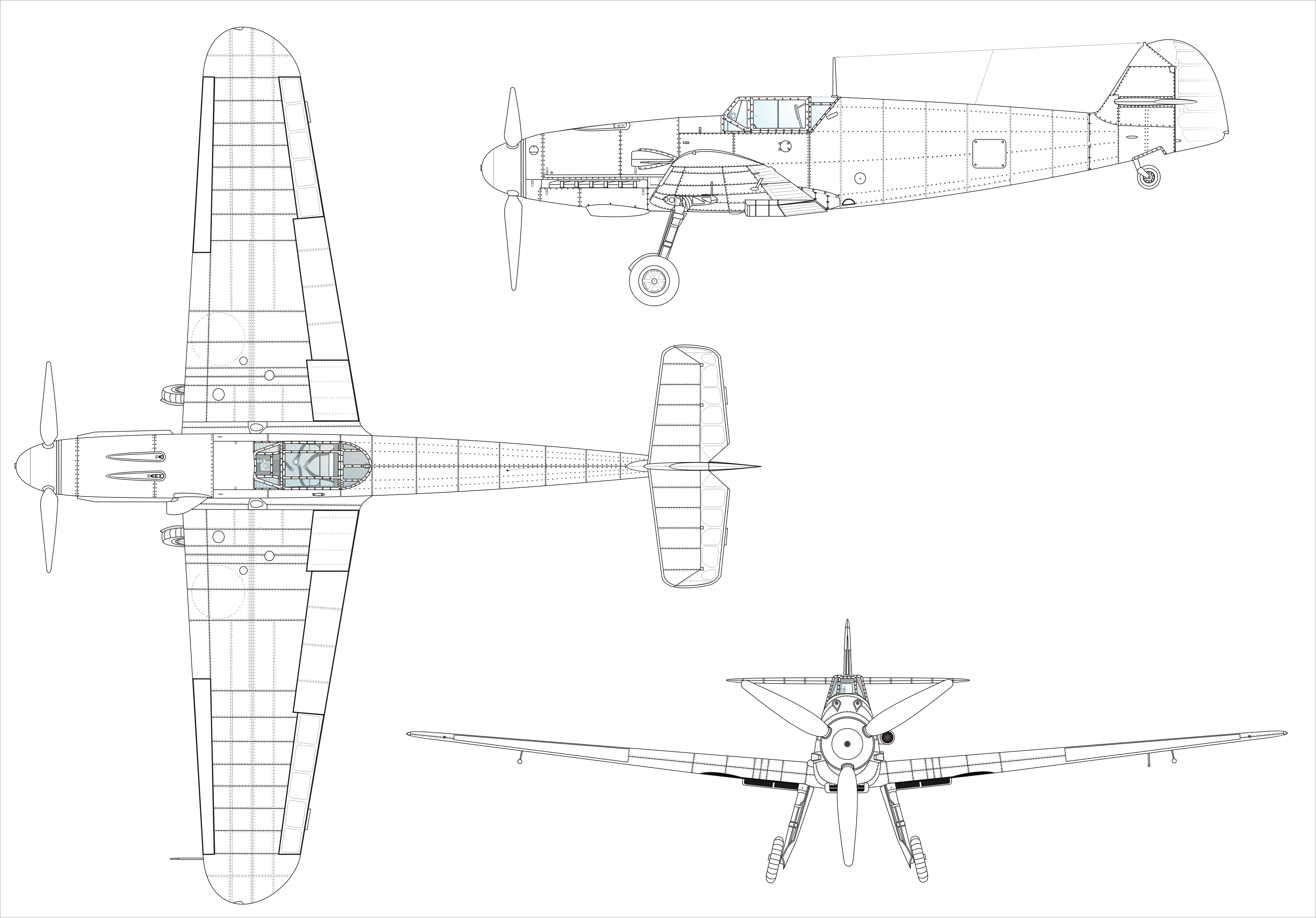
Messerschmitt Bf 109 F-2

Development of the new Bf 109F airframe had begun in 1939. After February 1940, an improved engine, the Daimler-Benz DB 601E, was developed for use with the Bf 109. The engineers at the Messerschmitt facilities took two Bf 109 E-1 airframes and installed this new powerplant. The first two prototypes, V21 (Werknummer (Works number) or W.Nr 5602) and V22 (W.Nr 1800) kept the trapeziform wing shape from the E-1, but the span was reduced by 61 cm (2 ft) by "clipping" the tips. Otherwise the wings incorporated the cooling system modifications described below. V22 also became the testbed for the pre-production DB 601E.

The smaller wings had a detrimental effect on the handling so V23, Stammkennzeichen (factory code) CE+BP, W.Nr 5603, was fitted with new, semi-elliptical wingtips, becoming the standard wing planform for all future Bf 109 combat versions. (Note: These factory codes were used by all second line aircraft, such as trainers, communication, some Air Service aircraft and others not engaged in operational use.Stammkennzeichen) The fourth prototype, V24 VK+AB, W.Nr 5604, flew with the clipped wings but featured a modified, "elbow"-shaped supercharger air-intake, which was eventually adopted for production, and a deeper oil cooler bath beneath the cowling. On all of these prototypes, the fuselage was cleaned up and the engine cowling modified to improve aerodynamics.

=== Aerodynamic improvements ===
Compared to the earlier Bf 109 E, the Bf 109 F was much improved aerodynamically. The engine cowling was redesigned to be smoother and more rounded. The enlarged propeller spinner, adapted from that of the new Messerschmitt Me 210, blended smoothly into the new cowling. Underneath the cowling was a revised, more streamlined oil cooler radiator and fairing. A new ejector exhaust arrangement was incorporated, and on later aircraft a metal shield was fitted over the left hand banks to deflect exhaust fumes away from the supercharger air-intake. The supercharger air-intake was, from the F-1 -series onwards, a rounded, "elbow"-shaped design that protruded further out into the airstream. A new three-blade, light-alloy VDM propeller with a reduced diameter of 3 m (9 ft 10 in) was used. Propeller pitch was changed electrically, and was regulated by a constant-speed unit, with a manual override. Thanks to the improved aerodynamics, more fuel-efficient engines and the introduction of light-alloy versions of the standard Luftwaffe 300 L (66 imp gal; 79 US gal) drop tank, the Bf 109 F offered a much increased maximum range of 1,700 km (1,100 mi) compared to the Bf 109 E's maximum range figure of 660 km (410 mi) on internal fuel and with the E-7 with a 300 L (66 imp gal; 79 US gal) drop tank, double the range, to 1,325 km (823 mi).

The canopy stayed much the same as that of the E-4, although the handbook for the 'F' stipulated that the forward, lower triangular panel to starboard was to be replaced by a metal panel with a port for firing signal flares. Many F-1s and F-2s kept this section glazed. A two-piece, all-metal armour plate head shield was added, as on the E-4, to the hinged portion of the canopy, although some lacked the curved top section. A bullet-resistant windscreen could be fitted as an option. The fuel tank was self-sealing and around 1942, Bf 109 Fs were retrofitted with additional armour made from layered light-alloy plate just aft of the pilot and fuel tank. The fuselage body aft of the canopy barely changed in its externals.

The rudder was slightly reduced in area and the symmetrical fin airfoil section changed to an asymmetrical airfoil shape, producing a sideways lift force that swung the tail slightly to the left. This helped increase the effectiveness of the rudder and reduced the need for right rudder on takeoff to counteract torque from the engine and propeller. The conspicuous bracing struts were removed from the horizontal tailplanes which were moved to slightly below and forward of their original positions. A semi-retractable tailwheel was fitted and the main undercarriage legs were raked forward by six degrees to improve the ground handling. An unexpected structural flaw of the wing and tail section was revealed when the first F-1s were rushed into service; some aircraft crashed or nearly crashed, with either the wing surface wrinkling or fracturing or by the tail structure failing. In one accident, the commander of JG 2 "Richthofen", Wilhelm Balthasar, lost his life when he was attacked by a Spitfire during a test flight. While making an evasive manoeuvre, the wings broke away and Balthasar was killed in the crash. Slightly thicker wing skins and reinforced spars dealt with the wing problems. Tests were also carried out to find out why the tails had failed and it was found that at certain engine settings a high-frequency oscillation in the tailplane spar was overlapped by harmonic vibrations from the engine; the combined effect being enough to cause structural failure at the rear fuselage–fin attachment point. Two external stiffening plates were screwed onto the outer fuselage on each side, and later the structure was reinforced.

The wing was redesigned, the most obvious change being the new quasi-elliptical wingtips, and the slight reduction of the aerodynamic area to 16.05 m^{2} (172.76 ft²). New leading edge slats, which were slightly shorter but had a slightly increased chord were fitted and new rounded, removable wingtips which changed the planview of the wings and increased the span slightly over that of the E-series. Frise-type ailerons replaced the plain ailerons of the previous models. The 2R_{1} profile was used with a thickness-to-chord ratio of 14.2 per cent at the root reducing to 11.35 per cent at the last rib. As before, dihedral was 6.53°.

The wing radiators were shallower and set farther back on the wing. A new cooling system was automatically regulated by a thermostat with connected variable position inlet and outlet flaps that would balance the lowest drag possible with the most efficient cooling. A new radiator, shallower but wider than that fitted to the E was developed. A boundary layer duct allowed continual airflow to pass through the airfoil above the radiator ducting and exit from the trailing edge of the upper split flap. The lower split flap was mechanically linked to the central "main" flap, while the upper split flap and forward bath lip position were regulated via a thermostatic valve which automatically positioned the flaps for maximum cooling effectiveness. In 1941 "cutoff" valves were introduced which allowed the pilot to shut down either wing radiator in the event of one being damaged; this allowed the remaining coolant to be preserved and the damaged aircraft returned to base. The valves were delivered to frontline units as kits, the number of which, for unknown reasons, was limited. The cutoff valves were later factory standard fitting for the Bf 109 G and K series.

=== Armament ===
The armament of the Bf 109 F was revised and consisted of the two synchronized 7.92 mm (.312 in) MG 17s with 500 rpg above the engine plus an engine gun (German: Motorkanone) firing through the propeller hub. The pilots' opinion on the new armament was mixed: Oberst Adolf Galland criticised the light armament as inadequate for the average pilot, while Major Walter Oesau preferred to fly a Bf 109 E and Oberst Werner Mölders saw the single centreline Motorkanone gun as an improvement. With the early tail unit problems out of the way, pilots generally agreed that the F series was the best-handling of all the Bf 109 series. Mölders flew one of the first operational Bf 109 F-1s over England from early October 1940; he may well have been credited with shooting down eight Hurricanes and four Spitfires while flying W.No 5628, Stammkennzeichen SG+GW between 11 and 29 October 1940.

=== F-0, F-1, F-2 ===
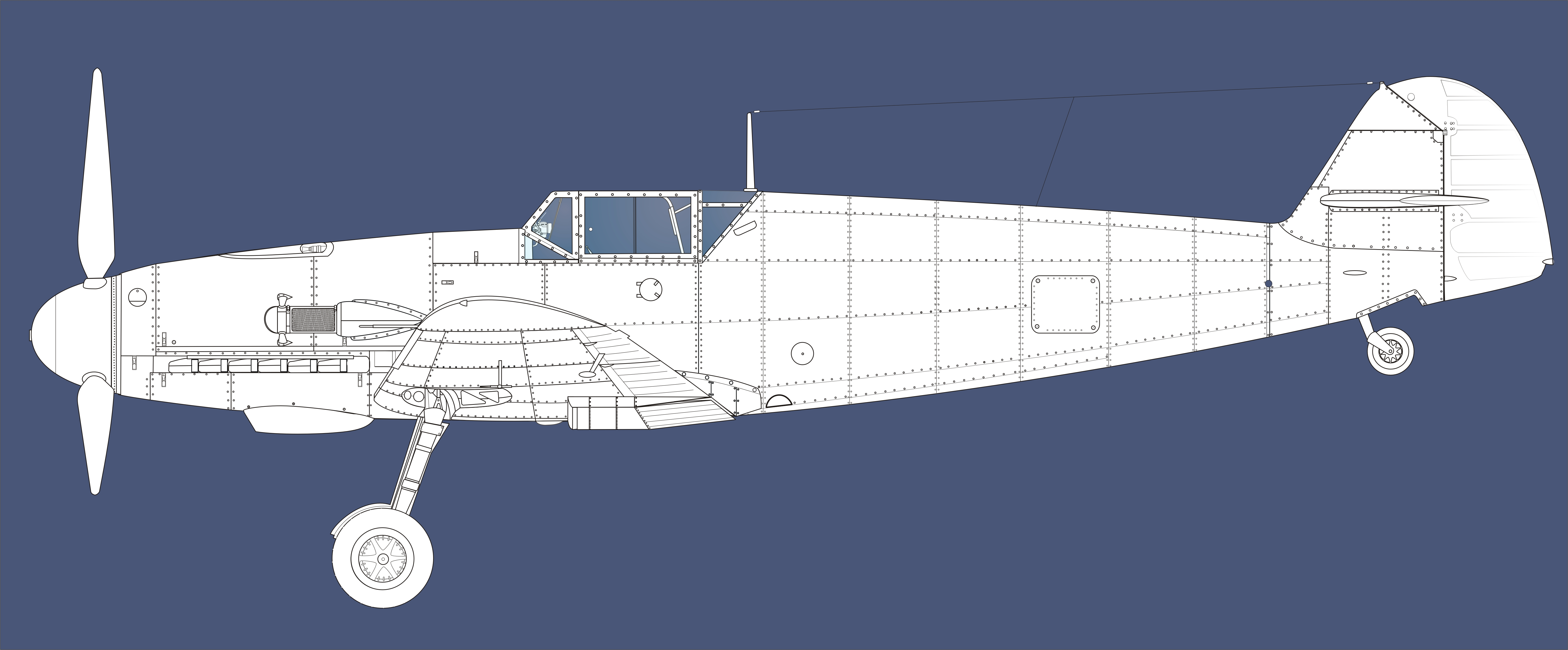
Bf 109 F-2 trop.

As the DB 601 E was not yet available in numbers, the pre-production F-0 (the only F variant to have a rectangular supercharger intake) and the first production series F-1/F-2 received the 1,175 PS (1,159 hp, 864 kW) DB 601N engine driving a VDM 9-11207 propeller. The F-0/F-1 and F-2 only differed in their armament; the F-1 being fitted with one 20 mm MG FF/M engine gun (German: Motorkanone) firing through the propeller hub, with 60 rounds. The F-1 first saw action in the Battle of Britain in October 1940 with JG 51. The most experienced fighter aces like Werner Mölders were the first ones to fly Bf 109 F-1s in combat in October 1940. A total of 208 F-1s were built between August 1940 and February 1941 by Messerschmitt Regensburg and the Wiener Neustädter Flugzeugwerke (WNF).

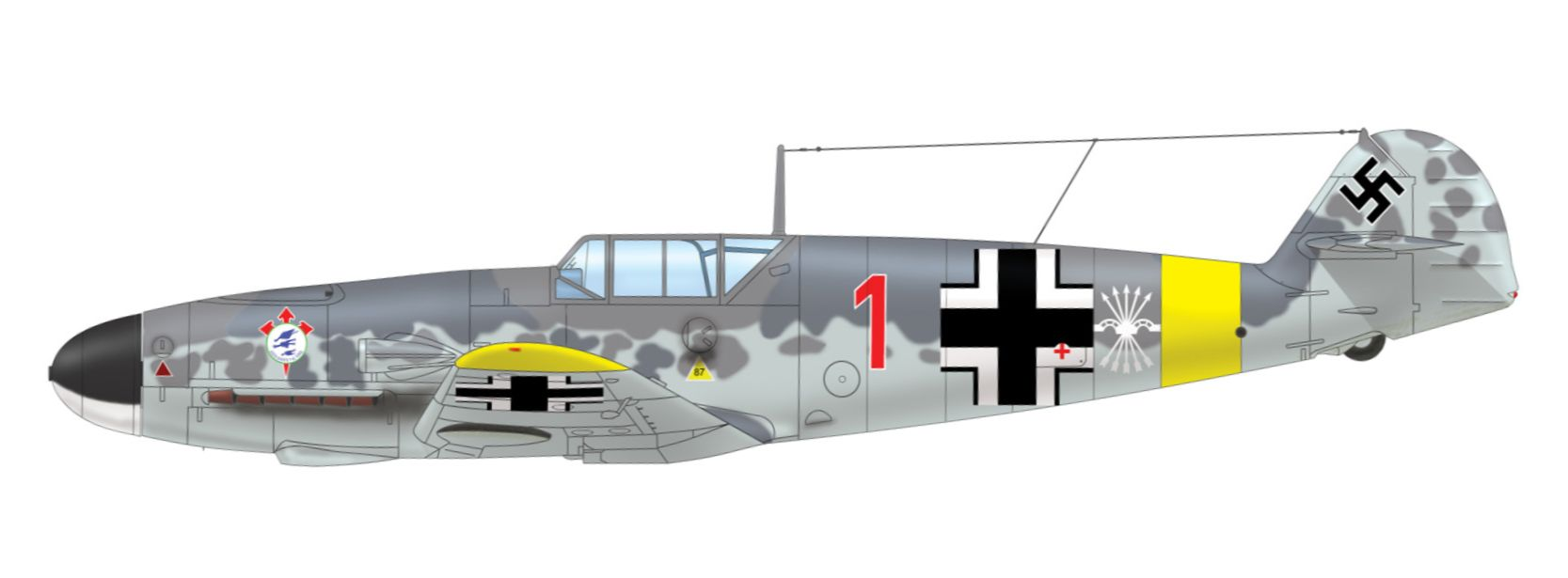
Messerschmitt Bf 109F-2 of the Escuadrilla Azul, 15.(span.)/Jagdgeschwader 51, Winter 1942–1943

The F-2 introduced the 15 mm Mauser MG 151 cannon with 200 rounds. As the harder-hitting 20 mm Mauser MG 151/20 version became available, a number of F-2s were retrofitted with it in the field. About 1,230 F-2s were built between October 1940 and August 1941 by AGO, Arado, Erla, Messerschmitt Regensburg and WNF(Wiener Neustädter Flugzeugwerke). No tropical version was built, although F-2s were fitted with sand filters in the field. The maximum speed of the F-1 and F-2 was 615 km/h (382 mph) at rated altitude.

- F-0 (Pre-production aircraft built from E series airframes, Adolf Galland was one of the few to fly one operationally)
- F-1 (Armed with 1 × 20 mm MG FF/M Motorkanone cannon and 2 × 7.92 mm/.312 in MG 17 machine guns)
- F-2 (Armed with 1 × 15 mm (.59 in) MG 151 cannon and 2 × 7.92 mm/.312 in MG 17)
  - F-2 trop (tropicalized version, only as field conversion)
  - F-2/Z (high-altitude fighter with GM-1 boost, cancelled in favour of the F-4/Z)

=== F-3, F-4, F-5, F-6 ===
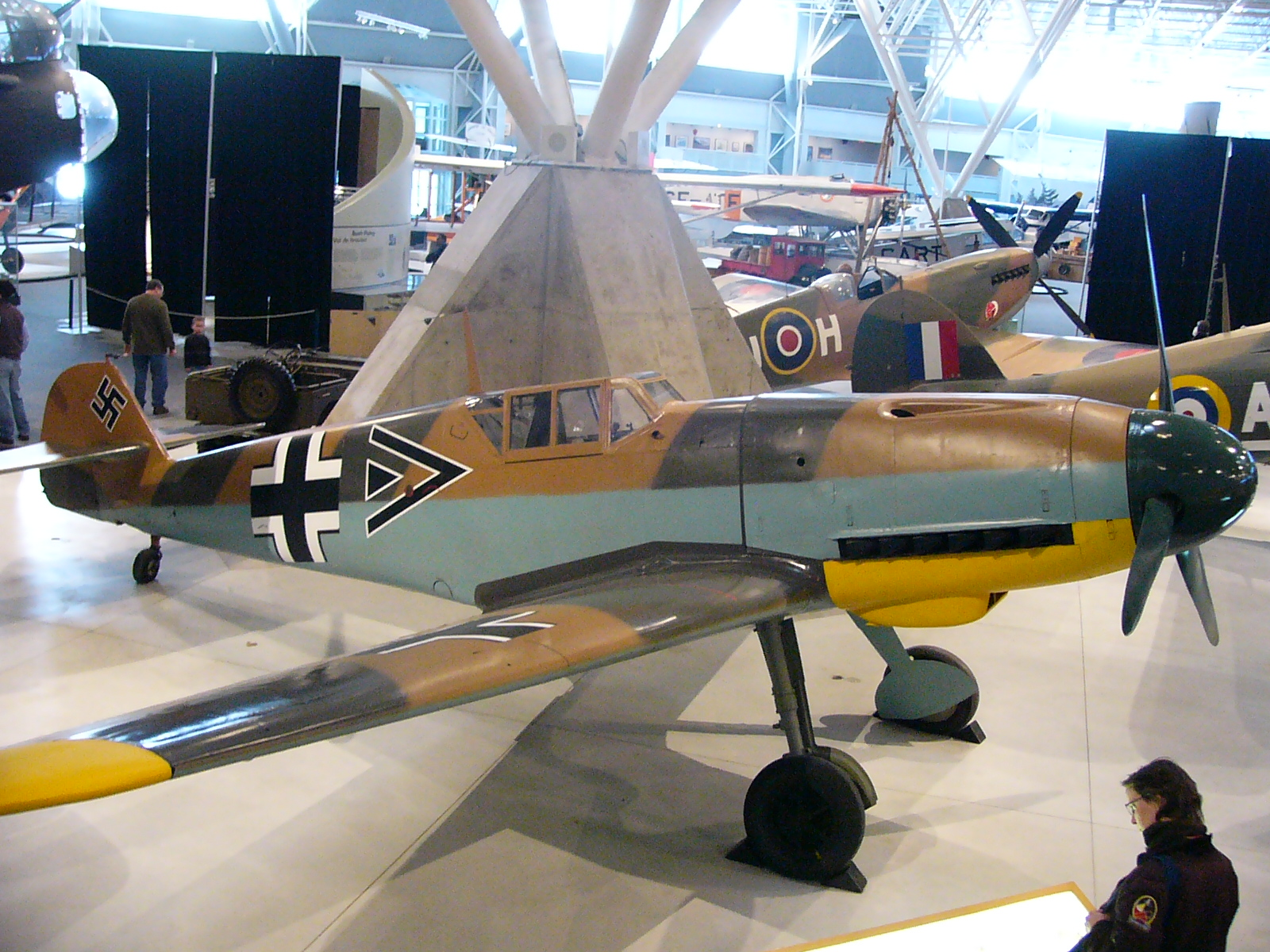
Messerschmitt Bf 109 F-4 in the Canada Aviation Museum, assigned to Horst Carganico in 1942.

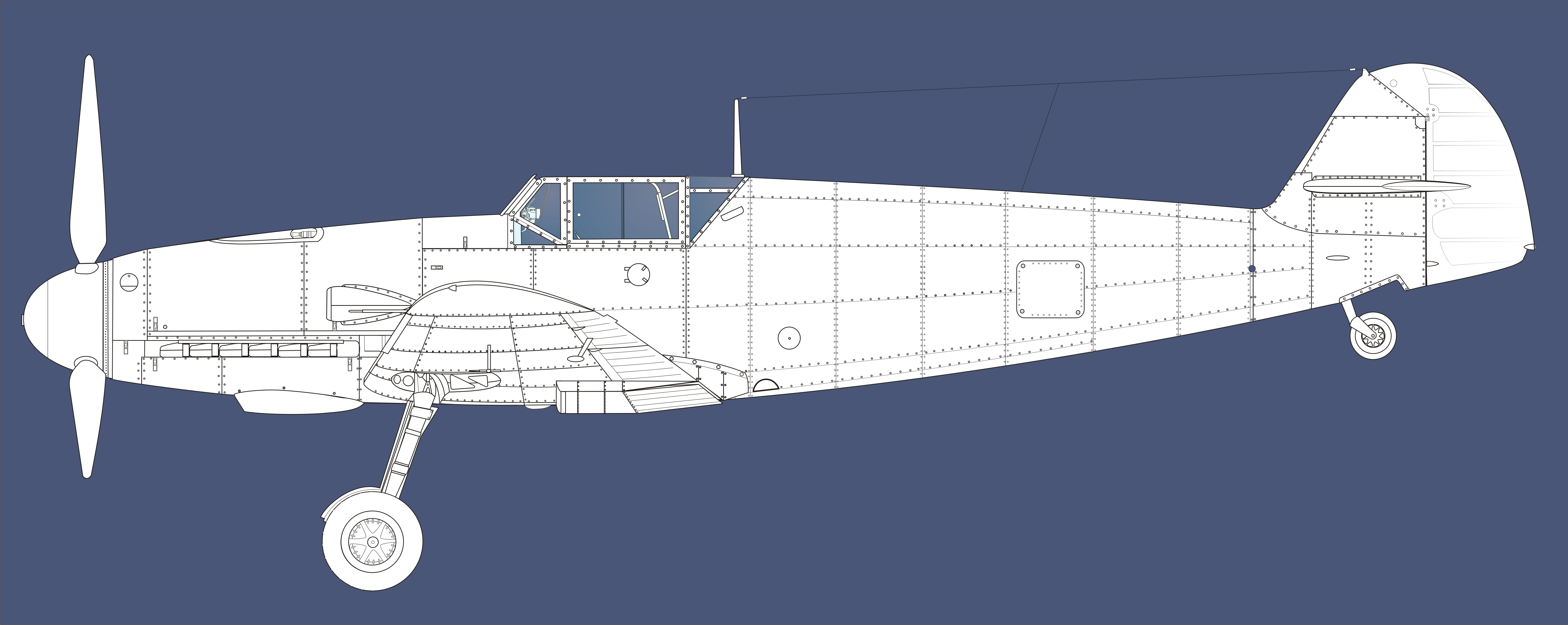
Bf 109 F-4

The 1,350 PS (1,332 hp, 993 kW) DB 601 E was used in the F-3 and F-4 model together with a VDM 9-12010 propeller with broader blades for improved altitude performance. The DB 601 E was initially restricted to 1,200 PS (1,184 hp, 883 kW) at 2,500 rpm; however, the full rating of 1,350 PS at 2,500 rpm was cleared for service use by February 1942. The DB 601 E ran on standard 87 octane "B-4" aviation fuel, despite its increased performance; while the earlier DB 601 N required 100 octane "C-3" fuel.

Only 15 examples of the F-3 are believed to have been produced by Messerschmitt Regensburg between October 1940 and January 1941. Like the F-1, the F-3 was armed with the 20 mm MG-FF/M and two 7.92 mm (.312 in) MG 17s.

From the F-4 onward, the new 20 mm Mauser MG 151/20 with 200 rounds was used as the engine gun (German: Motorkanone). The first F-4s reached frontline units in June 1941. Production lasted exactly a year between May 1941 and May 1942, with 1,841 of all F-4 variants produced. Some of the later models were capable of mounting two 20 mm MG 151/20 cannons under the wing in faired gondolas with 135 rpg. These were designated F-4/R1 and 240 of them were produced by WNF in the first quarter of 1942. This optional additional armament was standardized as field kit for later G and K series. A special high-altitude variant, the F-4/Z featuring GM-1 boost, was also built with a production run of 544 in the first quarter of 1942 and saw extensive use. Finally, the Erla factory produced 576 tropicalized F-4 trop in the first half of 1942.

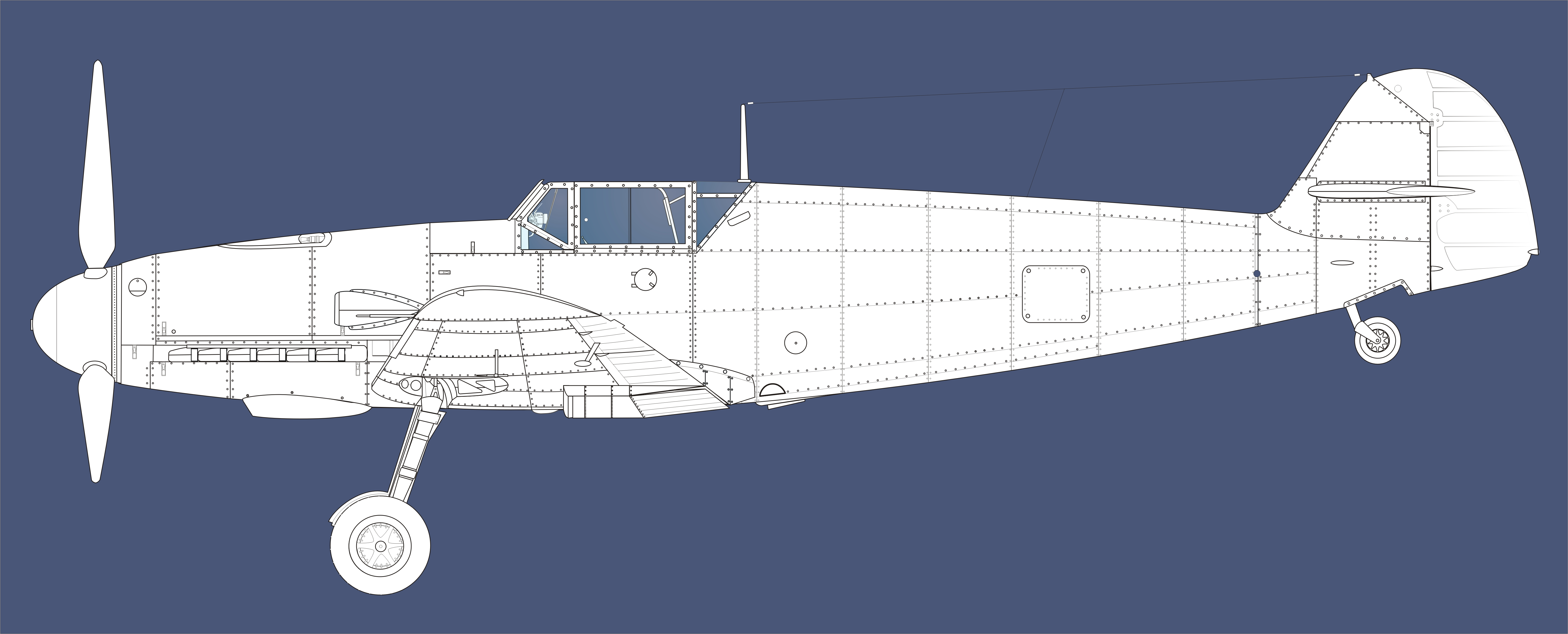
Bf 109 F-6.

With its initial engine rating of 1,200 PS, the maximum speed of the F-4 (and F-3) was 635 km/h (394 mph) at rated altitude; and with the clearance of the full rating of 1,350 PS, maximum speed increased to 659 km/h (410 mph) at 6,200 m (20,341 ft).

- F-3 (As F-1 but with 1350 PS DB 601E engine, produced in limited numbers)
- F-4 (As F-2 but with DB 601E engine, 20 mm MG 151/20 "Motorkanone" cannon replacing the 15 mm MG 151)
  - F-4/R1 (capable of mounting two 20 mm MG 151/20 cannons in underwing gondolas)
  - F-4/R2 (dedicated recon version, 5 built)
  - F-4/R3 (dedicated recon version, 36 built)
  - F-4/Z (As F-4, high-altitude fighter with GM-1 boost)
  - F-4 trop (Tropicalized fighter)
- F-5 (tactical reconnaissance variant, two MG 17 guns, no internal cameras, pilots used handheld cameras, limited numbers built)
- F-6 (reconnaissance variant, two MG 17 guns, Rb 20/30, Rb 50/30, or Rb 75/30 camera behind the cockpit, limited numbers built)
  - F-6 trop (at least one tropicalized F-6)
- F-8 (planned but not built)

== Bf 109 Gustav ==
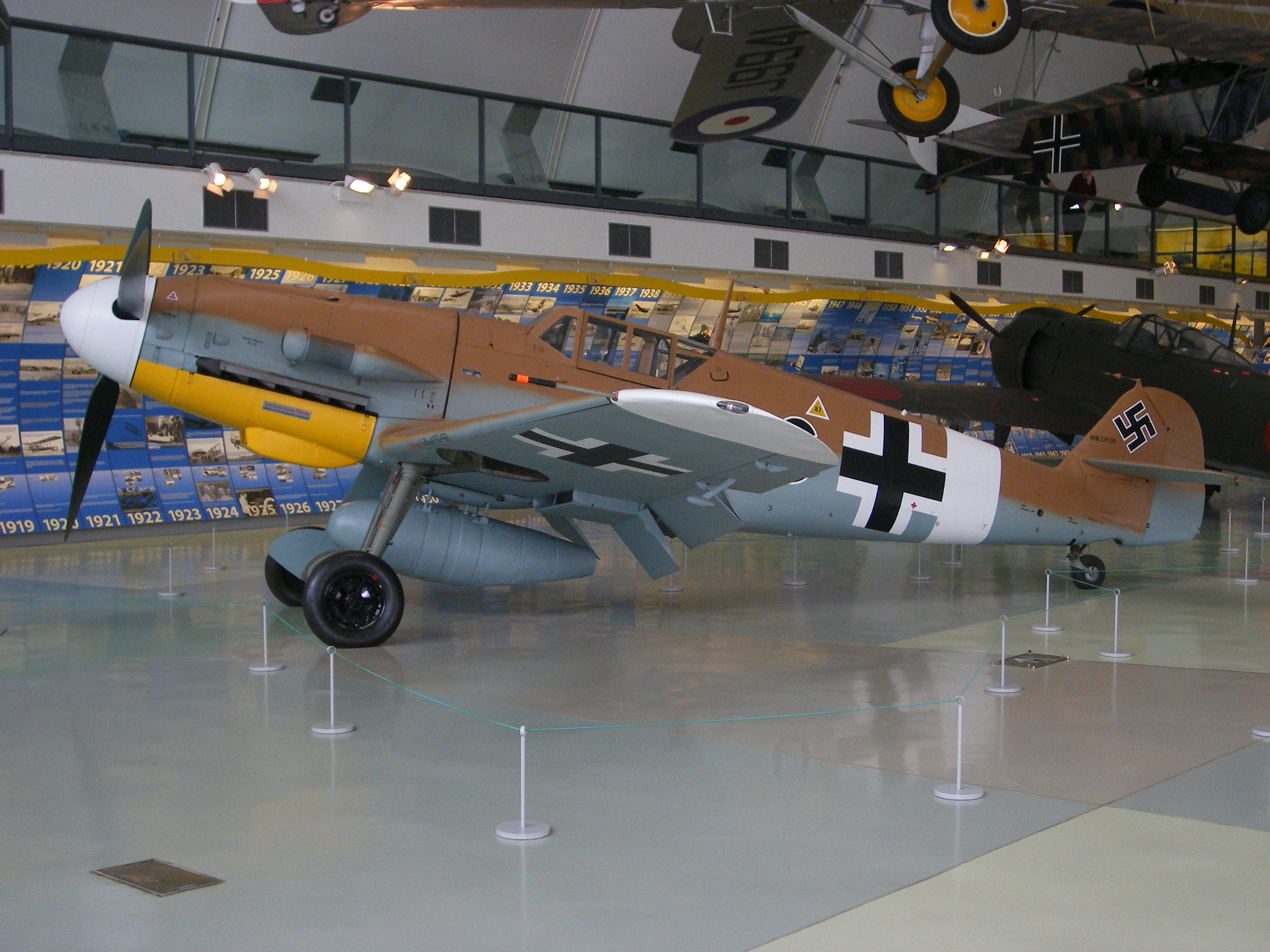
Bf 109G-2 trop "Black 6", Now on static display RAF Museum Midlands

The Bf 109 G-series was developed from the largely identical F-series airframe, although there were detail differences. Modifications included a reinforced wing structure, an internal bullet-proof windscreen, the use of heavier, welded framing for the cockpit transparencies, and additional light-alloy armour for the fuel tank. It was originally intended that the wheel wells would incorporate small doors to cover the outer portion of the wheels when retracted. To incorporate these the outer wheel bays were squared off. Two small inlet scoops for additional cooling of the spark plugs were added on both sides of the forward engine cowlings. A less obvious difference was the omission of the boundary layer bypass outlets, which had been a feature of the F-series, on the upper radiator flaps.

Like most German aircraft produced in World War II, the Bf 109 G-series was designed to adapt to different operational tasks with greater versatility; larger modifications to fulfil a specific mission task, such as long-range reconnaissance or long-range fighter-bomber, were with "Rüststand" and given a "/R" suffix, smaller modifications on the production line or during overhaul, such as equipment changes, were made with kits of pre-packaged parts known as Umrüst-Bausätze, usually contracted to Umbau and given a "/U" suffix. Field kits known as Rüstsätze were also available but those did not change the aircraft designation. Special high-altitude interceptors with GM-1 nitrous oxide injection high-altitude boost and pressurized cockpits were also produced.

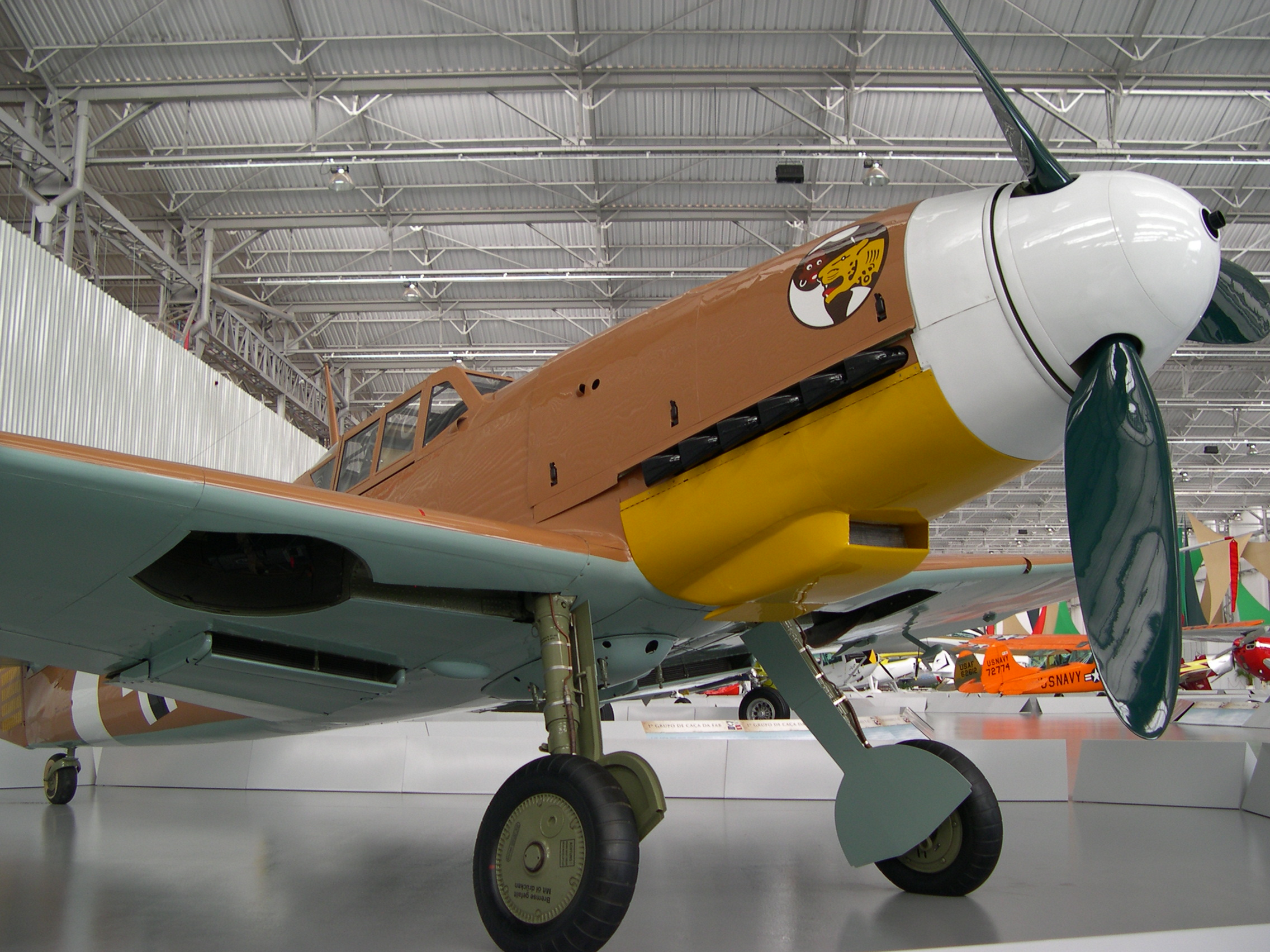
Bf 109G-2, Wings of Dream Museum in São Carlos, Brazil

The newly fitted Daimler-Benz DB 605A engine was a development of the DB 601E engine utilised by the preceding Bf 109 F-4; displacement and compression ratio were increased as well as other detail improvements to ease large-scale mass production. Takeoff and emergency power of 1,475 PS (1,455 hp, 1,085 kW) was achieved with 1.42 atm (42.5 inches/6.17 lbs) of boost at 2,800 rpm. The DB 605 suffered from reliability problems during the first year of operation, and this output was initially banned by VT-Anw.Nr.2206, forcing Luftwaffe units to limit maximum power output to 1,310 PS (1,292 hp, 964 kW) at 2,600 rpm and 1.3 atm manifold pressure (38.9 inches/4.4 lbs). The full output was not reinstated until 8 June 1943 when Daimler-Benz issued a technical directive. Up to 1944, the G-series was powered by the 1,475 PS Daimler-Benz DB 605 driving a three-blade VDM 9-12087A variable-pitch propeller with a diameter of 3 m (9.8 ft) with even broader blades than used on the F-series. Pitch control, as on the 109F, was either electro-mechanical (automatic) or manual-electric using a thumb-switch on the throttle lever. From 1944 a new high-altitude propeller with broader blades was introduced, designated VDM 9-12159, and was fitted to high-altitude variants with the DB 605AS or D-series engines.

The early versions of the Bf 109G closely resembled the Bf 109 F-4 and carried the same basic armament; however, as the basic airframe was modified to keep pace with different operational requirements, the basically clean design began to change. From the spring of 1943, the G-series saw the appearance of bulges in the cowling when the 7.92 mm (.312 in) MG 17 were replaced with 13 mm (.51 in) MG 131 machine guns (G-5 onwards) due to the latter's much larger breechblock, and on the wings (due to larger tyres), leading to the Bf 109 G-6's nickname "Die Beule" ("The Bulge"). The Bf 109G continued to be improved: new clear-view cockpits, greater firepower in the form of the 30 mm (1.18 in) MK 108 cannon were introduced in late 1943; and a new, enlarged supercharger in the high-altitude DB 605AS engine, a larger vertical stabilizer (G-5 onwards), and MW 50 power boost in 1944.

Erich Hartmann, the world's top scoring fighter ace, claiming 352 victories, flew only the Bf 109G, of which he said:

It was very manoeuvrable, and it was easy to handle. It speeded up very fast, if you dived a little. And in the acrobatics manoeuver, you could spin with the 109, and go very easy out of the spin. The only problems occurred during takeoff. It had a strong engine, and a small, narrow-tread undercarriage. If you took off too fast it would turn [roll] ninety degrees away. We lost a lot of pilots in takeoffs.

From the Bf 109 G-5 on an enlarged wooden tail unit (identifiable by a taller vertical stabilizer and rudder with a morticed balance tab, rather than the angled shape) was often fitted. This tail unit was standardised on G-10s and K-4s. Although the enlarged tail unit improved handling, especially on the ground, it weighed more than the standard metal tail unit and required that a counterweight was fitted in the nose, increasing the variant's overall weight.

With the Bf 109G, a number of special versions were introduced to cope with special mission profiles. Here, long-range fighter-reconnaissance and high-altitude interceptors can be mentioned. The former were capable of carrying two 300 L (80 US gal) drop tanks, one under each wing; and the latter received pressurized cockpits for pilot comfort and GM-1 nitrous oxide "boost" for high altitudes. The latter system, when engaged, was capable of increasing engine output by 223 kW (300 hp) above the rated altitude to increase high-altitude performance.

=== Add-on kits ===
The base subtypes could be equipped with Rüstsatz add-on standard field kits; in practice this meant hanging on some sort of additional equipment like droptanks, bombs or cannons to standard attachment points, present on all production aircraft. Aircraft could be modified in the factory with Umrüst-bausatz (Umbau) conversion kits or by adding extra equipment, called Rüstzustand, to convert standard airframes for special roles, a reconnaissance or bad-weather fighter, for example. Unlike the Rüstsatz field-kits, these modifications were permanent.

The Rüstsatz kits were labelled with the letter "R" and a Roman numeral. Rüstsatz kits did not alter the aircraft type so a Bf 109 G-6 with Rüstsatz II (50 kg/110 lb bombs) remained a Bf 109 G-6 and not G-6/R2, which was a reconnaissance fighter with MW 50, as suggested by most publications. The Umrüst-Bausatz, Umbau or Rüstzustand were identified with either an "/R" or "/U" suffix and an Arabic number, e.g. Bf 109 G-10/U4.

Common Rüstsatz kits: Bf 109G:

- R I (ETC 501/IX b bomb rack under the fuselage, fusing equipment for an SC 250 or SD 250 type 250 kg (550 lb) bomb)
- R II (ETC 50/VIII d bomb rack under the fuselage, fusing equipment, for four SC 50 type 50 kg (110 lb) bombs)
- R III (Schloß 503A-1 rack for one fuselage drop tank (300 L/80 US gal))
- R IV (two 30 mm (1.18 in) Rheinmetall-Borsig MK 108 underwing gunpods)
- R VI (two 20 mm Mauser MG 151/20 underwing gunpods with 135 rpg)
- R VII (Peilrufanlage)

Common Umrüst-Bausatz (Umbau) numbers:

- U1 (Messerschmitt P6 reversible-pitch propeller to be used as air brake, only prototypes)
- U2 (GM-1 boost, during 1944 several hundred converted to MW-50 boost)
- U3 (Reconnaissance conversion, in autumn 1943 G-6/U3 adopted as G-8 production variant)
- U4 (30 mm (1.18 in) MK 108 Motorkanone-engine gun)

=== G-0, G-1, G-2 ===
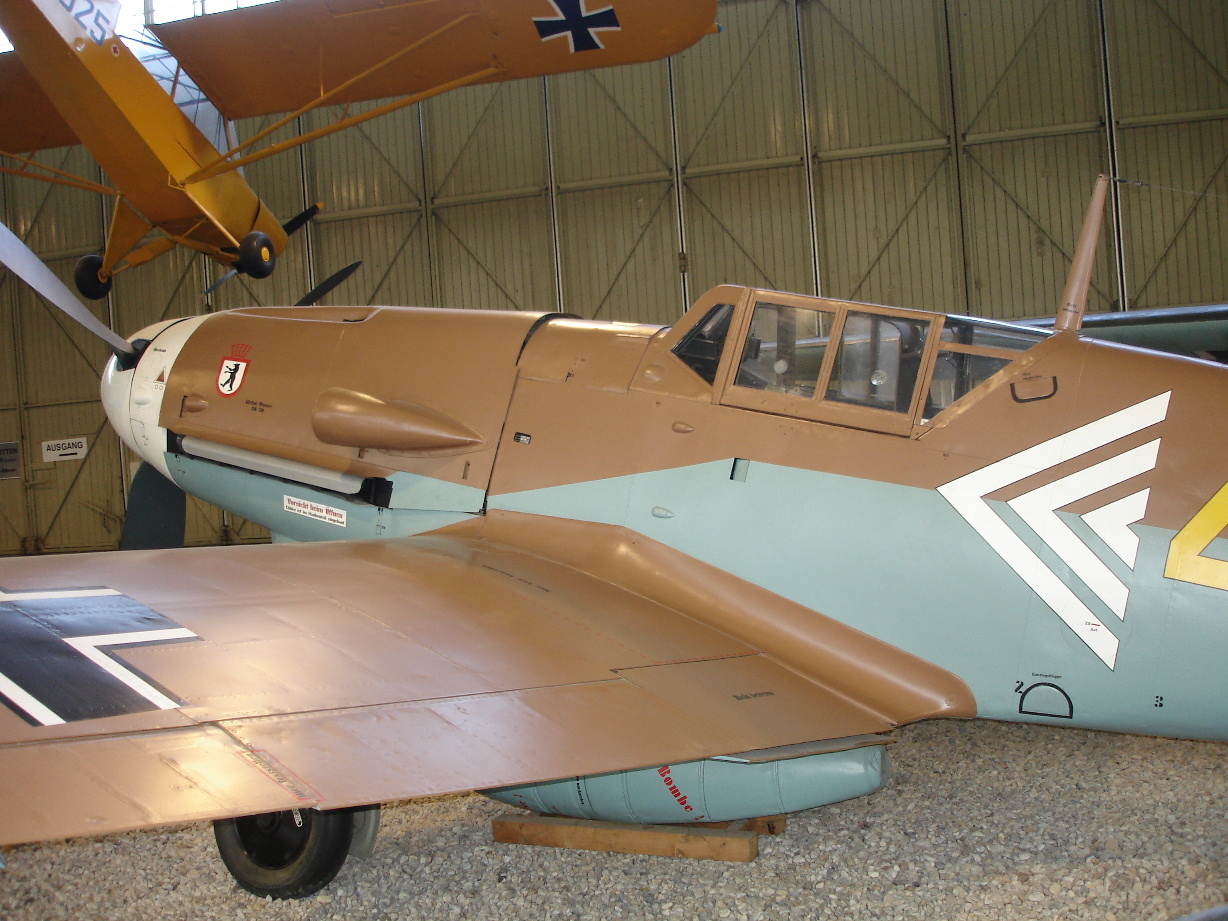
Gustav Rödel Bf 109 G-2 remake in the Luftwaffenmuseum in Berlin

The Gustav-series was initiated by a small pre-production series, G-0, powered by a DB 601E engine. The first production variant, G-1, produced from February 1942, was the first production Bf 109 with a pressurized cockpit, and featured the DB 605 engine. It could be identified by the small, horn-shaped air intake for the cockpit compressor just above the supercharger intake, on the left upper cowling. In addition, the angled armour plate for the pilot's head was replaced by a vertical piece which sealed-off the rear of the side-hinged cockpit canopy. Small, triangular armour-glass panels were fitted into the upper corners of this armour, although there were aircraft in which the plate was solid steel. Silica gel capsules were placed in each pane of the windscreen and opening canopy to absorb any moisture which may have been trapped in the double glazing. The last 80 G-1s built were lightweight G-1/R2. In these GM-1 nitrous oxide 'boost' was used, and the pilot's back armour was removed, as were all fittings for the long-range drop tank. A few G-1 flown by I./JG 1 are known to have carried the underwing 20 mm MG 151/20 cannon gondolas.

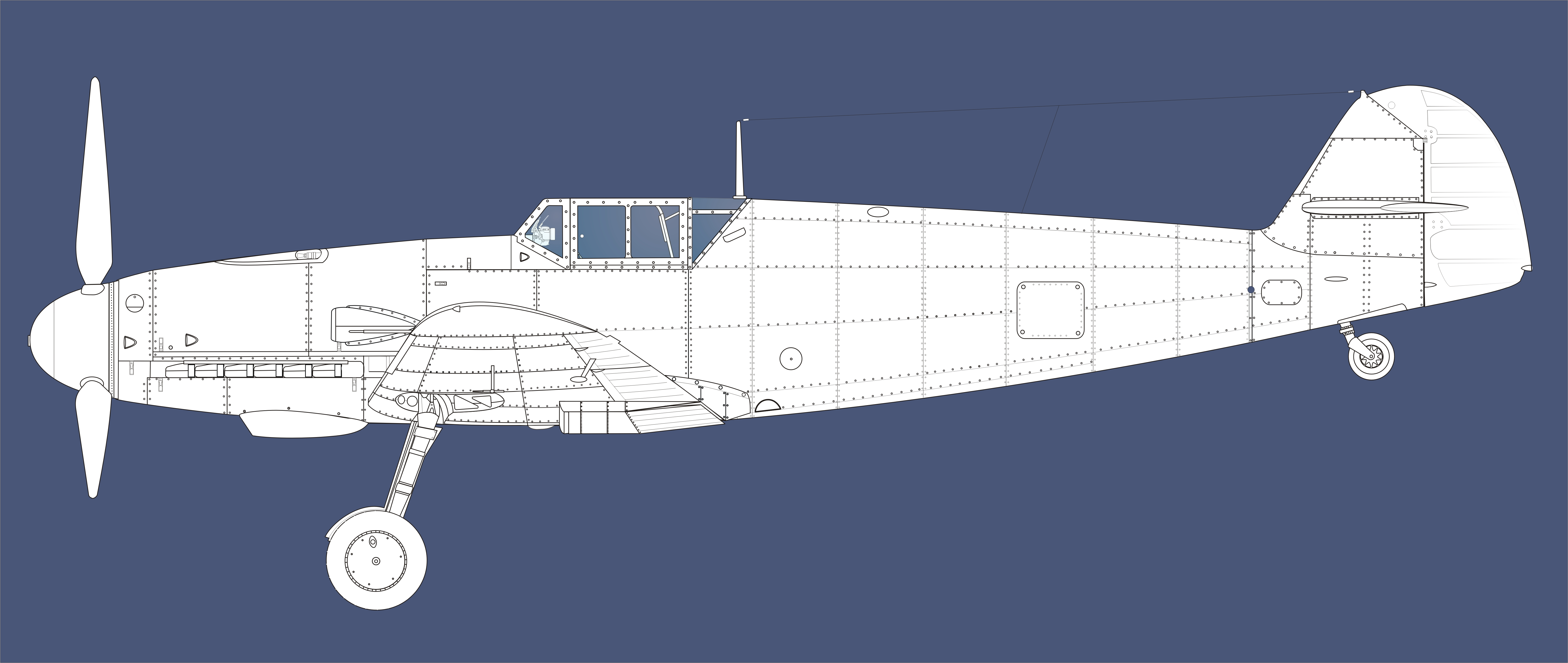
Bf 109 G-2.

The G-2, which started production in May 1942, lacked the cabin pressurization and GM-1 installation. Performance-wise it was identical to the G-1. The canopy reverted to one layer of glazing and incorporated the angled head armour used on the F-4, although several G-2 had the vertical type as fitted to the G-1. Several Rüstsätze could be fitted, although installing these did not change the designation of the aircraft. Instead the "/R" suffix referred to the G-2's Rüstzustand or equipment condition of the airframe, which was assigned at the factory rather than in the field. There were two Rüstzustand planned for G-2s:

- G-2/R1: Long-range fighter-bomber. It carried a bomb up to 500 kg (1,100 lb) under the fuselage and had a modified fuel system with underwing fittings for a 300 L (80 US gal) drop tank. As a standard Bf 109G had not enough ground clearance to carry a 500 kg bomb, a jettisonable auxiliary undercarriage was added just aft of the cockpit. The prototype was the FiSk 199. No production known
- G-2/R2: a reconnaissance aircraft with GM-1 and camera equipment.

The rack and internal fuel lines for carrying a 300 L (80 US gal) under-fuselage drop-tank were widely used on G-2s, as were the underwing 20 mm MG 151/20 cannon gondolas. Several G-2s were fitted with the ETC 500 bomb rack, capable of carrying one 250 kg (550 lb) bomb. The final G-2 production batches built by Erla and Messerschmitt Regensburg were equipped as tropical aircraft (often referred to as G-2 trop), equipped with a sand-filter on the front of the supercharger intake and two small, teardrop-shaped metal brackets on the left side of the fuselage, below the cockpit sill. These were used as mounts for specially designed sun umbrellas (called Sonderwerkzeug or Special tool), which were used to shade the cockpit.

A total of 167 G-1s were built between February and June 1942, 1,586 G-2s between May 1942 and February 1943, and one further G-2 was built in Győr, Hungary, in 1943. Maximum speed of the G-2 was 537 km/h (334 mph) at sea level and 660 km/h (410 mph) at 7,000 m (22,970 ft) rated altitude with the initial reduced 1.3 atm rating. Performance of the G-1 was similar, but above rated altitude the GM-1 system it was equipped with could be used to provide an additional 350 horsepower. With his G-1/R2, pilot R. Klein achieved 660 km/h (420 mph) at 12,000 m (39,370 ft), and a ceiling of 13,800 m (45,275 ft).

The following variants of the G-1 and G-2 were produced:

- G-0 (Pre-production aircraft, powered by a DB 601E engine)
- G-1 (Pressurized fighter, powered by a DB 605A engine)
  - G-1/R2 (Reconnaissance fighter)
  - G-1/U2 (High-altitude fighter with GM-1)
- G-2 (Light fighter)
  - G-2/R1 (Long-range Fighter-bomber or JaboRei, with 2 × 300 L/80 US gal underwing drop tanks, 500 kg/1,100 lb bomb under fuselage, extended second tail wheel, only prototype)
  - G-2/R2 (Reconnaissance fighter)
  - G-2 trop (Tropicalized fighter)

=== G-3, G-4 ===
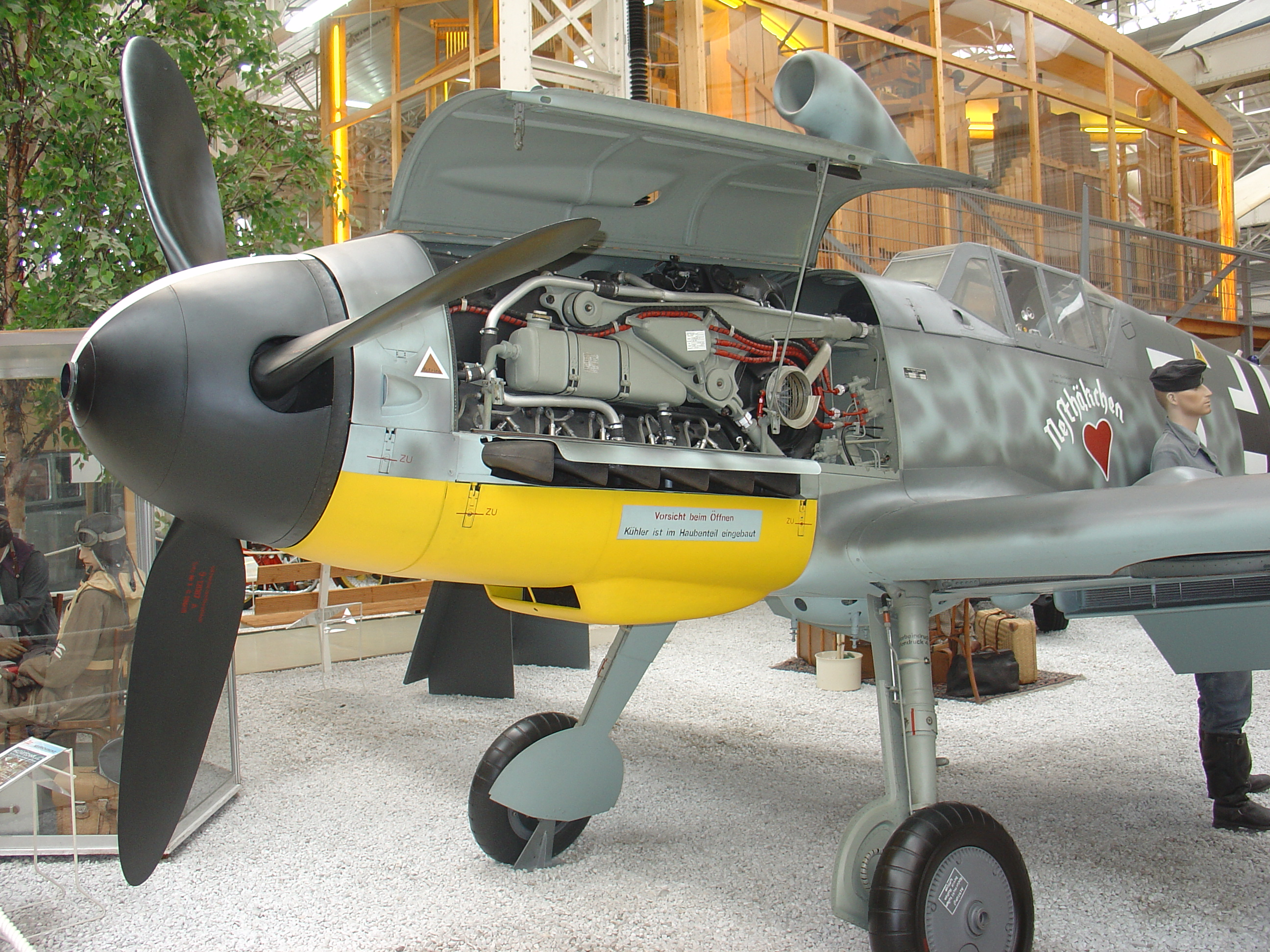
Bf 109 G-4 W.Nr. 19310 on display at Technikmuseum Speyer

In September 1942, the G-4 appeared; this version was identical to the G-2 in all aspects, including performance, except for being fitted with the FuG 16 VHF radio set, which provided much clearer radio transmissions and had three times the range of the earlier HF sets. Externally this could be recognised by the position of the fuselage antenna lead-in which was moved further aft to between frames seven and eight on the fuselage spine. Due to the steady weight increases of the 109, from the spring of 1943 larger 660 × 160 mm (26 × 6.3 in) mainwheels were introduced, replacing the previously used 650 × 150 mm (25.6 × 6 in) type. The undercarriage legs were altered so that the wheel's vertical axis was nearly upright rather than being parallel with the oleo leg.

These changes resulted in the fitting of teardrop-shaped fairings to the upper wing surface above the wheel-wells to accommodate the upper part of the mainwheels. The larger wheels and fairings were often retrofitted to G-2s. (Note: The last production G-2s were fitted with the enlarged mainwheels and tailwheel while the first of the G-4s used the smaller wheels.) In addition, a larger 350 × 135 mm (14 × 5 in) tailwheel replaced the original 290 × 110 mm (11 × 4 in) one; the larger tailwheel no longer fitted the recess, so the retraction mechanism was disconnected and the tailwheel fixed down. Up to July 1943, 1,242 G-4s were produced, with an additional four in Győr and WNF factories in the second half of 1943. Between January and February 1943, 50 examples of a pressurized version, the G-3 were also produced; similar to the G-1 although it was equipped with the same FuG 16 VHF radio set as the G-4.

The following variants of the G-3 and G-4 were produced:

- G-3 (Pressurized fighter, as G-1 with FuG 16 VHF radio; 50 built)
- G-4 (Fighter)
  - G-4/R2 (Reconnaissance fighter)
  - G-4/R3 (Long-range reconnaissance fighter, with 2 × 300 L/80 US gal underwing droptanks)
  - G-4 trop (Tropicalized fighter)
  - G-4/U3 (Reconnaissance fighter)
  - G-4y (Command fighter)

=== G-5, G-6 ===
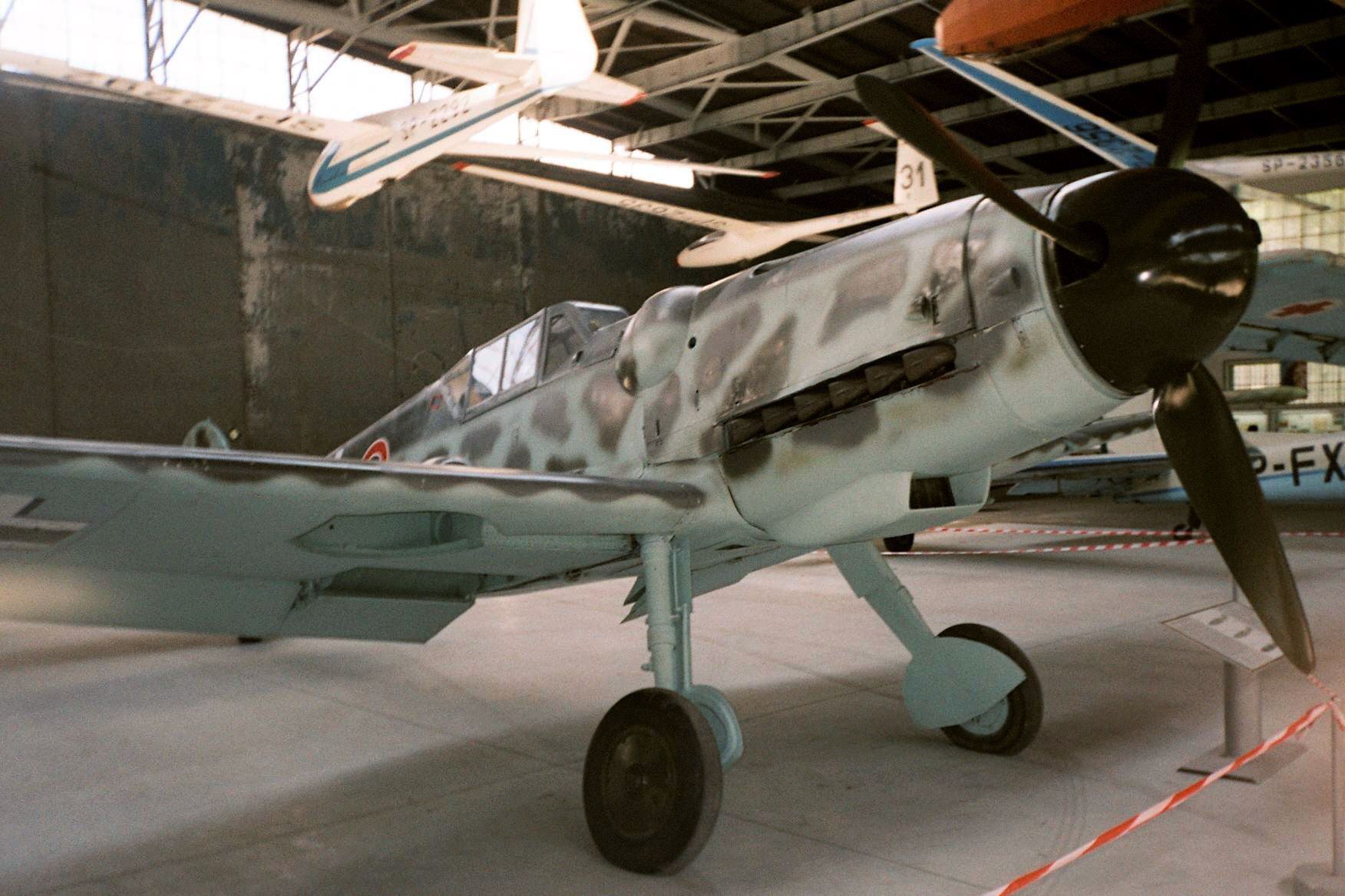
Bf 109G-6 on display in the Polish Aviation Museum in Kraków

In February 1943, the G-6 was introduced with the 13 mm (.51 in) MG 131s, replacing the smaller 7.92 mm (.312 in) MG 17 – externally this resulted in two sizeable Beule blisters over the gun breeches, reducing speed by 9 km/h (6 mph). Over 12,000 examples were built well into 1944 although contradictory factory and RLM records do not allow an exact tally. The G-5 with a pressurized cockpit was identical to the G-6. A total of 475 examples were built between May 1943 and August 1944. The G-5/AS was equipped with a DB 605AS engine for high-altitude missions. GM-1-boosted G-5 and G-6 variants received the additional designation of "/U2". and were clearly identifiable as they use a modified, aerodynamically cleaner, engine cowl without the usual blisters. The G-6/U4 variant was armed with a 30 mm (1.18 in) MK 108 cannon mounted as an engine gun (German: Motorkanone) firing through the propeller hub instead of the 20 mm MG 151/20. The G-6 was very often seen during 1943 fitted with assembly sets, used to carry bombs or a drop tank, for use as a night fighter, or to increase firepower by adding rockets or extra gondola-style, underwing gun pod mount ordnance.

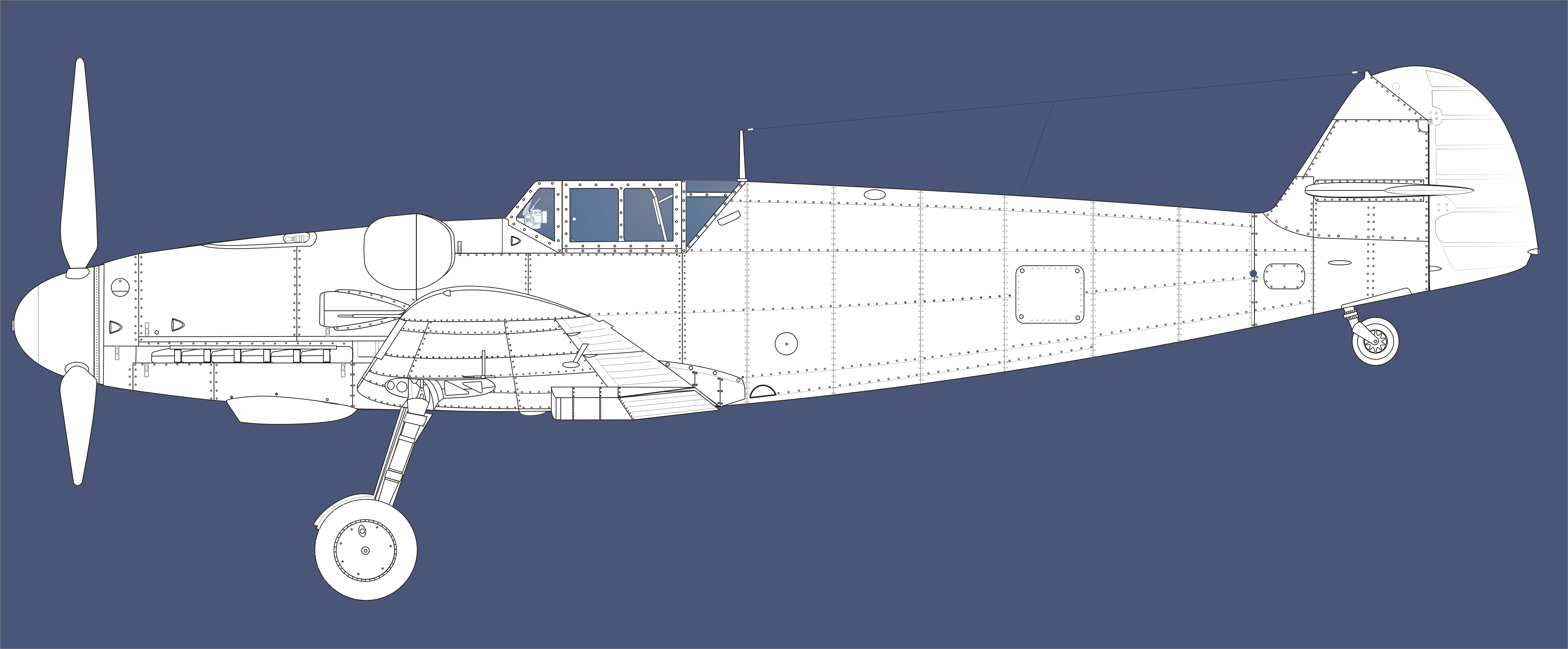
Bf 109 G-6

The following variants of the G-5 and G-6 were produced:

- G-5 (Pressurized fighter)
  - G-5/U2 (High-altitude fighter with GM-1 boost)
  - G-5/U2/R2 (High-altitude reconnaissance fighter with GM-1 boost)
  - G-5/AS (High-altitude fighter with DB 605AS engine)
  - G-5y (Command fighter)
- G-6 (Light fighter)
  - G-6/R2 (Reconnaissance fighter, with MW 50)
  - G-6/R3 (Long-range reconnaissance fighter, with 2 × 300 L/80 US gal underwing droptanks)
  - G-6 trop (Tropicalized fighter)
  - G-6/U2 (Fitted with GM-1)
  - G-6/U3 (Reconnaissance fighter)
  - G-6/U4 (As G-6 but with 30 mm/1.18 in MK 108 Motorkanone engine cannon)
  - G-6y (Command fighter)
  - G-6/AS (High-altitude fighter with DB 605AS engine)
  - G-6/ASy (High-altitude command fighter)
  - G-6N (Night fighter, usually with Rüstsatz VI (two underwing MG 151/20 cannons) and sometimes with FuG 350Z Naxos)
  - G-6/U4 N (as G-6N but with 30 mm/1.18 in MK 108 Motorkanone engine cannon)

One offensive weapons upgrade in 1943 for the Bf 109G – and also used for the Fw 190A – was one that mounted the Werfer-Granate 21 heavy calibre rocket weapon system with one launching tube under each wing panel. The rockets, fitted with a massive 40.8 kg (90 lbs) warhead, were aimed via the standard Revi reflector sights, and were spin-stabilized in flight. In emergency, the tubes could be jettisoned via a small explosive charge. Intended as a "stand-off" weapon, fired from a distance of 1,200 meters and outside the effective range of the formations defensive guns, it was employed against Allied bomber formations, the Wfr. Gr. 21 rocket was unofficially known as the BR 21 (Bordrakete 21 cm) for the Bf 109G-5, G-6 and G-14. The weapons system received the designation of Rüstsatz VII on the G-10.

=== G-10 ===
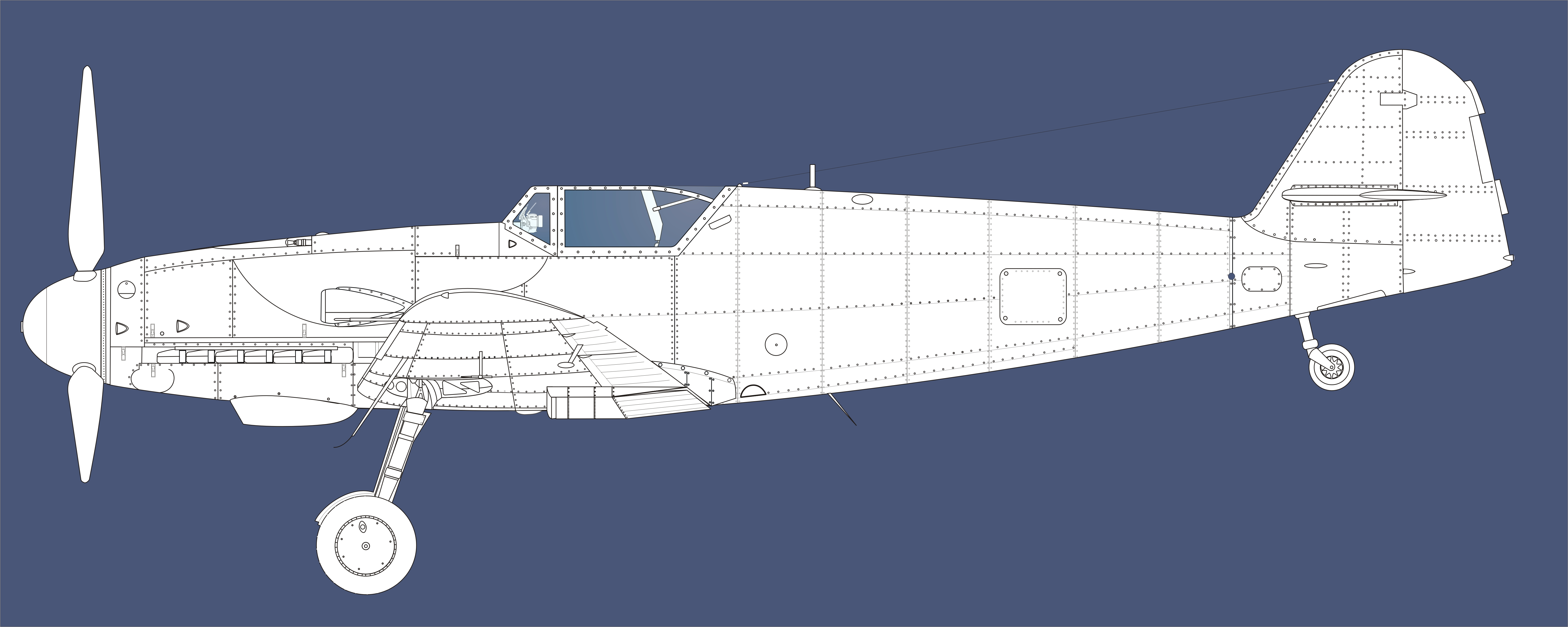
Bf 109 G-10 - note swept-forward radio antenna mast, under port wing's leading edge.

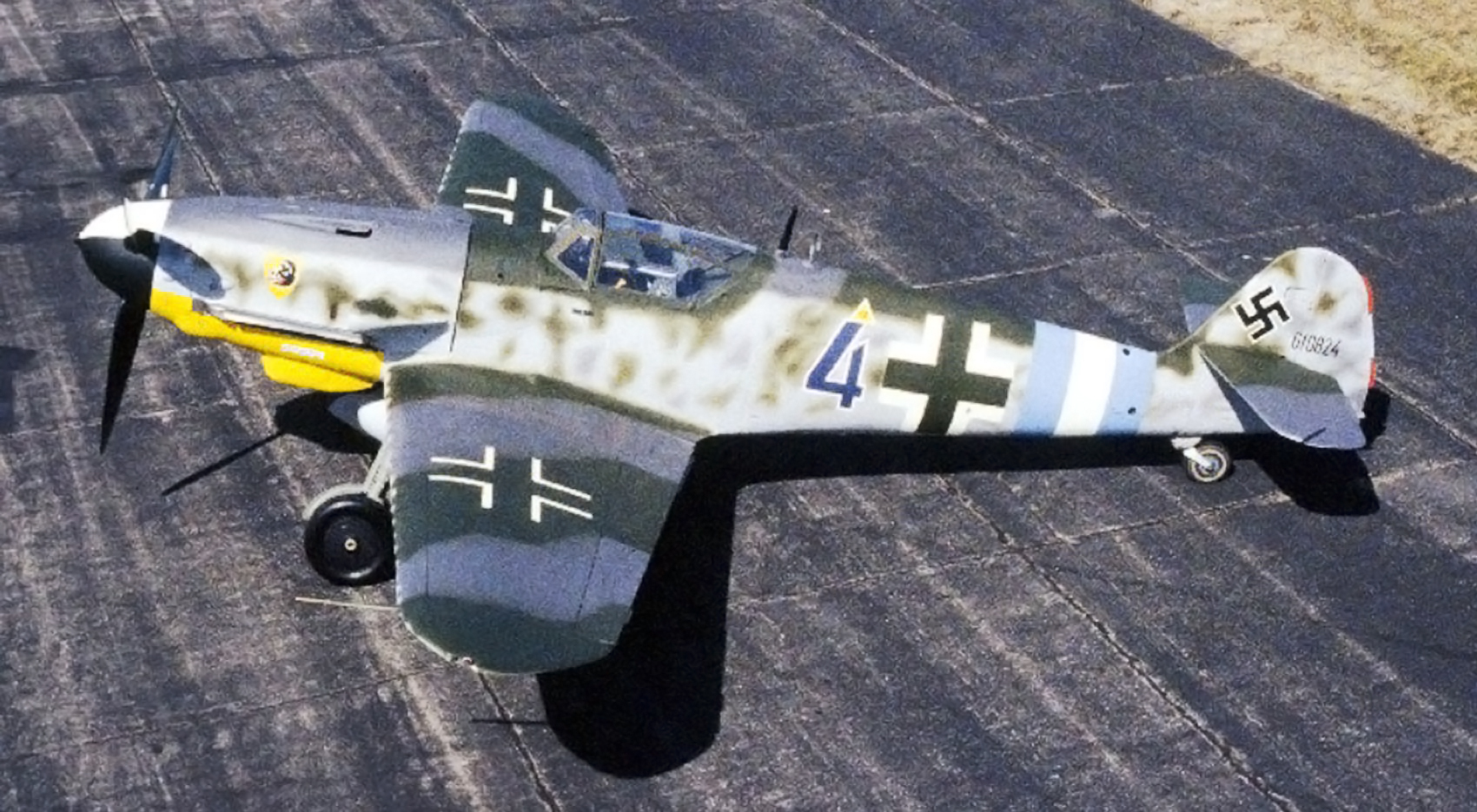
Messerschmitt Bf 109G-10 at the National Museum of the United States Air Force in Dayton, Ohio

Referred to as the "bastard aircraft of the Erla factory" in the Luftwaffe's Aircraft Variants Book of December 1944, the G-10 was a Bf 109 G airframe combined with the new DB 605 D-2 engine, (Note: The DB 605D was a one-off prototype engine developed from the DB 605A using internal modifications to raise its altitude rating. The DB 605 D-2 was a development of this using the larger DB 603 supercharger. When fitted with the MW-50 water/methanol injection system this became the DB 605DM.) created to maintain production levels with minimal disruption of the assembly lines until production of K-series airframes would reach sufficient levels. Despite what the designation would suggest, it appeared in service after the G-14 in November 1944, largely replacing previous G-series aircraft on the production lines of Erla, WNF and Messerschmitt Regensburg factories. Contrary to popular belief the G-10 were not rebuilt older airframes but new production. Early production G-10 may have had two data plates (one stamped G-14) as these airframes were originally intended for G-14 assembly but were diverted to G-10 assembly.

The most recognizable external change was the use of the three-panel Erla-Haube clear-view canopy, which filled the entire canopy length behind the four-panel windscreen unit, which eliminated the older, rear fixed canopy section. Internal changes included inheriting the new 2,000 W generator and the DB 605 D-2 engine of the 109K. Apart from the standardised streamlined engine cowlings, G-10s with the DB605 D-2 were equipped as standard with the MW-50 booster system (DB 605DM, later 605DB) and had a larger Fo 987 oil cooler housed in a deeper fairing. Also, because of the engine's enlarged crankcase and the oil return lines which ran in front of it, these G-10s had small blister fairings incorporated into the lower engine cowlings, forward of and below the exhaust stacks, except for Erla-built aircraft, which had modified cowlings without the little bulges in front of the exhaust stacks. This became a distinguishing feature between Erla-built G-10s and those of other factories. The radio antenna mast was also removed from atop the rear fuselage turtledeck, and replaced with a standard late-war Luftwaffe ventral whip aerial antenna under the wing.

The following variants of the G-10 were produced:

- G-10 (Light fighter with DB605DM or DB/DC engine)
  - G-10/R2 (Reconnaissance fighter)
  - G-10/R6 (Bad-weather fighter with PKS 12 autopilot)
  - G-10/U4 (As G-10 but with 30 mm/1.18 in MK 108 Motorkanone-engine gun) This variant was only produced by the Wiener Neustadt Werke, and used only on the Eastern front in 1945.

Approximately 2,600 G-10s were produced from October 1944 until the war's end.

=== G-8 ===
The G-8 was a dedicated reconnaissance version based on the G-6. The G-8 often had only the engine gun or the cowling machine guns installed, and there were several subversions for short- or long-range reconnaissance missions with a wide variety of cameras and radios available for use.

=== G-12 ===
The Bf 109 G-12 was a two-seat trainer version of the Bf 109. This was a conversion of "war-weary" or rebuilt G-4 and G-6 airframes; the space needed for the second cockpit was gained by reducing the internal fuel capacity to only 240 L (60 US gal) meaning that the 300 L (80 US gal) drop tank was employed as standard equipment. This version was rarely armed with anything more than one or two cowling machine guns. The rear cockpit canopy was bowed out to give the instructor, who sat behind the student pilot in an armoured seat, a clearer view. The rear cockpit was also equipped with a basic instrument panel and all flight controls.

=== G-14 ===
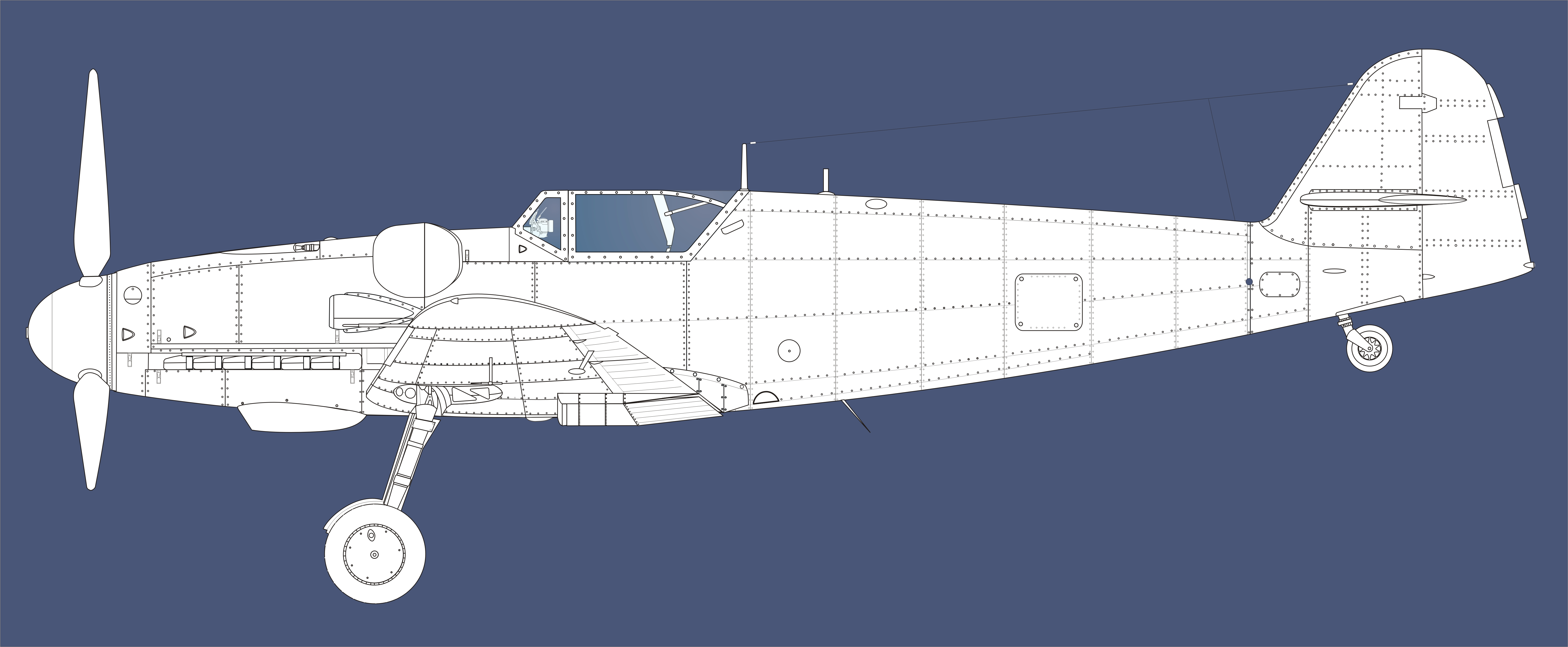
Bf 109 G-14.

The G-14 arrived in July 1944 at the invasion front over France. It represented an attempt to create a standard type, incorporating many changes which had been introduced during production of the G-6, and which led to a plethora of variants, plaguing decentralized mass production. The standardization attempt proved to be a failure, but overall the type offered improved combat performance, as MW 50 power boosting water injection (increasing output to 1,800 PS (1,775 hp, 1,324 kW), the clear-view Erla Haube was now standard installation. Top speed was 573 km/h (353 mph) at sea level, and 665 km/h (413 mph) at 5 km (16,400 ft) altitude. A high-altitude fighter, designated G-14/AS was also produced with the DB 605ASM high-altitude engine. The ASM engine was built with a larger capacity supercharger, and had a higher rated altitude, and correspondingly the top speed of the G-14/AS was 590 km/h (348 mph) at sea level, and 680 km/h (422 mph) at 7.5 km (24,600 ft) altitude.

There was increasing tendency to use plywood on some less vital parts e.g. on a taller fin/rudder unit, pilot seat or instrument panel. A cautious estimate based on the available records suggest that about 5,500 G-14s and G-14/AS were built.

The following variants of the G-14 were produced:

- G-14 (Fighter; standardized late-production G-6; DB 605AM engine, MW 50 boost)
  - G-14/AS (High-altitude fighter with DB 605ASM engine, MW 50 boost)
  - G-14/ASy (High-altitude command fighter)
  - G-14y (command fighter)
  - G-14/U4 (As G-14, but with 30 mm/1.18 in MK 108 Motorkanone-engine gun)

=== Late production improvements ===
During the course of 1943, a number of improvements were gradually introduced. In an attempt to increase the pilot's field of view an armoured glass head-rest, the so-called Galland Panzer was developed, and subsequently began replacing the bulky armour plate in the spring of 1943. Towards the end of the year the clear-view, three-panel Erla Haube canopy appeared, named after the Erla Maschinenwerk sub-contractor involved in building new examples, and upgrading older examples of the Bf 109. Often misnamed the "Galland Hood" in postwar Western aviation books and periodicals, it eventually replaced the older heavily framed two-piece canopy – comprising the starboard side-hinged six-panel main canopy, and the three-panel fixed rear unit fastened to the fuselage – on the Bf 109G. The canopy structure was completely redesigned to incorporate a greater area of clear perspex; the welded framing for the three-panel Erla Haube design was reduced to a minimum and there was no longer a fixed rear portion, with the entire structure aft of the windscreen being hinged to swing to starboard when opened.

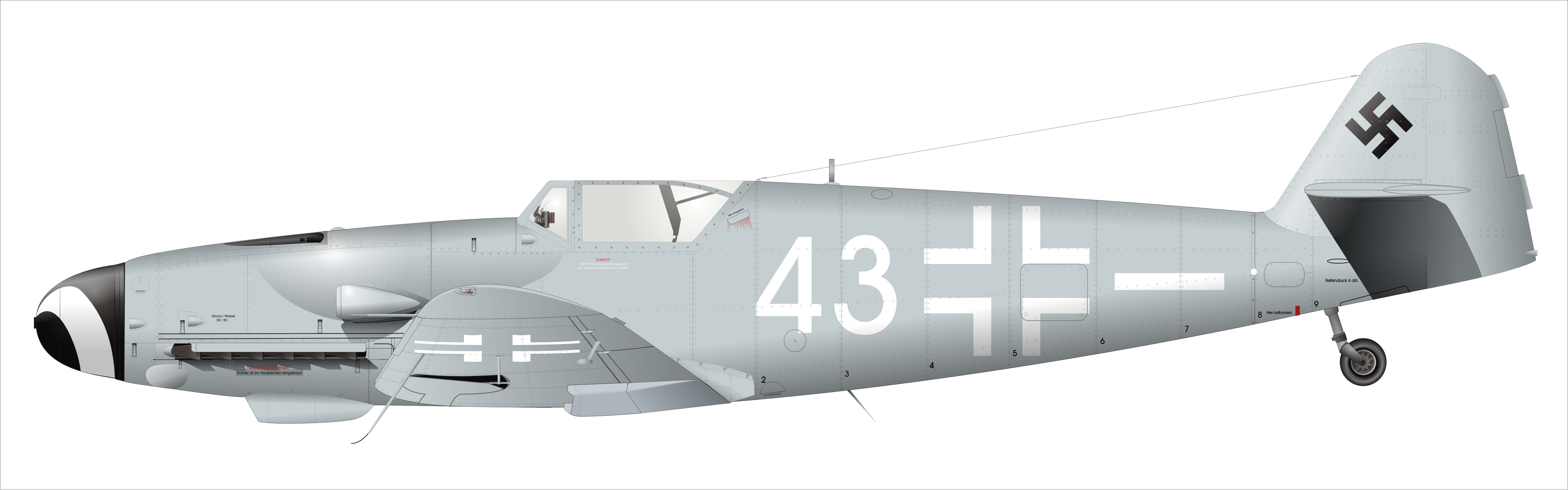
A 1945-era Bf 109G-10 of JG 3, showing the revised lines in the upper cowl area that replaced the Beule blisters for its MG 131 gun breeches

The Bf 109 G-10, AS-engined G-5/AS, G-6/AS and G-14/AS, as well as the K-4, saw a refinement of the engine cowlings. The formerly separate, added-on Beule blisters which had earlier covered the spent shell-casing chutes of the synchronized fuselage-mount MG 131s were completely integrated into the upper cowling panels, vastly improving their streamlining and allowing them to be lengthened and enlarged to cover both the weapons and the engine bearers. Initial prototype versions were symmetrical, but as larger superchargers were fitted, the engines required modified upper engine bearers to clear the supercharger housing, and as a result the final shape of the new cowling was asymmetrical, being enlarged on the port side where the supercharger was mounted on the DB engine. There were also special streamlined panels fitted to the forward fuselage. These so-called agglomerations could be seen in several different patterns. Because of their aerodynamically more efficient form in a side-view of DB 605AS and D -powered Bf 109 Gs and Ks, the agglomerations were barely discernible compared with the conspicuous fairings they replaced. The Erla, WNF and Messerschmitt Regensburg factories each produced their own variant of the engine cowling. The differences were minor but, along with distinct camouflage patterns applied at each plant, allows for identification of sub-types in old black and white photographs.

Some versions of the G-6 and later Gs had a taller, wood-structure tail unit and redesigned rudder with an inset rudder balance protruding forward into the fin which improved stability at high speeds. The introduction of the WGr. 21 cm (8 in) under-wing mortar/rockets and the 30 mm (1.18 in) MK 108 cannon increased firepower. Certain production batches of the Bf 109G were fitted with aileron Flettner tabs to decrease stick forces at high speeds. A radio-navigational method, the Y-Verfahren (Y-Guidance) was introduced with the FuG 16ZY.

Subsequent Bf 109G versions were essentially modified versions of the basic G-6 airframe. Early in 1944, new engines with larger superchargers for improved high-altitude performance (DB 605AS), or with MW-50 water injection for improved low/medium-altitude performance (DB 605AM), or these two features combined (DB 605ASM) were introduced into the Bf 109 G-6. Maximum speed of the G-5/G-6 was 530 km/h (320 mph) at sea level, 640 km/h (391 mph) at 6,600 m (21,650 ft)-rated altitude at 1.42 atm boost.

== Bf 109 Heinrich ==
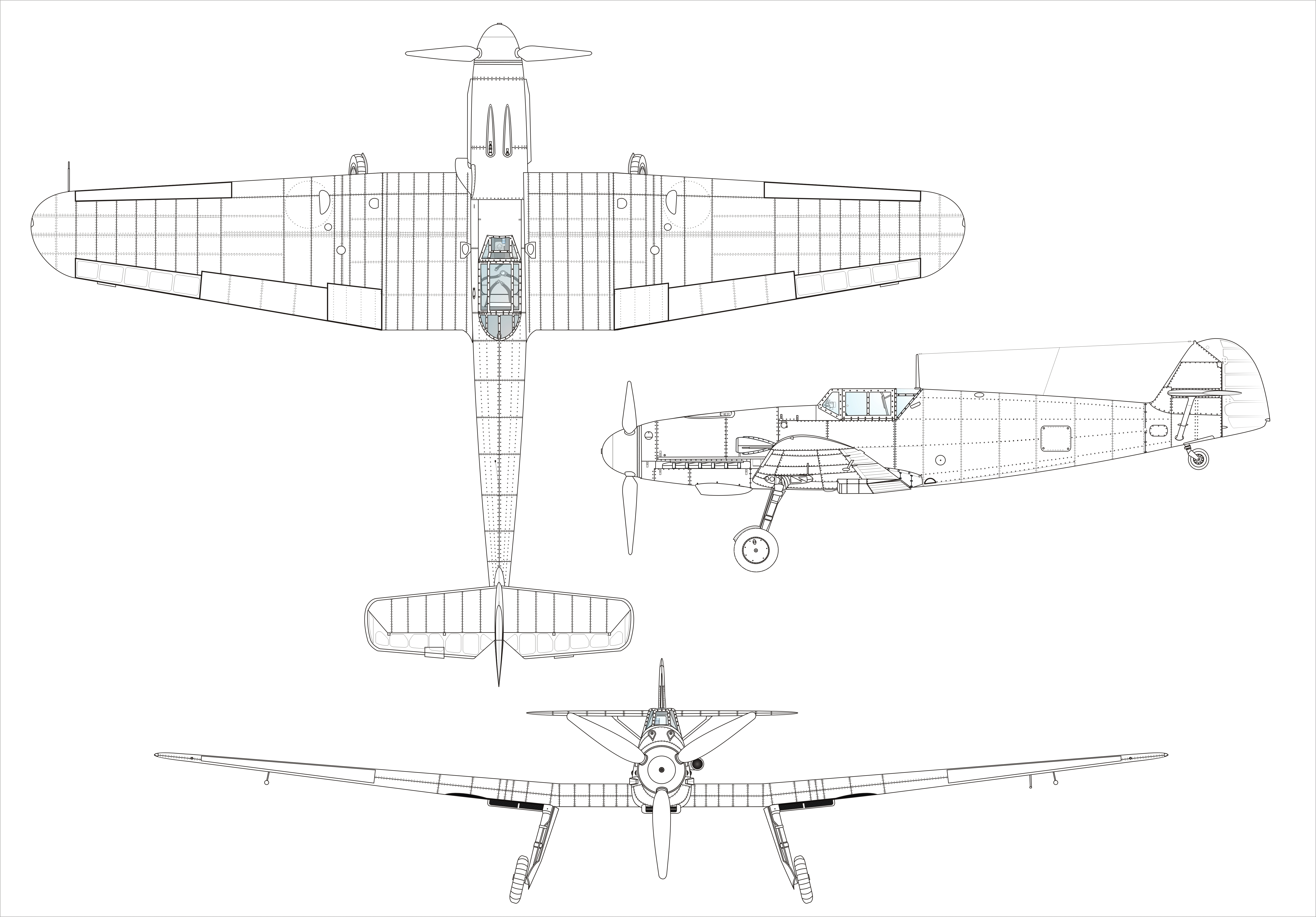
Messerschmitt Bf 109H-1

The Bf 109H was intended to be a high-altitude fighter, developed from the F-series. The wingspan was increased through the addition of new, constant-chord inner wing panels to 11.92 m (39.11 ft), and the widened stabilizer again received a supporting strut leading from the fuselage, like the B through E models. Maximum speed was 750 km/h (470 mph) at 10,100 m (33,140 ft). A small number of Bf 109 H-1s were built, flying several sorties over Britain and France. Bf 109H-2 and H-5 developments were also planned, but the entire H-series was scrapped because of wing flutter problems.

- H-0 (Pre-production aircraft, rebuilt from F-4/Z, powered by a DB 601E engine with GM-1 boost)
- H-1 (Production version, based on G-5 airframes, powered by a DB 605A engine with GM-1 boost)

A record exists of one particular Bf 109H-1, Werknummer 110073, was recorded as having been converted to a photo-recon aircraft by a Luftwaffe long-range reconnaissance group, Fernaufklärungsgruppe 123, in May 1944, and flown on dates immediately following the Invasion of Normandy with one mission meant to scan the entire French coastline from Cherbourg to Ouistreham, from an altitude of some 15 km (49,200 ft), which proved to be just beyond the achievable ceiling of the selected aircraft.

== Bf 109 Kurfürst ==
The Bf 109K was the last of the series to see operational duty and the last in the Bf 109 evolutionary line. The K series was a response to the bewildering array of series, models, modification kits and factory conversions for the Bf 109, which made production and maintenance complicated and costly – something Germany could not afford late in the war. The RLM ordered Messerschmitt to rationalise production of the Bf 109, consolidating parts and types to produce a standard model with more interchangeable parts and equipment; flaws in the design of the airframe were also to be remedied. Work on the new version began in the spring of 1943 and the prototype was ready by autumn.

=== K-0, K-1, K-2, K-3 ===
Pre-production aircraft, K-0, was powered by a DB 605DM engine.

Proposed versions includes the K-1, which was supposed to replace the G-5 in production at Erla from July 1944. It was specified to be equipped with a pressurized cockpit akin to the G-5. The K-2 was a proposed version without pressurized cockpit. Quantity production was also planned of a K-3 fighter series, including a recon version, the K-3/R2, with a pressurized cockpit.

=== K-4 ===
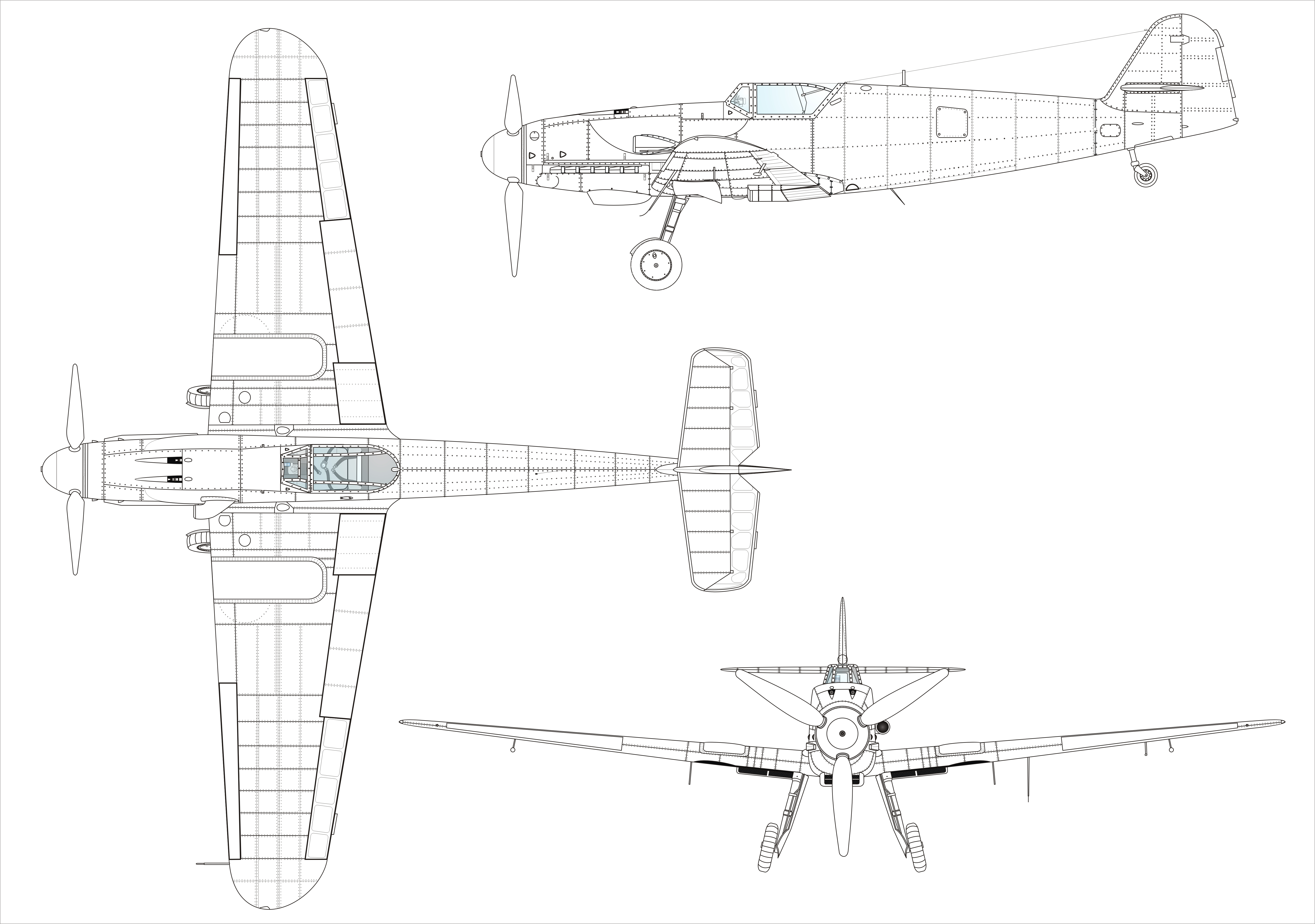
Messerschmitt Bf 109 K-4

Series production of the K-series started in August 1944 with the K-4 model, due to changes in the design and delays with the new DB 605D powerplant. The K-4 was the only version to be mass-produced.

Externally the K series could be identified by changes in the locations of the radio equipment hatch, which was moved forward and to a higher position between frames four and five and the filler point for the fuselage fuel tank, which was moved forward to a location between frames two and three. (Note: The shape of the hatch was changed in that the lower edge sloped up slightly to the front.) The D/F loop was moved aft to sit between frames three and four on the fuselage spine and a small circular plate above the footstep on the port side of the fuselage was deleted. The rudder was fitted as standard with a Flettner tab and two fixed tabs although some rare examples were not fitted with the fixed tabs. All K-4s were to be fitted with a long retractable tail wheel (350 mm × 135 mm (13.8 in × 5.3 in)) with two small clamshell doors covering the recess when the tail-wheel was retracted.

The wings featured the large rectangular fairings for the large 660 mm × 190 mm (26.0 in × 7.5 in) main wheels. Small wheel well doors, originally planned for the G series, were fitted to the outer ends of the wheel bays, covering the outer wheels when retracted. These doors were often removed by front-line units. The radio equipment was the FuG 16ZY with the relocated main swept-forward radio antenna under the port wing from the G-10 being carried through as the standard for the K-series airframes. The FuG 25a Erstling IFF system, as well as the FuG 125 Hermine D/F equipment were also fitted. Internally, the oxygen bottles were relocated from the rear fuselage to the right wing. Flettner tabs for the ailerons were also to be fitted to serial production aircraft to reduce control forces but were extremely rare, with the majority of the K-4s using the same aileron system as the G series.

Armament of the K-4 consisted of a 30 mm (1.2 in) MK 108 engine gun (German: Motorkanone) with 65 rounds and two 13 mm (0.51 in) MG 131s in the nose with 300 rpg, although some K-4s were fitted with the MG 151/20 as the Motorkanone. Additional Rüstsätze (equipment kits) such as a 300 L (80 US gal) drop tank (R III), bombs up to the size of 500 kg (1,100 lb) (R I), underwing 20 mm Mauser MG 151/20 cannon gondola pods (R IV) or 21 cm (8.3 in) Wfr.Gr. 21 rockets (as on the Gustav models) could be carried after minimal preparation; the latter two were rarely used by Bf 109 units at this stage of the war, although III./JG 26 were almost completely equipped with K-4s which were fitted with R IV:

...apparently all of the K-4s supplied to III./JG 26 were also equipped with 20 mm-guns in the hated underwing tubs. Uffz. Georg Genth's regular aircraft was a G-10, but on occasion he flew a K-4. He preferred the G-10 as a dogfighter, as the K-4's bulky armament sharply reduced its manoeuvrability.

— Caldwell

There were problems with the 30 mm (1.2 in) MK 108 Motorkanone, which often jammed while the aircraft was manoeuvring in battle, leaving the pilot to fight on with the two MG 131 heavy machine guns. The standard Revi 16C reflector sight was fitted, which was slated to be replaced by the EZ 42 Gyro gunsight, although this never happened.

Power in production K-4s was supplied by the Daimler-Benz DB 605 DB/DC engine (very early K-4s used the earlier DM). The DB/DC engine had an adjusting screw allowing the engine to use either B4 + MW 50 Methanol Water injection equipment or C3 fuel (DB 605 DB) or C3 fuel with MW 50 (DB 605 DC). The DB when using B4 fuel with MW 50 had an emergency power rating of 1,600 PS at 6,000 m (1,160 PS maximum continual at 6,600 m) and generated take-off power of 1,850 PS at 0 m at a maximum supercharger boost of 1.8 ata. The DB could also be run on higher octane C3 fuel, but the use of MW 50 was forbidden. The DC ran on C3 fuel and had a potential to generate 2,000 PS when using C3 fuel with MW 50, and a boost of 1.98 ata, but otherwise the power ratings were similar to that of the DB. (Note: The shortage of C3 fuel and other problems meant that it was doubtful that 1.98 ata boost was ever used operationally, apart from being tested by II./JG 11.) A wide-chord, three-bladed VDM 9-12159A propeller of 3 m (9.8 ft) diameter was used, as on the G-6/AS, G-14/AS and G-10.

Deliveries began in mid-October 1944 and 534 examples had been delivered by the Messerschmitt A.G., Regensburg by the end of November and 856 by the end of the year. Regensburg delivered a total of 1,593 by the end of March 1945, after which production figures are missing. With such a high rate of production, despite continuous heavy fighting, by the end of January 1945, 314 K-4s – about every fourth 109 – were listed on hand with the first line Luftwaffe units. Ultimately it was intended to equip all Bf 109 units with the 109K, which marked the final stage of 109 development before the jet age.

Using MW 50 and maximum boost the Bf 109 K-4 was the fastest 109 of World War II, reaching a maximum speed of 710 km/h (440 mph) at 7,500 m (24,600 ft) altitude. Without MW 50 and using 1.80 ata the K-4 reached 670 km/h (416 mph) at 9,000 m (30,000 ft). The initial rate of climb was 850 m (2,790 ft)/min, without MW 50 and 1,080 m (3,540 ft)/min, using MW 50. (Note: Improved propellers were being developed when the war ended which would have boosted the speed to 727 km/h (452 mph); 741 km/h (459 mph) was expected with an experimental swept-back propeller design.)

The Bf 109 remained comparable to opposing fighters until the end of the war but the deteriorating quality of the thousands of novice Luftwaffe pilots pressed into service by this stage of the war meant the 109's strengths were of little value against the numerous and well-trained Allied fighter pilots.

=== K-6, K-8, K-10, K-12 ===
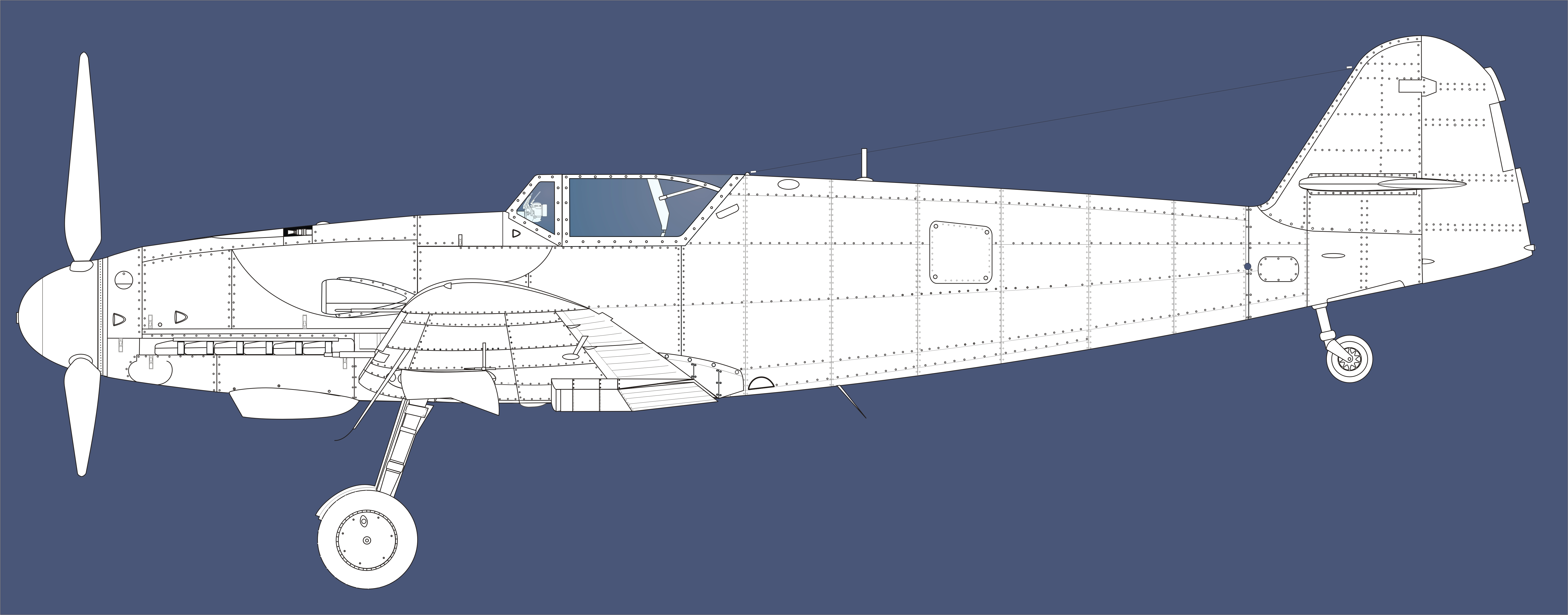
Bf 109 K-6.

Several other versions were projected based on the 109K airframe – K-6, K-8, K-10 and K-14.

In the proposed K-6 the armament would have been two 13 mm (.51 in) MG 131 above the engine, along with a 30 mm (1.18 in) MK 108 engine gun (German: Motorkanone) and an internally mounted MK 108 in each wing, with 45 rpg. Alternatively, the wing MK 108s could be substituted by 20 mm MG 151/20s, with 100 rpg. Armour weight was increased to 90 kg (200 lb). Takeoff weight was 3,600 kg (7,900 lb).

Some K-6 prototypes were built and tested at the Erprobungstelle Tarnewitz weapons-testing centre on the Baltic coast.

Project drawings of the K-8 show a K-series airframe powered by the two-stage DB 605L high altitude engine, a high-velocity 30 mm (1.18 in) MK 103 Motorkanone, and two 30 mm (1.18 in) MK 108 cannons in the wings; the cowl 13 mm (.51 in) MG 131s were dispensed with.

A proposed K-10 version was similar to the K-6 but featured a 30 mm MK 103M engine cannon instead of a 30 mm MK 108.

A proposed K-12 version mirrored the G-12 and was a dual-seat trainer.

=== K-14 ===
The K-14 was to be powered by the two-stage supercharged DB 605L engine, using a four-bladed propeller. 760 km/h (470 mph), and an operational altitude of 12,000 m (39,000 ft) was projected. Armour and armament were otherwise similar to the K-6.

Some sources point to limited use of the K-14, intended as high-altitude heavy fighter. Two airframes are listed as delivered to II./JG52 under Major Wilhelm Batz in late spring of 1945, these being armed with only one 30 mm (1.18 in) cannon, but the type's existence cannot be positively confirmed.

=== List of Kurfürst variants ===
Common Rüstsatz kits, Bf 109K

- R I ETC 501/IX b or Schloß 503belly bomb rack, fusing equipment for fitting a 250 kg (550 lb) or 500 kg (1,100 lb) bomb
- R III Schloß 503A-1 rack for one fuselage drop tank (300 L/80 US gal).
- R IV BSK 16 gun-camera in the left wing between nose ribs 3 and 4.
- R VI two 20 mm Mauser MG 151/20 underwing gunpods with 135 rpg.

Known variants

- K-0 Pre-production aircraft, powered by a DB 605DM engine
- K-1 supposed to replace the G-5 in production at Erla from July 1944 and it was specified that, like the G-5, the K-1 was to be equipped with a pressurized cockpit.
- K-2 proposed version without pressurized cockpit
- K-3 quantity production was also planned of a K-3 series which was to be built as a fighter and, in its K-3/R2 form, as a reconnaissance aircraft with a pressurized cockpit.
- K-4 only serial production version without pressurized cockpit, powered by a DB 605DM (early pdn) or DB/DC engine
- K-6 proposed heavy fighter version, as K-4 with reinforced wings holding two additional 30 mm MK 108 cannons and additional armour
- K-8 proposed reconnaissance version, equipment similar to G-8
- K-10 proposed version, similar to K-6, MK 103M engine cannon instead of MK 108
- K-12 proposed version, dual-seat trainer similar to G-12
- K-14 proposed version, similar to K-6, powered by a DB 605L engine

== Bf 109 Träger ==
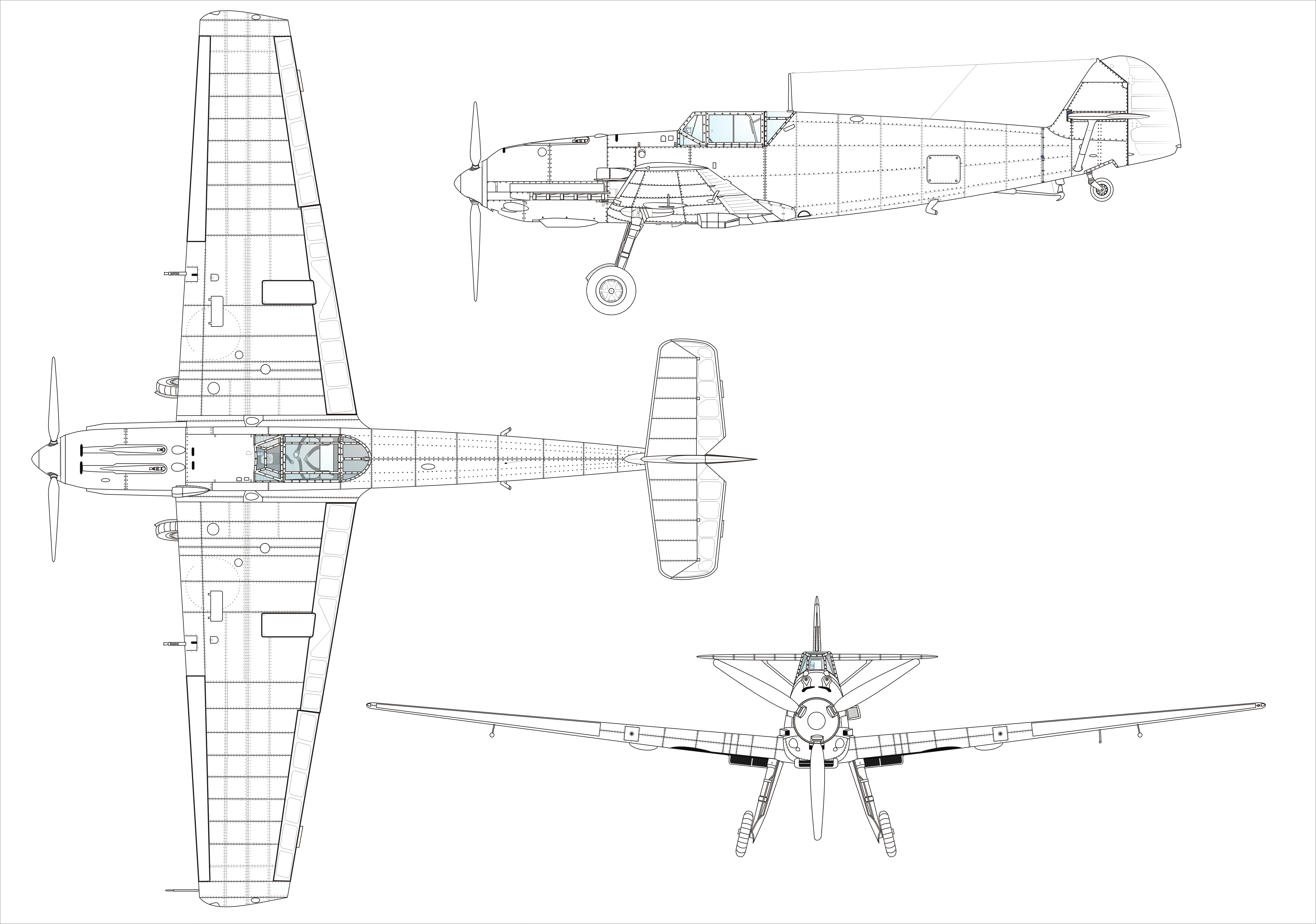
Bf 109T-1

Prior to the war, the Kriegsmarine had become fascinated with the idea of the aircraft carrier. Borrowing ideas from the British and Japanese (mainly Akagi), they started the construction of Graf Zeppelin as part of the rebuilding of the navy. The air group for the carrier was settled on Messerschmitt Bf 109T fighters and Ju 87C dive bombers. The suffix 'T' denotes Trägerflugzeug (carrier-based aircraft) in German use.

Despite references to a Bf 109 T-0 version, this version never existed. Seven earlier versions (Bf 109 B, Bf 109 C, Bf 109 E) were converted to test carrier equipment. This included adding a tail-hook, catapult fittings and increasing the wingspan to 11.08 m (36.35 ft). The ailerons were increased in span, as were the slats, and flap travel was increased. The wings were not modified to be folding since the ship Graf Zeppelin was designed around the intended aircraft, so the lifts could accommodate the Bf 109T with its 11 m (36 ft) wingspan. The wings could, however, be detached from the fuselage for transport purposes, as in every version of the Bf 109.

Following flight tests, especially the catapult tests, 70 T-1 with DB601Ns were to be produced at Fieseler in Kassel, but after seven T-1s were built, the carrier project was cancelled. The remaining 63 of 70 T-1s were built as T-2s without carrier equipment and some of the T-1s may have been "upgraded" to T-2 standard. It was found that the performance of the T-2 was closely comparable to the E-4/N and, because of its ability to take off and land in shorter distances, these fighters were assigned to I/JG.77, deployed in Norway on landing strips which were both short and subject to frequent, powerful cross-winds. At the end of 1941 the unit was ordered to return their aircraft to Germany and received E-3s as replacements. The armament of the Bf 109T consisted of two 7.92 mm (.312 in) MG 17s above the engine and one 20 mm MG FF/M cannon in each wing.

Interest in Graf Zeppelin revived when the value of aircraft carriers became obvious, and in 1942 the ship was back in the yards for completion. By this time, the Bf 109T was hopelessly outdated and a new fighter would be needed. Messerschmitt responded with the updated Me 155A series, but work on the ship was again canceled and the Me 155 was later re-purposed as a high-altitude interceptor. Design work was transferred to Blohm & Voss and the aircraft was then known as the BV 155.

The Bf 109Ts were issued to several training units in 1943. Then, in April 1943, the Jagdstaffel Helgoland was formed and operated from Düne until late 1943, when the unit transferred to Lista in south Norway. The unit was renamed as 11./JG 11 as of 30 November 1943 and the Bf 109Ts remained in operation until the summer of 1944, after which some were used in training units in Germany.

== Bf 109 Turbolader ==
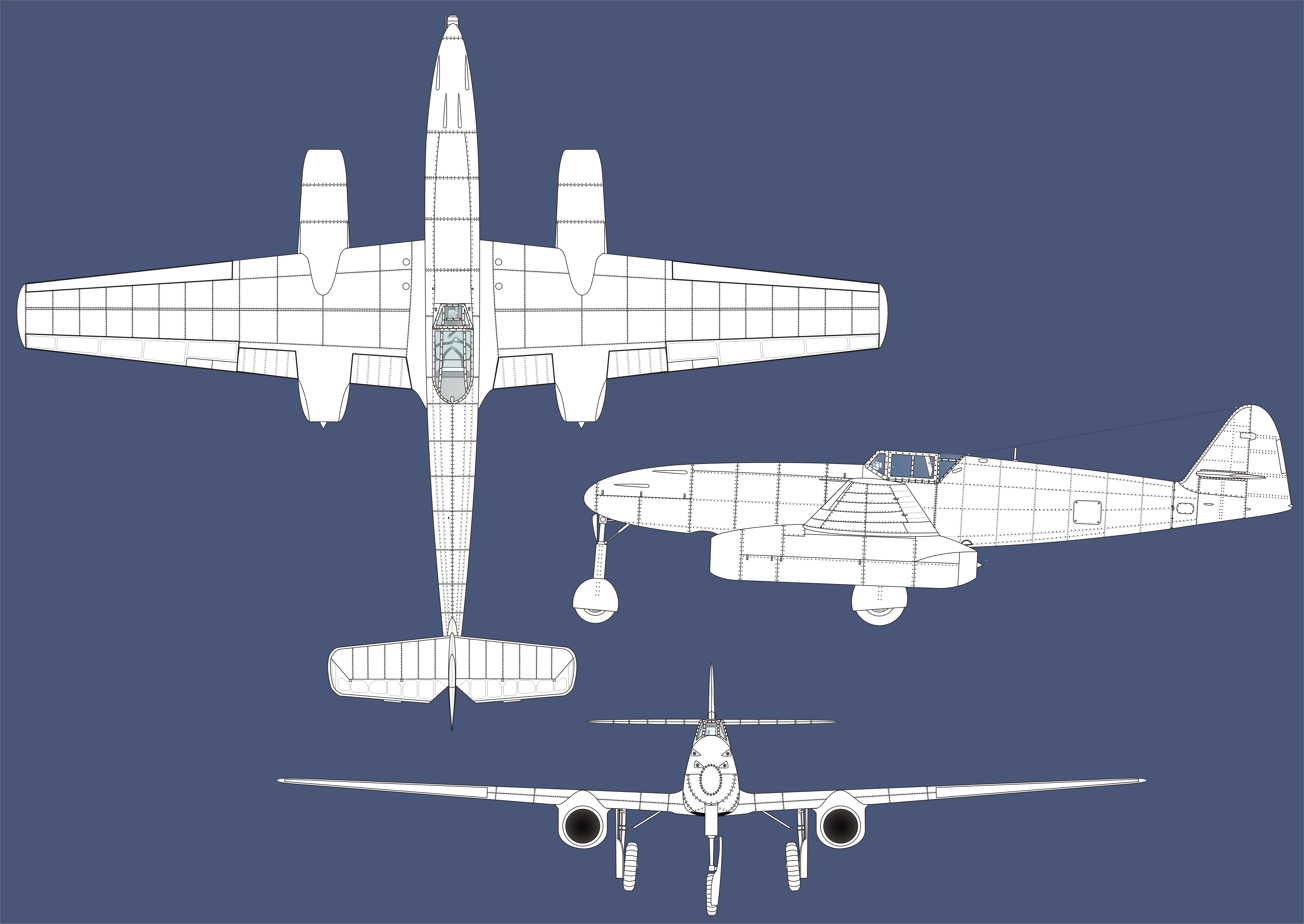
Bf 109TL

The Bf 109TL (Turbolader, "turbocharger") was first proposed on 22 January 1943 at an RLM conference; at the time only three prototypes of the Me 262 had been completed. The Bf 109TL would be a backup if the Me 262 did not come to production or as a second fighter to operate alongside the Me 262.

In order to reduce development time, various components from previous aircraft were to be used. The fuselage was to come from the Bf 109H/BV 155B high-altitude fighter (with a new nose and tail section), the wing was from the Me 409 project and the tricycle undercarriage came from the Me 309. The powerplant would be the same Junkers Jumo 004B-1 turbojet (900 kgf thrust) or BMW 003A (800 kgf).

The basic armament was to be two 20 mm MG 151/20 cannons (with 120 rpg) and two MK 103 cannons mounted in the nose. An additional proposal was two 30 mm (1.18 in) MK 108 cannons to be installed in the wing roots. The pilot cockpit used in the prototypes was the same as utilized in the Bf 109E/G types.

The performance was estimated to be possibly better than the Me 262 due to the Bf 109TL's narrower fuselage, a product of the design for a high-speed high-altitude fighter. The Bf 109TL received intensive research. By March 1943, it was decided that many other modifications to components would be needed and the project was abandoned in order to concentrate on the Me 262 project.

== Bf 109 X (radial engine) ==
After the success of the demonstration at the meeting of Zürich in 1937, Udet was receptive to the idea of developing an export version of the Bf 109 but with a different engine than the DB 601. The engine chosen was the Pratt & Whitney R-1830 of 1200 hp. The Messerschmitt company received a contract from RLM/LC on 13 June 1938 to fit the P&W Twin Wasp on the Bf 109 V21 (21st prototype) Werknummer 1770 (D-IFKQ). Even the maiden flight date is not known; it is established that Hermann Wurster flew it at Augsburg on 17 August 1939. In September 1940 it was part of the DVL (Deutsche Versuchsanstalt für Luftfahrt) at Brauschweig-Völkenrode with the Stammkennzeichen code KB+II. Its end is not known.

As the BMW 801 radial engine became available, a Bf 109F, Werknummer 5608, callsign D-ITXP was converted with a BMW 801 A-0. This aircraft became a prototype for the Bf 109X. The fuselage had a wider cross-section, and a new canopy was fitted. The wing tips were akin to that of the Bf 109E. The prototype was first flown by Flugkapitän Fritz Wendel on 2 September 1940, and the test flights continued despite troubles with the BMW 801A powerplant. Development was stopped in early 1942.

== Bf 109 Zwilling ==
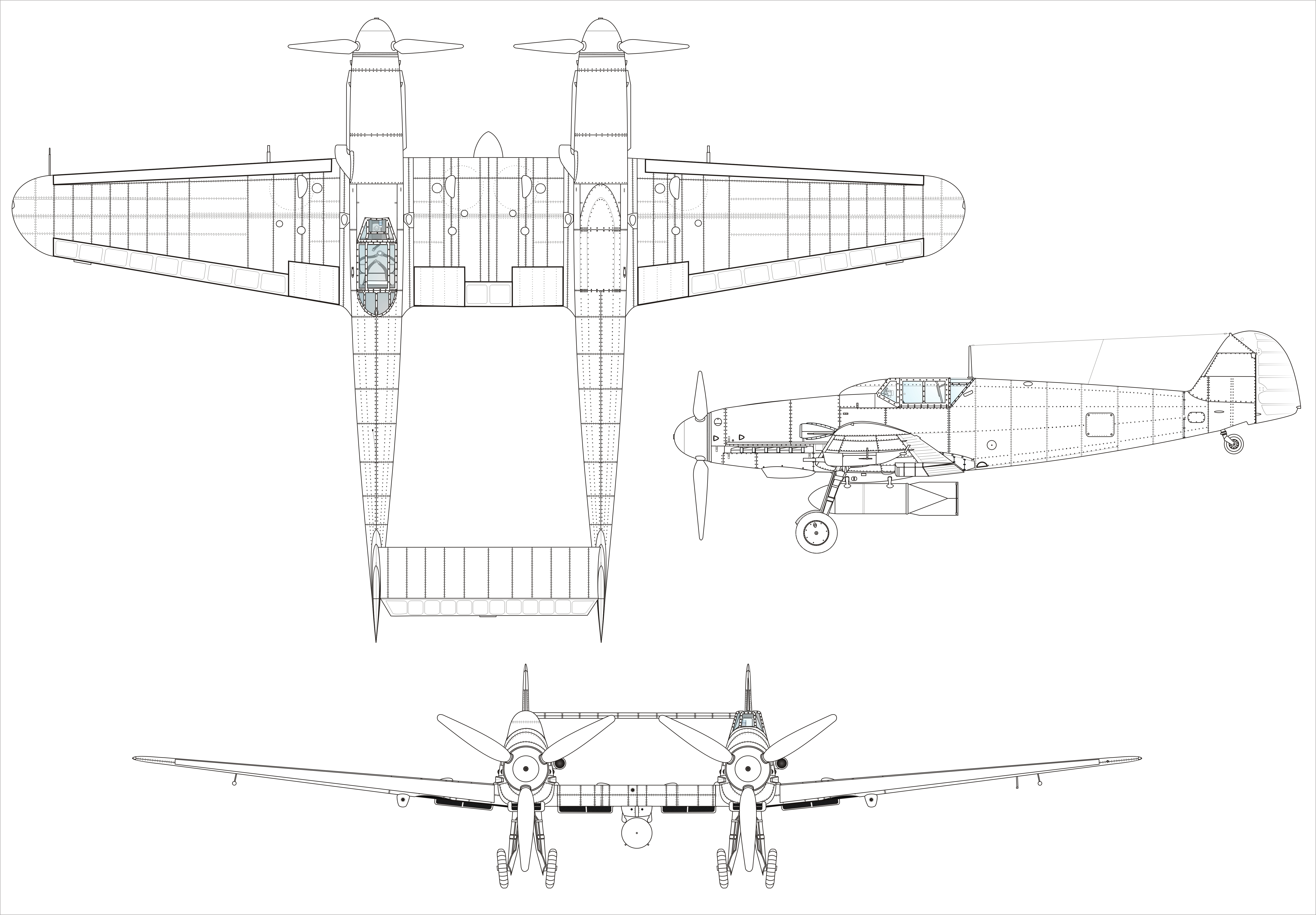
Bf 109Z-1

This experimental aircraft was essentially two Bf 109F airframes joined by means of a new wing centre section and new tailplane, both of constant chord, in a manner paralleled by the F-82 Twin Mustang. In the preproduction model, the right fuselage cockpit was faired over and the pilot flew the aircraft from the left side fuselage. Additional modifications included setting the main undercarriage hinges further inboard, with associated strengthening of the fuselage and modifications to the wing forward structure. Four variants of this aircraft were proposed. One was an interceptor armed with five 30 mm (1.18 in) cannon and up to a 1,000 kg (2,200 lb) bomb load, another a fighter-bomber armed with two MK 108 cannon and up to two 2,200 lb. bombs. Both airframes were to be powered by the DB605 engine. A third and fourth were designed on paper and would be similar to the first two airframes but powered by Jumo 213 engines. The Bf 109Z was submitted for the November 1942 Schnellstbomber competition but because the Dornier Do 335 won the contest, the Bf 109Z was not built.

== Fieseler and Skoda FiSk 199 ==
Experimental version of Bf 109G-2/R1 with extra landing gear, one ventral 250 kg bomb and two drop tanks under wings.

== Developments after World War II ==
=== Czechoslovak production ===
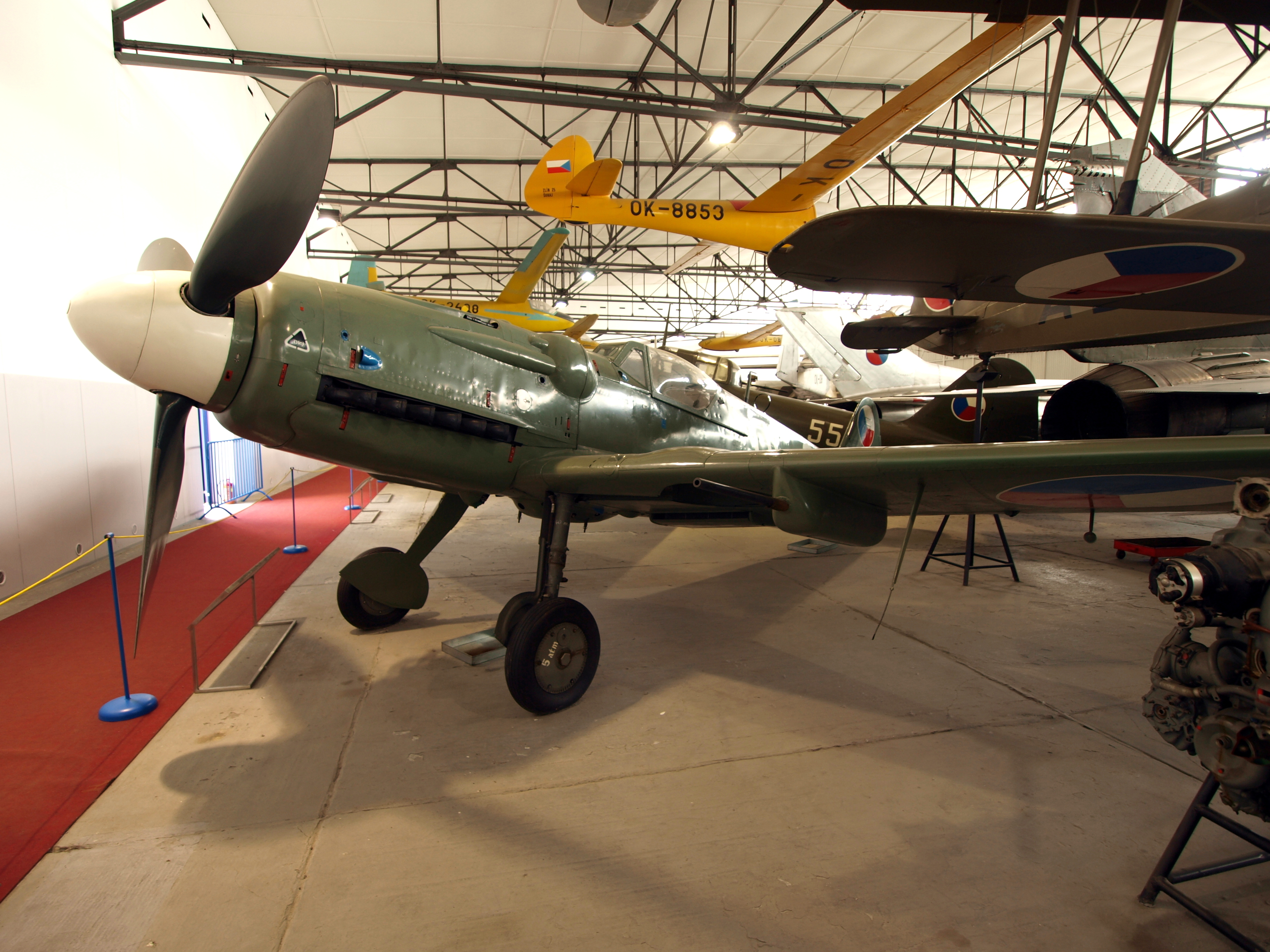
Avia S-199 at the Kbely Aviation Museum, 2012

After the war, some Bf 109s were produced in Czechoslovakia as the Avia S-99 and Avia S-199. These were modified Bf 109G-14s, the latter with the inferior Junkers Jumo 211F engine, which resulted in an aircraft with remarkably poor handling characteristics and a tendency to crash during landings. As noted above, Czech pilots who had previously flown Spitfires for the RAF nicknamed the aircraft Mezek ("Mule"). They were replaced in frontline service by Soviet jets in 1952, but flew on as trainers for another five years.

Several of the S-199s were sold to Israel, forming the basis of the fledgeling Israeli Air Force.

=== Spanish production ===
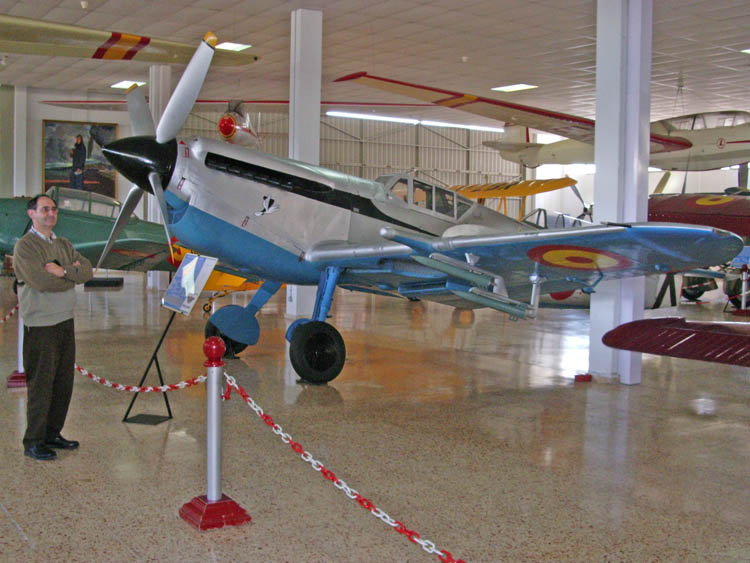
Hispano Aviación HA-1112 Buchon, the second and last Spanish version built by Hispano Aviación

In Spain, two versions of the Bf 109G-2, the Hispano Aviación HA-1112 "Tripala" and "Buchón", were built under license, the former with the Hispano-Suiza engine, and the latter with the same Rolls-Royce Merlin engines that had powered Spitfires. Many of these aircraft have been used for theatrical purposes, posing (rather obviously, given their very distinctive undernose air intakes, mandated by the R-R Merlin engines they used) as "Emils" and "Gustavs" in Battle of Britain and The Tuskegee Airmen, respectively. These modifications were carried out in the Hispano Aviación factory in Seville. Germany had agreed to let Spain have 25 un-assembled Bf 109G-2s to help familiarize the Spanish with the type. The wings and airframes arrived but not the engines, so the Spanish installed the French Hispano-Suiza engine, and then fitted Rolls-Royce Merlins as late as 1956. A few were still in active service until the late 1960s. The Ha 1112 was produced until 1958.
