= Deperdussin Coupe Schneider =

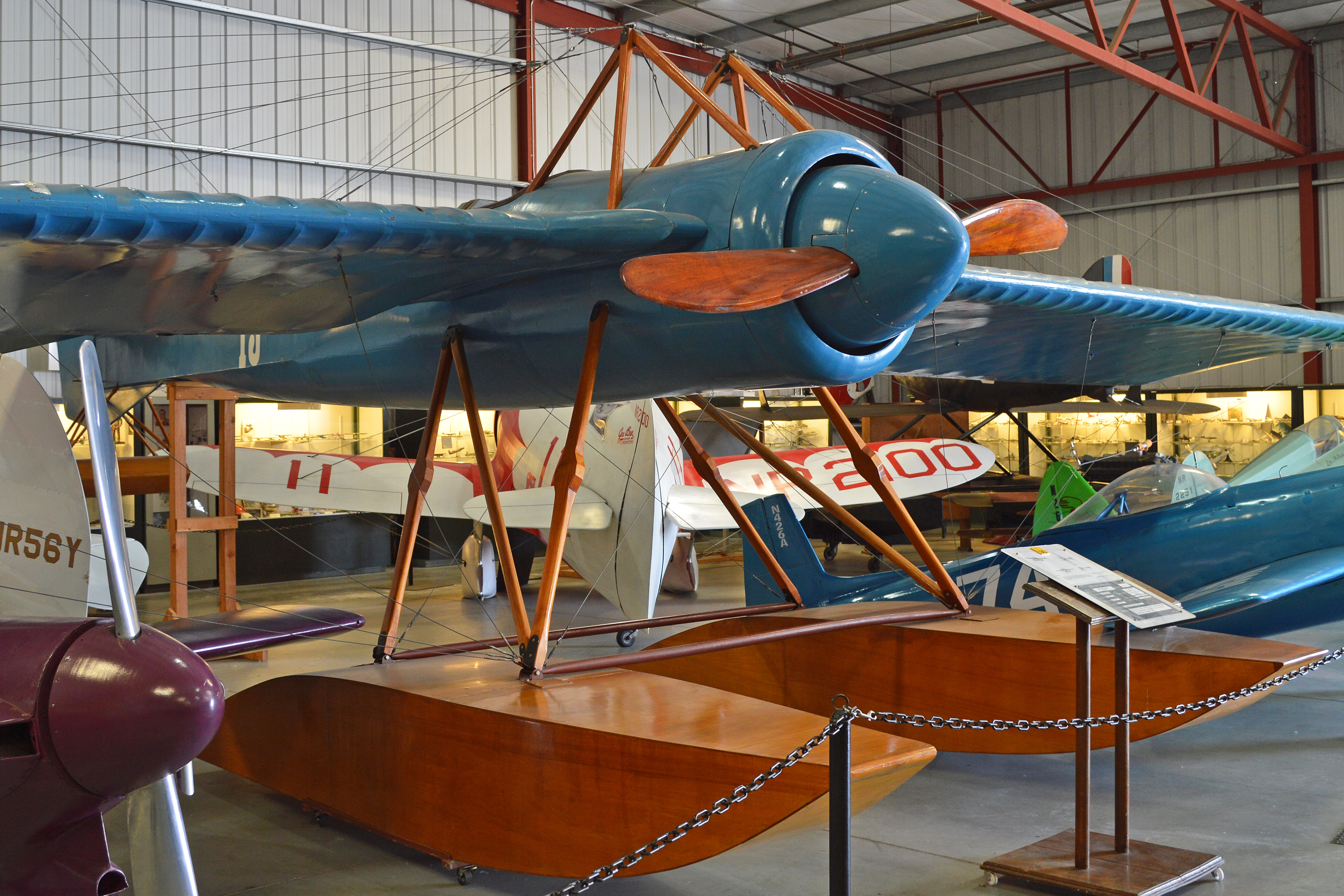
- Full-size model of Coupe Schneider, built for Leisure Sport and initially displayed at Thorpe Park; later sold and currently on display at the Planes of Fame Air Museum in Chino, California (2016)

General information
- Type: Racer
- Manufacturer: Société Pour les Appareils Deperdussin (SPAD)
- Designer: Louis Béchereau

History
- First flight: 1913

The Deperdussin Coupe Schneider was an early racing aircraft built in 1913 by the Aéroplanes Deperdussin, a French aircraft manufacturer started in 1911 and reorganized as the Société Pour L'Aviation et ses Dérivés (SPAD) in 1913. The aircraft is noted for winning the Schneider Trophy 1913.

== Design ==
The Deperdussin Coupe Schneider was a floatplane version of the Deperdussin Monocoque, and like the latter, had a mid-wing design and was of monocoque all-wood construction.

== Service history ==
It entered into the April 16, 1913 Schneider Cup race. Flying it, Maurice Prévost was awarded the Schneider Cup.

== Specifications ==
Data from

General characteristics

- Crew: 2
- Length: 9.98 m (32 ft 9 in)
- Wingspan: 13.49 m (44 ft 3 in)
- Gross weight: 1,200 kg (2,646 lb)
- Powerplant: 1 × Gnome Lambda-Lambda air cooled 14-cylinder two-row rotary, 120 kW (160 hp)
- Propellers: 2-bladed Chauvière, 2.31 m (7 ft 7 in) diameter

Performance

- Maximum speed: 120 km/h (75 mph, 65 kn)
