= Armand Deperdussin =

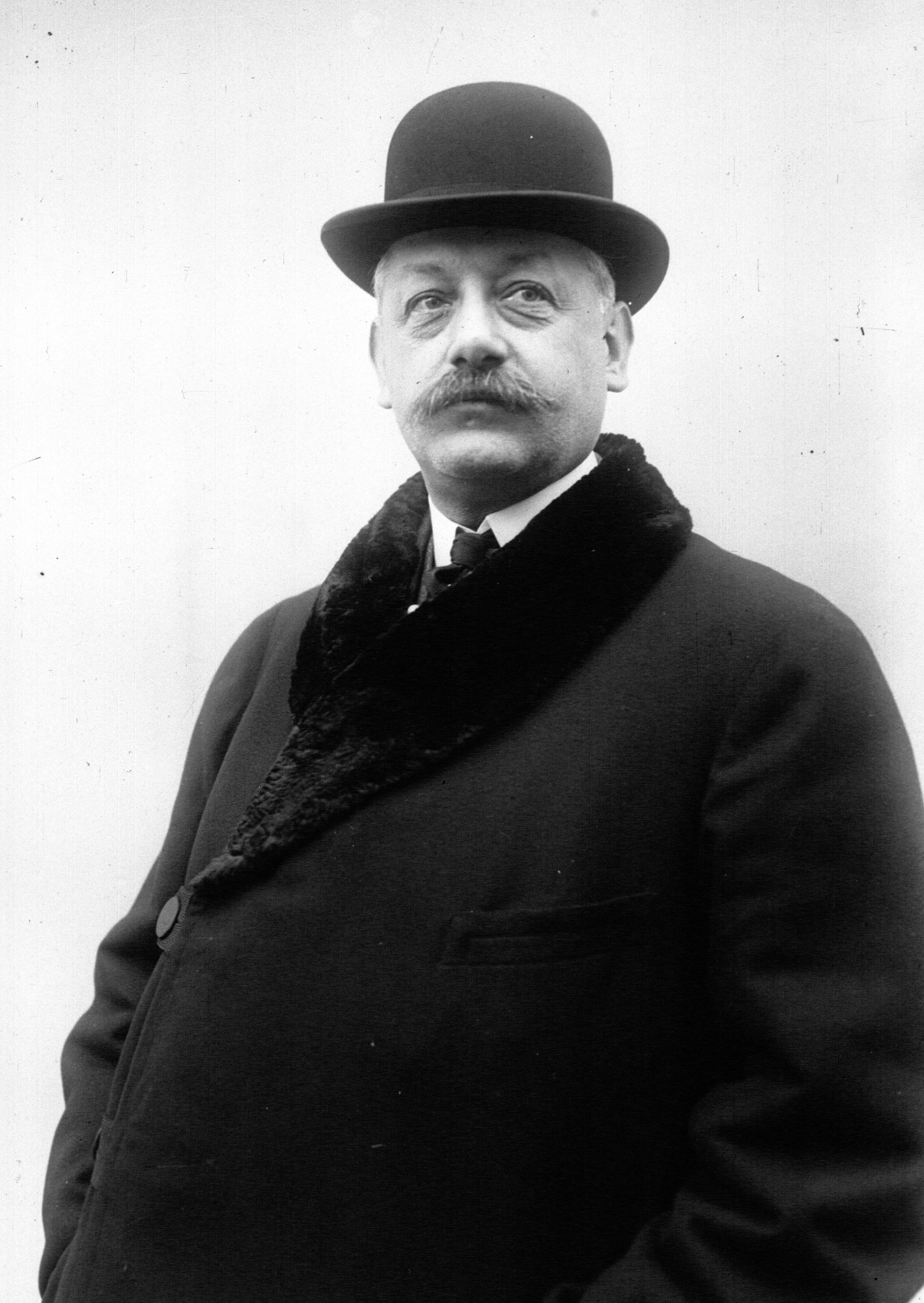
- Armand Deperdussin in 1913
- Born: 8 July 1864; Liège, Belgium
- Died: 11 June 1924 (aged 59); Paris, France
- Occupations: Industrialist, Aviation pioneer
- Known for: Founder of Société de Production des Aéroplanes Deperdussin, early aviation achievements
- Awards: Gordon Bennett Trophy (1912, 1913)

Armand Deperdussin (July 8, 1864 in Liège, Belgium – June 11, 1924 in Paris) was a French industrialist and aviation pioneer. Having established himself as a silk-broker, he became involved in the aviation industry in 1910 after witnessing the triumphs of aviator Louis Blériot, founding Société de Production des Aéroplanes Deperdussin.

In 1912 he bought Champagne Airfield, and built 30 workshops and other buildings, founding one of the first flying schools.

He hired aircraft designer Louis Béchereau, who designed monohull aircraft whose streamlined shapes achieved previously unattainable performance. With dedicated staff and revolutionary technical advances, the company won many prizes, especially the international Gordon Bennett Trophy in France in 1912 with pilot Jules Védrines, who became the first pilot to fly over 100 mph [169.6 km/h (105.4 mph)], and again in 1913 with pilot Maurice Prévost, who flew 200.8 km/h (124.8 mph).

The company went bankrupt in August 1913, and Deperdussin was disgraced in 1913 when he was accused of obtaining bank loans by fraud and forgery. He was not brought to trial until 1917, and on March 30, 1917 he was convicted of embezzling 32 million francs from his company, fined 1,000 francs, and jailed for five years.

The company was renamed the Société Pour L'Aviation et ses Dérivés (SPAD) when it was taken over by Blériot Aéronautique in 1914.

Deperdussin committed suicide in 1924.
