= SPAD S.XII =

French WW1 fighter aircraft

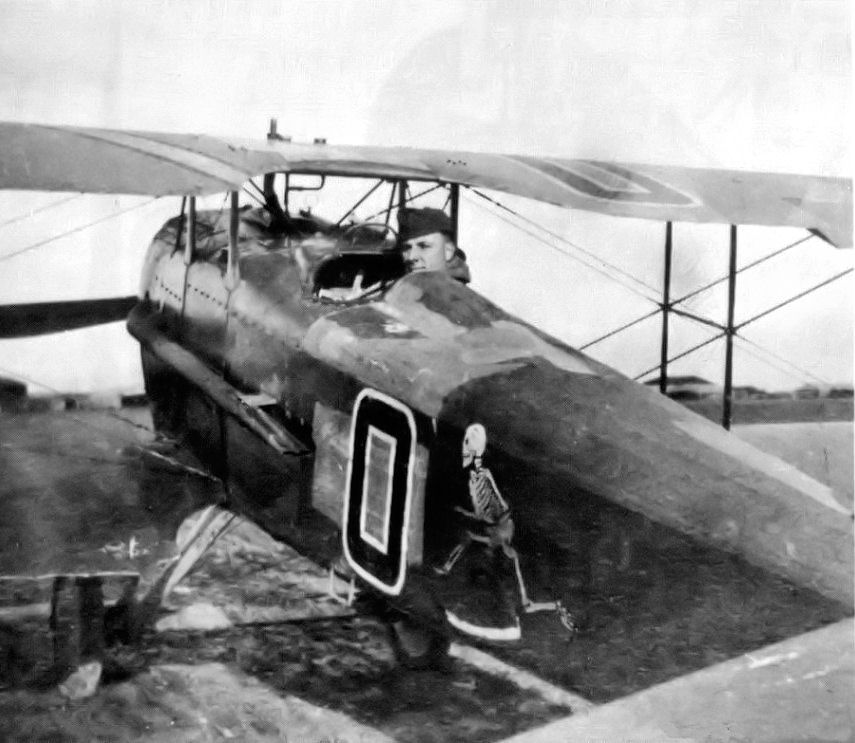
- The USAAS SPAD S.XII in 1918.

General information
- Type: Fighter
- National origin: France
- Manufacturer: SPAD
- Designer: Louis Béchereau
- Primary users: Aéronautique Militaire Red Army
- Number built: unknown, 300 ordered

History
- First flight: 5 July 1917
- Developed from: Spad S.VII

The SPAD S.XII or SPAD 12 was a French single-seat biplane fighter aircraft of the First World War developed from the successful SPAD VII by Louis Béchereau, chief designer of the Société Pour L'Aviation et ses Dérivés (SPAD).

== Development ==
The SPAD XII was inspired by the ideas of French flying ace Georges Guynemer, who proposed that a manoeuvrable single-seat aircraft be designed to carry a 37 mm cannon, a weapon which had previously been mounted only in large two-seat "pusher" aircraft such as the Voisin III. Béchereau took his own SPAD VII design as the starting point, but the many major and minor changes incorporated into the SPAD XII made it a quite different aircraft.

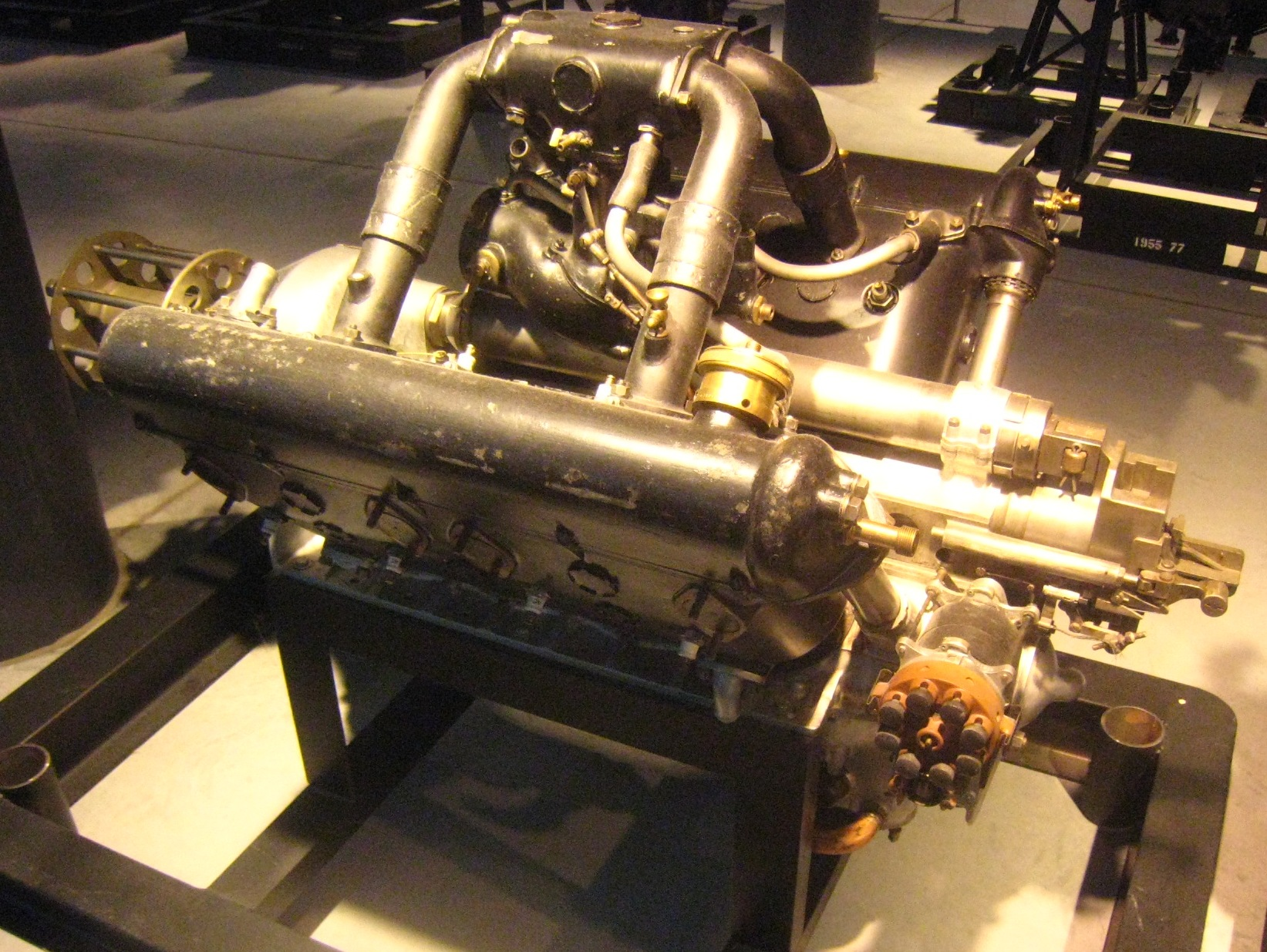
Restored HS.8Ca geared-output engine, similar to the 8Cb used on the SPAD S.XII

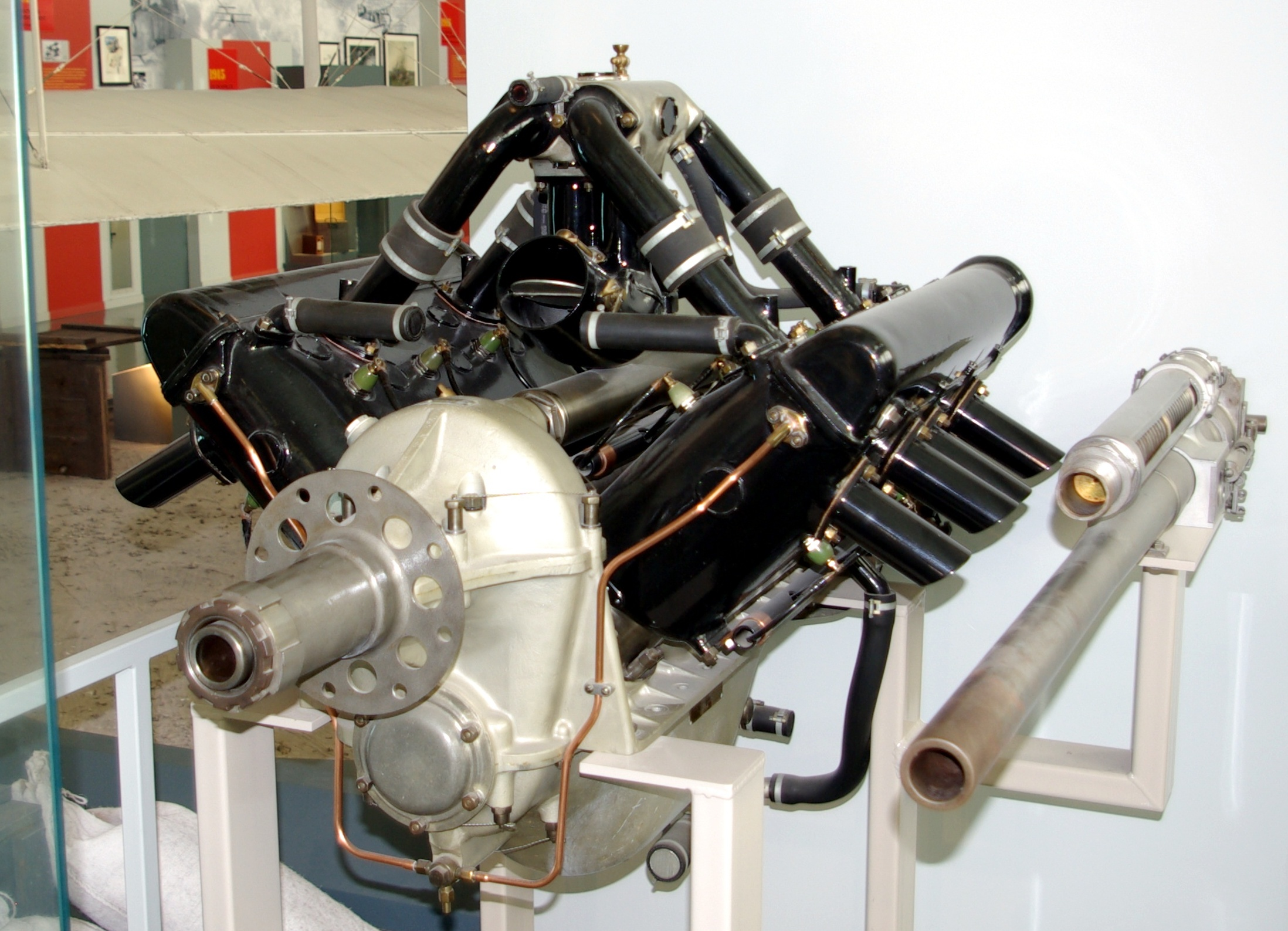
A geared-output shaft HS.8C engine for a SPAD S.XII, showing the elevated intake manifold to clear the 37mm cannon mounted in the "vee" between the cylinder banks.

The gun chosen for the SPAD XII was not the old Hotchkiss cannon but a new 37 mm Semi Automatique Moteur Canon (SAMC), built by Puteaux, for which 12 shots were carried. The Hispano-Suiza aviation engine had to be geared to allow the gun to fire through the propeller shaft, avoiding the problem of firing through the moving blades. The SPAD XII also carried a single 0.303 inch synchronized (7.7 mm) Vickers machine gun mounted on the starboard side of the nose. In order to carry the heavy cannon the airframe was lengthened and the wingspan and wing area increased. The wingtips were rounded rather than squared off and the wings given a slight forward stagger. To accommodate the required geared output propshaft engine with a hollow propeller shaft for the cannon to fire through, and power the airframe, weighing 587 kilograms (1,294 lb) rather than the 500 kilograms (1,100 lb) of the SPAD VII, the 180 bhp Hispano-Suiza 8 direct-drive Ab engine was replaced by the geared 220 bhp model 8Cb, which also gave the SPAD XII a clockwise (seen "nose-on") rotating propeller.

Test-flown by Guynemer, the early production models of the SPAD XII were highly successful after overcoming initial problems with the reduction gear between engine and propeller. Other aces also had success with the new model. However, deliveries were slow, the SPAD VII and later SPAD XIII having top priority, and even the modest total of 300 aircraft which were ordered were not all completed. Best estimates are only 20 produced. Average pilots found the SPAD XII a difficult aircraft to master, and the cannon difficult to aim and fire, while manual reloading was difficult. The cockpit filled with fumes upon every firing. The cannon's breech mechanism protruded into the cockpit and prevented the use of a conventional stick to control the aircraft, adding to pilots' difficulties. The control setup reverted to a split setup on either side of the pilot, a la Deperdussin.

== Service ==
The 13th Aero Squadron SPAD S.XII, showing the slight positive stagger of the wings.

No units were entirely equipped with SPAD XIIs. The unknown number of aircraft produced were issued in small numbers, intended for use only by the most skilled pilots, such as Rene Fonck, Lionel de Marmier, Fernand Henri Chavannes, Henri Hay de Slade, Albert Deullin and François Battesti. They were distributed one or two per squadron. Few were delivered to combat units, eight being recorded on strength in April and again in October; this may be contrasted with the thousands of SPAD VIIs and SPAD XIIIs in service. Single examples for testing were delivered to the Royal Flying Corps and one to the Aviation Section of the American Expeditionary Force, with the AEF's 13th Aero Squadron receiving the code "0", it was primarily flown by the 13th's Charles John Biddle.

== Operators ==
France

- French Air Force

Russia / Soviet Union

- Imperial Russian Air Force
- Soviet Air Force - Postwar.

Serbia

- Serbian Air Force

United Kingdom

- Royal Flying Corps - One aircraft only.

United States

- American Expeditionary Force - One aircraft only, serving with 13th Aero Squadron.

Kingdom of Yugoslavia

- Yugoslav Royal Air Force - Postwar

== Specifications (S.XII) ==
Data from The Complete Book of Fighters

General characteristics

- Crew: 1
- Length: 6.4 m (21 ft 0 in)
- Wingspan: 8 m (26 ft 3 in)
- Height: 2.55 m (8 ft 4 in)
- Wing area: 20.2 m^{2} (217 sq ft)
- Empty weight: 587 kg (1,294 lb)
- Gross weight: 883 kg (1,947 lb)
- Powerplant: 1 × Hispano-Suiza 8Cb V-8 water-cooled piston engine, 164 kW (220 hp)
- Propellers: 2-bladed fixed-pitch propeller

Performance

- Maximum speed: 203 km/h (126 mph, 110 kn)
- Endurance: 1 hour 45 minutes
- Service ceiling: 6,850 m (22,470 ft)
- Time to altitude: 2,000 m (6,600 ft) 6 minutes 3 seconds

Armament

- Guns: 1 x 37 mm Puteaux single shot cannon, 1 x .303 in (7.7 mm) Vickers machine gun

== See also ==
Related development

- SPAD S.VII
- SPAD S.XI
- SPAD S.XIV
- De Bruyère C 1
