= Schneider Trophy =

Annual air racing event for seaplanes (1913–1931)

La Coupe d'Aviation Maritime Jacques Schneider
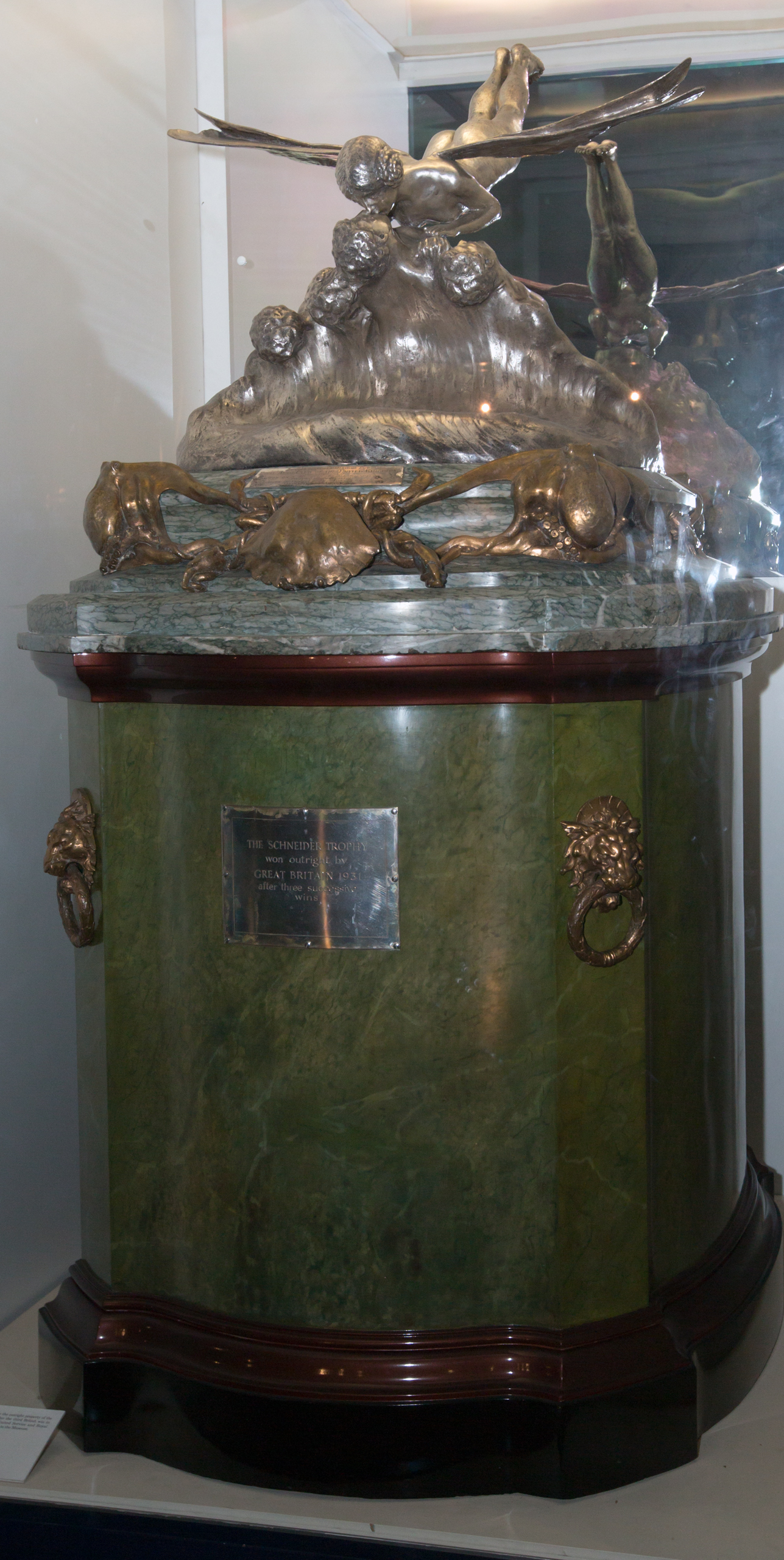
- The Schneider Trophy, on display at the Science Museum, London
- Awarded for: Fastest seaplane over a fixed course
- Sponsored by: Jacques Schneider
- Country: International
- First award: 1913
- Final award: 1931

The Coupe d'Aviation Maritime Jacques Schneider, also known as the Schneider Trophy, Schneider Prize or (incorrectly) the Schneider Cup is a trophy that was awarded first annually, and later biennially, to the winner of a race for seaplanes and flying boats. In 1931 Britain met the conditions to retain the Trophy permanently; it is on display at the Science Museum in South Kensington, London.

Announced in 1912 by Jacques Schneider, a French financier, balloonist and aircraft enthusiast, the competition offered a prize of approximately £1,000. The race was held twelve times between 1913 and 1931, the year when it was finally won permanently by the British. It was intended to encourage technical advances in civil aviation but became a contest for pure speed with laps over a (usually) triangular course, initially 280 km (170 mi) and later extended to 350 km (220 mi). The contests were staged as time trials, with aircraft setting off individually at set intervals, usually 15 minutes apart. The contests were very popular, and some of them attracted crowds of over 200,000 spectators.

The race was significant in advancing aeroplane design, particularly in the fields of aerodynamics and engine design, and showed its results in the best fighters of World War II. The streamlined shape and the low drag, liquid-cooled engine pioneered by Schneider Trophy designs are obvious in the British Supermarine Spitfire, the American North American P-51 Mustang, and the Italian Macchi C.202 Folgore.

An earlier 1910 trophy for land planes presented by Jacques Schneider, in France, the Grande Semaine d'Aviation de Tours, in the possession of the RAF College Cranwell, is also known as the Schneider Cup.

== Rules ==
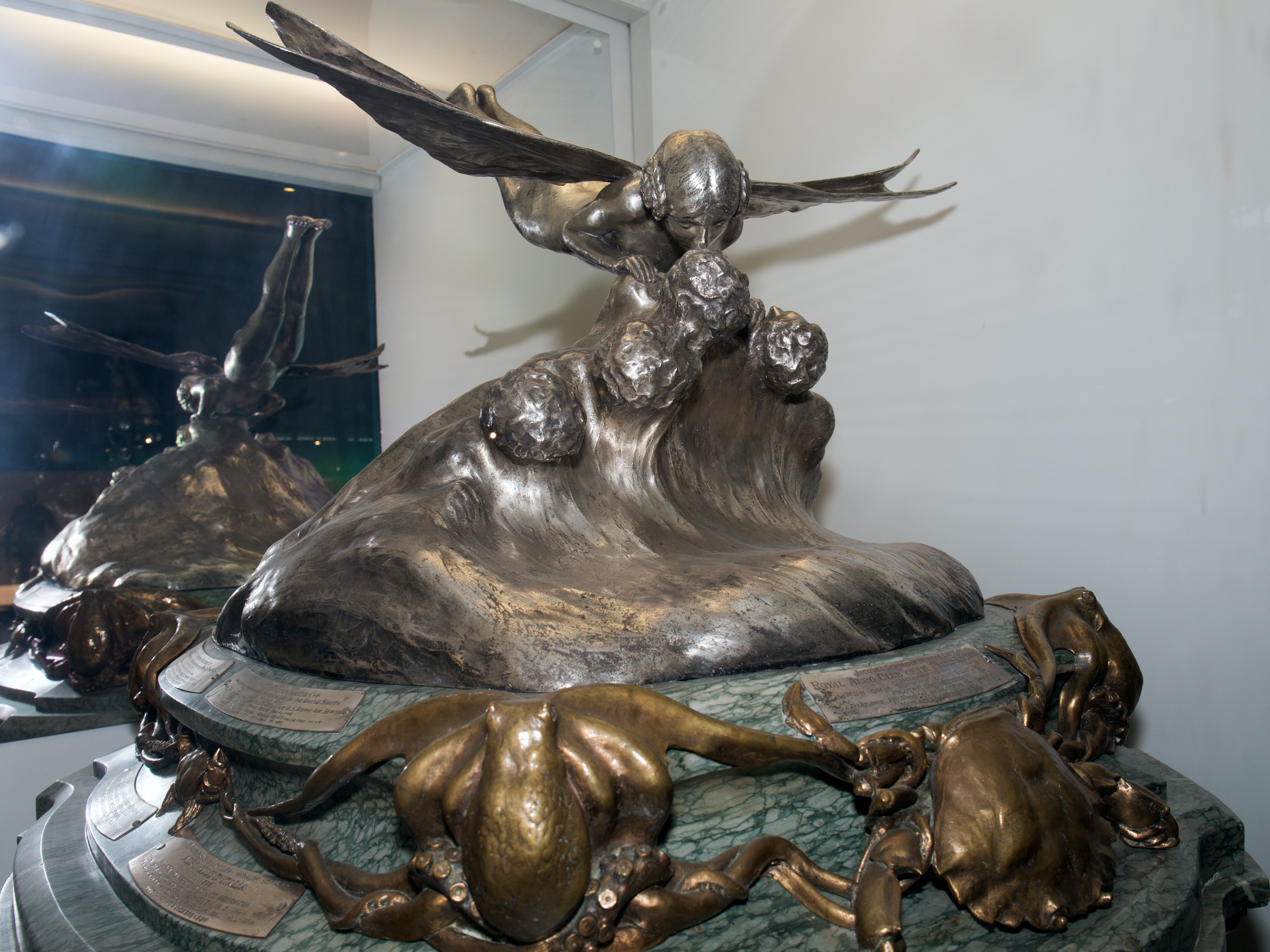
Close-up of the top of the Schneider Trophy (2013)

Aircraft taking part had to be seaworthy, having to float for six hours and travel about 550 yards (503m) on water. Twice during the flight they had to land on or "come in contact" with the water (which allowed contestants to carry out a fast bouncing manoeuvre). If the pontoons took on water, the flight had to continue with the added weight. Each competition was to be held in and managed by the country currently holding the trophy. If a country won three consecutive races, as the British finally did, they would retain the trophy permanently and the winning pilot would receive 75,000 French francs for each of the first three wins. The races were supervised by the Fédération Aéronautique Internationale and the aero club in the hosting country. Each club could enter up to three competitors with an equal number of alternatives.

== Trophy ==
The Schneider Trophy is a sculpture of silver and bronze set on a marble base. It depicts a zephyr skimming the waves, and a nude winged figure is seen kissing a zephyr recumbent on a breaking wave. The heads of two other zephyrs and of Neptune, the god of the Sea, can be seen surrounded by octopus and crabs. The symbolism represents speed conquering the elements of sea and air. The cost of the trophy was 25,000 francs.

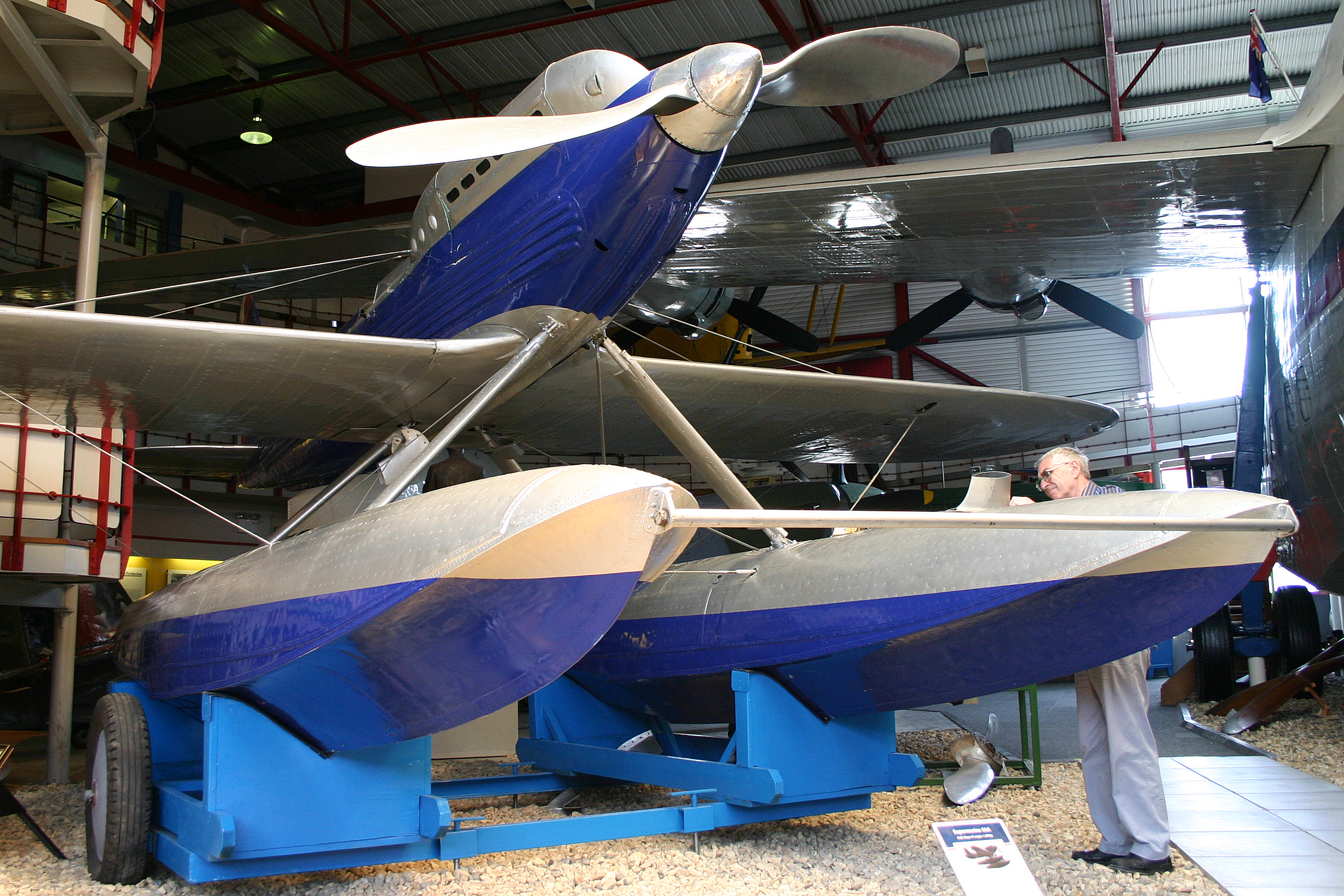
Supermarine S.6 N248 displayed at Solent Sky (2011). It was disqualified from the 1929 competition due to turning inside a marker.

After the British finally won permanent possession of the trophy in 1931, the sculpture was displayed for many years at the end of the corridor outside the ballroom of the Lansdowne Club. It has since been entrusted to the Royal Aero Club and can be viewed along with the winning Supermarine S.6B floatplane at the London Science Museum Flight exhibition hall. Supermarine S.6, N248, which competed in the 1929 contest but was disqualified, is preserved at Solent Sky maritime museum in Southampton.

== History ==
Schneider was a hydroplane racer who came from a wealthy family; his interest in aircraft began after he met Wilbur Wright in 1908, but a boating accident in 1910 crippled him and prematurely ended his racing and flying career. Schneider served as a race referee at the Monaco Hydroplane Meet in 1912, where he noted that seaplane development was lagging land-based aircraft; seeking to spur amphibious aircraft development, capable of reliable operation, extended range, and reasonable payload capacity, he announced the annual Schneider Trophy competition at a race banquet on 5 December, to cover a distance of at least 150 nautical miles (280 km; 170 mi).

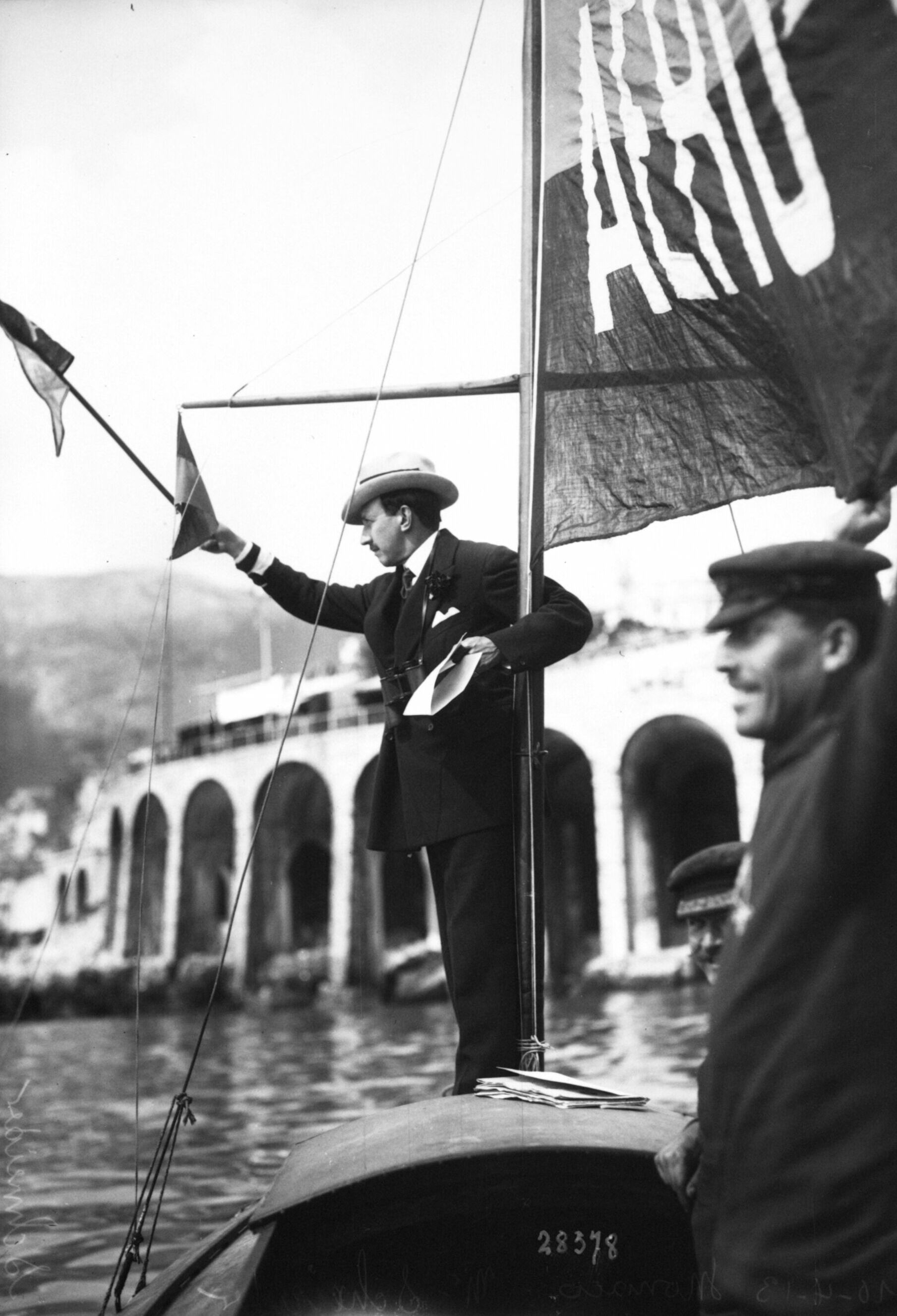
Jacques Schneider (1913)

The first competition was held on 16 April 1913, at Monaco, consisting of six laps, 300 kilometres (190 mi) distance in total. It was won by Maurice Prévost, piloting a French Deperdussin Monocoque (Coupe Schneider) at an average speed of 73.56 km/h (45.71 mph). Although Prévost had averaged a faster flying speed, he lost 50 minutes when he landed prematurely after losing count of the laps completed. All four entrants were flying French-made aircraft; two withdrew before completing the race. The British won in 1914 with a Sopwith Tabloid flown by Howard Pixton at 139.74 km/h (86.83 mph); the 1914 race was contested by three nations: France, the United Kingdom, and Switzerland. The United States and Germany failed to qualify. From 1915 to 1918, competition was suspended for the duration of World War I.

After the war, the competition resumed in 1919 at Bournemouth where in foggy conditions the Italian team won. They were later disqualified and the race was voided, as the referees ruled they had incorrectly flown around a marker buoy. In 1920 and 1921 at Venice the Italians won again; in 1920 no other nation entered and in 1921 the French entry did not start. Had it not been for the 1919 disqualification, Italy would have been awarded the trophy permanently. After 1921, an additional requirement was added: the winning seaplane had to remain moored to a buoy for six hours without human intervention.

In 1922 in Naples the British and French competed with the Italians. The British private entry, a Supermarine Sea Lion II, was the victor, flown by Henry Biard. The French aircraft did not start the race, which became a competition between the Sea Lion and three Italian aircraft, two Macchi M.17s and a Savoia S.51.

=== Nationalism ===
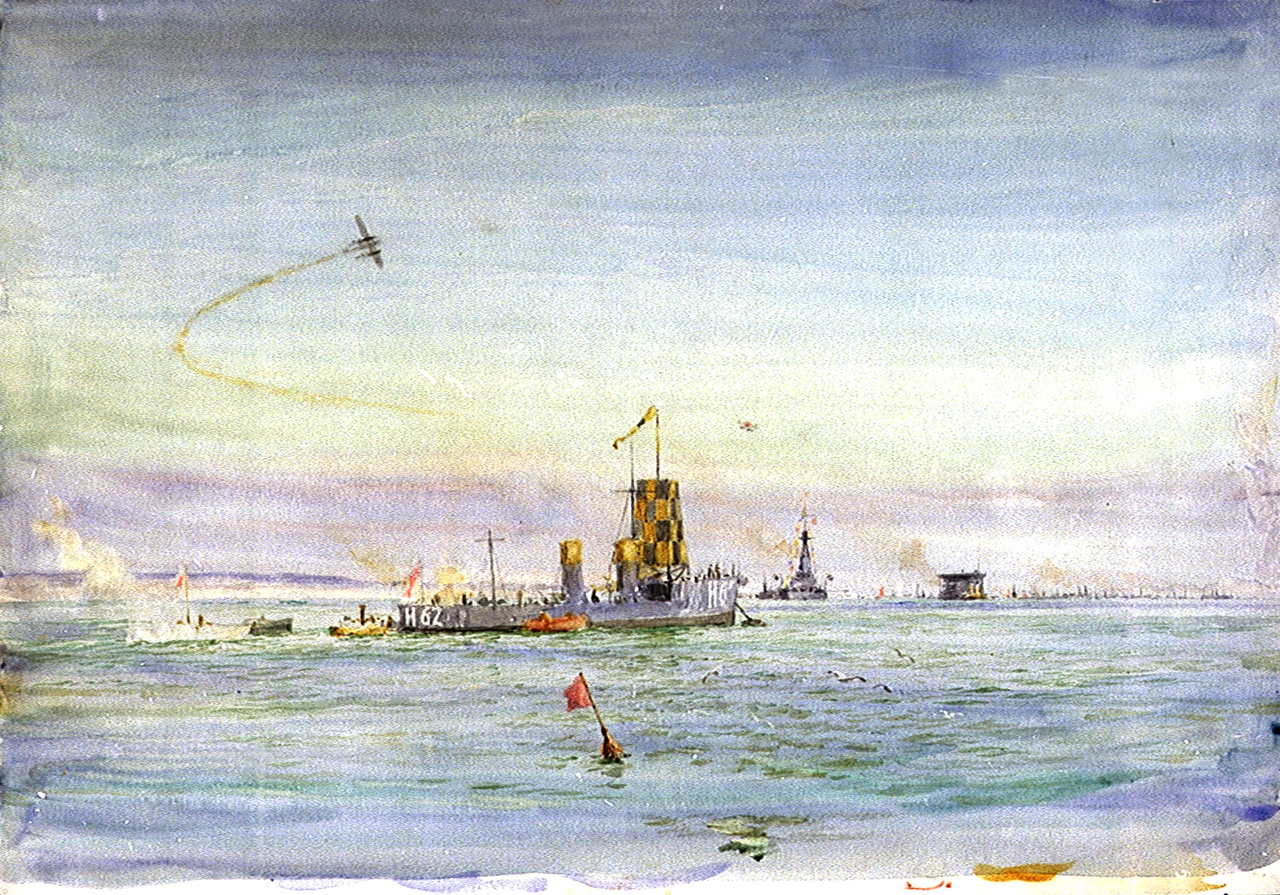
Schneider Cup racing, illustration by William Lionel Wyllie (c. 1920s)

The 1923 trophy, contested at Cowes, went to the Americans with a sleek, liquid-cooled engined craft designed by Glenn Curtiss. It used the Curtiss D-12 engine. U.S. Navy Lieutenant David Rittenhouse won the cup, and his teammate Rutledge Irvine was second in an identical aircraft. The British Sea Lion III (flown by 1922 winner Henry Biard), and the French entry withdrew from the race. The preparation of the United States team, backed by government support and using Curtiss racing biplanes derived from inter-military competitions, increased the speed and the investment of a winning entry significantly. In 1924 the competition was cancelled as no other nation turned out to face the Americans: the Italians and the French withdrew; and both British craft crashed in pre-race trials. In 1925 at Chesapeake Bay the Americans won again, with U.S. pilot Jimmy Doolittle winning in a Curtiss R3C ahead of the British Gloster III and the Italian Macchi M.33. R. J. Mitchell's Supermarine S.4 and the other Gloster III were damaged before the race and did not compete. Two of the American planes did not finish.

Benito Mussolini instructed the Italian aircraft industry to "win the Schneider Trophy at all costs" and so demonstrate the effectiveness of his Fascist government. In 1926, the Italians returned with a Macchi M.39 and won against the Americans with a 396.69 km/h (246.49 mph) run at Hampton Roads. The United States, short of funds, did not develop new aircraft for the 1926 title defence; the M.39, designed by Mario Castoldi, used a Fiat AS2 engine and was streamlined in the manner of the 1925 Supermarine and Curtiss entrants. The American teams withdrew from further competition after the 1926 race, as the military was unwilling to fund entrants. In 1927 at Venice the British responded by enlisting government backing and RAF pilots (the High Speed Flight) for the Supermarine, Gloster, and Shorts entries. Supermarine's Mitchell-designed S.5s took first and second places; no other entrants finished. The race was witnessed by an estimated 250,000 spectators. 1927 was the last annual competition, the event was then mutually agreed to be held biennially to allow more development time.

In 1929, at Calshot, Supermarine won again in the Supermarine S.6 with the new Rolls-Royce R engine with an average speed of 528.89 km/h (328.64 mph). Both Britain and Italy entered two new aircraft and a backup plane from the previous race. Three of the four new aircraft were disqualified (Supermarine S.6 N.248) or failed to finish the course (both Macchi M.67s), with the older Macchi M.52R taking second and Supermarine S.5 taking third. Although France had ordered racing seaplanes from Bernard and Nieuport-Delage in 1928, they were unable to complete them in time for the 1929 race.

=== The UK win ===
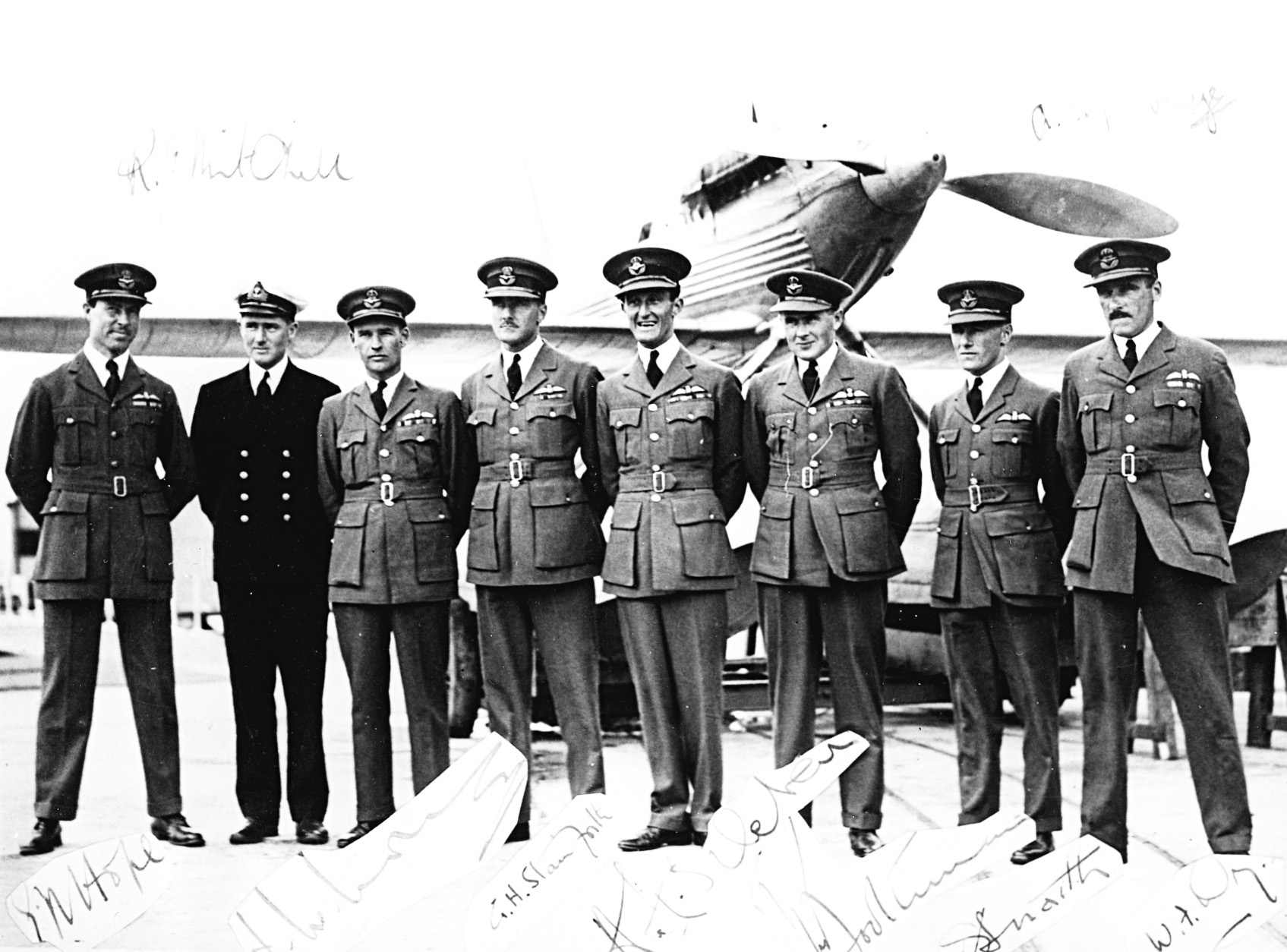
1931 Schneider Trophy team from the UK

In 1931 the British government withdrew support, but a private donation of £100,000 from the wealthy and ultra-patriotic Lucy, Lady Houston, allowed Supermarine to compete. When the French and Italian teams dropped out, leaving no other competitors, the British team flew the course alone on 13 September and won the coveted Schneider Trophy outright, having beaten the time record from the 1929 competition. Reportedly half a million spectators lined the beachfronts. The Italian, French, and German entrants failed to ready their aircraft in time for the competition. The remaining British team set both a new world speed record of 610 km/h (380 mph) and won the trophy outright with a third straight win. The following days saw the winning Supermarine S.6B further break the world speed record twice, making it the first craft to break the 400 mph barrier on 29 September at an average speed of 655.8 km/h (407.5 mph).

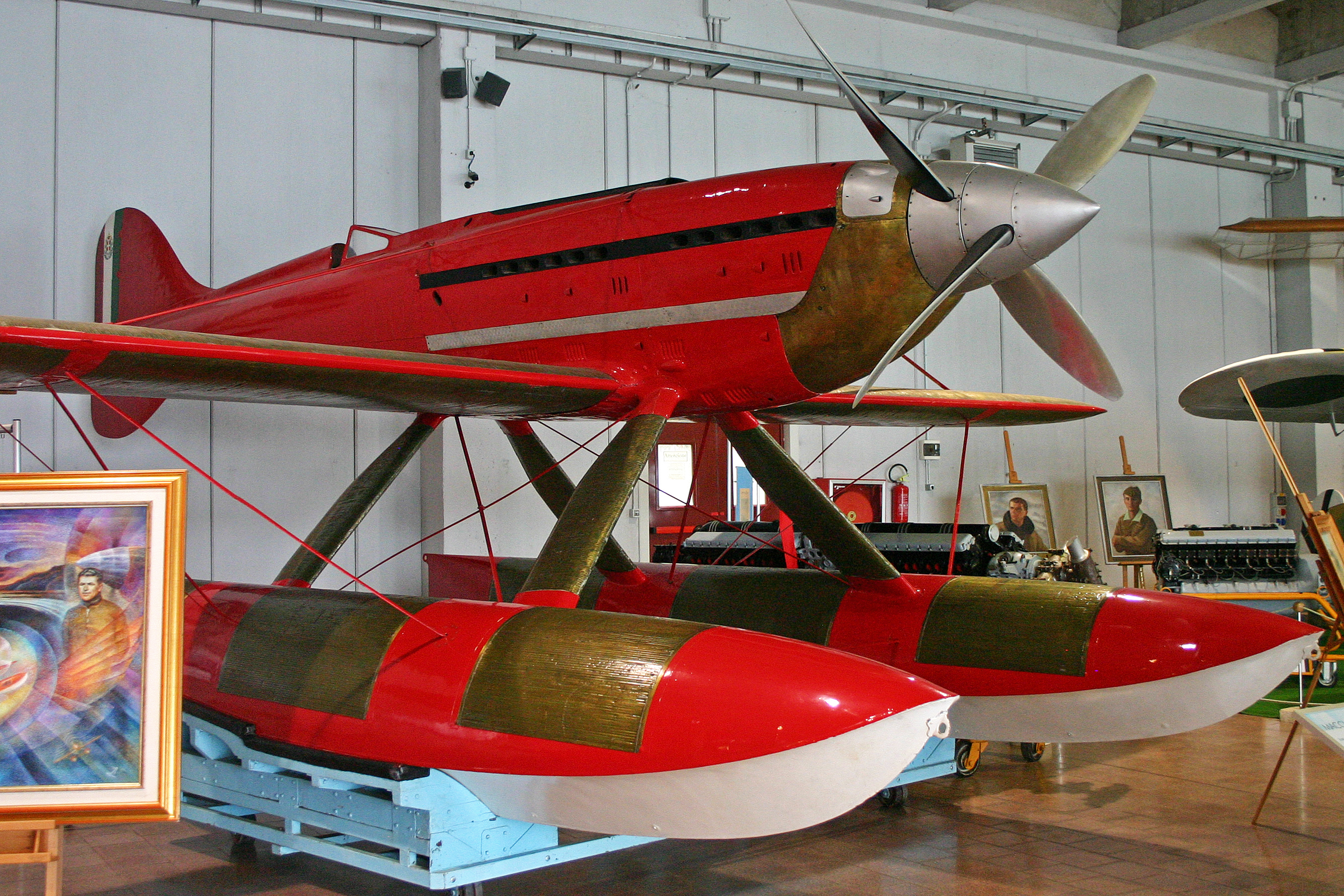
Macchi M.C.72 at Museo Vigna di Valle (2011)

Although the British team had secured the trophy for the UK permanently with the 1931 uncontested win, the development of the other 1931 entrants continued. The proposed Italian entrant (the Macchi M.C.72), which had pulled out of the contest due to engine problems, later went on to set two new world speed records with the help of British fuel expert Rod Banks, who had worked on the Rolls Royce R engine of the S6B. In April 1933 it set a record over Lake Garda in northern Italy with a speed of 682.36 km/h (424.00 mph). Eighteen months later in the same venue, it broke the 700 km/h barrier with an average speed of 709.202 km/h (440.678 mph). Both times the plane was piloted by Francesco Agello. This speed remains the fastest speed ever attained by a piston-engined seaplane.

For a complete list of the aircraft which competed in the competitions, see List of Schneider Trophy aircraft.

=== Winners ===
Date	Location	Winning aircraft	Image	Nation	Pilot	Average speed
1913	Monaco	Deperdussin Coupe Schneider		France	Maurice Prévost	73.56 km/h 45.71 mph
1914	Monaco	Sopwith Tabloid		United Kingdom	Howard Pixton	139.74 km/h 86.83 mph
1915–18	Competition suspended for World War I					
1919	Bournemouth, United Kingdom	Savoia S.13		Italy	Guido Janello	DQ
1920	Venice, Italy	Savoia S.12		Italy	Luigi Bologna	172.6 km/h 107.2 mph
1921	Venice, Italy	Macchi M.7bis		Italy	Giovanni de Briganti	189.66 km/h 117.85 mph
1922	Naples, Italy	Supermarine Sea Lion II		United Kingdom	Henry Biard	234.51 km/h 145.72 mph
1923	Cowes, United Kingdom	Curtiss CR-3		United States	David Rittenhouse	285.29 km/h 177.27 mph
1924	Competition cancelled					
1925	Baltimore, United States	Curtiss R3C-2		United States	James Doolittle	374.28 km/h 232.57 mph
1926	Hampton Roads, United States	Macchi M.39		Italy	Mario de Bernardi	396.69 km/h 246.49 mph
1927	Venice, Italy	Supermarine S.5		United Kingdom	Sidney Webster	453.28 km/h 281.66 mph
1929	Calshot Spit, United Kingdom	Supermarine S.6		United Kingdom	Richard Waghorn	528.89 km/h 328.64 mph
1931	Calshot Spit, United Kingdom	Supermarine S.6B		United Kingdom	John Boothman	547.31 km/h 340.08 mph

=== Alumni ===
- Reginald J. Mitchell, designer of the winning Supermarine Schneider Trophy entrants, also designed the Supermarine Spitfire fighter.
- Mario Castoldi, designer of the 1926 winner, the Macchi M.39, also designed other contestants such as the M.52, the M.52R, the M.67, and the M.C.72. After the M.C.72 Castoldi designed some of the Italian fighters which flew during World War II, such as the MC.202.
- James Doolittle, winning pilot of the 1925 race, was accomplished in many other areas. He led the famous "Doolittle Raid", an American bombing attack on several Japanese homeland targets in April 1942.

== In popular culture ==
- The Schneider Cup is frequently referred to in the 1992 animated film Porco Rosso, even to the extent of director Hayao Miyazaki's naming the film's antagonist Donald Curtiss, a reference to American aircraft designers Glenn Curtiss and Donald Douglas.
- In the song "Bill Hosie" by Archie Fisher, the protagonist rebuilds a Supermarine S.5 seaplane that survived the 1927 Schneider Trophy Race. The plane, race, and trophy are referred to throughout the song. (Bill Hosie and the replica were both real. Hosie competed in the 1985 and 1986 DEC Schneider Trophy Races, and DEC partly financed his rebuild of the S.5 replica. He crashed during a test-flight of this replica on 23 May 1987, near Mylor, Cornwall in the UK, just one month before that year's DEC Schneider Trophy Race. Hosie was killed. Details of the crash and its cause are in AIB Bulletin 9/87 published by the Accidents Investigation Branch of the UK's Department of Transport, 1987.)
- The film The First of the Few (1942) starring Leslie Howard as R. J. Mitchell centres on Mitchell's life as the designer of multiple Schneider Trophy–winning seaplanes and then the Spitfire fighter plane.

== See also ==
- List of aviation awards
- Gordon Bennett Trophy (aeroplanes)
- National Air Races
