= Deperdussin T =

1910s French reconnaissance aircraft

General information
- Type: Observation monoplane
- National origin: France
- Manufacturer: Société Pour les Appareils Deperdussin
- Primary user: French Air Force

History
- Introduction date: 1912

The Deperdussin T was a French monoplane built by Société Pour les Appareils Deperdussin, (later to become S.P.A.D.).

== Specifications (T) ==
Data from

General characteristics

- Crew: 1
- Length: 8.3 m (27 ft 3 in)
- Wingspan: 10.63 m (34 ft 11 in)
- Height: 2.70 m (8 ft 10 in)
- Wing area: 28.0 m^{2} (301 sq ft)
- Empty weight: 350 kg (772 lb)
- Gross weight: 450 kg (992 lb)
- Powerplant: 1 × Gnome 7 Gamma 7-cylinder air-cooled rotary piston engine, 52 kW (70 hp)
- Propellers: 2-bladed fixed-pitch propeller

Performance

- Maximum speed: 115 km/h (71 mph, 62 kn)
- Endurance: 2 hours 20 minutes
- Service ceiling: 2,000 m (6,600 ft)
