= SPAD S.XIV =

French WW1 fighter aircraft

XIV
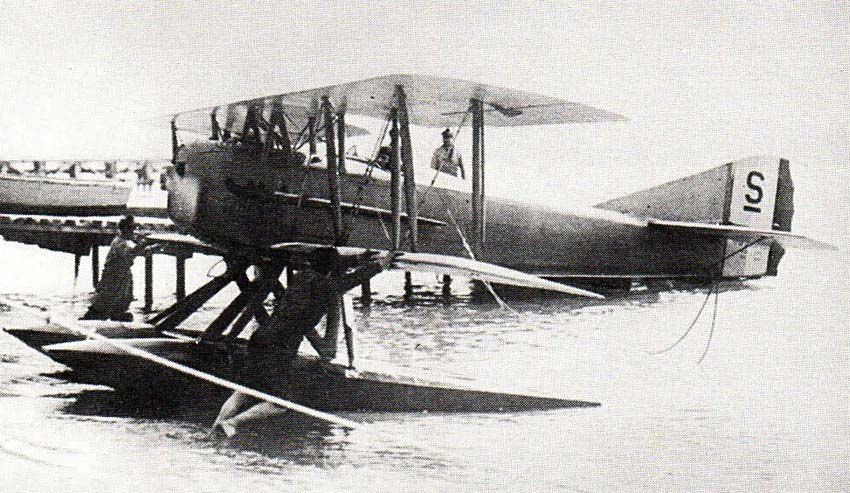

General information
- Type: seaplane fighter
- National origin: France
- Manufacturer: SPAD
- Number built: 40

History
- Introduction date: 1918
- First flight: 15 November 1917
- Developed from: SPAD XII

The SPAD XIV was a French biplane floatplane fighter aircraft built by Société Pour L'Aviation et ses Dérivés (SPAD) and flown by the French Navy during World War I.

== Development and design ==
The SPAD XIV was a development of the SPAD XII. It was single-seat biplane powered by a 149 kW (200 hp) Hispano-Suiza 8Bc engine. 40 were constructed and flew in the French Navy during 1918.

== Operators ==
France

- Aeronavale

== Specifications ==
Data from aviafrance.com

General characteristics

- Crew: 1
- Length: 7.40 m (24 ft 3 in)
- Wingspan: 9.80 m (32 ft 1.75 in)
- Height: 4.00 m (13 ft 5.5 in)
- Wing area: 26.20 m^{2} (282.0 sq ft)
- Empty weight: 770 kg (1,697 lb)
- Gross weight: 1,060 kg (2,336 lb)
- Powerplant: 1 × Hispano-Suiza 8BeC , 149 kW (220 hp)

Performance

- Maximum speed: 205 km/h (127.3 mph, 110.6 kn)
- Range: 249.4 km (155 mi, 135 nmi)
- Service ceiling: 4,998.7 m (16,400 ft)

Armament

- 1 x 7.70 mm (0.303 in) synchronised Vickers machine gun
- 1 x 37 mm (1.46 in) S.A.M.C. cannon
