= Jacques Schneider =

French financier, balloonist and aircraft enthusiast

Jacques P. Schneider
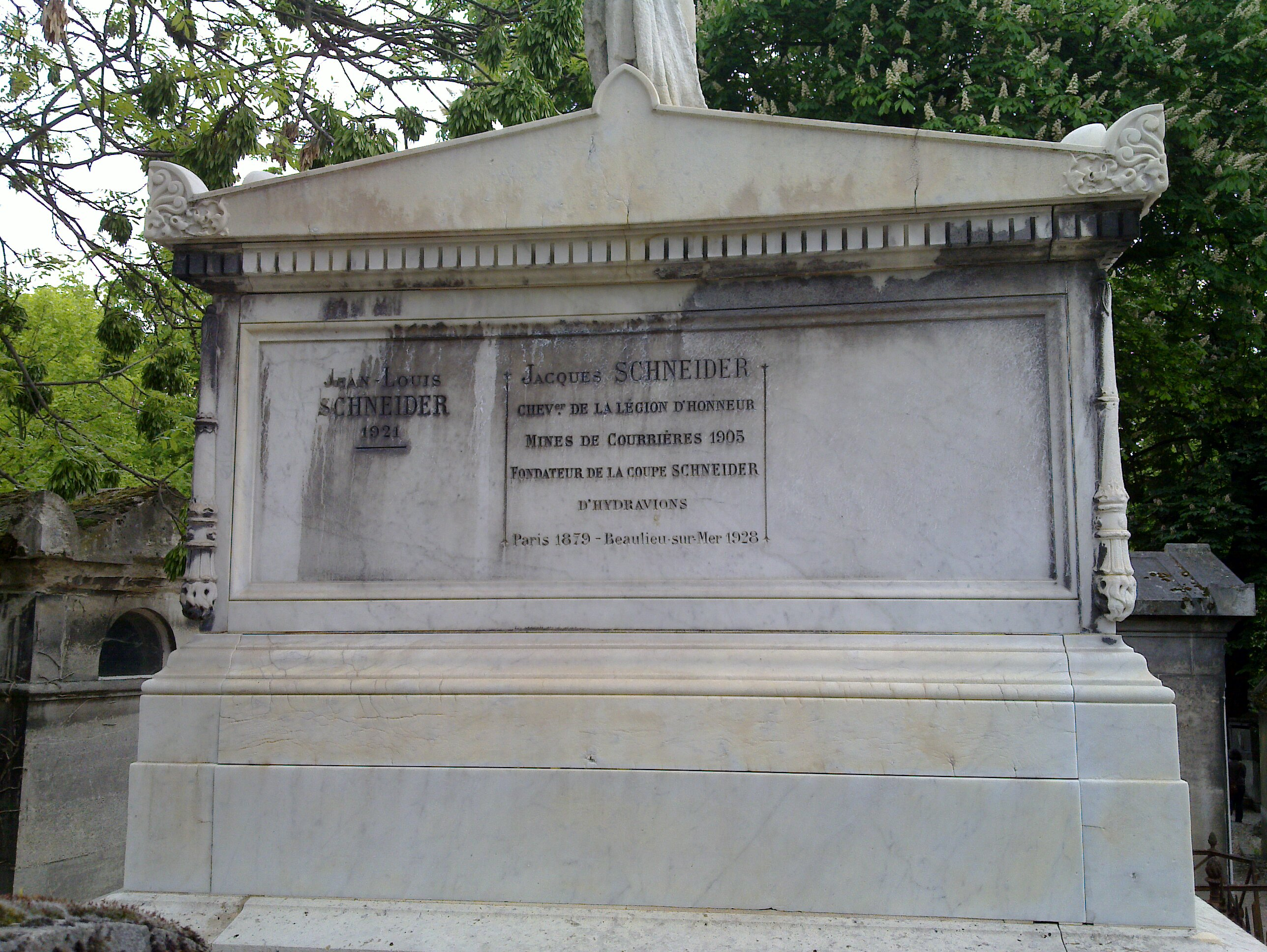
- Schneider's grave
- Born: 25 July 1879; Paris, France
- Died: 1 May 1928 (aged 48); Beaulieu-sur-Mer, France
- Occupations: French financier, balloonist
- Known for: Schneider Trophy

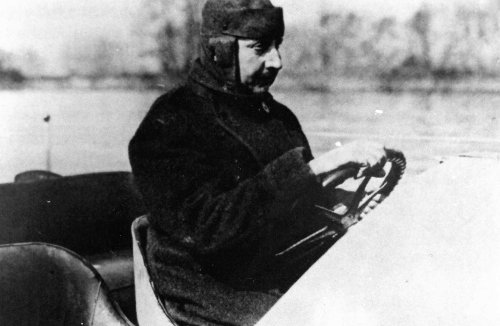
Jacques Schneider at the wheel of a racing car or one of his airboats

Jacques P. Schneider (25 July 1879 – 1 May 1928) was a French financier, balloonist and aircraft enthusiast, who created the Schneider Trophy.

== Life ==
Jacques P. Schneider was born near Paris on 25 July 1879. His father was Paul Henry Schneider (1841–1916), and his grandfather was Adolphe Schneider (1802–1845), founder of Société Schneider et Cie. Jacques Schneider was trained as an engineer at the Ecole des Mines.

He married Françoise Bourlon de Rouvre (1885–1931), daughter of Charles Bourlon de Rouvre. They had two daughters: Monique (1908–1995), who married her cousin Étienne de Ganay (1899–1990), and Louise-Charlotte (14 July 1912 – 29 May 2012), co-founder of the Maison d'Ananie. Étienne et Monique de Ganay were part of the expedition of La Korrigane in 1934–36.

Schneider had a taste for adventure, and took in turn to racing hydroplane boats, ballooning and piloting early airplanes. He became a balloon pilot with the Aéro-Club de France in 1908. He set a high altitude record in ballooning, at 10,081 metres (33,074 ft). His interest in engine powered heavier-than-air flights started when he saw Wilbur Wright performing a flight demonstration in Le Mans in August 1908. In 1911 he was given airplane pilot certificate number 409. At this time airplanes were lightly built of wood and canvas, and easily damaged. Forced to abandon flying after a severe accident, he became a constant financial supporter of various flight contests.

Jacques Schneider was made a Knight of the Legion of Honor. Reduced to poverty, he died on 1 May 1928 at Beaulieu-sur-Mer on the French Riviera.

== Schneider Trophy ==
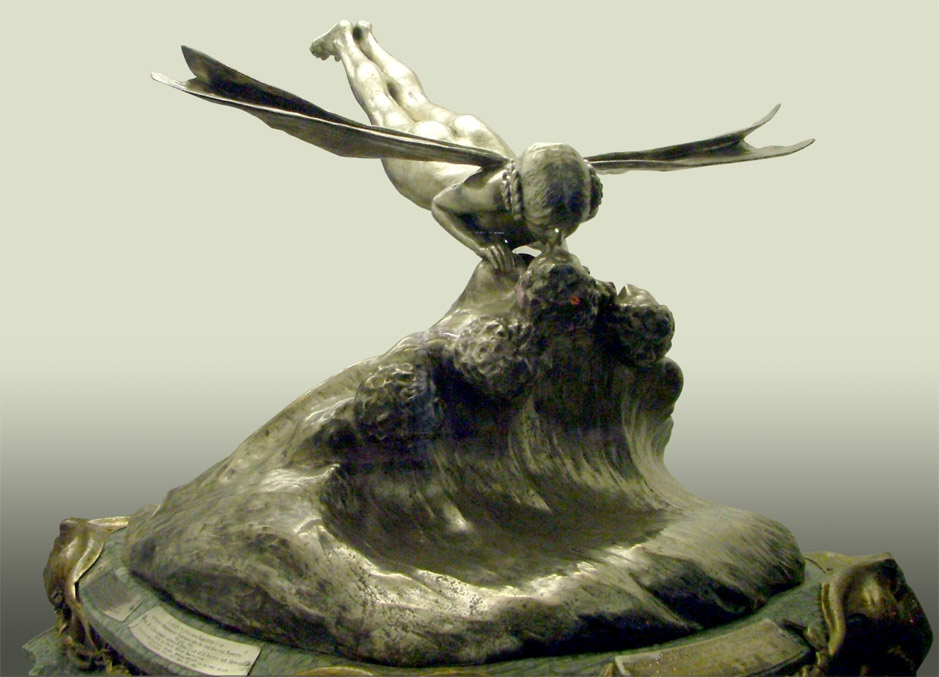
Schneider Trophy

Schneider thought that seaplanes had a great future since so much of the Earth is covered by water, which could be used for takeoff by large, heavy aircraft without the need to build runways. On 5 December 1912, at the Aéro-Club de France he proposed an annual contest for seaplanes, the "Coupe d'Aviation Maritime Jacques Schneider" (Schneider Trophy), to support the technical progress of civil aviation. Participants had to fly a distance of at least 150 miles (240 km). The reward for the winner was 25,000 gold francs and a cup worth the same as the prize. If a nation won the trophy three times within five years, the cup would belong to them.

The first Schneider Trophy competition was held in 1913 in the Mediterranean off Monaco and another competition was held the next year. The competition was suspended during World War I, then resumed in 1919. Nine more races were held until the competition was permanently suspended in 1931. The races did not achieve Schneider's objective of furthering commercial aviation by developing robust long-range airplanes. Instead, they became an object of intense national competition, with designs built only to win the trophy and of little use for other purposes. The race did however prove important for the innovation of military aircraft and liquid cooled engines.
