= SPAD S.A =

French WW1 fighter aircraft

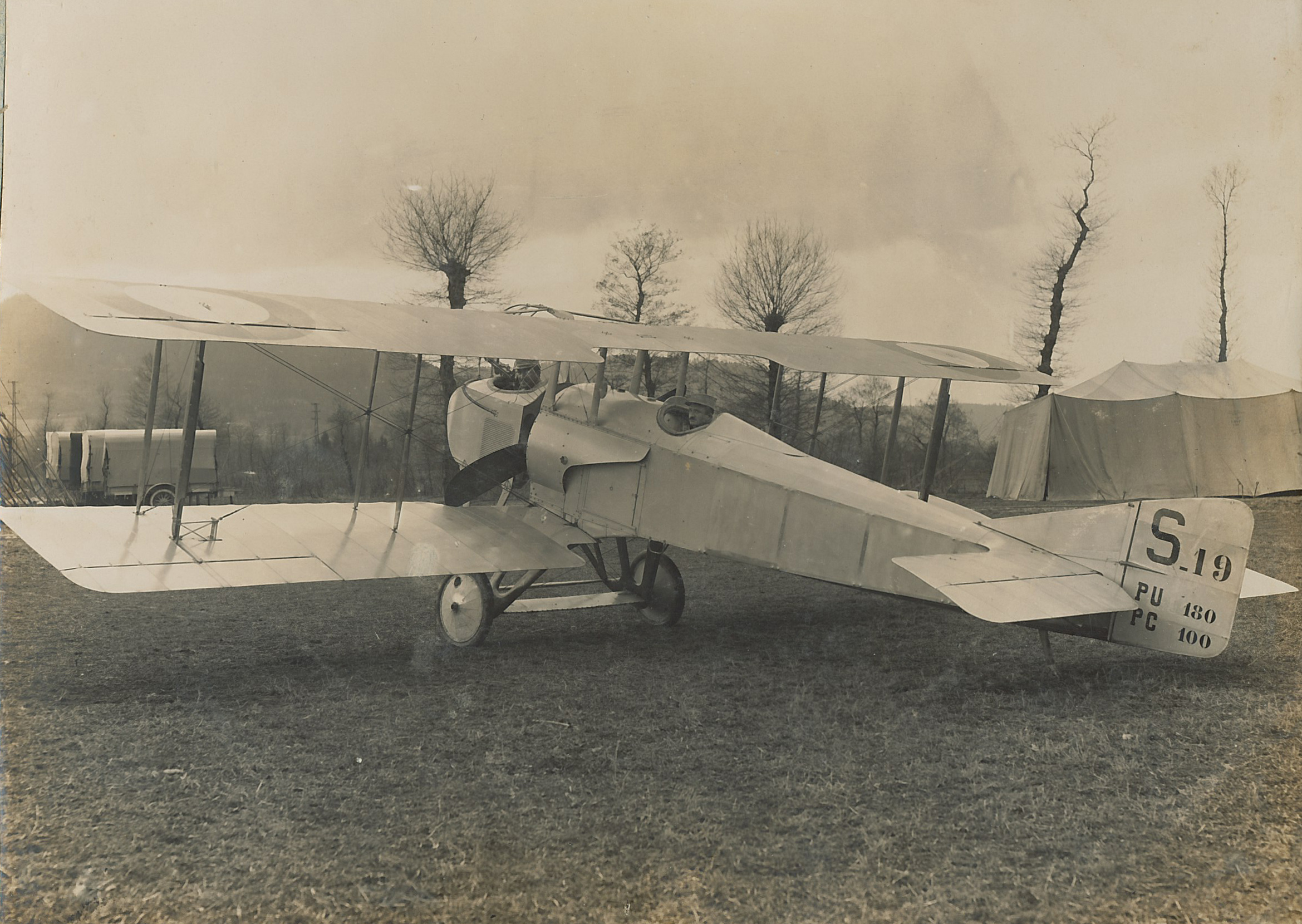
- French SPAD S.A-2 of Escadrille N49 in Corzieux.

General information
- Type: Fighter
- Manufacturer: Société Pour l'Aviation et ses Dérivés (SPAD)
- Designer: Louis Béchereau
- Status: retired
- Primary users: Russian Empire France
- Number built: 107

History
- Manufactured: 1915–1916
- Introduction date: 1915
- First flight: 1915
- Variant: SPAD S.G

The SPAD S.A (also called S.A.L.) was a French two-seat tractor biplane first flown in 1915. It was used by France and Russia in the early stages of the First World War in the fighter and reconnaissance roles. It was a unique aircraft that carried its observer in a nacelle ahead of wing, engine and propeller.

== Design and development ==
The SPAD A.1 prototype was the first aircraft produced by SPAD following its reorganization from the pre-war Deperdussin company. The chief designer, Louis Béchereau, had been involved in designing that firm's successful monocoque racing monoplanes, and many design details were carried over from the Deperdussins.

The aircraft was designed to carry not only its pilot in the normal position, but also an observer in a streamlined nacelle ahead of the propeller. This configuration was an attempt to combine the advantages of the tractor and the pusher types, giving the observer a clear field of view to the front and sides without the drag penalty of the typical pusher. However, communication between the pilot and the observer was nearly impossible. The pulpit (as it was known in English) or basket (as it was referred to in Russian) vibrated badly and, in multiple cases, parted company from the rest of the aircraft while in flight. Like many pushers, it also put the observer at risk of being crushed in even a relatively mild crash or "nose-over". A British evaluation of the type suggested "it would be expensive in observers if flown by indifferent pilots".

While not originally designed explicitly as a gunner's position, early combat experience had shown a need for forward-firing machine guns. But mechanisms to allow a gun to fire through the propeller were not yet available, and the observer's nacelle on the S.A-1 represented a temporary solution.

As well as the 2-seat S.A versions a single seat fighter, the SPAD S.G, was also produced with fixed forward-firing guns in the nose nacelle, without any occupant. The S.G.'s guns were not accessible to the pilot which caused problems when stoppages occurred and with cocking the guns for combat.

On all but the earliest prototypes and the SPAD S.G, the nacelle was fitted with a light machine gun on a flexible tubular mount, and it incorporated air intakes on its sides and underside to redirect air toward the Le Rhône rotary engine, which was otherwise masked by the nacelle. Starting the engine required the prop to be swung from alongside the fuselage. The nacelle was hinged at the bottom to provide some access to the engine for maintenance, but this was insufficient, and additional sliding panels were added to the sides of the fuselage. A mesh screen behind the observer was intended to prevent propeller strikes. The first prototypes were unarmed, but the production S.A was soon eclipsed by more conventional fighters, such as the Nieuport 10 and Nieuport 11.

Aside from the unorthodox configuration, the aircraft was of standard wood and fabric construction for the period. The wings had a single bay, but to prevent the long flying and landing wires from vibrating in flight, light vertical struts were added mid-bay to brace the wires, giving the aircraft the appearance of a two-bay biplane, much as was done for the later, more conventional SPAD S.VII and SPAD S.XIII single-seat fighters.

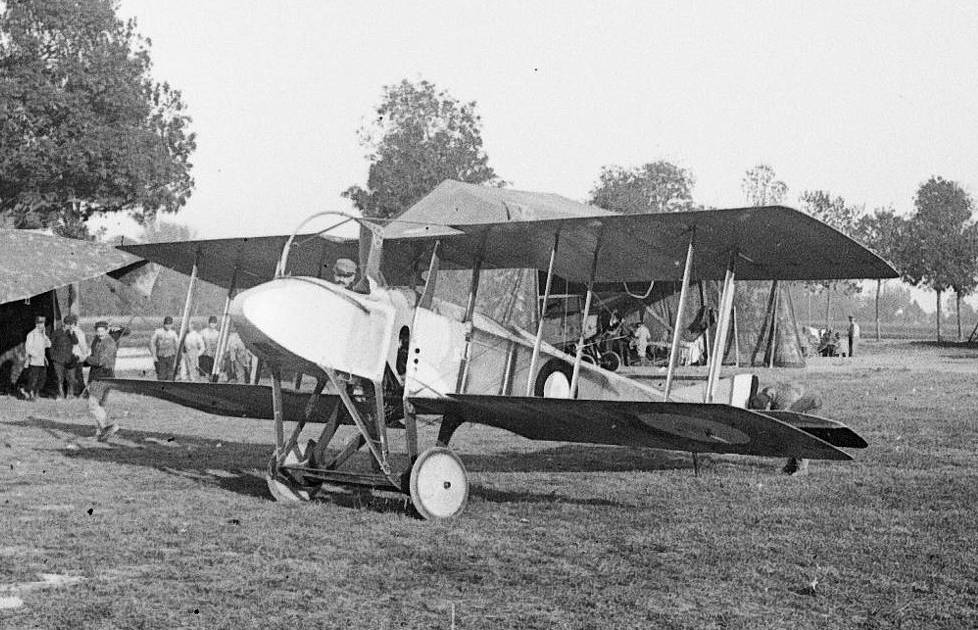
SPAD S.A-2 at Somme-Vesle in 1915

The SPAD S.A.2 was an improved version of the S.A.1 which first flew on 21 May 1915.

The S.A-2's 110 hp engine frequently suffered from overheating, so the design reverted to the S.A-1s 80 hp Le Rhone in the S.A-4, with the same engine being retrofitted to some S.A-2s. Other changes included dispensing with the lower ailerons on the narrower chord lower wings and a larger tailplane to eliminate the need for a bungee to help with trimming. Russian models had minor structural differences to the top wing, incorporating a separate center section rather than each wing panel being joined along the centerline.

In spite of its lack of success, the design brought valuable experience to Béchereau and his team. The successful S.VII fighter was a direct development of the A series. It had much in common. However, the differences included the pulpit being dispensed with, being re-engined with a Hispano-Suiza V8, having a delta-shaped tailplane, the fuselage being fitted with additional fairing stringers, wire trailing edges, reduced rib spacing, and proportions adjusted slightly. Most other design details were retained.

== Operational history ==
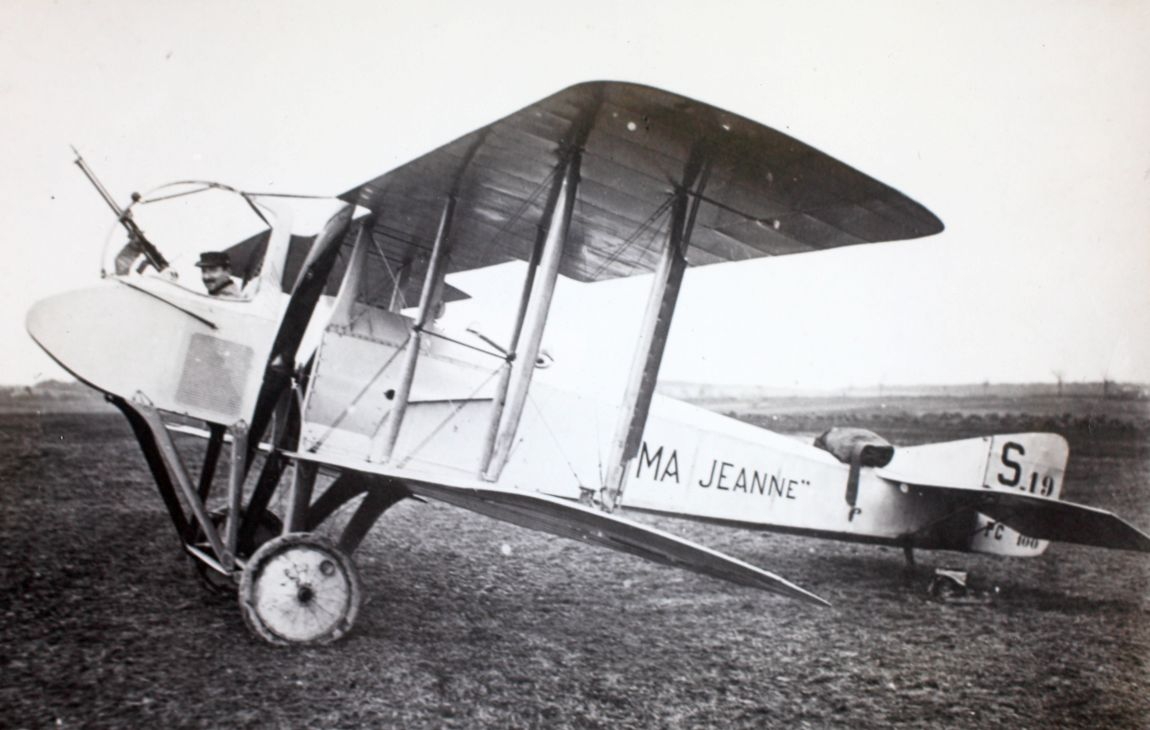
SPAD S.A-2 "Ma Jeanne"

The S.A had a short and inauspicious career in the French Aviation Militaire, and it was quickly replaced in service by less dangerous aircraft. Contemporary sources indicate that it was seldom used. Few details are available concerning the careers of the 42 S.A-2 airframes delivered, and it never supplied the entire equipment of an escadrille.

The Imperial Russian Air Service operated the SPAD S.A-2 and S.A-4 for a longer period of time due to a shortage of available aircraft. Some 57 S.A-2s and S.A-4s went to the Imperial Russian Air Service. During winter operations, Russian aircraft were fitted with skis instead of wheels. Although Russian crews also thought very little of the SPAD (not made any better by the acronym SPAD (СПАД) in Russian meaning "slump" or "plummet"), at least two crews achieved successes with it.

On November 25, 1916, Russian pilot Karpov and his gunner, Bratolyubov Jurij Aleksandrovich, claimed a German aircraft near the village of Vulka.

At least one example survived to be used briefly by the Soviet Union before they retired all obsolete types.

== Variants ==
- SPAD S.A-1 – initial production variant with 80 hp Le Rhône 9C engine and tapered tailplane – 11 built.
- SPAD S.A-2 – main production variant with constant chord tailplane and 110 hp Le Rhône 9J. – 35 built
- SPAD S.A-3 – dual-control trainer, with both pilot and observer being given flexible gun mounts – two built with 110 hp Le Rhône 9J.
- SPAD S.A-4 – an improved A.2 with a less powerful 80-hp Le Rhône 9C engine. – 59 built.
- SPAD S.D – slightly larger aircraft with an additional gunner position behind pilot, powered by a 220-hp Renault 8Fg engine – one built
- SPAD S.G – S.A with observer replaced by guns mounted in the nacelle – one built and one modified.
- SPAD S.H – unbuilt development without pulpit, precursor to SPAD S.V (5), which was SPAD S.VII prototype

== Operators ==
France

- French Air Force

Russian Empire

- Imperial Russian Air Service

Soviet Union
Workers' and Peasants' Air Fleet

== Specifications (S.A-2) ==
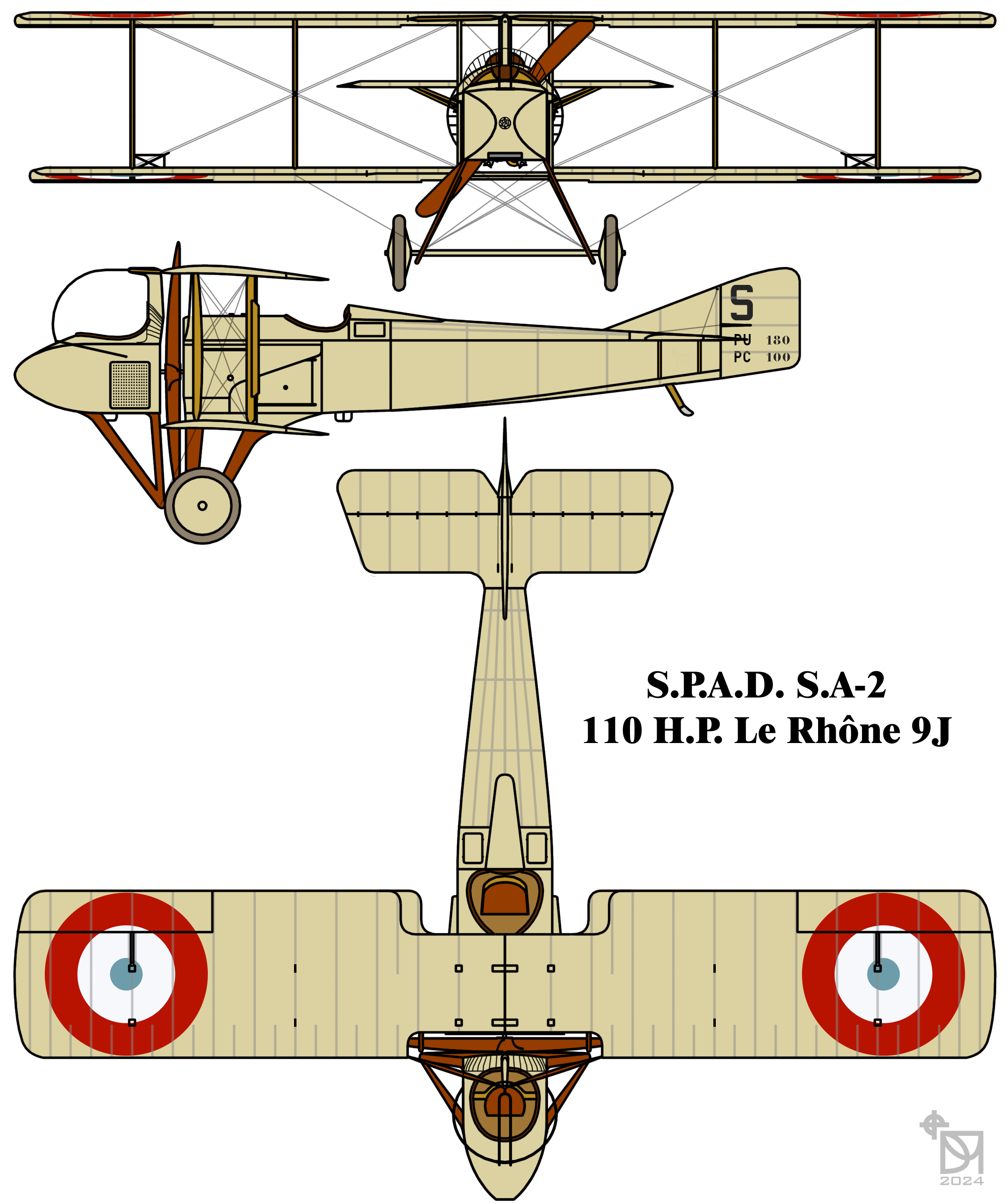
colour 3-view drawing of SPAD S.A.2 two-seat fighter

Data from French aircraft of the First World War, Aviafrance : SPAD S.A-2

General characteristics

- Crew: Two
- Length: 7.3 m (23 ft 11 in)
- Wingspan: 9.55 m (31 ft 4 in) some sources give 9.10 m (29.9 ft)
- Height: 2.6 m (8 ft 6 in)
- Wing area: 25.36 m^{2} (273.0 sq ft)
- Empty weight: 414 kg (913 lb)
- Gross weight: 674 kg (1,486 lb)
- Powerplant: 1 × Le Rhône 9J 9-cylinder air-cooled rotary piston engine, 82 kW (110 hp)
- Propellers: 2-bladed wooden fixed-pitch propeller

Performance

- Maximum speed: 140 km/h (87 mph, 76 kn) at sea level
- Endurance: 3 hours
- Time to altitude:

- 1,000 m (3,300 ft) in 6 minutes 30 seconds
- 2,000 m (6,600 ft) in 12 minutes 30 seconds
- 3,000 m (9,800 ft) in 23 minutes 30 seconds

Armament

- Guns: 1 x .303 in (7.7 mm) light aircraft machine gun – types used include Lewis, Colt, Hotchkiss and Madsen.

== See also ==
Related development

- Deperdussin Monocoque/Deperdussin TT
- SPAD S.VII

Aircraft of comparable role, configuration, and era

- Gallaudet D-4
- Royal Aircraft Factory B.E.9

== Bibliography ==
- Bruce, J.M. (1996). SPAD S.A-2/S.A-4. Windsock Mini Datafile 4. Hertfordshire, UK: Albatros Publications. ISBN 978-0948414824.
- Connors, John F. (1989). SPAD Fighters in action. Squadron/Signal.
- Cony, Christophe (January 1997). "L'histoire inconnue des SPAD type A (première partie)" [The Unknown History of Type A SPADs (Part One)]. Avions: Toute l'aéronautique et son histoire (in French) (46): 28–35. ISSN 1243-8650.
- Cony, Christophe (February 1997). "L'histoire inconnue des SPAD type A (deuxième partie)" [The Unknown History of Type A SPADs (Part Two)]. Avions: Toute l'aéronautique et son histoire (in French) (47): 28–33. ISSN 1243-8650.
- Cony, Christophe (April 1997). "L'histoire inconnue des SPAD type A (quatrième partie)" [The Unknown History of Type A SPADs (Part Four)]. Avions: Toute l'aéronautique et son histoire (in French) (49): 32–38. ISSN 1243-8650.
- Cony, Christophe & Kulikov, Victor (January 1999). "Du nouveau sur les SPAD-Nacelles" [Again on the SPAD-Nacelles]. Avions: Toute l'aéronautique et son histoire (in French) (70): 37–44. ISSN 1243-8650.
- Durkota, Alan; Darcey, Thomas; Kulikov, Victor (1995). The Imperial Russian Air Service: Famous Pilots and Aircraft of World War I. Mountain View, CA: Flying Machines Press. ISBN 0-9637110-2-4.
- Herris, Jack (2005). SPAD Two-seater Fighters Of World War I. Great War Aircraft in Profile 7. Mountain View, CA: Flying Machines Press. ISBN 978-1891268199.
- Somer, Ellic (February 1990). "Pulpit SPADs: A-series". WW1 Aero (127). WW1 Aeroplanes, Inc: 10–27.
- "SPAD S-A1". aviafrance.com. 17 September 1997.
- "SPAD S-A2". aviafrance.com. 22 April 1997.
- "SPAD S-A4". aviafrance.com. 22 April 1997.
- "SPAD S-G2". aviafrance.com. 25 September 1997.
