= De Bruyère C 1 =

de Bruyère C 1
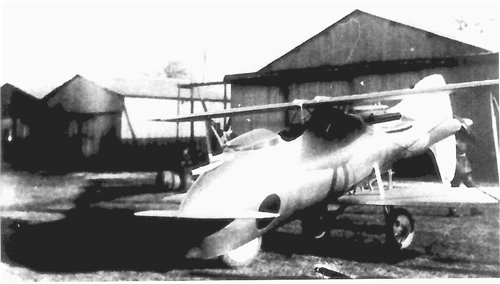

General information
- Type: Fighter
- National origin: France
- Designer: Marcel de Bruyère
- Number built: 1

History
- First flight: April 1917

The de Bruyère C 1 was a prototype French single seat pusher canard fighter of unusual design produced during World War I. The sole example built crashed on its first flight, and development terminated.

== Design and development ==
Developed by Marcel de Bruyère, the C 1 was a single-bay biplane with staggered equal-span wings and inverted V-struts. An all-moving one piece canard controlled pitch, while roll control was provided by unusual full chord tip ailerons on the upper wing.

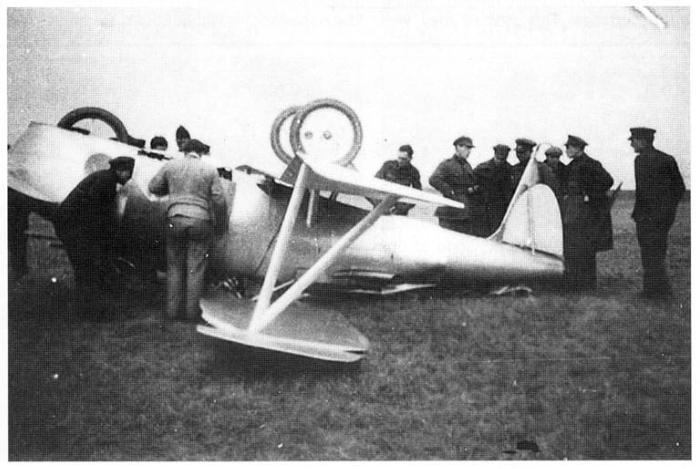
Crash of the C 1 prototype with rotary-tip aileron detail.

A 150 hp Hispano-Suiza 8Aa water-cooled engine located immediately aft of the wings drove a two-bladed pusher propeller mounted at the extreme tail, via a long shaft. Using a ventral fin with a long tail skid to protect the propeller and a short vertical stabilizer, the C 1 had no fixed horizontal stabilizer. Its tricycle landing gear and advanced metal fuselage were also unusual for its era. Designed to have an unrestricted forward field of fire, the fuselage also had two large circular windows on each side for downward visibility. Armament consisted of a single 37mm cannon.

Its first and only flight was made in April 1917 at flight test facilities used by Farman Aviation Works and Blériot Aéronautique in Étampes, France. The C 1 reached an altitude of roughly 25 feet before entering an uncontrolled roll before crashing inverted. The test pilot survived but no further development of the type was pursued.

== Specifications ==
Data from

General characteristics

- Crew: 1
- Length: 7.5 m (24 ft 7 in)
- Wingspan: 8.2 m (26 ft 11 in)
- Powerplant: 1 × Hispano-Suiza 8Aa V-8 water-cooled piston engine

Performance Armament

- Guns: 1x 37 mm (1.457 in) cannon

== See also ==
- SPAD S.XII
- Farman MF.11
- Farman F.40
