= SPAD S.G =

S.G

General information
- Type: single-seat fighter
- National origin: France
- Manufacturer: SPAD (Société Pour l'Aviation et ses Dérivés)
- Number built: 1 converted from the prototype SPAD S.A-1

History
- Developed from: SPAD S.A

The SPAD S.G1 and SPAD S.G2 were French single seat tractor biplanes of ca 1915/16, following similar arrangements to the SPAD S.A2 family with the propeller and engine buried in the fuselage and a pod suspended in front of the engine. A single SPAD S.A-1 was converted with a small circular section pulpit nacelle mounting a mock-up of a fixed forward-firing machine-gun and smaller wings.

At least one SPAD S.A-2 was converted to carry three fixed forward-firing machine-guns by the Imperial Russian Air Service in a similar fashion to the S.G.

== Specifications (S.G) ==
Data from French Aircraft of the First World War

General characteristics

- Crew: 1
- Wing area: 18.58 m^{2} (200.0 sq ft)
- Powerplant: 1 × Le Rhône 9J 9-cylinder air-cooled rotary piston engine, 82 kW (110 hp)
- Propellers: 2-bladed fixed-pitch propeller

Performance

- Maximum speed: 161 km/h (100 mph, 87 kn) at 2,000 m (6,600 ft)

154 km/h (96 mph; 83 kn) at 3,000 m (9,800 ft)

- Time to altitude: 2,000 m (6,600 ft) in 7 minutes 15 seconds

2,000 m (6,600 ft) in 11 minutes 30 seconds

Armament

- Guns: 1x fixed Hotchkiss M1909 Benét–Mercié machine gun with 1000 rounds
