= Société pour l'aviation et ses dérivés =

Aircraft manufacturer

- Industry: Aeronautics
- Founded: 1911
- Founder: Armand Deperdussin
- Defunct: 1921
- Fate: Acquired by Blériot Aeronautique. Brand retired in 1921.

SPAD (Société Pour L'Aviation et ses Dérivés) was a French aircraft manufacturer active between 1911 and 1921. Its SPAD S.XIII biplane was the most produced French fighter airplane of the First World War.

== Deperdussin ==
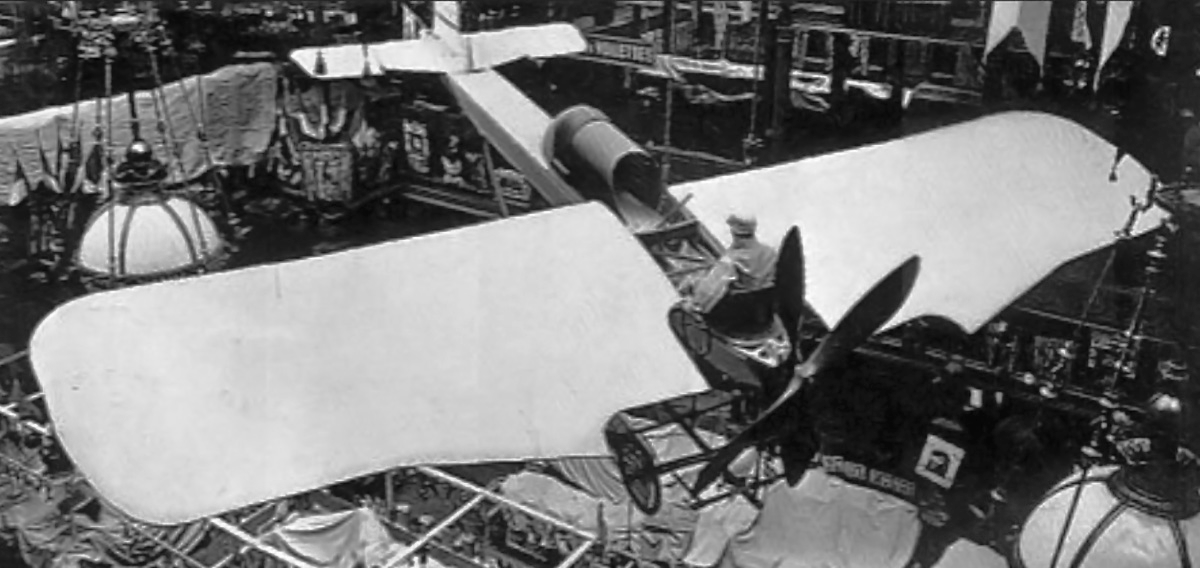
The first Deperdussin aircraft - a canard.

The company was set up in 1911 as Aéroplanes Deperdussin, becoming the Société de Production des Aéroplanes Deperdussin in 1912. Its founder Armand Deperdussin (born 1867) had been a travelling salesman and a cabaret singer in Liège and Brussels, before making his fortune in the silk business. Deperdussin became fascinated by aviation in 1908, and in 1909 he established an aircraft works at Laon. Deperdussin himself was not a designer, but he hired the engineer Louis Béchereau (1880–1970) as technical director. Béchereau was responsible for Deperdussin and SPAD aircraft designs thereafter.

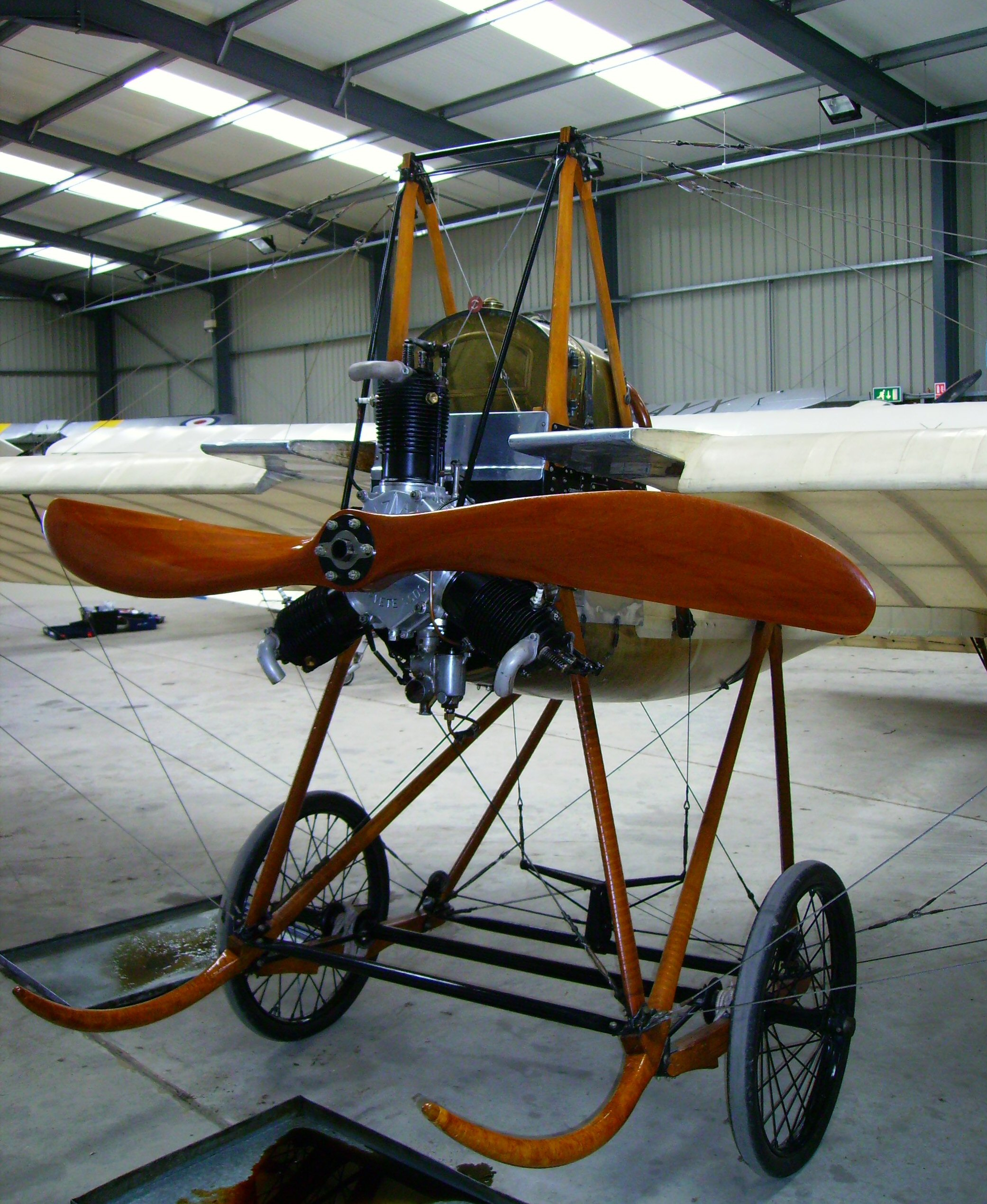
Original Typea A Deperdussin monoplane from the Shuttleworth Collection

The first Deperdussin aircraft was an unsuccessful canard, but their next aircraft, the Type A, was an immediate success, and led to a series of closely related monoplanes. Similar to the Nieuport IV and Morane-Saulnier G, this was a popular layout before the First World War. The Deperdussin TT was a considerable export success, and 63 were built by the Lebedev company in Russia and others at Highgate in London by the British Deperdussin Company. From 1911 onward Deperdussin produced aircraft at a new factory at Grenelle, in the suburbs of Paris.

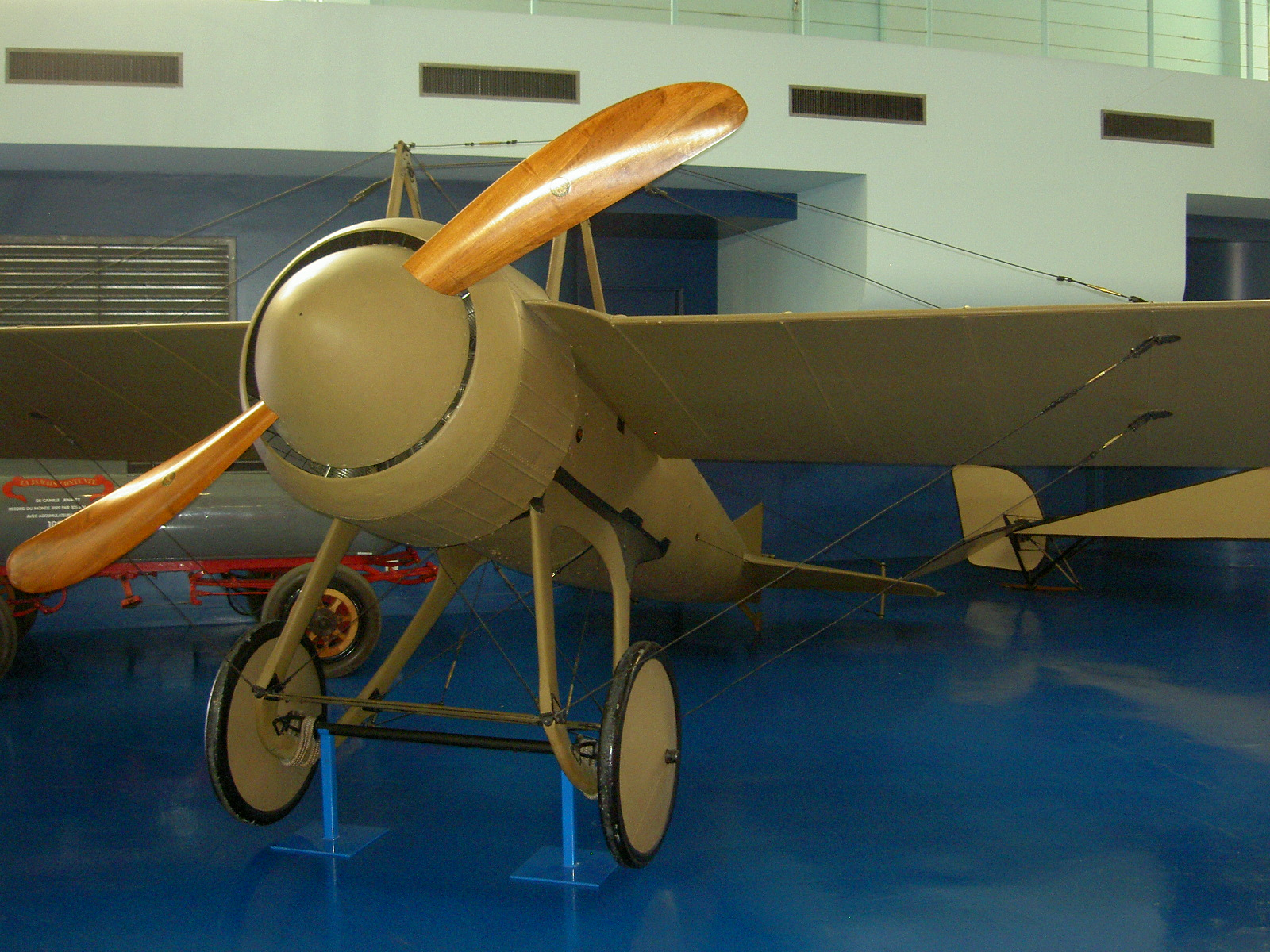
Deperdussin Monocoque at the Musée de l'Air et de l'Espace.

Factories were also established at Le Havre and Juvisy to build motor boats and waterplanes, as well as three flying schools.

The company also produced a number of notable racing aircraft, including the groundbreaking Deperdussin Monocoque, which won the 1912 and 1913 Gordon Bennett Trophy races, set several world speed records and was the first airplane to exceed 200 km/h (120 mph). The first Schneider Trophy competition, held on 16 April 1913 at Monaco, was won by a Deperdussin floatplane at an average speed of 73.63 km/h (45.75 mph).

== Deperdussin arrested ==
On 6 August 1913, Armand Deperdussin was arrested for fraud. He had developed expensive tastes and in addition to funding competitions such as the Gordon Bennett Cup, he entertained lavishly. The trading arm of the Comptoir Industrial et Colonial bank discovered that he had been funding this through fraudulently obtained loans using forged receipts from his silk business as security. He remained incarcerated until his trial in 1917. Despite claims that he used much of the money to help develop France's aviation expertise, he was convicted and sentenced to five years in prison, but as a concession for first offenders he was reprieved ("sursis") and released immediately. Deperdussin committed suicide in 1924.

== SPAD ==
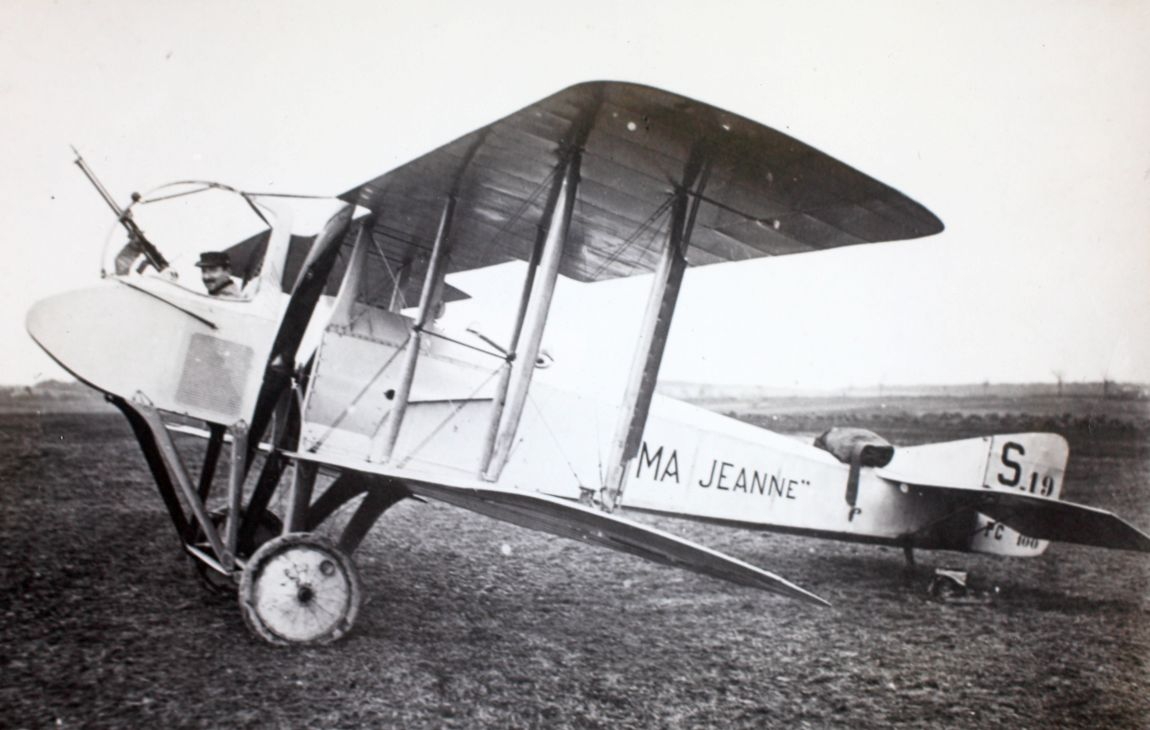
SPAD S.A.2

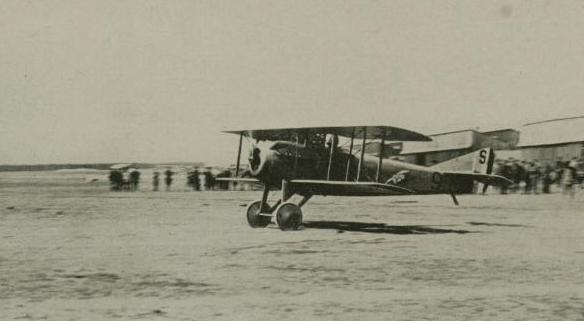
SPAD VII taking off

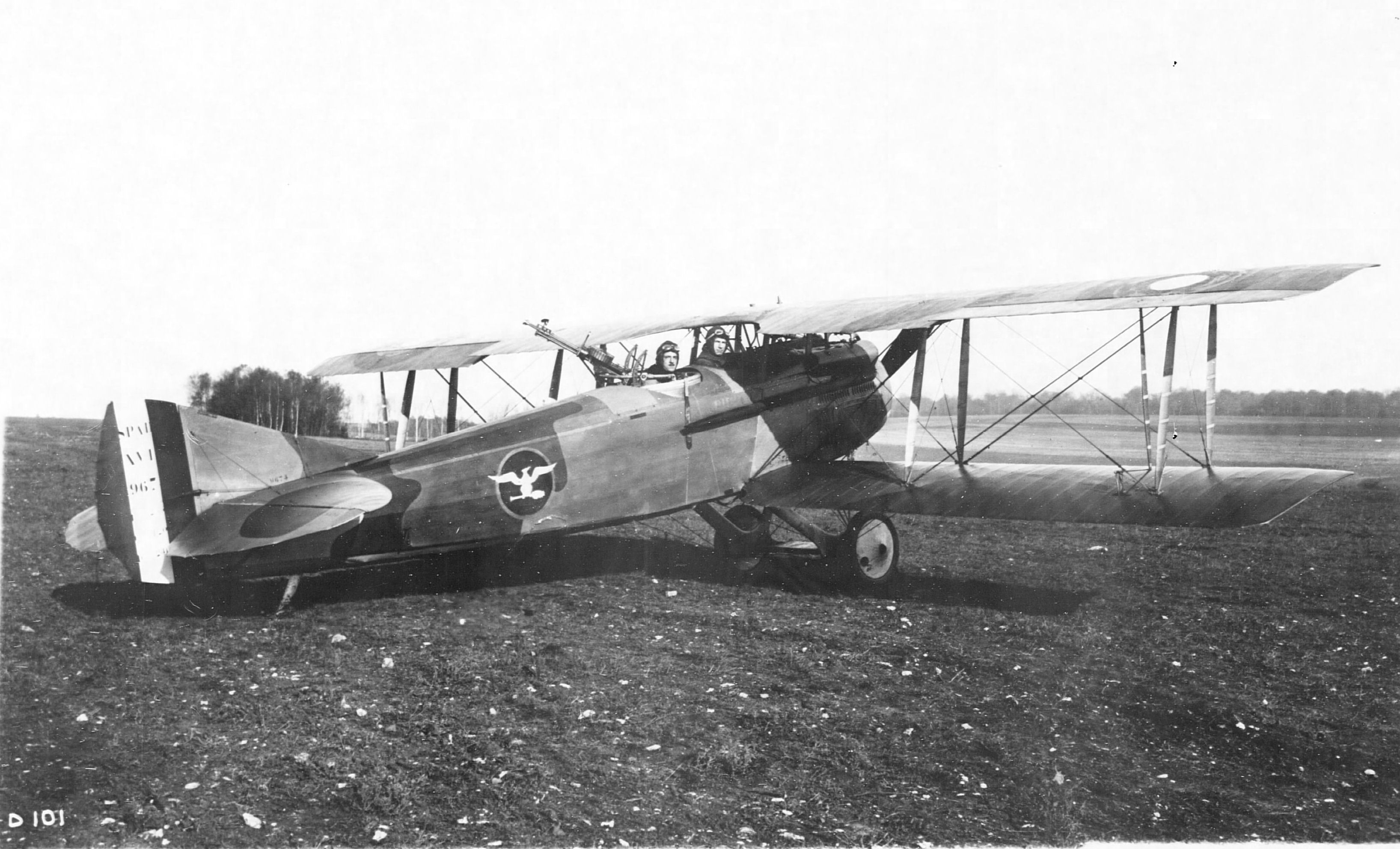
SPAD S.XVI two seater

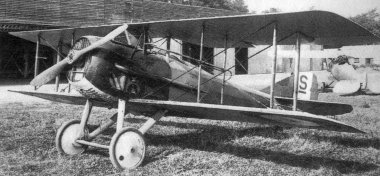
SPAD S.XIII

After Armand Deperdussin's bankruptcy in 1913 the company went into administration and the name was changed to Société Provisoire des Aéroplanes Deperdussin, the first use of the SPAD acronym. With Deperdussin's disgrace, financing stopped and the future of the SPAD company was endangered. A consortium led by Louis Blériot bought the company's assets in 1913 and reorganised it as the Société Pour L'Aviation et ses Dérivés, retaining the SPAD acronym.

The first Béchereau-SPAD designs were unusual two-seat biplanes which attempted to provide a forward-firing machine gun in a tractor configuration aircraft. The pilot sat behind the wings, as in a conventional design, while the observer/gunner was seated in a nacelle, or pulpit, in front of the propeller, attached precariously to the landing gear. These designs, the SPAD A-series of models S.A.1, S.A.2, S.A.3, and S.A.4, were built in small numbers, around sixty each for French (mostly S.A.2) and Russian air forces (mostly S.A.4), and were neither popular nor successful. The availability of the Nieuport 11 and subsequent development of an effective machine gun synchronizer by the French rendered this unusual configuration obsolete.

Other early Béchereau designs for SPAD were less successful. The SE, a large twin-engine biplane bomber, performed well on trials, but it was not ordered.

Béchereau's first real success was the SPAD S.VII, which superficially resembled a smaller, neater A.2, without the forward gunner's nacelle. Developed from the SPAD V, of which 268 were ordered but none built as SPAD Vs, the SPAD S.VII was a single-seat tractor biplane fighter of simple and robust design powered by the new Hispano-Suiza water-cooled V-8 engine. Compared to earlier fighters, when the SPAD VII appeared in 1916 it was a heavy and unmanoeuvrable aircraft, but pilots learned to take advantage of its speed and strength. Some 3,500 SPAD S.VIIs were built in France, 120 in Britain, and 100 in Russia before their capitulation, although many more had been ordered from a new factory in Yaroslavl, which was not completed until after the Russian Civil War. Béchereau's subsequent wartime designs followed the basic outline of the SPAD S.VII. The two-seaters, the SPAD XI and SPAD XVI, were built in moderate numbers, around 1,000 of each type, but two-seater SPADs were much less successful than the rival Breguet 14 (5,500 built) and Salmson 2 (3,200 built). Single-seat developments of the SPAD VII were more successful. The SPAD XII was a minor variant, the first to use the geared Hispano-Suiza V-8 engine, which allowed it to be armed with a 37 mm (1.46 in) single-shot Hotchkiss cannon (moteur-canon) firing through the propeller hub. Tested successfully by ace Georges Guynemer, the conclusion was that only very skilled pilots could exploit its powerful armament. Accordingly, although 300 were ordered, most were completed as normal SPAD fighters, with one (flown by Charles J. Biddle while with the USAAS' 13th Aero Squadron) and two may have served with the US Air Service in France.

The SPAD S.XIII was essentially an enlarged SPAD S.VII redesigned around a more powerful geared drive Hispano-Suiza engine, as used on the SPAD XII. This was produced in much greater numbers: the exact total is uncertain, with figures from 7,300 to 8,472 being quoted by different sources. Single-seat SPADs were flown by many ace pilots, including Italy's Count Francesco Baracca and the United States Army Air Service's Capt. Eddie Rickenbacker, with 34 and 26 victories respectively. Georges Guynemer was, as has already been noted, highly successful with the SPAD S.XII, as well as the SPAD S.VII and SPAD S.XIII. At the end of the First World War, all 1,152 single-seat fighters on the strength of French front line air units were SPAD 13s. Nearly 900 SPAD XIII fighters were reported as being used in American service.

Although SPAD had been successful, they were unable to keep up with demand and production of their later fighters was spread out among other aircraft manufacturers, including both direct competitors, as well as numerous companies that would become well known after the war. In 1916, over 98% of SPAD production came from SPAD and Blériot factories. By 1918, this had fallen to 43%, with the majority of SPAD XIII production from licensed manufacturers. SPAD designs accounted for around 20% of French aircraft produced during World War One.

== Blériot-SPAD ==
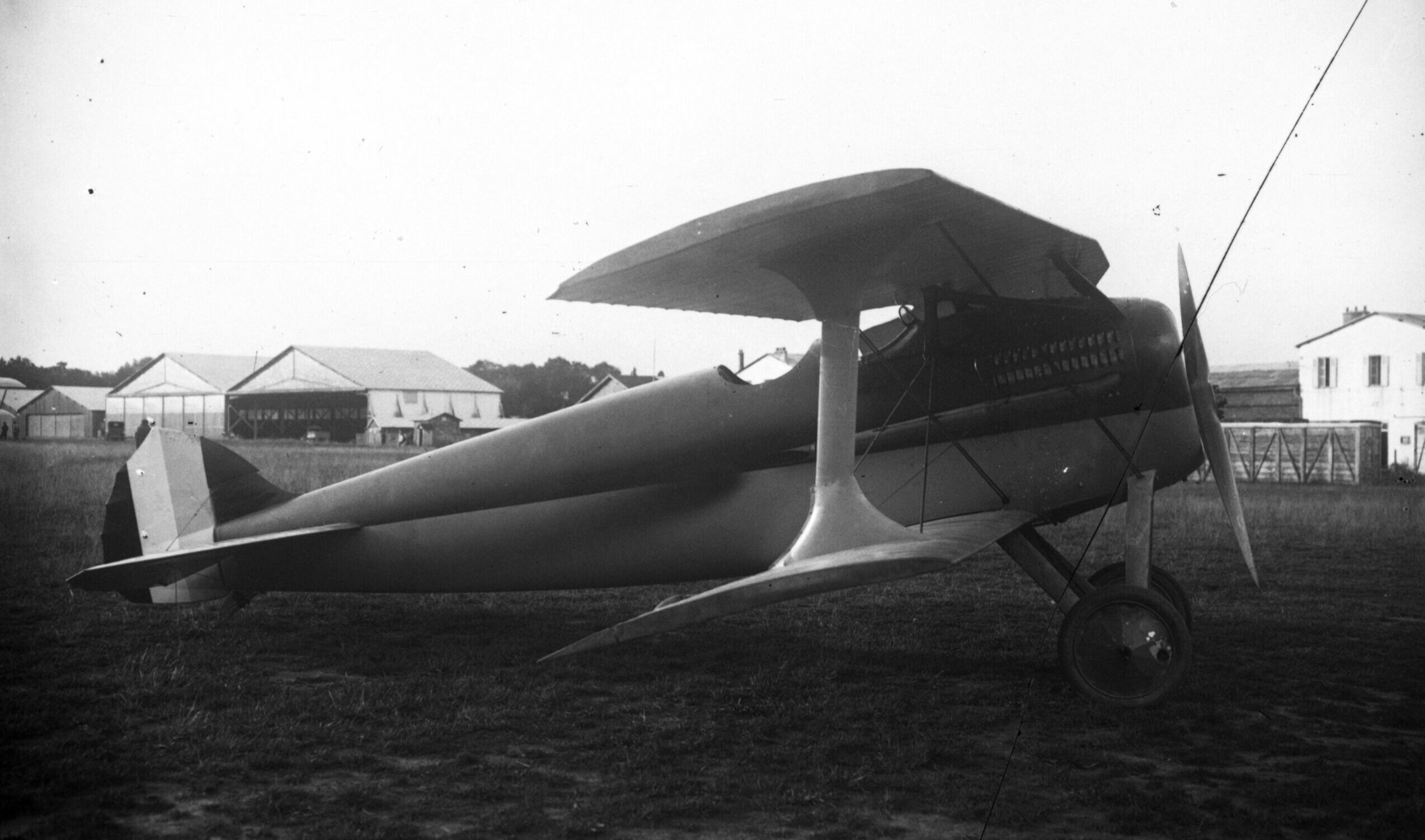
SPAD S.XX

Post-war the company became Blériot-SPAD. The first of its designs to be known by this name was Bécherau's monocoque SPAD S.XX biplane. Despite the prototype being flown in 1918, SPAD 20 deliveries did not begin until 1920 when post war reductions and a preference for the more capable Nieuport-Delage NiD.29 limited orders to 93.

The return of peace also meant that the company had to deal with substantial liabilities under the excess profits tax of 1 July 1916. As modified in 1917, this imposed an 80% tax rate on "excess profits". With the future uncertain, SPAD was fully incorporated into the Blériot organisation in 1921, and the company effectively disappeared, although a number of Blériot types were marketed as SPADs.

== Aircraft ==
- De Feure-Deperdussin 2 Monoplane 1910
- Deperdussin Type A 1910
- Deperdussin Type B 1911 - including variants "Sports" and "Military"
- Deperdussin concours militaire 1911
- Deperdussin Type C
- Deperdussin 1912 Racing Monoplane
- Deperdussin Monocoque
- Deperdussin Coupe Schneider
- Deperdussin T
- Deperdussin TT
- Deperdussin Seagull
- SPAD S.A-1 thru 4
- SPAD S.G2
- SPAD S.V
- SPAD S.VII
- SPAD S.XI
- SPAD S.XII
- SPAD S.XIII
- SPAD S.XIV
- SPAD S.XV
- SPAD S.XVI
- SPAD S.XVII
- SPAD S.XVIII
- SPAD S.XIX
- SPAD S.XX

== See also ==
- Etienne Dormoy
- Frederick Koolhoven
- Henry Petre - Deperdussin flying school, Brooklands
- John Cyril Porte - British Deperdussin
- Jules Védrines
