= SPAD S.XI =

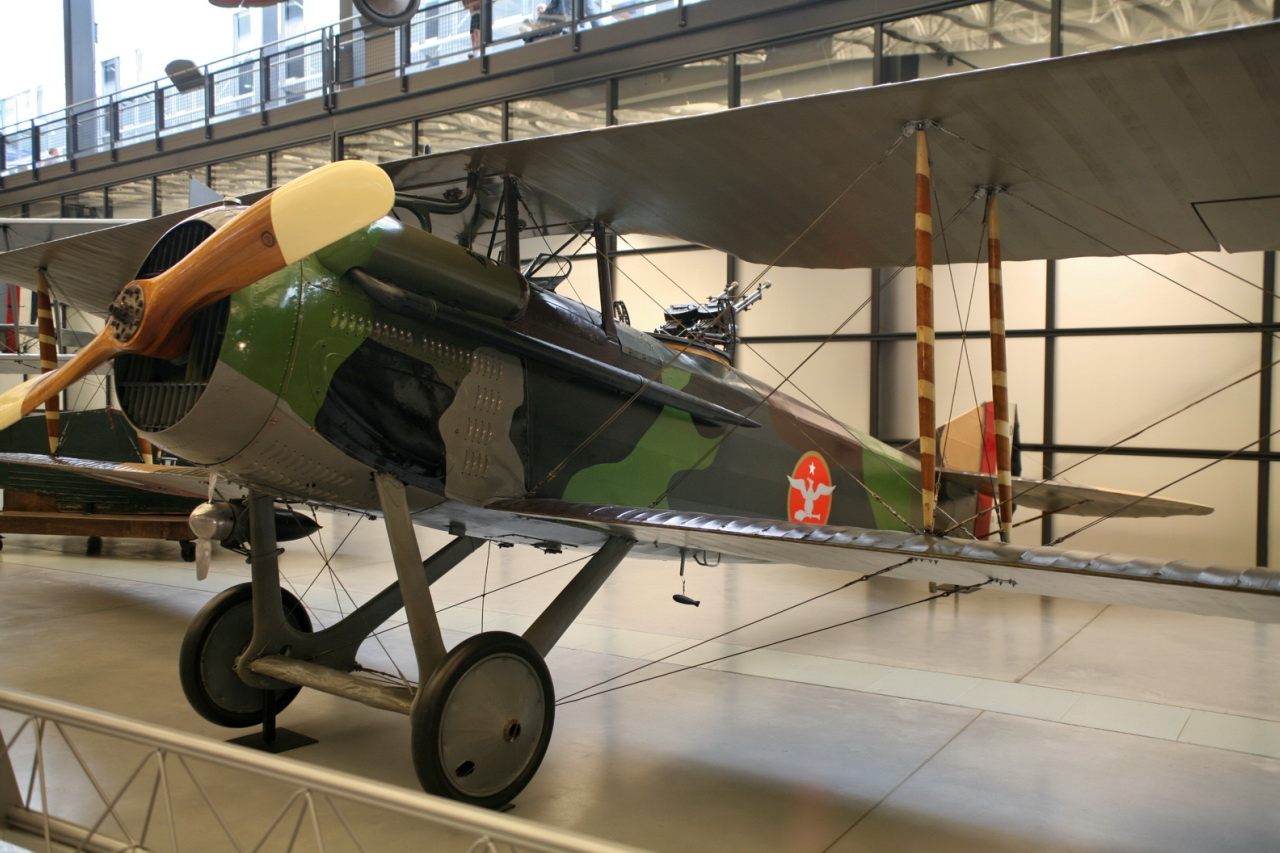
- Spad XVI at National Air and Space Museum

General information
- Type: Reconnaissance aircraft
- Manufacturer: SPAD
- Designer: Louis Béchereau
- Primary users: Aéronautique Militaire Red Army
- Number built: 1,000

The SPAD S.XI or SPAD 11 is a French two-seat biplane reconnaissance aircraft of the First World War. The SPAD 11 was the work of Louis Béchereau, chief designer of the Société Pour L'Aviation et ses Dérivés (SPAD), who also designed the highly successful SPAD 7 and SPAD 13 single-seat fighter aircraft. It was developed under military specification C2, which called for a two-seat fighter aircraft. As a result of its failure to meet the levels of performance and agility demanded by the C2 specification, the SPAD 11 was used, along with the more successful Salmson 2 and Breguet 14, to replace ageing Sopwith 1½ Strutter and Dorand AR reconnaissance aircraft. Persistent problems with the SPAD 11 led to its early replacement by the SPAD S.XVI or SPAD 16 variant.

The SPAD 11 had some resemblance to Béchereau's single-seat fighters and employed much the same method of simple construction. Longer and heavier than the fighters, the SPAD 11's lower wings were designed with cut-outs to improve the observer's view of the ground. The aircraft was armed with a single 0.303-inch (7.7 mm) Vickers machine gun firing forward and a single Lewis machine gun of the same calibre on a flexible mount for the observer. Testing of the SPAD 11 showed poor performance, said to be little better than that of the SPAD S.A of 1915 and it was rejected as a C.2 class fighter aircraft, being reclassified as an A.2 reconnaissance aircraft.

Further problems were encountered with the SPAD 11's Hispano-Suiza 8B engine. Some aircraft were fitted with a 12-cylinder Renault engine, but this lowered the aircraft's poor performance yet more. Handling problems were encountered, including tail-heaviness, making the aircraft tiring to fly, and a propensity to stall. In spite of these flaws, the SPAD was still superior to the Sopwiths and Dorands, and 12 squadrons were fully equipped with SPAD 11s. Some 1,000 SPAD 11s were built, most of which were out of service by the autumn of 1918, in most cases replaced by the SPAD S.XVI.

Three Belgian squadrons used the SPAD 11 and two from the United States. The SPAD 11 was unpopular in American service, as in French, and so much so that one of the two squadrons issued with SPADs replaced them with Sopwith 1½ Strutters. Uruguay purchased a small number of aircraft after the war and some examples are known to have been used by Russia and Japan.

A single SPAD 11 was modified as a night fighter, fitted with a searchlight on a framework mounted ahead of the propeller, under the Cn2 specification.

== SPAD S.XVI ==
The SPAD 16 was a development of the SPAD 11. It was essentially a SPAD 11 with a Lorraine-Dietrich engine of 240 bhp, or 250 bhp according to some sources. The new engine, while more powerful, resulted in a heavier aircraft and performance was slightly inferior to the SPAD 11. The original handling problems were largely unresolved.

The SPAD 16 arrived at the front line around the end of 1917. It equipped 27 French squadrons and 305 two-seater SPADs, mainly SPAD 16s, which were in service with French reconnaissance squadrons at the armistice, as opposed to 530 Salmson and 645 Breguet reconnaissance aircraft. The SPAD 16 served with five post-war French squadrons.

Six SPAD 16s were bought by the United States. One of these, flown by Billy Mitchell, is preserved at the National Air and Space Museum. He personally flew reconnaissance missions in it when the Second Battle of the Marne started in the Château-Thierry sector, in July 1918.

The exact number of SPAD 16s built is uncertain but was probably around 1,000.

== Operators ==
Belgium

- Belgian Air Force

France

- French Air Force

Japan

- Imperial Japanese Army Air Service

Kingdom of Italy

- Corpo Aeronautico Militare

Russia / Soviet Union

- Imperial Russian Air Force
- Soviet Air Force - Postwar.

Uruguay

- Uruguayan Air Force

United States

- American Expeditionary Force

== Specifications (SPAD S.XI A.2) ==
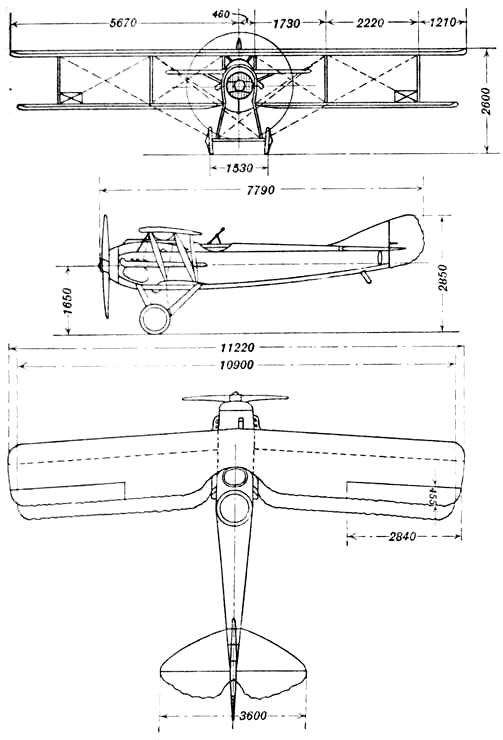
SPAD XI drawing

Data from The Complete Book of Fighters

General characteristics

- Crew: 2
- Length: 7.84 m (25 ft 9 in)
- Wingspan: 11.21 m (36 ft 9 in)
- Height: 2.80 m (9 ft 2 in)
- Wing area: 30.00 m^{2} (322.9 sq ft)
- Empty weight: 679 kg (1,497 lb)
- Gross weight: 1,035 kg (2,282 lb)
- Powerplant: 1 × Hispano-Suiza 8Bc water-cooled V-8 engine, 160 kW (220 hp)

Performance

- Maximum speed: 180 km/h (110 mph, 97 kn)
- Endurance: 2.25 hr
- Service ceiling: 7,000 m (22,965 ft)
- Time to altitude: 3,000 m (9,850 ft) in 12.6 min

Armament

- Guns: 1× fixed forward firing Vickers machine gun and 1× flexibly mounted Lewis gun in rear cockpit

== Bibliography ==
- Angelucci, Enzo. The Rand McNally Encyclopedia of Military Aircraft, 1914-1980. San Diego, California: The Military Press, 1983. ISBN 0-517-41021-4.
- Cony, Christophe (August 1997). "Aviateur d'Observation en 14/18 (3ème partie et fin)". Avions: Toute l'aéronautique et son histoire (in French) (53): 16–20. ISSN 1243-8650.
- Cortet, Pierre (May 1998). "Rétros du Mois" [Retros of the Month]. Avions: Toute l'aéronautique et son histoire (in French) (62): 5. ISSN 1243-8650.
- Davilla, James J., & Soltan, Arthur M., French Aircraft of the First World War. Stratford, Connecticut: Flying Machines Press, 1997. ISBN 0-9637110-4-0
- Green, William and Gordon Swanborough. The Complete Book of Fighters. New York: Smithmark, 1994. ISBN 0-8317-3939-8.
- Munson, Kenneth. Aircraft of World War I. London: Ian Allan, 1967. ISBN 0-7110-0356-4.
