= Deperdussin Monocoque =

1912 racing aircraft by Deperdussin

- The Deperdussin Monocoque racer and four of its pilots. From left to right: Guillaume Busson, René Vidart, Jules Védrines and Maurice Prévost

General information
- Type: Racer
- Manufacturer: Société Pour les Appareils Deperdussin (SPAD)
- Designer: Louis Béchereau

History
- First flight: 1912

The Deperdussin Monocoque was an early racing aircraft built in 1912 by the Aéroplanes Deperdussin, a French aircraft manufacturer started in 1911 and reorganized as the Société Pour L'Aviation et ses Dérivés (SPAD) in 1913. It is so named because of the method of construction of its fuselage. The aircraft is noted for winning the Gordon Bennett Trophy in 1912 and 1913, and for raising the world speed record for aircraft to 130 mph (210 km/h).

== Background ==
The usual method of construction of an aircraft's fuselage at this time was to use a wire braced box-girder covered in fabric. The first use of monocoque construction in aviation is attributed to Eugene Ruchonnet, a Swiss marine engineer who had built an aircraft nicknamed the Cigare in 1911, which had a fuselage constructed by building up several layers of thin wood, each lamination applied at right angle to the one underneath.

== Design ==
The Deperdussin Monocoque was a mid-wing monoplane with parallel-chord wings with the spars made of hickory and ash, and ribs made of pine. The fuselage was made in two halves, each made by glueing and pinned a layer of tulip wood to a framework of hickory supported by a former, and then applying two further layers of tulipwood, the thickness of the shell being around 4 mm (5/32 in). The shells were then removed from the formers, internal fittings added and the two halves glued together and covered in fabric. Every effort was made to reduce drag: a large spinner was fitted over the hub of the propeller and the undercarriage was an aerodynamically clean design made from a pair of U-shaped plywood frames.

== Service history ==
Jules Védrines won the 1912 Gordon Bennett Trophy race in a Monocoque, with Maurice Prévost coming second in another Monocoque.

Deperdussin entered three aircraft for the 1913 race, which was held as part of the week-long aviation meeting at Rheims in September 1913. Prévost, Eugène Gilbert and Rost were selected in elimination trials to decide the three pilots who would form the French team. A fourth Monocoque was entered by Crombez, representing Belgium. Prévost's aircraft had been modified by reducing the span of the wings. The race was won by Prévost, who completed the 200 km (120 mi) course in 59 min 45.6 seconds, at an average speed of 200.80 km/h (124.77 mph) Védrines was second in a Ponnier monoplane, while Monocoques placed third (Gilbert) and fourth (Crombez).

== Appearances in film ==
A reproduction made an appearance in the 1978 film The 39 Steps. During the search for Richard Hannay across the English and Scottish countryside, Prussian agents use a Monocoque to hunt for Hannay. The machine does not have a rotary engine but rotary engine sounds are frequently employed while the aircraft is in flight.

== Aircraft on display ==
An example is on display in the French Air and Space Museum at Le Bourget, near Paris.

== Specifications (1913 Gordon Bennett winner) ==
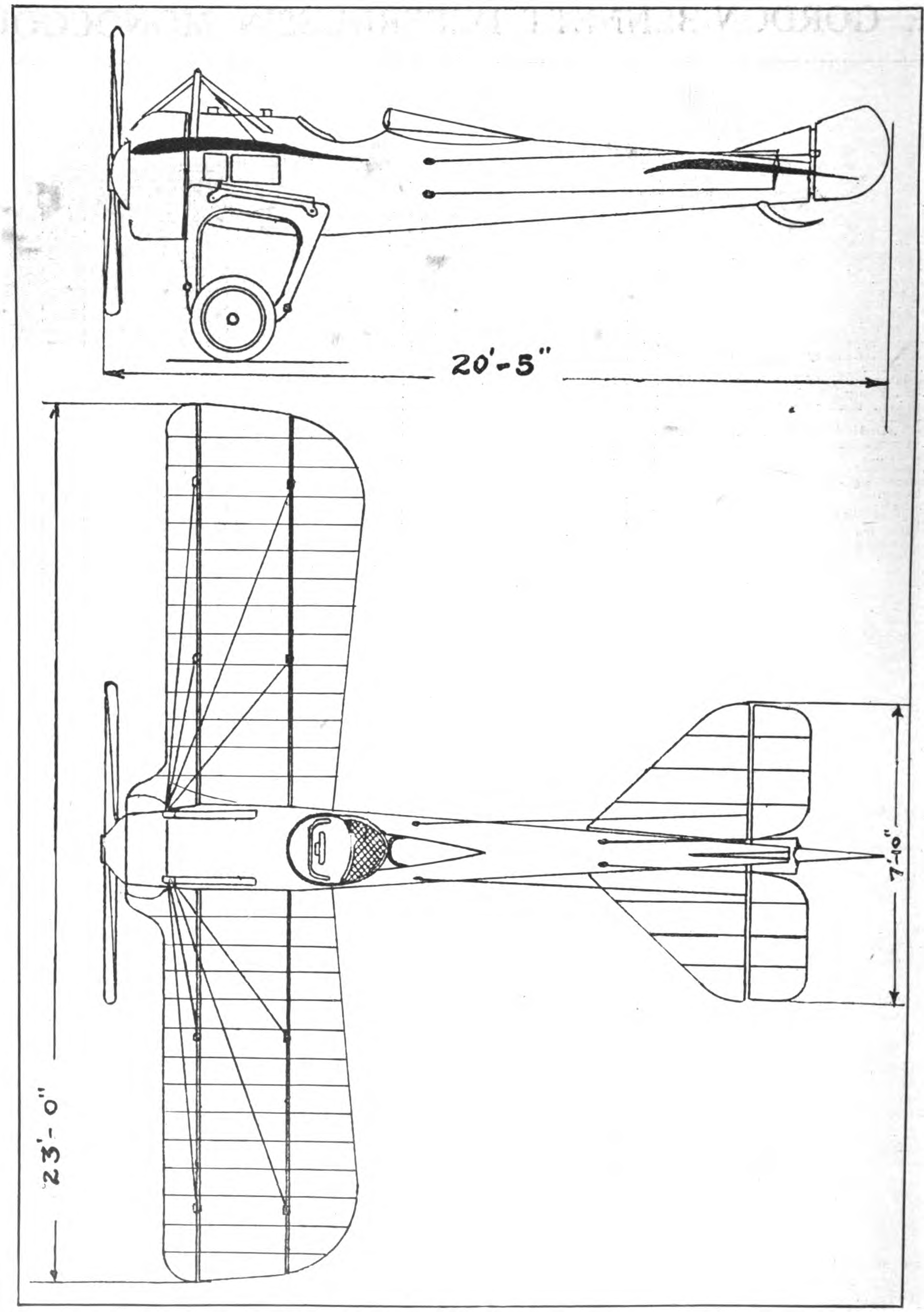
Deperdussin racer two-view drawing, from Aero and Hydro, volume 1, page 4

Data from

General characteristics

- Crew: 1
- Length: 6.1 m (20 ft)
- Wingspan: 6.65 m (21 ft 10 in)
- Wing area: 9.7 m^{2} (104 sq ft)
- Gross weight: 612 kg (1,350 lb)
- Powerplant: 1 × Gnome Lambda Lambda air cooled 14-cylinder two-row rotary, 120 kW (160 hp)
- Propellers: 2-bladed Chauvière , 2.31 m (7 ft 7 in) diameter

Performance

- Maximum speed: 210 km/h (130 mph, 110 kn)
