= Maurice Prévost =

French aviator

Lucien Maurice Prévost
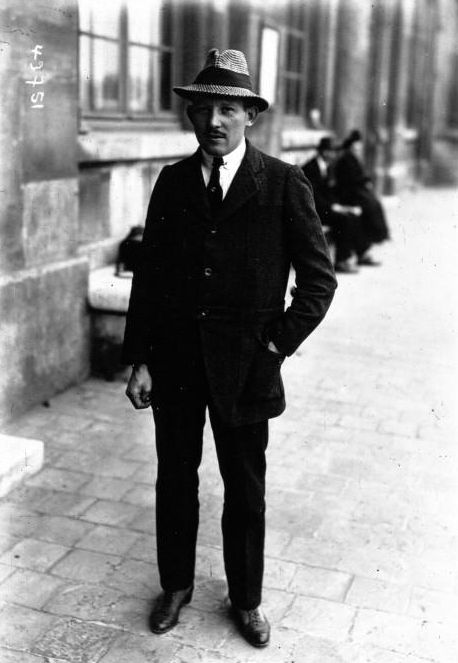
- In Reims at the Gordon-Bennett cup
- Born: 22 September 1887; Reims
- Died: 27 November 1952 (aged 65); Neuilly-sur-Seine
- Occupation: Aviator
- Known for: Winning Schneider Trophy 1913; Winning Gordon Bennett
- Awards: Officer of the Legion of Honour

Lucien Maurice Prévost, known as Maurice Prévost (French: [mɔʁis pʁevo]; 22 September 1887 in Reims – 27 November 1952 in Neuilly-sur-Seine), was a French pioneer aviator, best remembered for winning the first Schneider Trophy race in 1913, and the Gordon Bennett Trophy in the same year.

Maurice Prévost was born in Reims at 5 rue Flodoard. He studied at the Practical School of Commerce and Industry of Reims. Joining the Betheny Deperdussin Aviation School in November 1910, Prévost rose to chief instructor. He obtained his civil pilot's license on 29 April 1911 (#475), and his military wings (#38) on 26 August 1911. He secured third place in the French military aircraft trials in November 1911 and won the altitude competition. In December 1911 he reached 10,000 feet, breaking the world altitude record with a passenger. Prévost won the first Schneider Trophy race at Monaco on 16 April 1913, and on 27 September 1913 he won the Gordon Bennett Trophy.

In 1921 Prévost married Jeanne Catherine Françoise Mulaton (1881–1956) in Reims. He died in 1952 in Neuilly-sur-Seine, and was buried in the "Southern Cemetery" of Reims, his grave being decorated with a bust signed Leon Chavalliaud which was presented to him in 1913 for his Gordon Bennett Cup victory.
