= Descamps 27 =

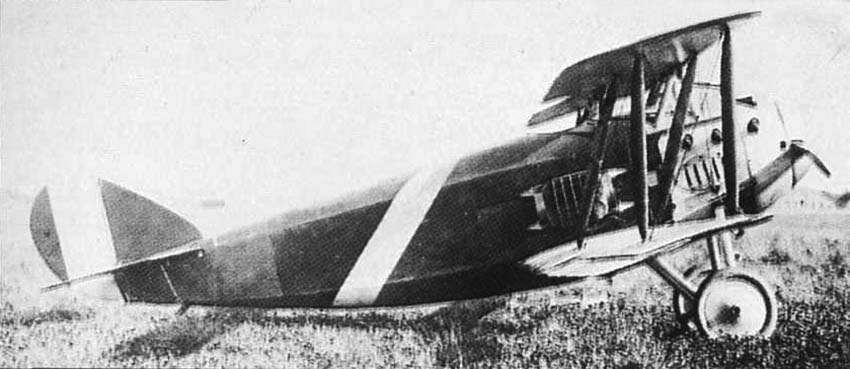

General information
- Type: Single seat fighter
- National origin: France
- Manufacturer: Voisin ??
- Designer: E.A. Descamps
- Number built: 1

History
- First flight: Spring 1919

The Descamps 27 C1 was a single seat biplane fighter aircraft, built in France in 1919. It was unusual in having a forward swept lower wing. After competitive trials, the Nieuport 29 was chosen for production, so only one Descamps was built.

== Design and development ==
The Descamps 27 was a two bay biplane. Its upper and lower wings had the same constant chord and the same spans when the overhangs of the balanced ailerons, fitted only to the lower wing, were included. There was forward stagger, so each pair of parallel interplane struts leant forward. The upper wing was unswept but the lower wing had about 7° of forward sweep to improve the pilot's forward and downwards field of view. As a result, the inner interplane strut pairs leant forward more strongly. Short cabane struts held the centre of the upper wing a little above the fuselage; the pilot's open cockpit was under the trailing edge, where there was a shallow cut-out to improve his upward view.

The fighter was powered by a 220 kW (300 hp) Hispano-Suiza 8Fb water-cooled V-8 engine in a round-profiled nose with a large, domed spinner. A pair of forward firing, synchronised 7.7 mm (0.303 in) machine guns were within the cowling above the engine. Behind the engine the fuselage was flat sided, though with rounded top and bottom. A shallow rectangular radiator was fixed against the fuselage on either side of the cockpit. The Descamps' tailplane, which was mounted on top of the fuselage, was small compared with the balanced elevators; together they shared a semi-circular leading edge and a swept trailing edge. The fin was also relatively small compared with the rudder, which was rounded, deep and extended to the keel; it operated in an elevator cut-out.

The landing gear of the Descamps 27 was of the conventional tailskid type. Its mainwheels were on a single axle and fixed to the lower fuselage by a pair of V-form struts.

The Descamps 27 performed well in government comparative trials of it and other single seat fighters but the Nieuport 29 was preferred and went into production. Development of the Descamps machine ended and only one was built.

== Specifications ==
Data from Green and Swanborough (1994) p.175

General characteristics

- Crew: one
- Length: 6.95 m (22 ft 10 in)
- Wingspan: 9.85 m (32 ft 4 in)
- Height: 2.57 m (8 ft 5 in)
- Wing area: 23.1 m^{2} (249 sq ft)
- Empty weight: 732 kg (1,614 lb)
- Gross weight: 1,071 kg (2,361 lb)
- Powerplant: 1 × Hispano-Suiza 8Fb water-cooled V-8, 220 kW (300 hp)
- Propellers: 2-bladed

Performance

- Maximum speed: 230 km/h (140 mph, 120 kn) at sea level, 172 km/h (107 mph) at 7,000 m (23,000 ft)
- Endurance: 2 hr
- Time to altitude: 4.76 min to 2,000 m (6,600 ft)

Armament

- 2× fixed, forward firing, synchronised 7.7 mm (0.303 in) machine guns
