= Avia BH-23 =

BH-23
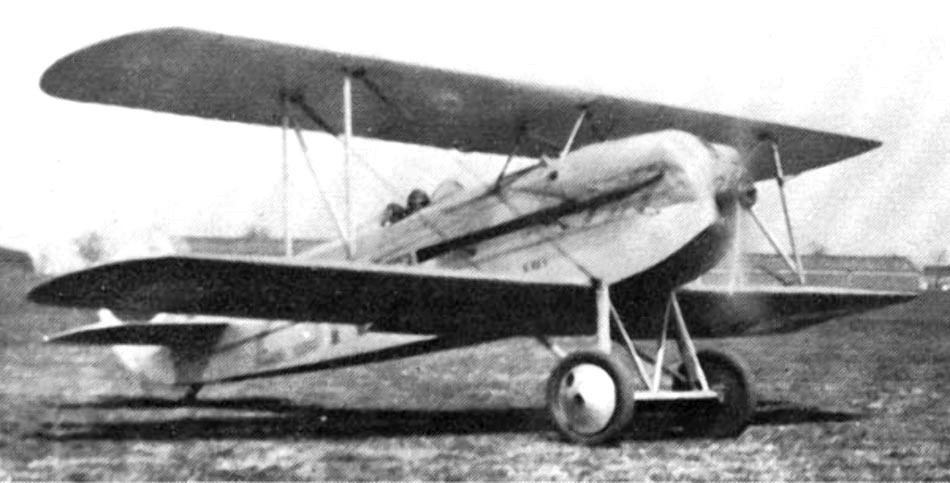

General information
- Type: Military trainer
- Manufacturer: Avia
- Designer: Pavel Beneš and Miroslav Hajn
- Number built: 2

History
- First flight: 1926

The Avia BH-23 was a prototype night fighter aircraft built in Czechoslovakia in 1926. The design was derived from the BH-21 day fighter, incorporating structural changes made to the BH-22 trainer, and the type was originally designated BH-22N. Searchlights and other night-flying equipment were added, but the Czechoslovak Air Force were not interested in the project and no sale resulted.

== Specifications ==
General characteristics

- Crew: one, pilot
- Length: 6.87 m (22 ft 6 in)
- Wingspan: 8.90 m (29 ft 2 in)
- Height: 2.74 m (9 ft 0 in)
- Wing area: 22.0 m^{2} (237 sq ft)
- Empty weight: 705 kg (1,554 lb)
- Gross weight: 879 kg (1,938 lb)
- Powerplant: 1 × Skoda-built Hispano-Suiza 8Aa , 134 kW (180 hp)

Performance

- Maximum speed: 210 km/h (130 mph, 110 kn)

== See also ==
Related development

- BH-17
- BH-21
- BH-22
- BH-33
