= Harkness Hornet =

1920s aircraft engine

Hornet
- Type: four-cylinder inline, water-cooled aircraft engine
- Manufacturer: Harkness

The Harkness Hornet was a four-cylinder inline, water-cooled aircraft engine produced in Australia in the 1920s. It used a cylinder bank from a Hispano-Suiza 8 attached to a crankcase of local design.

With a bore of 4.72 in (120 mm) and a stroke of 5.12 in (130 mm), power was 115 hp (86 kW) at 2,000 rpm.
