= Fokker D.IX =

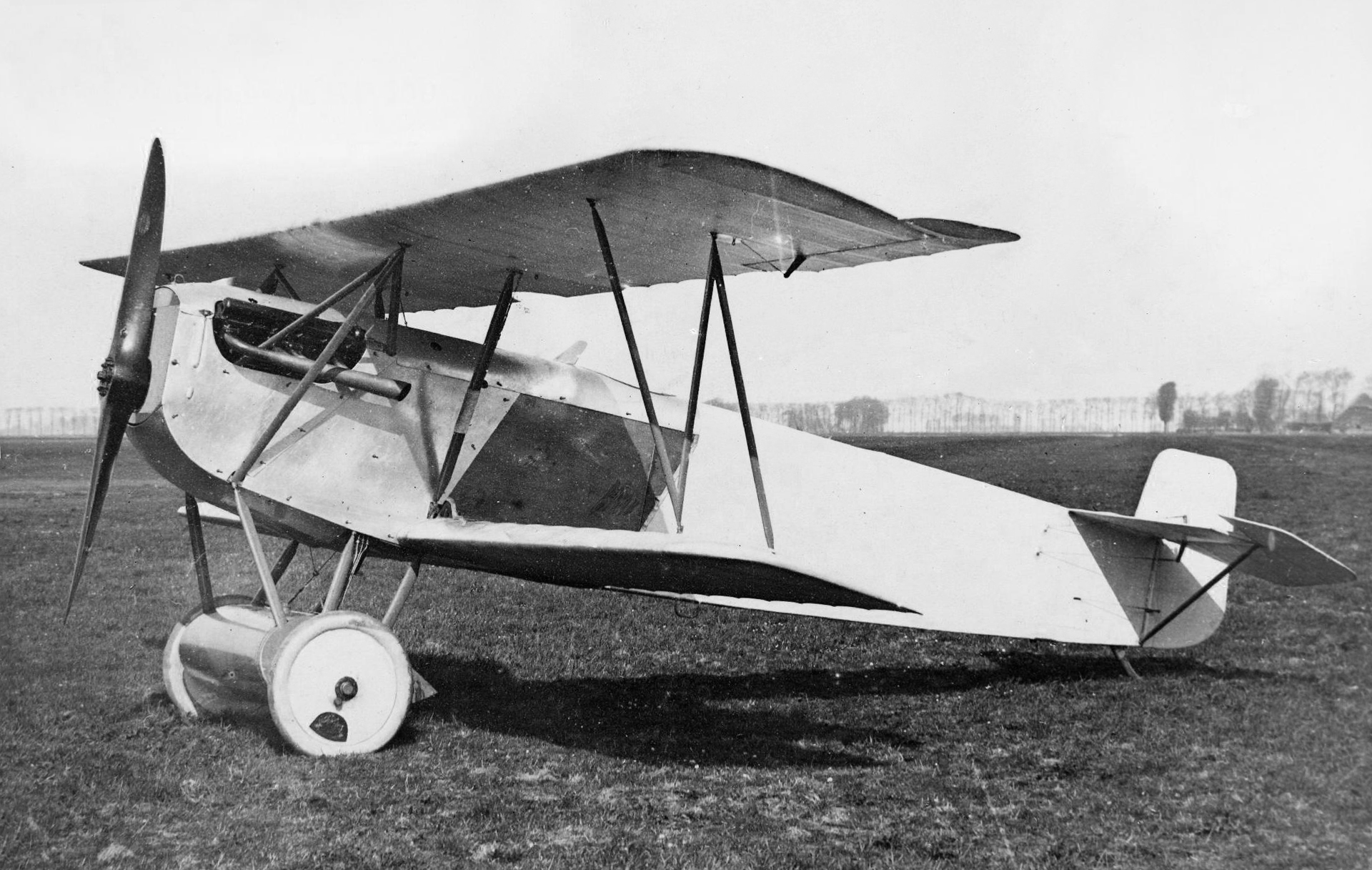

General information
- Type: Singe seat fighter aircraft
- National origin: Netherlands
- Manufacturer: Fokker-Flugzeugwerke
- Number built: 1

History
- First flight: 1921
- Developed from: Fokker D.VII

The Fokker D.IX was a Dutch single seat, single engine fighter aircraft, the final, more powerful evolution of the Fokker D.VII World War I success, flown in 1921. The sole example was purchased by the US Army Air Service but not developed further.

== Design and development ==
The D.IX was the final development of the D.VII, an outstanding World War I fighter. It had a 300 hp (224 kW) Hispano-Suiza 8Fb (Type 42) water-cooled V-8, much more powerful than the D.VII's original 160 hp (120 kW) Mercedes D III engine and even most other engines experimentally fitted to this airframe. Engine installation apart, the D.VII and D.IX were externally similar apart from their empennages.

The D.IX was a single bay biplane, its wings constructed in Fokker's established fashion with two box spars and fabric covering. The interplane struts were N-form while the cabane structure included two fully triangulated forward struts connecting to the forward spar, and a pair of single struts connecting to the rear spar. Ailerons were only fitted on the upper planes.

Its welded steel tube fuselage was flat sided, with the single seat open cockpit behind the trailing edge of the upper wing. The straight edged fin and rudder appeared small though the latter extended down to the keel. The strut braced tailplane was placed on top of the fuselage. The D.IX's fixed conventional undercarriage was of the single axle type, with the mainwheels on V-struts. This was much like that of the D.VII but the airfoil shaped axle fairing was enlarged to contain a fuel tank, an arrangement first trialed in the Fokker V.36. An extra strut from the rear of the tank to the central fuselage underside helped to support it.

The D.IX prototype first flew in 1921.

== Operational history ==
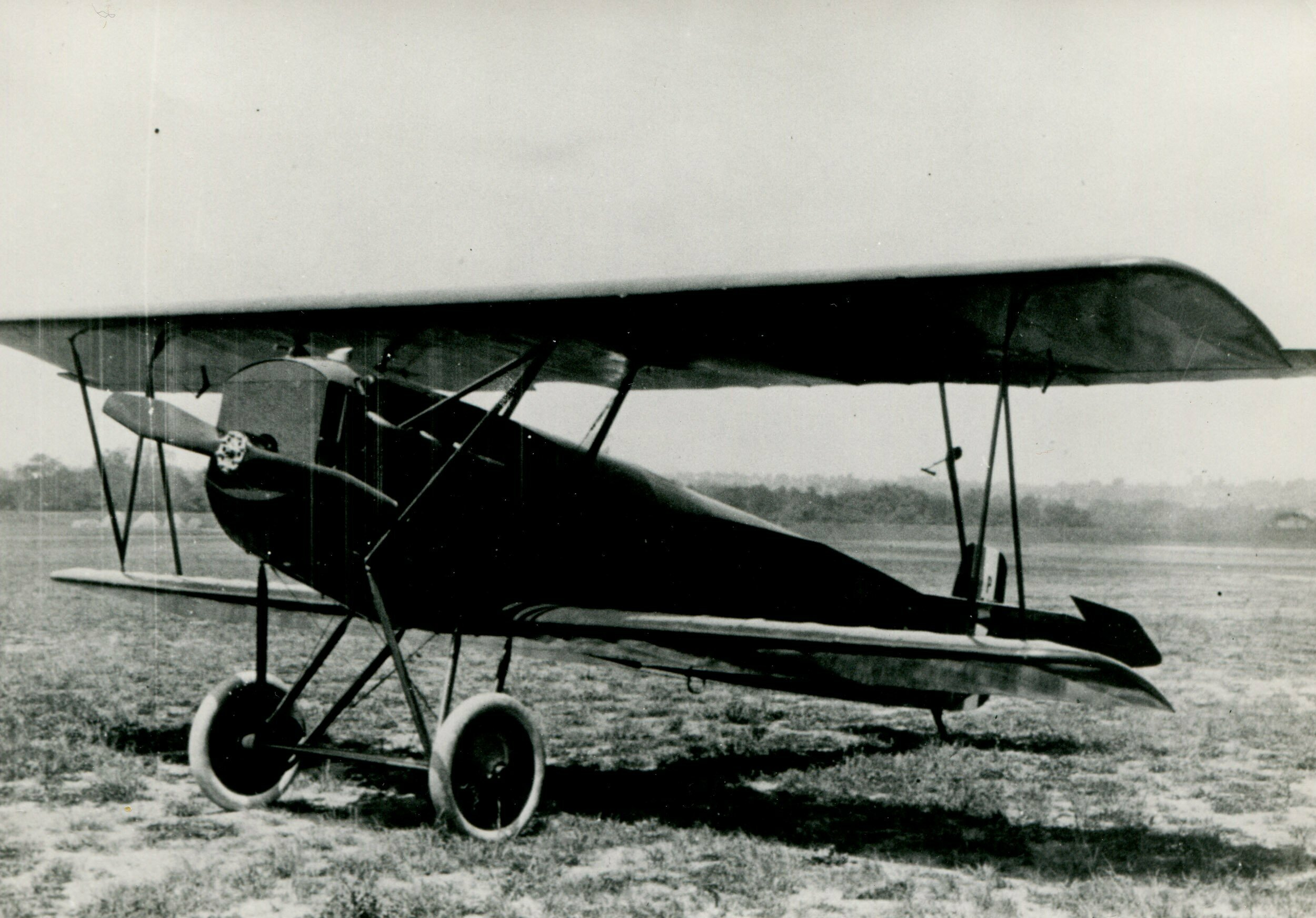
Fokker PW-6

The D.IX was sold to the US Army Air Service (USAAS) in 1922 and shipped to their experimental centre at McCook Field where they had earlier tried a variety of different engines in D.VIIs. They designated it the PW-6. Instead of the original engine a locally built licensed version of the Hispano Type 42, the 320 hp (238 kW) Wright M-2 was fitted. They also fitted armament, two fixed 7.7 mm (0.303 in) machine guns in the upper engine cowling, firing through the propeller. Though it had a maximum speed about 20% greater than that of the standard D.VII and climbed twice as fast, the USAAS concluded it was not worth further development.

== Variants ==
D.IX
Fokker factory designation
PW-6
US Army Air Service (USAAS) designation indicating that it was the sixth water-cooled pursuit (fighter) tested.

== Specifications ==
Data from Green and Swanborough 1994

General characteristics

- Crew: One
- Length: 8.99 m (29 ft 6 in)
- Wingspan: 7.09 m (23 ft 3 in)
- Height: 2.74 m (9 ft 0 in)
- Wing area: 22.11 m^{2} (238.0 sq ft)
- Empty weight: 874 kg (1,927 lb)
- Gross weight: 1,253 kg (2,762 lb)
- Powerplant: 1 × Hispano-Suiza 8Fb water-cooled V-8, 220 kW (300 hp)
- Propellers: 2-bladed

Performance

- Maximum speed: 223 km/h (139 mph, 120 kn) at sea level
- Cruise speed: 188 km/h (117 mph, 102 kn)
- Range: 471 km (293 mi, 254 nmi)
- Time to altitude: 6.3 min to 1.980 m (6,500)
