= Nieuport-Delage NiD 29 =

French WW1/post-WW1/interwar fighter aircraft

NiD 29
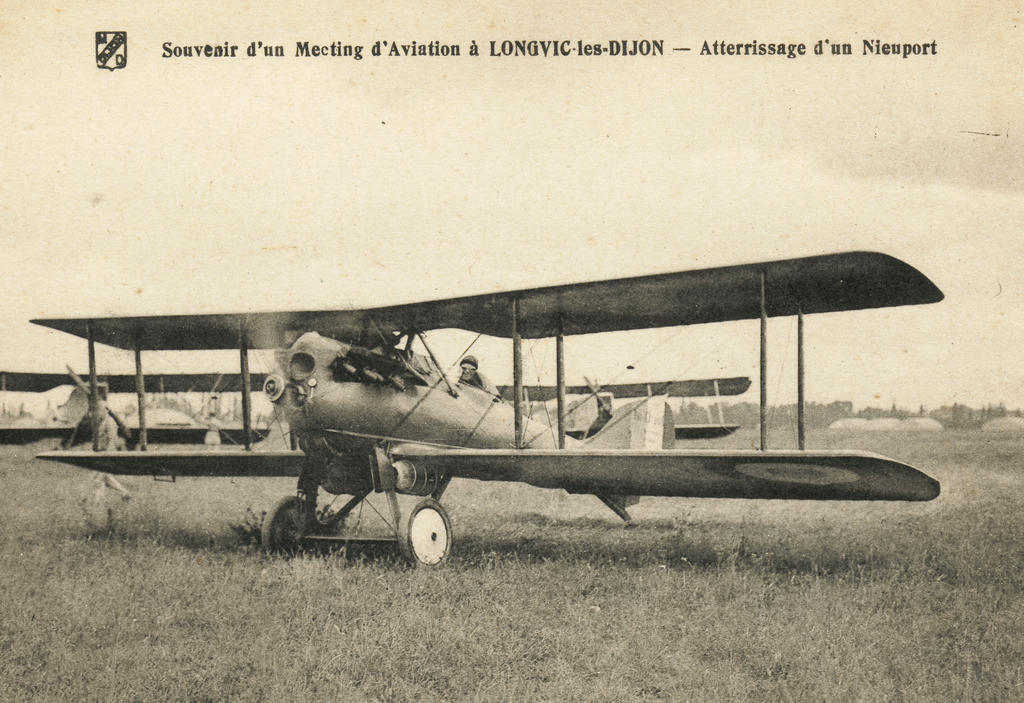

General information
- Type: Single-seat biplane fighter
- National origin: France
- Manufacturer: Nieuport-Delage
- Primary users: French Air Force Imperial Japanese Army, Corpo Aeronautico Militare
- Number built: 1571 ca.

History
- Introduction date: 1922
- First flight: 1918
- Retired: 1930s

The Nieuport-Delage NiD.29 was a French single-seat biplane fighter (C.I category) designed and built by Nieuport-Delage for the French Air Force.

== Design and development ==
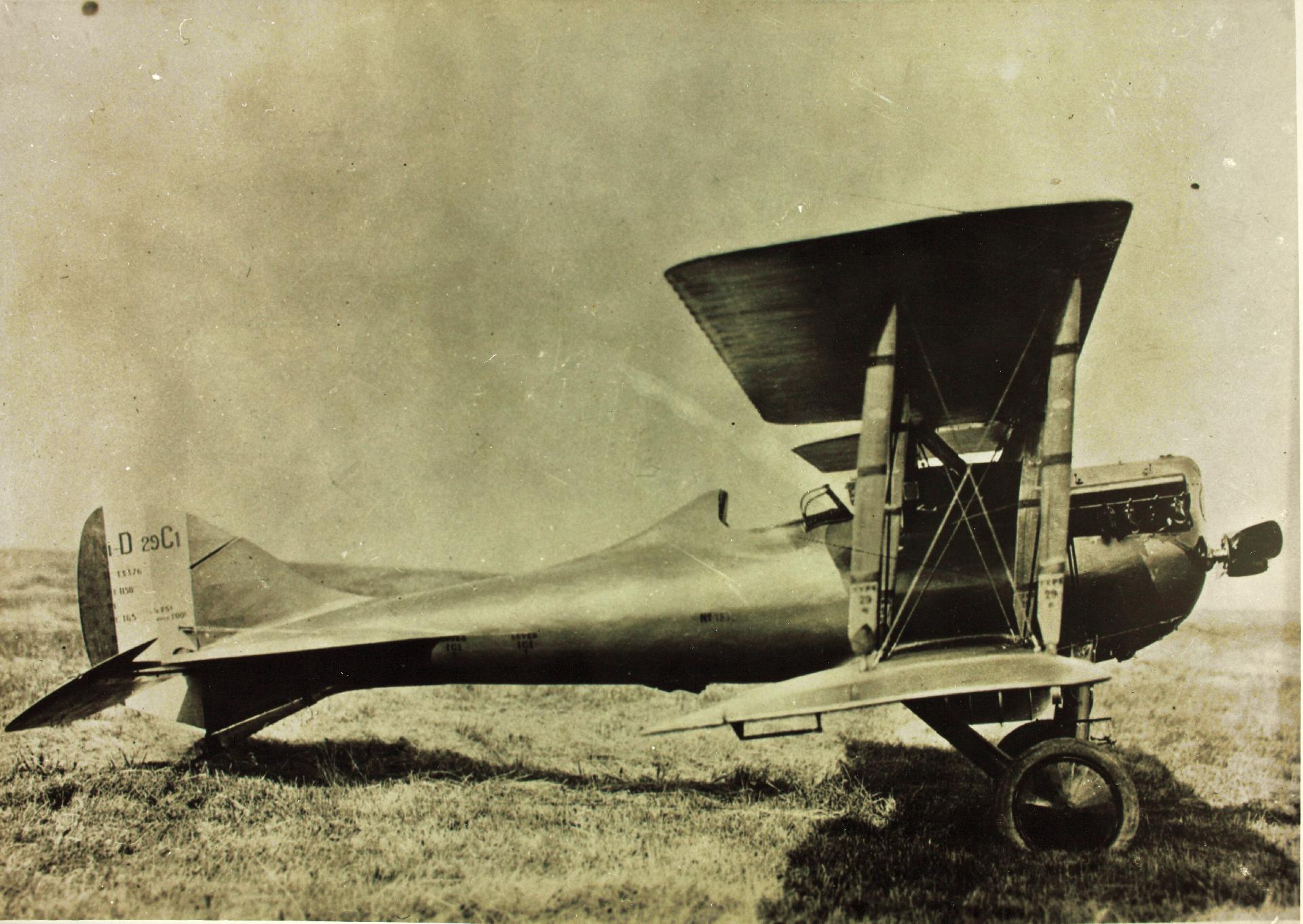
Nieuport-Delage NiD.29 fighter side view

The prototype NiD.29 was an equal-span biplane with ailerons on both upper and lower wings. It had a fixed tailskid landing gear, a nose-mounted engine and a single open cockpit for the pilot. The prototype NiD 29 was evaluated by the French Service Aeronautique de l'Armee in July 1918 and a pre-production batch was ordered on 21 August 1918. It was powered by a 220 kW (300 hp) Hispano-Suiza 8Fb piston engine and performed well in test, but could not achieve the required ceiling. The second prototype was modified with an increased wingspan, and on exceeding the required ceiling it was ordered into production in 1920, becoming the fastest service fighter in the world at that time. Production aircraft did not have ailerons on the upper wing, and the lower wing ailerons were increased in span though reduced in chord.

The first mass production deliveries were made in 1922 to the French Air Force and the type was popular although it did have a tendency to enter a flat spin. The French military bought 250 aircraft which were built by Nieuport and seven other companies. The NiD 29 was to become an important fighter in the 1920s with purchases of 30 by Spain (including 10 Spanish licence-built aircraft) and 108 by Belgium (87 licensed built by SABCA). The Italian Regia Aeronautica bought 175 aircraft including 95 built by Macchi as the Macchi-Nieuport 29 and 80 built by Caproni. Sweden bought nine aircraft and designated them J 2. The Japanese company Nakajima bought a pattern aircraft and built 608 for the Imperial Japanese Army as the Ko-4.

Racing versions of the aircraft were developed and they gained eight world speed records and won the 1920 Gordon Bennett Trophy and the 1922 Coupe Deutsch de la Meurthe competition.

== Operational history ==
Three NiD 29s were modified for reserve Captain Joseph Sadi-Lecointe in November 1925 and used on 70 sorties against insurgents in Morocco using bomb racks with six 10 kg bombs. Spanish aircraft were also involved in similar operations in North Africa.

== Variants ==
Nieuport Ni.29
Prototype for series, powered by a 240 kW (320 hp) Hispano-Suiza 8Fb engine.
NiD.29 C.1
Production aircraft, powered by 240 kW (320 hp) Hispano-Suiza 8Fb engines.
NiD.29 B.1

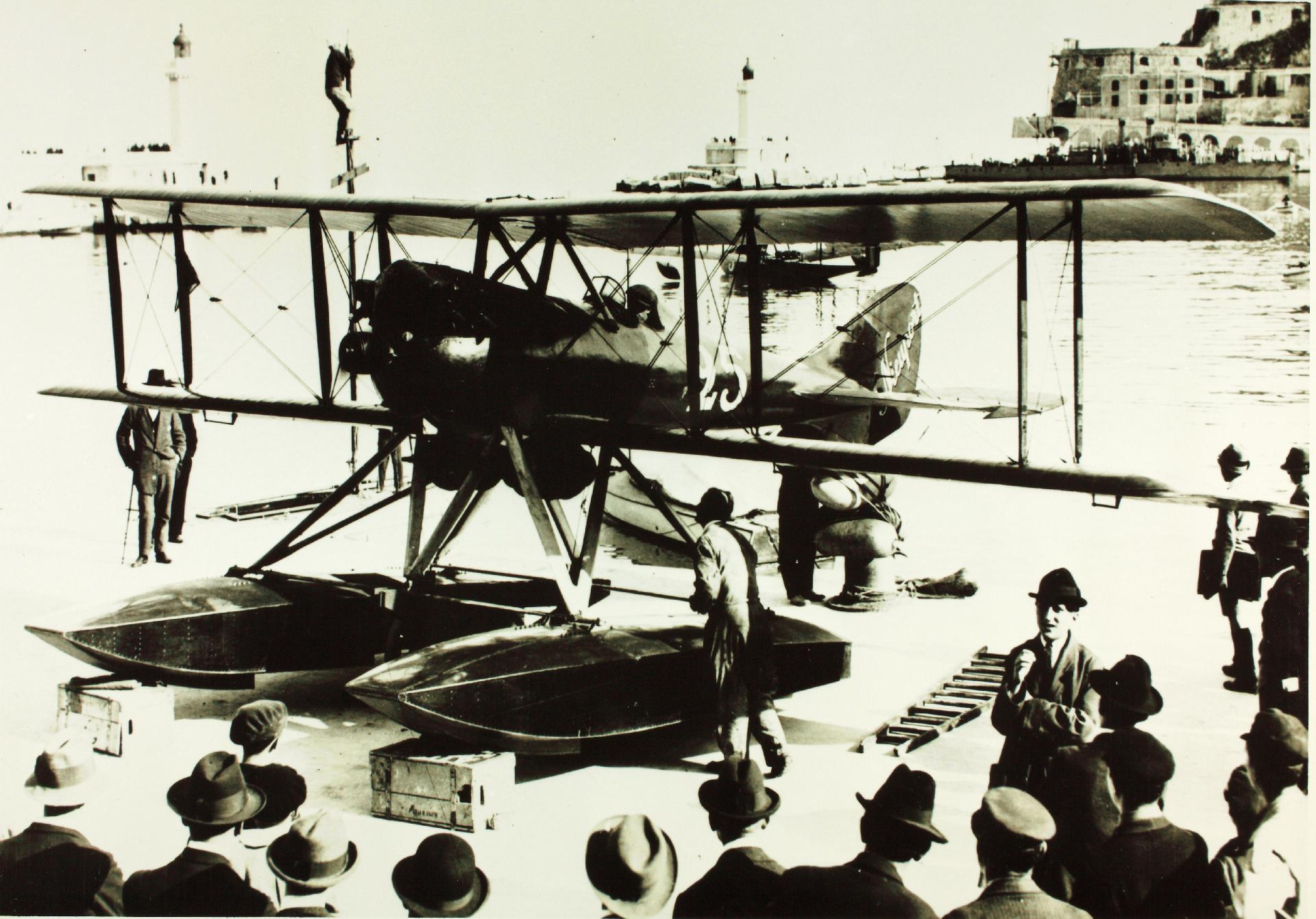
Nieuport-Delage NiD.29G floatplane modified for Grand Prix de Monaco

Small number of conversions as an experimental assault version to carry six 10 kg (22.0 lb) bombs.
NiD.29bis
Prototype only with reduced wing area and steerable tailskid, powered by a 240 kW (320 hp) Hispano-Suiza 8Fb engine.
NiD.29G
Prototypes fitted with a Gnome Monosoupape 9N rotary engine, two later converted to take a Hispano engine and fitted with twin floats and an auxiliary tail float for the Grand Prix de Monaco in 1923.
NiD.29M
Single prototype for Aeronavale (M for Marine) similar to 29G but with 130 kW (180 hp) Le Rhone 9R engine, further converted into 32Rh.
NiD.29D
Conversion with an engine-driven supercharger for an attempt on the altitude record, reached 7,000 m (23,000 ft).
NiD.29 ET.1
Trainer variant with a 134 kW (180 hp) Hispano-Suiza 8Ab engine and a single synchronised Vickers machine gun, three built.
NiD.29 SHV

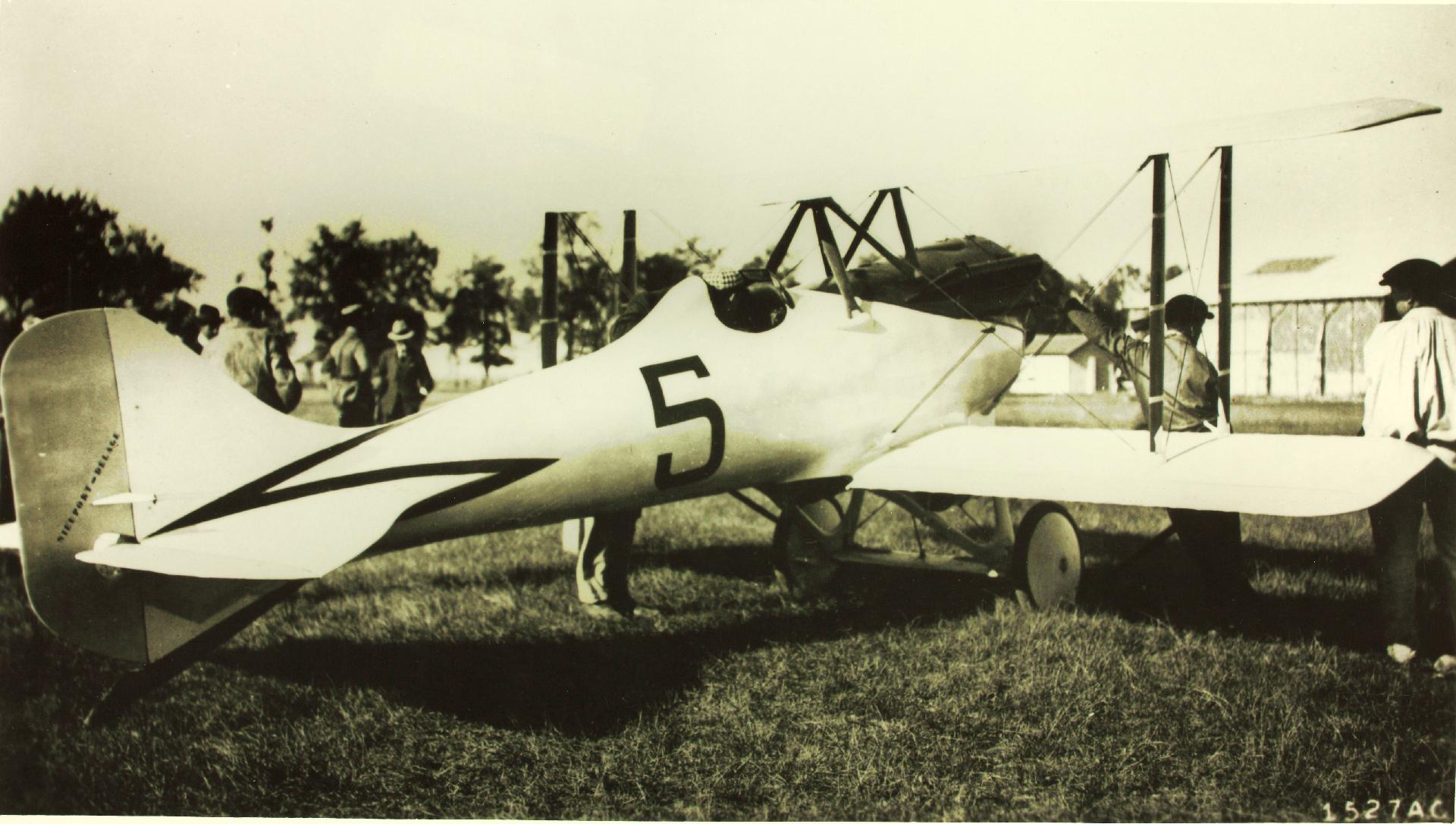
Nieuport-Delage 29V racer

Seaplane for the 1919 Schneider Trophy contest with reduced wingspan and military equipment removed, two aircraft built and one was also entered in the 1921 event but neither aircraft flew in the races. Powered by a 220 kW (300 hp) Hispano-Suiza 8Fb engine
NiD.29V

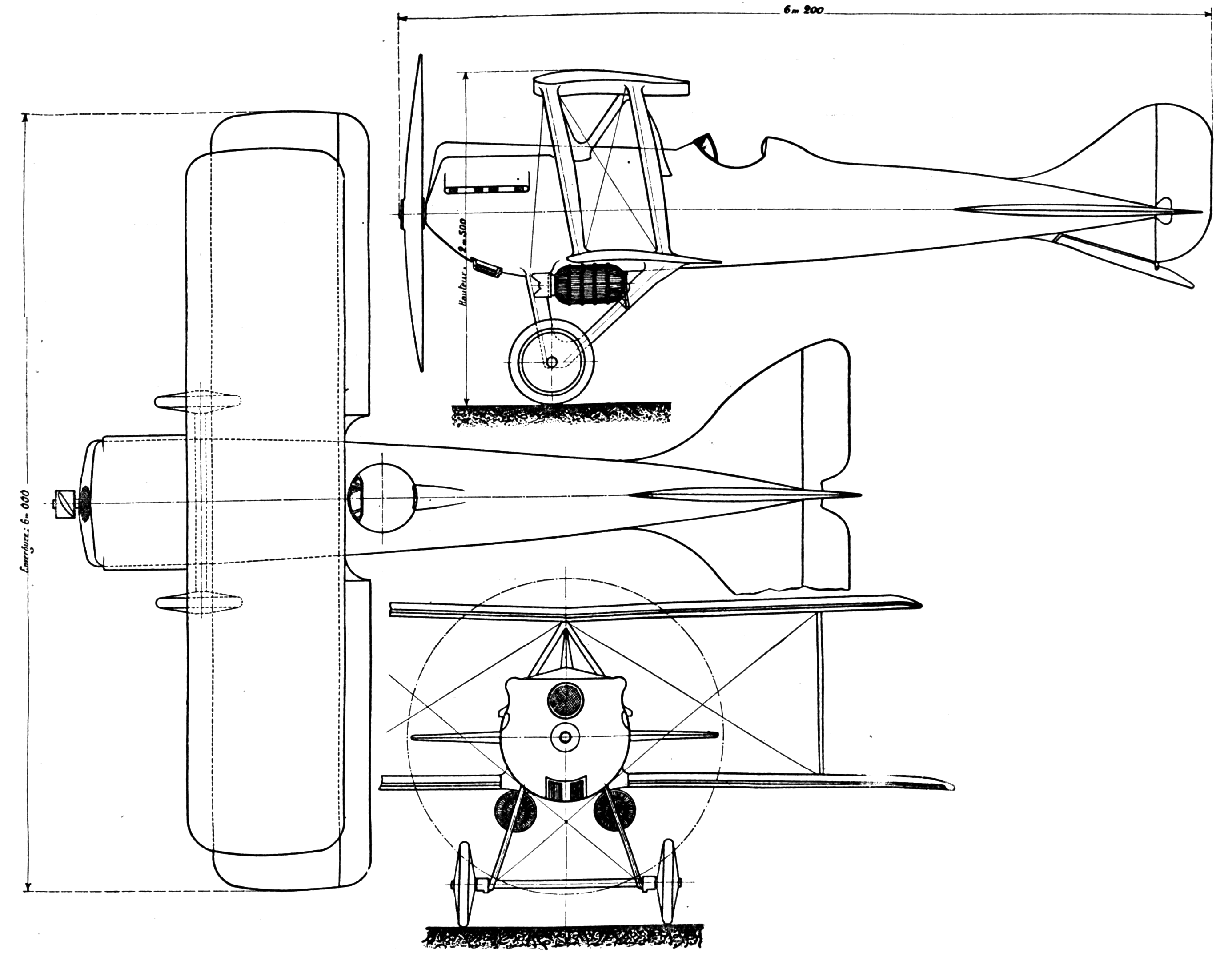
Nieuport-Delage NiD-29V 3-view drawing from L'Aerophile October,1922

Lightweight racer developed in 1919 with a wingspan reduced to 6.00m (19ft 8¼in), powered by a 240 kW (320 hp) Hispano-Suiza 8Fb engine, three built.
NiD.29Vbis
One-off conversion with an enclosed cockpit to gain more speed, the pilot had small teardrop windows on each side with little forward visibility. Powered by a Hispano-Suiza 8Fb engine boosted to give 250 kW (330 hp). On 12 December 1920, Sadi-Lecointe flew the NiD-29Vbis to a new world speed record of 313.043 km/h (194.516 mph; 169.030 kn). The aircraft was lost in a landing accident in 1921.
NiD.32Rh
130 kW (180 hp) Le Rhone rotary-powered derivative for use by the French Navy as a carrier fighter. Ten built including one converted from 29M.
NiD.33 E.2
Two-seat trainer with conventional square-section fabric-covered fuselage. Small numbers used by Japan.
NiD.40 C.1
High altitude fighter with Rateau turbocharger
NiD.40R
One-off modification of NiD.40 C.1 with extended wings and new tail for high-altitude record flights. Later fitted with floats.
Nakajima 甲 4 (Ko 4)
Japanese licence-built NiD.29, 608 built.

== Operators ==
Argentina

- Argentine Army Aviation operated 6 examples from 1925 assigned to the 3rd Observation Group.

Belgium

- Belgian Air Force operated 108 examples of which 88 were built locally by SABCA from 1922 until replaced by Avia BH-21s from 1927 and Fairey Firefly IIM in 1931

Republic of China

- Guangxi operated 12 examples purchased from Japan from 1935
- Manchuria operated 4 examples purchased from a Japanese mission in 1931

France

- French Air Force operated over 600 from 1922
- French Navy operated a small number before standardizing on the Dewoitine D.1

Kingdom of Italy

- Corpo Aeronautico Militare operated 175 examples built by Macchi and Caproni from 1924 until at least 1931. These were flown by the 76, 84, 91st Squadriglias of the 7th Gruppo, 70, 74 and 75th Squadriglias of the 23rd Gruppo of the 1st Stormo Caccia and the 92nd Squadriglia 8th Gruppo.

Japan

- Imperial Japanese Army operated 608 Nakajima-built Ko.4 (Nieuport Fighter type 4) from 1923 until 1937 or later in the 1, 3, 4, 7 and 8 Hiko Rentai (Air Regiments). One pattern aircraft was purchased from France

Spain

- Spanish Air Force operated 30 examples from 1923 until replaced with Nieuport-Delage NiD 52s in 1931

Manchukuo
Manchukuo Air Force operated a single ex-Manchurian and ex-Japanese Ko 4 when formed in 1937.
Sweden

- Swedish Air Force operated 10 examples designated as Jaktflygplan 2 (Fighter Type 2) from 1925 by Flygflottilj F.3 (3rd Wing) and F.5.

Siam/Thailand

- Royal Siamese Air Service and Royal Thai Air Force operated 52 as บ.ข.๔ (B.Kh4 or fighter type 4) from 1923, 40 of which were built in Siam. Some examples remained in service after the country became Thailand.

== Survivor ==
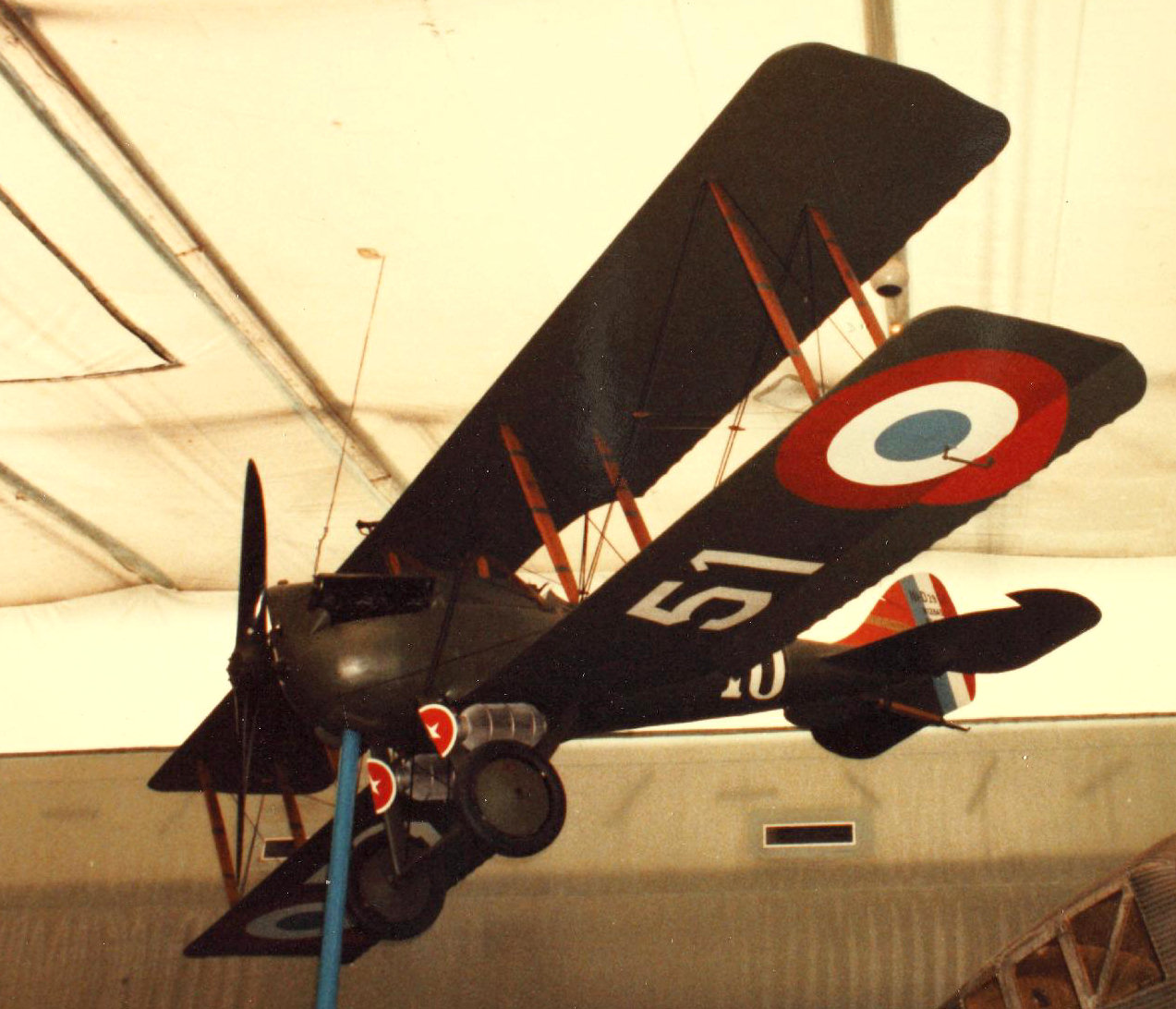
Nieuport-Delage NiD.29 fighter at the Musée de l'Air et de l'Espace in Paris

A single example survives at the Musée de l'Air et de l'Espace in Paris although it is not presently on display.

== Specifications (NiD 29) ==
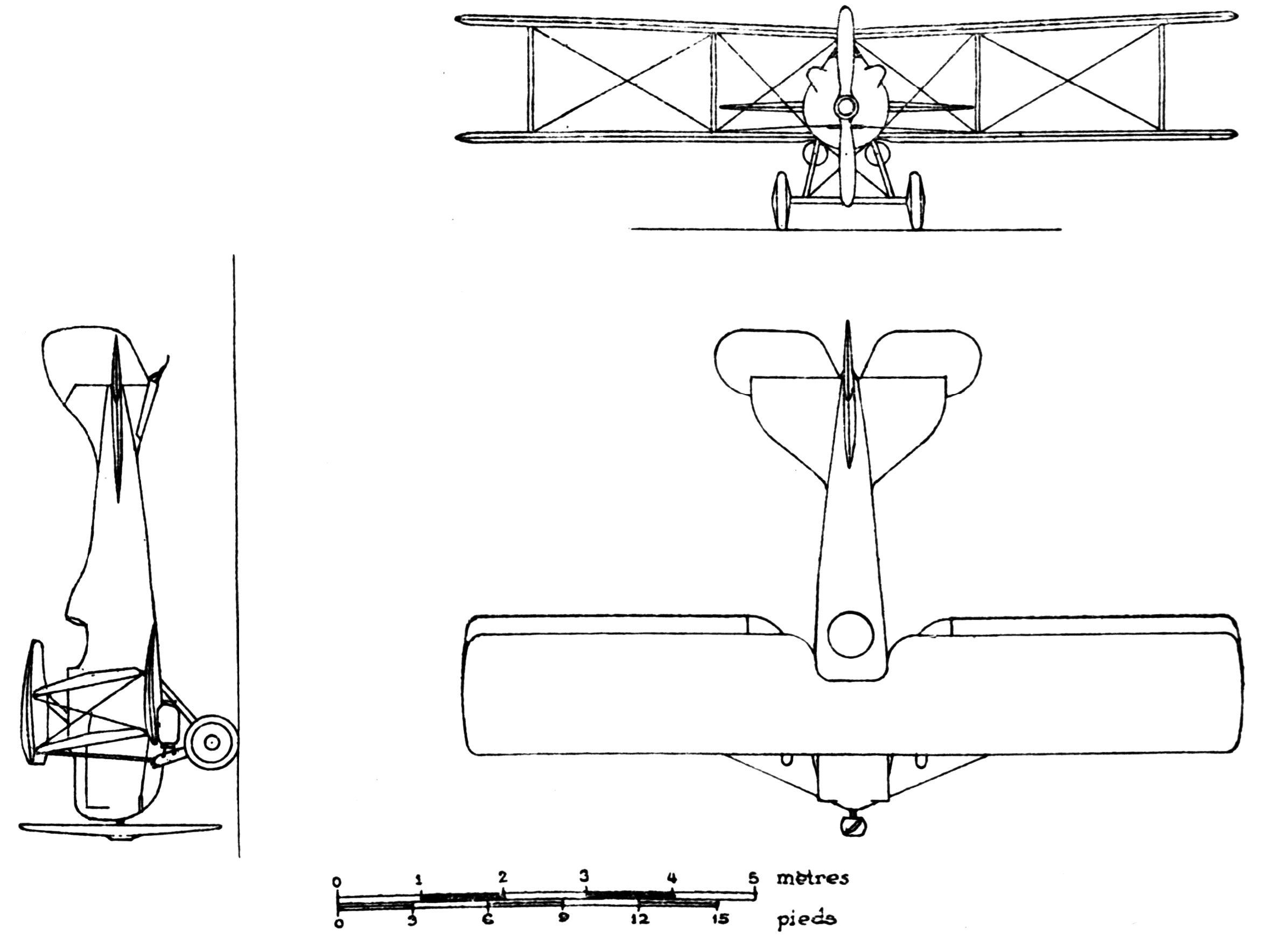
Nieuport-Delage NiD.29 C.1 3-view drawing from L'Aéronautique June,1926

Data from The Illustrated Encyclopedia of Aircraft

General characteristics

- Crew: 1
- Length: 6.49 m (21 ft 4 in)
- Wingspan: 9.70 m (31 ft 10 in)
- Height: 2.56 m (8 ft 5 in)
- Wing area: 26.70 m^{2} (287.4 sq ft)
- Empty weight: 760 kg (1,676 lb)
- Gross weight: 1,150 kg (2,535 lb)
- Powerplant: 1 × Hispano-Suiza 8Fb V-8 piston engine , 224 kW (300 hp)

Performance

- Maximum speed: 235 km/h (146 mph, 127 kn)
- Range: 580 km (360 mi, 310 nmi)
- Service ceiling: 8,500 m (27,900 ft)
- Rate of climb: 6.06 m/s (1,193 ft/min)

Armament

- 2 × fixed forward-firing 7.7 mm (0.303 in) Vickers machine guns

== See also ==
- 1918 in aviation
- Schneider Trophy

Related lists

- List of Interwar military aircraft
