= Avia BH-22 =

BH-22
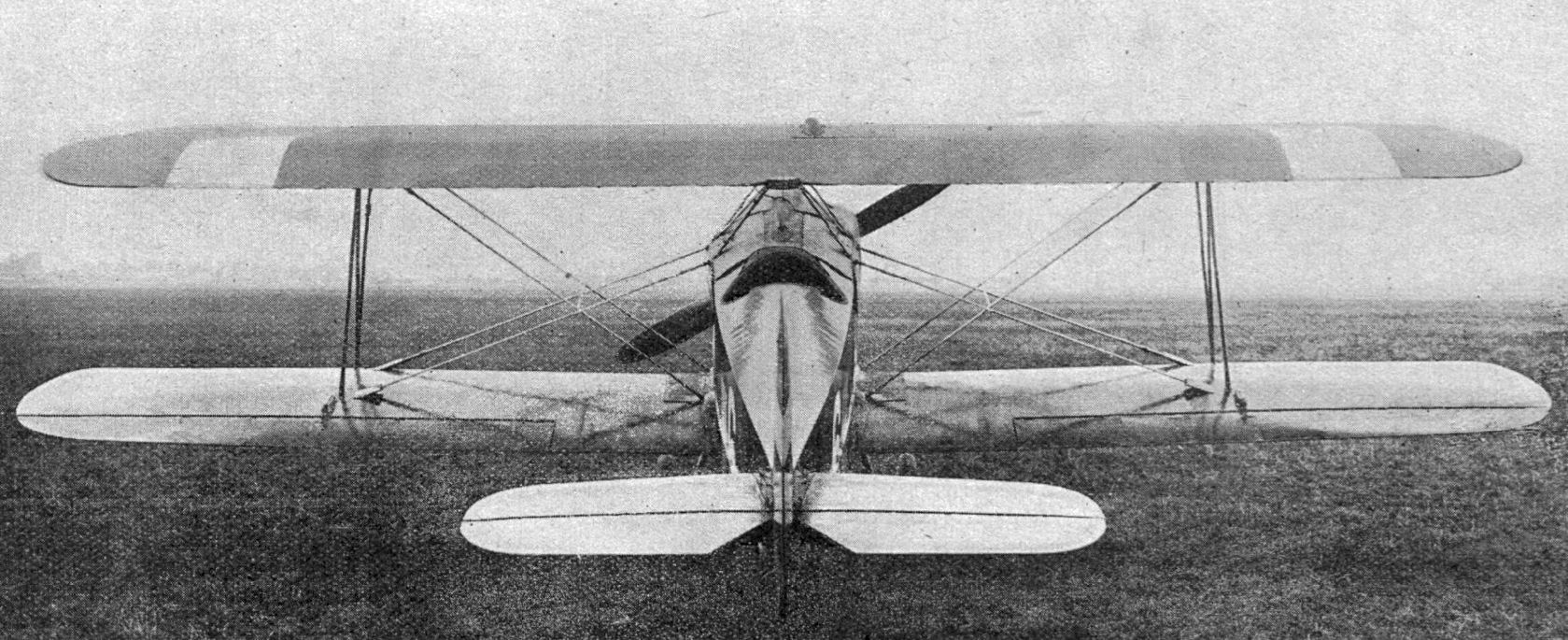

General information
- Type: Military trainer
- Manufacturer: Avia
- Designer: Pavel Beneš and Miroslav Hajn
- Number built: 30

History
- First flight: 30 July 1926

The Avia BH-22 was a trainer aircraft built in Czechoslovakia in 1925, based on the BH-21 fighter. A smaller engine was used and armament removed. The lighter engine required the wing stagger to be decreased. No significant modifications were made to the airframe structure, reduced weight further increasing the ultimate load factor (the BH-21 was designed to 12.5g). Some aeroplanes carried a camera gun. The type saw long service as a special aerobatic trainer and eventually several examples found their way into Czechoslovakia's aero clubs.

== Specifications ==
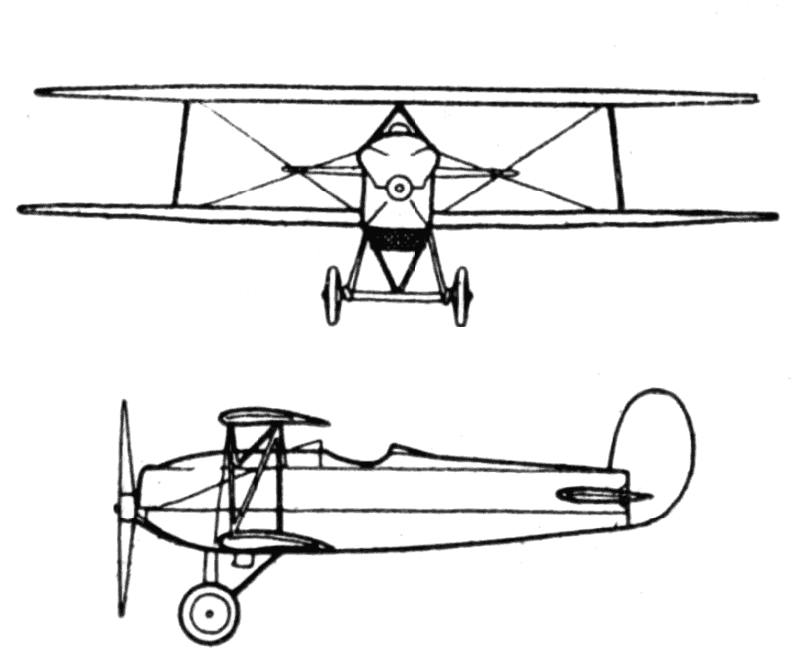
Avia BH-22 2-view drawing from L'Aéronautique July,1927

General characteristics

- Crew: one pilot
- Length: 6.87 m (22 ft 6 in)
- Wingspan: 8.90 m (29 ft 2 in)
- Wing area: 22.0 m^{2} (237 sq ft)
- Empty weight: 686 kg (1,512 lb)
- Gross weight: 860 kg (1,896 lb)
- Powerplant: 1 × Skoda-built Hispano-Suiza 8Aa , 134 kW (180 hp)

Performance

- Maximum speed: 216 km/h (134 mph, 116 kn)
- Service ceiling: 6,200 m (20,341 ft)
- Rate of climb: 3.8 m/s (745 ft/min)

== See also ==
Related development

- BH-17
- BH-21
- BH-23
- BH-33
