= Engine gun =

Aircraft gun mounting position

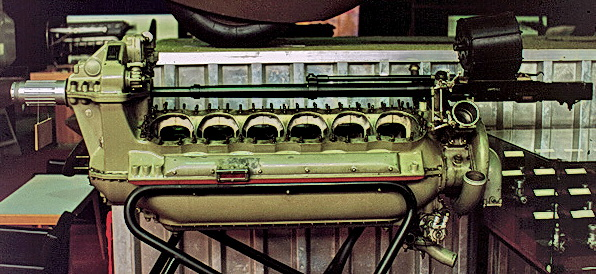
French Hispano-Suiza 12Y aircraft engine (cylinders removed) with Hispano-Suiza HS.404 engine gun mounted

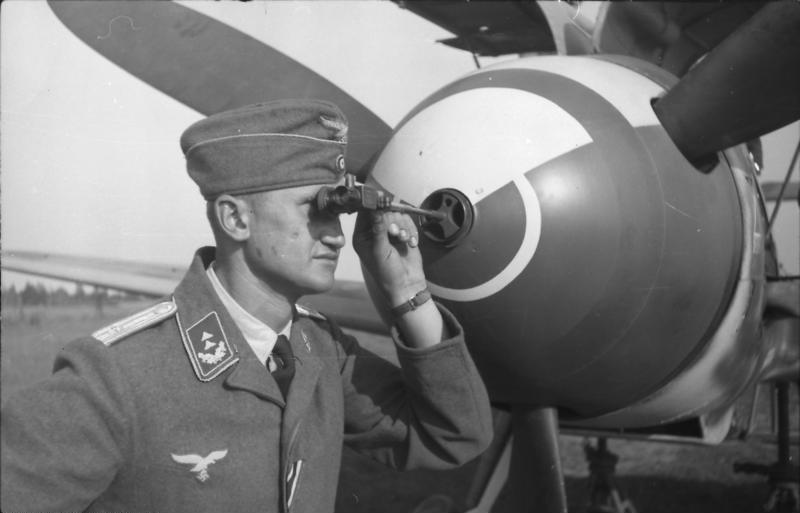
Luftwaffe soldier inspects the engine gun alignment of a Bf 109 fighter aircraft

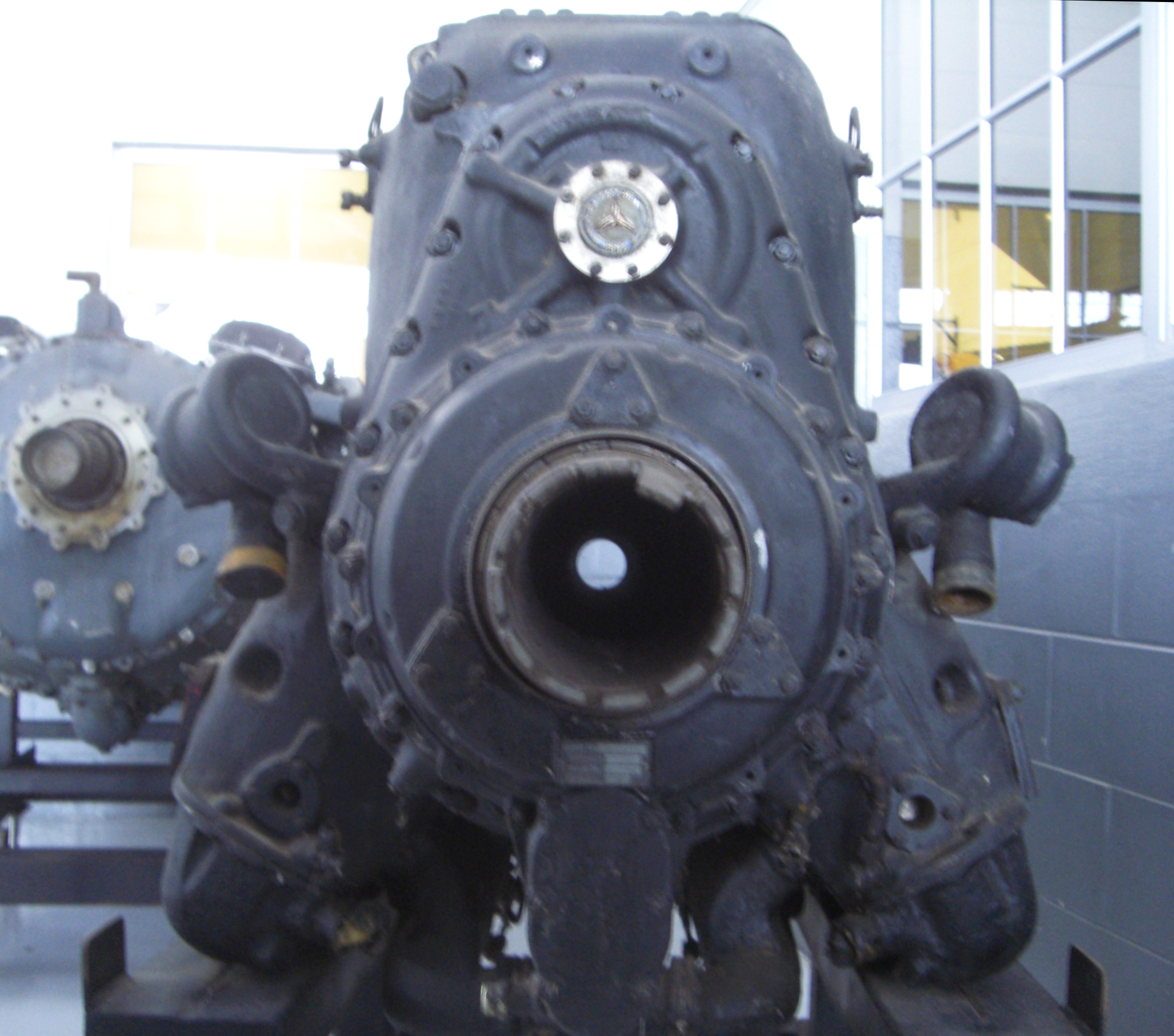
Firing channel on a Daimler-Benz DB 605 for an engine gun.

An engine gun, or engine cannon (from German: Motorkanone, "motor cannon"), is an aircraft gun mounted behind and through the cylinder block of an inline aircraft engine (most often a V engine) with a reduction drive that displaces the propeller axle to be in line with the gun so that gunfire is allowed through the propeller hub. This allows for nose-mounted weaponry on aircraft without the need for synchronization gear while also permitting higher calibers for nose-mounted weaponry, which otherwise would be hard to adapt for synchronization gear.

The first time this was done was during World War I when the French modified the Hispano-Suiza 8 engine to be able to install a 37 mm autocannon. The concept was used widely before the Jet Age.

== Historical engine guns ==
=== Finnish guns ===
- 12.7 mm VKT 12,70 LKk/42 (single use on a Morane-Saulnier MS.406)

=== French guns ===
- 7.5 mm MAC 1934
- 20 mm Hispano-Suiza HS.404
- 37 mm SAMC (Semi Automatique Moteur Canon)

=== German guns ===
- 7.9 mm MG 17 machine gun
- 20 mm MG 151 cannon
- 30 mm MK 103 cannon
- 30 mm MK 108 cannon

=== Soviet guns ===
- 12.7 mm Berezin UB
- 20 mm Berezin B-20
- 20 mm ShVAK cannon
- 23 mm Nudelman-Suranov NS-23
- 37 mm Nudelman-Suranov NS-37
- 37 mm Nudelman N-37
- 45 mm Nudelman-Suranov NS-45

=== Swiss guns ===
- 20 mm Oerlikon FF

== Engine gun installations ==
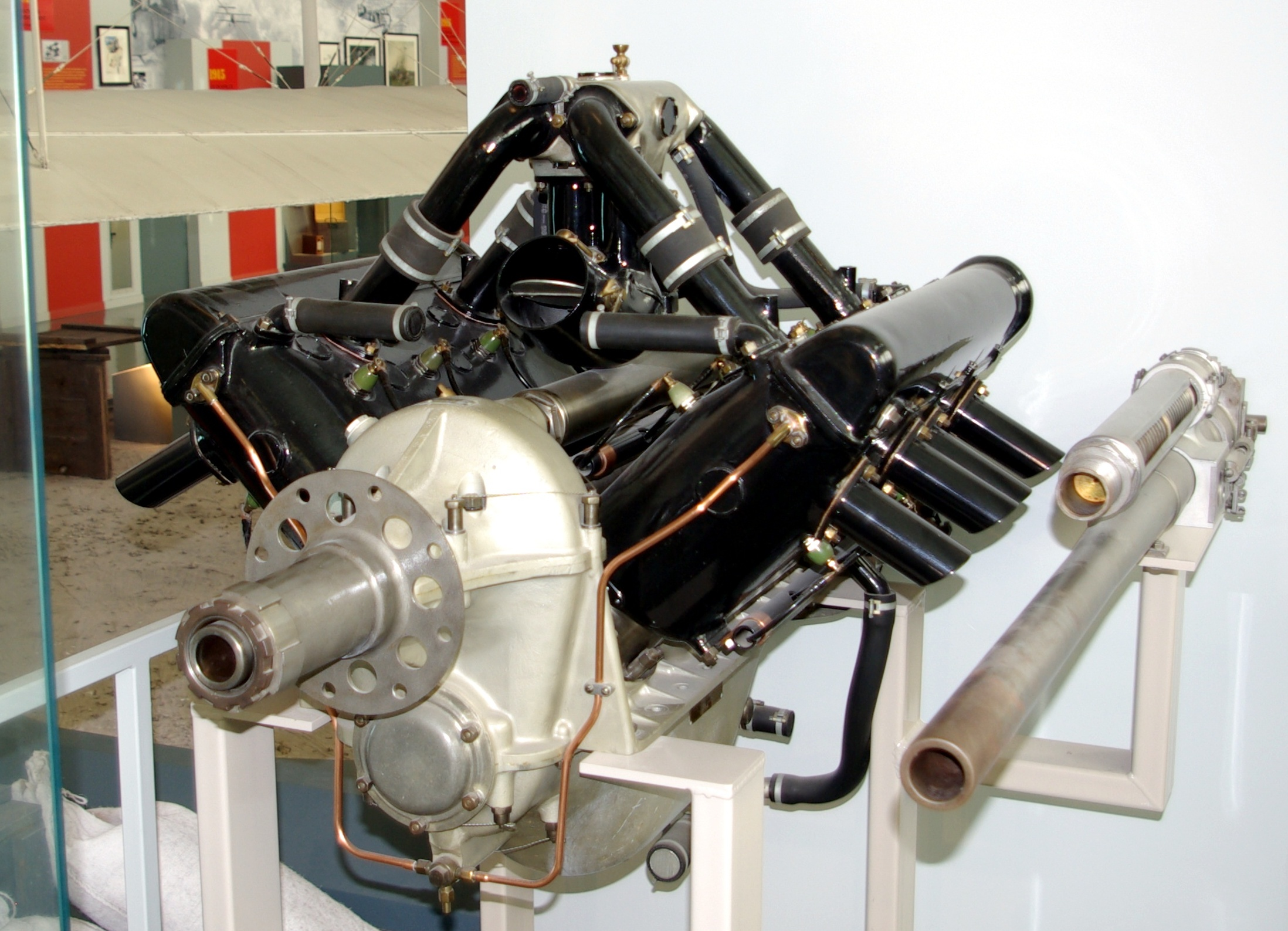
A geared-output shaft HS 8C engine for a SPAD S.XII WWI aircraft, showing the elevated intake manifold to clear the 37 mm cannon (shown to the right) mounted in the "V" between the cylinder banks.

=== French engines ===
- Hispano-Suiza 8 (various models)
- Hispano-Suiza 12Y

=== German engines ===
- Daimler-Benz DB 603
- Daimler-Benz DB 605

=== Soviet engines ===
- Klimov M-105
- Klimov VK-106
- Klimov VK-107

=== Swiss engines ===
- Saurer YS-2
- Saurer YS-3

== Aircraft with engine guns ==
=== Czechoslovak aircraft ===
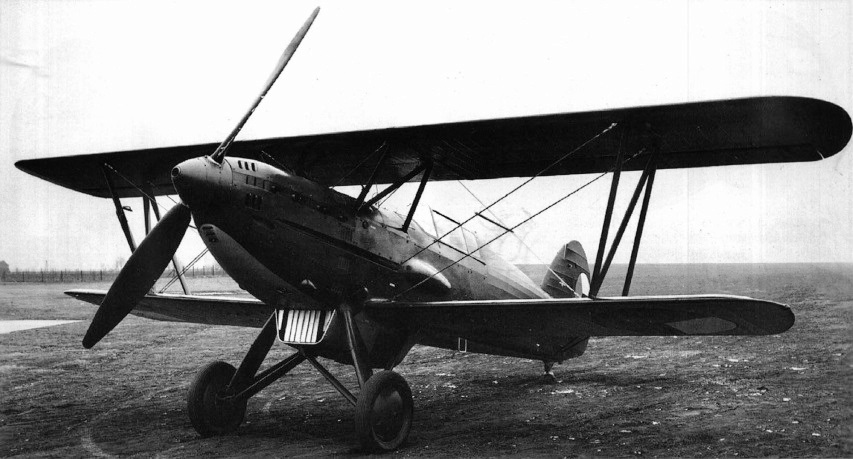
Czechoslovak Avia Bk-534, a biplane with a 20 mm engine gun

- Avia Bk-534
- Avia B-135

=== Finnish aircraft ===
- Mörkö Morane

=== French aircraft ===
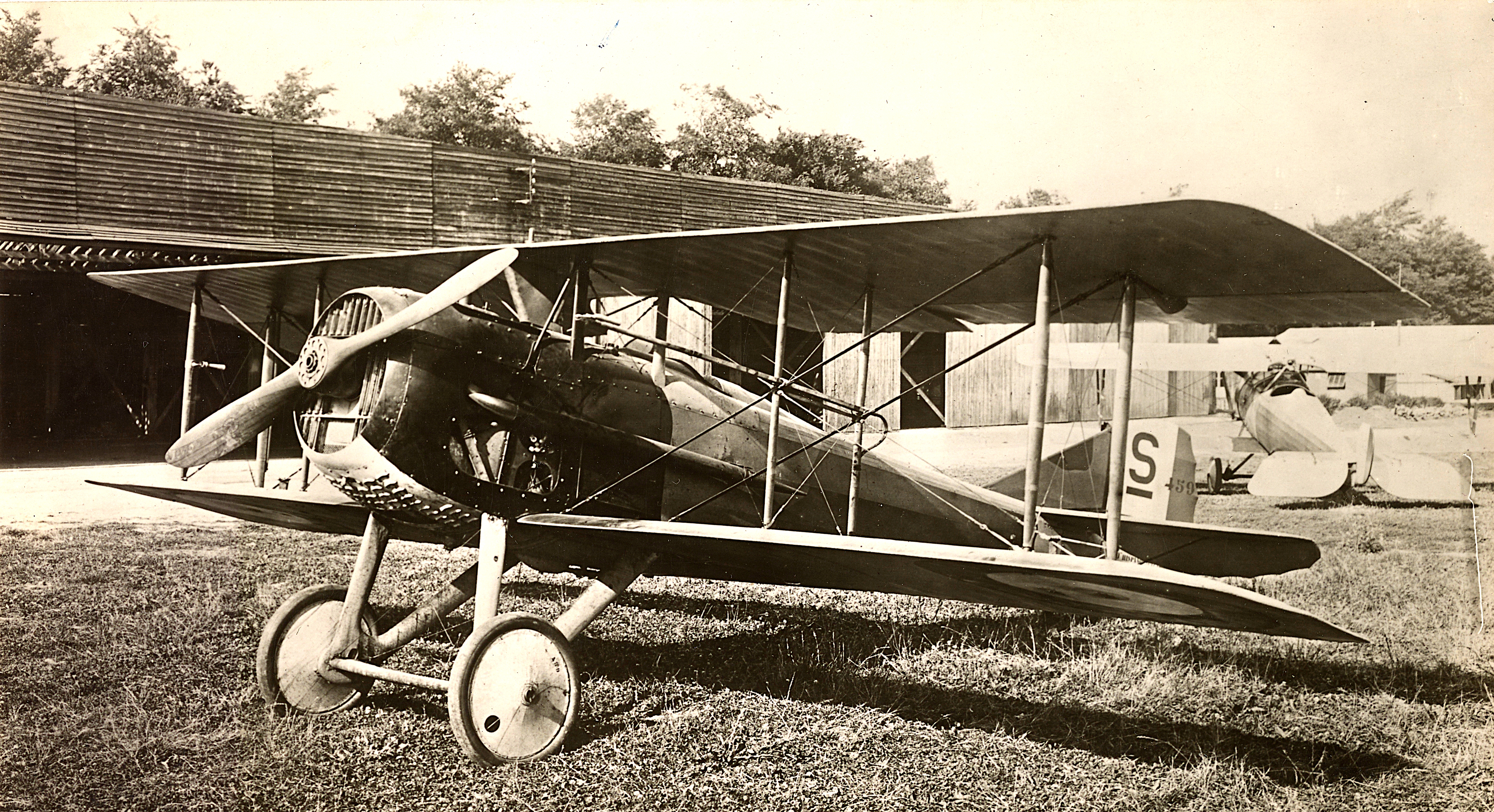
French SPAD S.XII, a World War I aircraft with a 37 mm engine gun

- Dewoitine D.500
- Dewoitine D.520
- Loire-Nieuport LN.401
- Morane-Saulnier M.S.405
- Morane-Saulnier M.S.406
- Morane-Saulnier M.S.410
- Morane-Saulnier M.S.411
- Morane-Saulnier M.S.412
- Morane-Saulnier M.S.450
- SPAD S.XII

=== German aircraft ===
- Blohm & Voss BV 155
- Dornier Do 335
- Heinkel He 100
- Heinkel He 112 ("kanonenvogel")
- Messerschmitt Bf 109
- Focke-Wulf Fw 190 (D-12, D-13 Variants)
- Focke-Wulf Ta 152

=== Italian aircraft ===
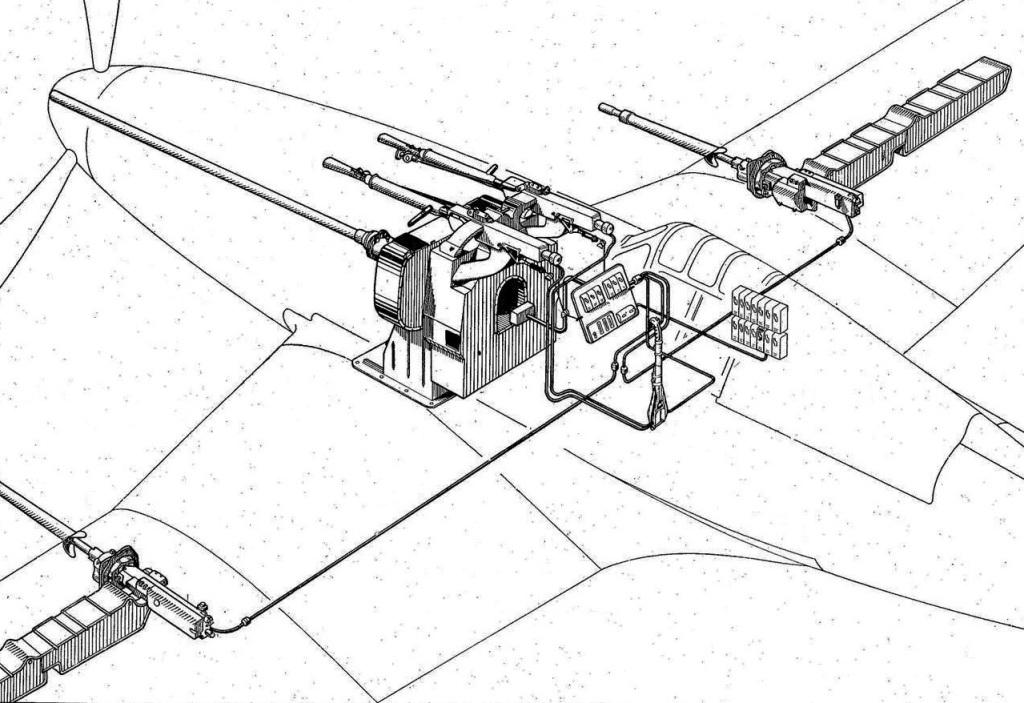
Fiat G.55 Centauro with engine gun (MG 151/20)

- Fiat G.55 Centauro
- Fiat G.56
- Macchi C.205 Veltro
- Reggiane Re.2005 Sagittario
- Savoia-Marchetti SM.92

=== Soviet aircraft ===
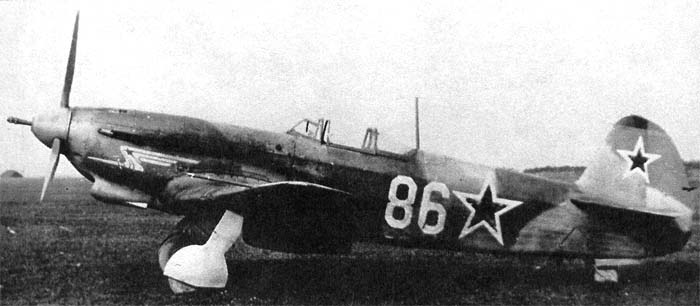
Yakovlev Yak-9K with the 45 mm Nudelman-Suranov NS-45 engine gun mounted

- Lavochkin-Gorbunov-Gudkov LaGG-3
- Yakovlev Yak-1
- Yakovlev Yak-3
- Yakovlev Yak-7
- Yakovlev Yak-9

=== Swedish aircraft ===
- SAAB 23

=== Swiss aircraft ===
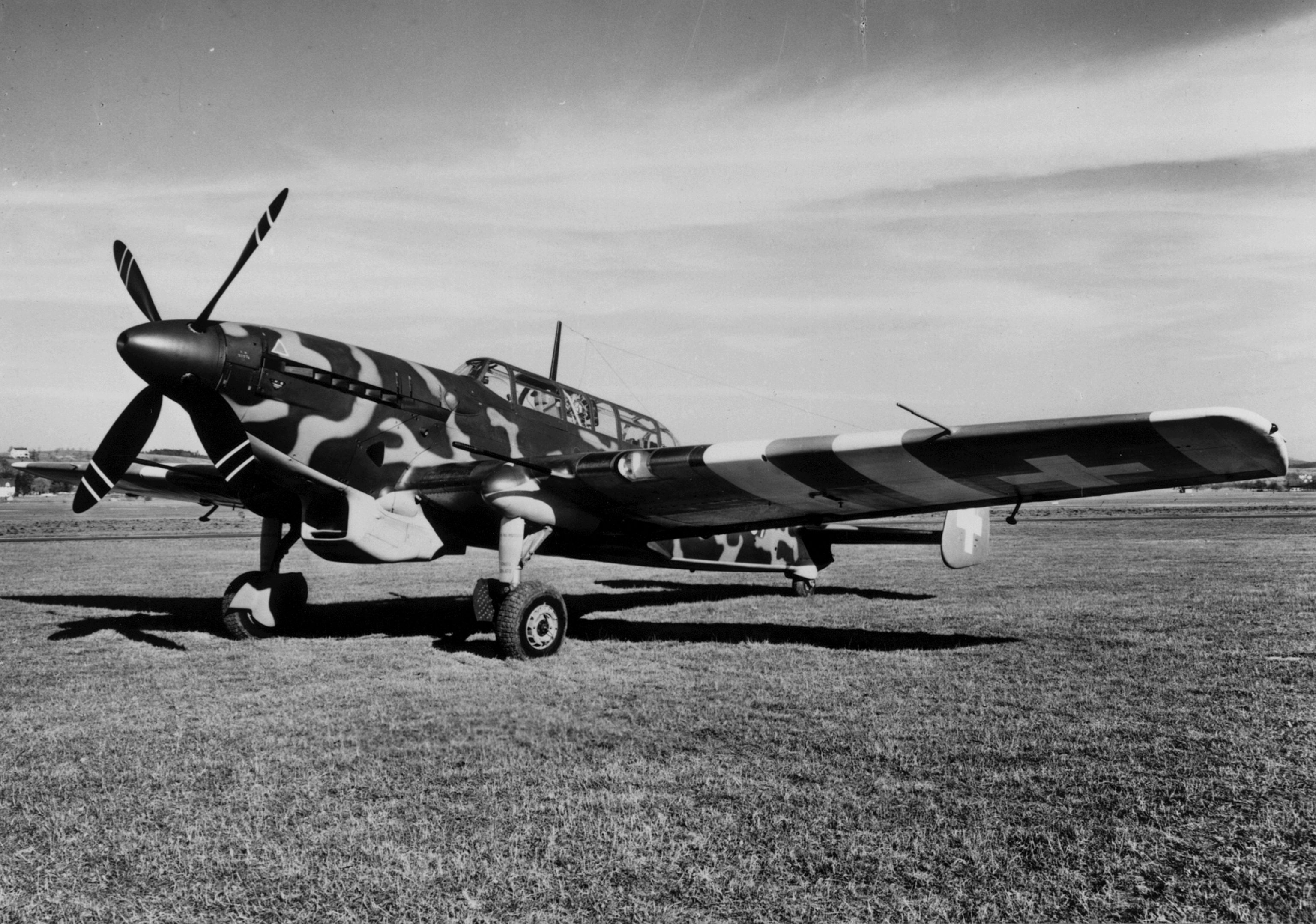
Swiss EKW C-3604, an attacker with a 20 mm engine gun

- C-35
- C-3603
- C-3604
- D-3800
- D-3801
- D-3802
- D-3803

=== Yugoslavian aircraft ===
- Ikarus S-49
- Rogožarski IK-3
