= Avia BH-33 =

Czechoslovak fighter aircraft

BH-33
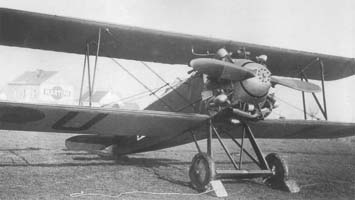

General information
- Type: Fighter
- Manufacturer: Avia, PWS (under licence), Ikarus (under licence)
- Designer: Miroslav Hajn and Pavel Beneš
- Primary users: Czechoslovak Air Force Polish Air Force; Yugoslav Royal Air Force

History
- Manufactured: Ca. 110, plus 50 licence-built in Poland and 22 in Yugoslavia
- First flight: 21 October 1927
- Developed from: Avia BH-21

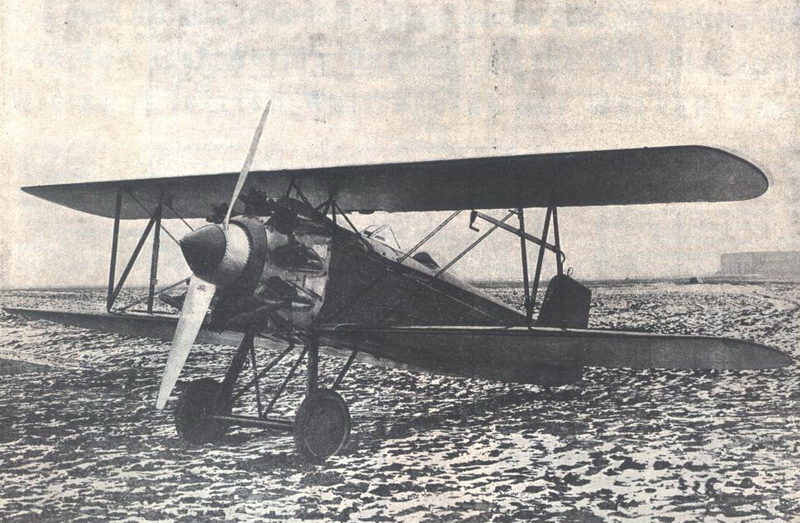
Avia BH-33 with engine Walter-Jupiter 480–600 HP

The Avia BH-33 was a biplane fighter aircraft built in Czechoslovakia in 1927. It was based on the BH-21J which demonstrated promising results by combining the original BH-21 airframe with a licence-built Bristol Jupiter radial engine. Other than the peculiar Avia hallmark of having an upper wing with a shorter span than the lower, it was utterly conventional, even featuring a tail fin for the first time in a Pavel Beneš and Miroslav Hajn design (previous aircraft had a rudder but no fin).

== Design and development ==
Initial tests of the first prototype were disappointing, displaying performance only marginally better than the BH-21, even when fitted with a more powerful version of the Jupiter. Two further prototypes followed, both designated BH-33-1, each with an increasingly powerful Jupiter variant – one a Jupiter VI, the other a Jupiter VII. The performance of the latter example was finally acceptable for the Czechoslovak defence ministry to order a small production run of only five aircraft.

Three examples were sold to Belgium, where there were plans to build the type under licence, but this did not occur. Licence production was undertaken, however, in Poland, where a single example was sold, along with a licence to build 50 aircraft. These were designated PWS-A and put into service with the Polish Air Force in 1930.

Development continued with an almost total redesign of the fuselage, replacing the wooden, slab-sided structure with one of oval cross-section, built up from welded steel tubes. Designated BH-33E, this was a world-class fighter for its time. Nevertheless, the response from the Czechoslovak military was lukewarm (although two were bought for the national aerobatics team), and Avia again looked abroad for customers, this time selling 20 aircraft to the Kingdom of Yugoslavia, along with a licence to produce another 24. Two or three examples were also bought by Soviet Union for evaluation.

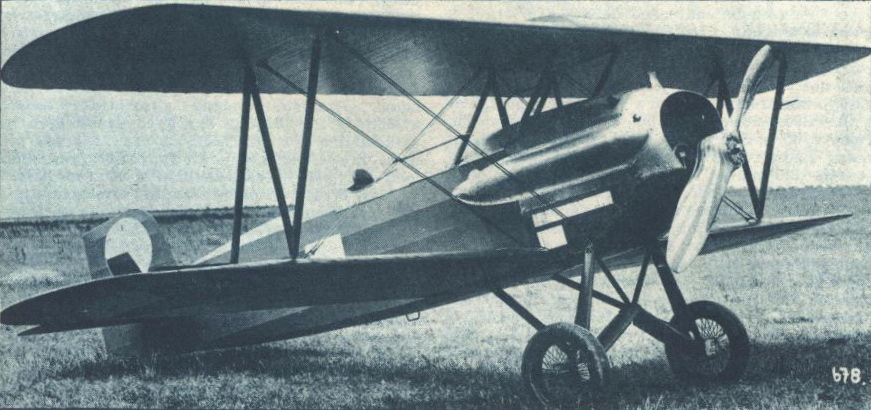
Avia BH-33L

In late 1929, a further development was flown as the BH-33L, featuring longer-span wings, and a Škoda L W-block engine. This version finally brought the company the domestic sales that it had been hoping for, with 80 aircraft ordered by the Czechoslovak Air Force. These became standard equipment with some air regiments up to the outbreak of World War II.

A single, final variant with a BMW-built Pratt & Whitney Hornet engine was built as the BH-33H (later redesignation BH-133) in 1930, but this did not lead to production.

== Operational history ==
Following the outbreak of the Spanish Civil War, a single BH-33 was covertly purchased in Belgium in August 1936 on behalf of the Spanish Republican Air Force. While it was delivered to Spain, the aircraft's machine guns had been removed when the aircraft and pilot was briefly detained in France before being released. The planes were used by Spanish Republican Air Force during Spanish-Civil War. Czechoslovak BH-33s never saw combat, and Poland's examples had long been replaced in service by the time of the German invasion. Two Yugoslavian machines did, however see combat against Luftwaffe Messerschmitt Bf 109s, but were both destroyed and their pilots killed.

== Variants ==
BH-33
First prototype.

BH-33-1

Two prototypes powered by Jupiter VI (second) and Jupiter VII (third) engines plus five serial built aircraft with Jupiter VII engine.
BH-33E
Rebuilt fuselage
BH-33E-SHS
Yugoslav Version powered by IAM K9 engine, 22 built.
BH-33L
Version with longer-span wings, powered by a Škoda L engine, 80 built.
BH-33H (BH-133)
Version powered by Pratt & Whitney Hornet engine, one built.
P.W.S.A
Polish license-built variant of the BH-33 with minor modifications, 50 built between 1929 and 1932.

== Operators ==
Belgium

- Belgian Air Force received three BH-33-1 aircraft.

Independent State of Croatia

- Air Force of the Independent State of Croatia

Czechoslovakia

- Czechoslovak Air Force
- Czechoslovak National Security Guard

Greece

- Hellenic Air Force acquired five Yugoslav-produced BH-33s, during the 1935 coup, when Greece was a republic.

Poland

- Polish Air Force received one BH-33 and 50 PWS-A license-built variant.

Slovakia

- Slovak Air Force (1939–1945)

Soviet Union

- Soviet Air Force bought two or three BH-33Es for tests.

Spanish Republic

- Spanish Republican Air Force

Yugoslavia

- Yugoslav Royal Air Force

== Specifications (BH-33L) ==
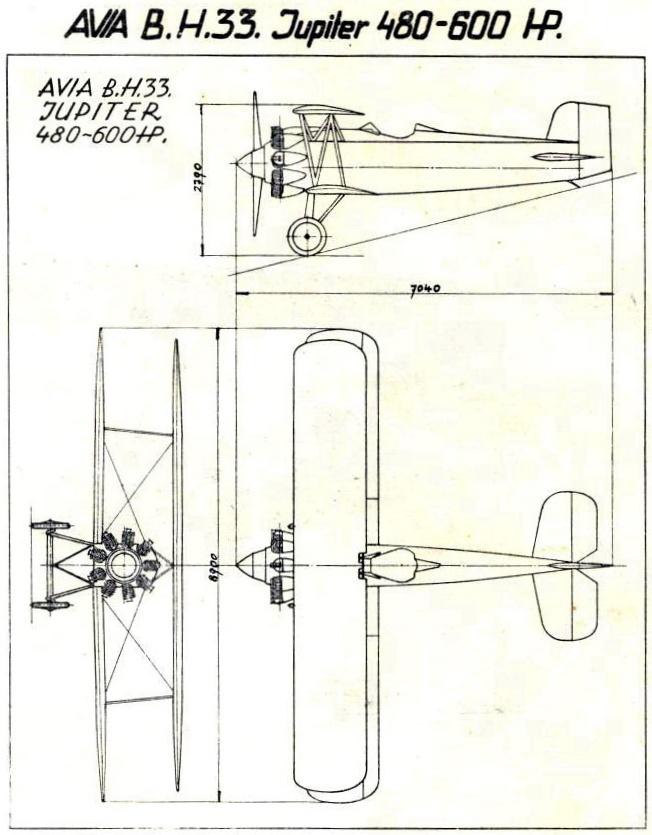
Avia BH-33

Data from Jane's all the World's Aircraft 1928, Combat aircraft of the world

General characteristics

- Crew: one, pilot
- Length: 7.22 m (23 ft 8 in)
- Wingspan: 8.90 m (29 ft 2 in)
- Height: 3.13 m (10 ft 3 in)
- Wing area: 25.5 m^{2} (274 sq ft)
- Empty weight: 1,117 kg (2,463 lb)
- Gross weight: 1,560 kg (3,439 lb)
- Powerplant: 1 × Škoda L , 430 kW (580 hp)

Performance

- Maximum speed: 298 km/h (186 mph, 162 kn)
- Cruise speed: 280 km/h (174 mph, 151 kn)
- Range: 450 km (280 mi, 240 nmi)
- Service ceiling: 8,000 m (26,247 ft)
- Rate of climb: 9.9 m/s (1,940 ft/min)

Armament

- 2 × fixed, forward-firing 7.7 mm (.303 in) Vickers machine guns
- 2 × fixed, forward-firing 7.92mm vz.28 machine gun

== See also ==
Related development

- BH-17
- BH-21
- BH-22
- BH-23

Related lists

- List of Interwar military aircraft
