= Hispano-Suiza 8 =

V-8 piston aircraft engine

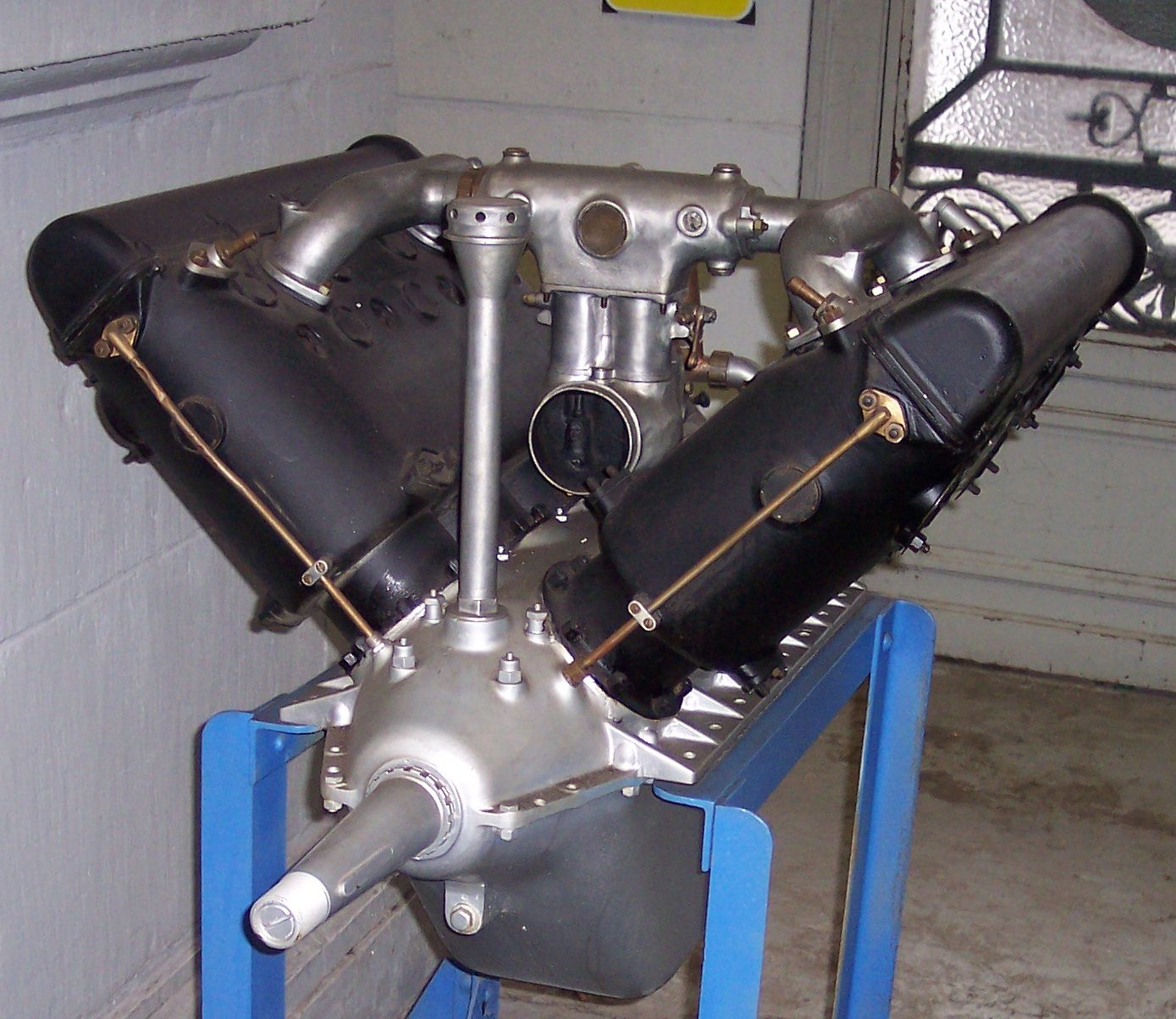
- Preserved "direct-drive" Hispano-Suiza 8
- Type: V8 piston engine
- Manufacturer: Hispano-Suiza
- First run: 1914
- Number built: 49,893 (World War I)
- Variants: Wolseley Viper

The Hispano-Suiza 8 is a water-cooled V8 SOHC aero engine introduced by Hispano-Suiza in 1914 that went on to become the most commonly used liquid-cooled engine in the aircraft of the Entente Powers during the First World War. The original Hispano-Suiza 8A was rated at 140 hp (100 kW) and the later, larger displacement Hispano-Suiza 8F reached 330 hp (250 kW).

Hispano-Suiza 8 engines, and variants produced by Hispano-Suiza and other companies under licence were built in twenty-one factories in Spain, France, Britain, Italy, and the U.S. Derivatives of the engine were also used abroad to power numerous aircraft types and the engine can be considered as the ancestor of another successful engine by the same designer, the Hispano-Suiza 12Y (and Soviet Klimov V12 derivative aero-engines) which was in service during the Second World War.

== Design and development ==
=== Origins ===
At the beginning of World War I, the production lines of the Barcelona based Hispano-Suiza automobile and engine company were switched to the production of war materiel. Chief engineer Marc Birkigt led work on an aircraft engine based on his successful V8 automobile engine. The resulting engine, called the Hispano-Suiza 8A (HS-31), made its first appearance in February 1915.

The first 8A kept the standard configuration of Birkigt's existing design: eight cylinders in 90° Vee configuration, a displacement of 11.76 litres (717.8 cu in) and a power output of 140 hp at 1,900 rpm. In spite of the similarities with the original design, the engine had been substantially refined. The crankshaft was machined from a solid piece of steel. The cylinder blocks were cast aluminium and of monobloc type that is, in one piece with the SOHC cylinder heads. The inlet and exhaust ports were cast into the blocks, the valve seats were in the top face of the steel cylinder liners, which were screwed into the blocks. Using a rotating bevel gear-driven tower shaft coming up from the crankcase along the rear end of each cylinder bank, with the final drive for each cylinder bank's camshaft accommodated within a semicircular bulge at the rear end of each valve cover. Aluminium parts were coated in vitreous enamel to reduce leakage. All parts subject to wear, and those critical for engine ignition were duplicated: spark plugs for dual ignition reliability, valve springs, magnetos, etc.

The new engine was presented to the French Ministry of War in February 1915, and tested for 15 hours at full power. This was standard procedure for a new engine design to be admitted into military service. However, because of lobbying by French engine manufacturers, the Spanish-made engine was ordered to undergo a bench test that no French-made engine had yet passed: a 50-hour run at full speed. The HS-31 was therefore sent back to Chalais-Meudon on July 21, 1915, and tested for 50 hours, succeeding against all expectations. The design also promised far more development-potential than rotary engines. This was despite being the most common type, then in use, for most aircraft.

French officials ordered production of the 8A to be started as soon as possible and issued a requirement for a new single-seat high-performance fighter aircraft using the new engine. The Louis Béchereau-designed SPAD VII was the result of this requirement and allowed the Allies to regain air superiority over the Germans.

== Production history ==
The Hispano-Suiza 8 was the most produced aero engine series of World War I with 49,893 units manufactured during the conflict. The engine continued to be built in smaller numbers during the 1920s. Most of the engines were built under license in factories located in France, the United Kingdom, the United States and Italy. Small numbers of engines were also built in Japan, Spain, Switzerland and the Soviet Union.

=== France ===
In total 35,189 Hispano-Suiza 8 engines were produced in France during World War I. Fourteen French companies produced the engines under license including Ariès, Brasier, Chenard-Walcker, De Dion-Bouton, Peugeot and Voisin. Peugeot were the single largest manufacturer of the 200 hp (150 kW) Hispano Suiza 8 with 5,506 engines built. The Hispano-Suiza 8 shared many common parts with the Peugeot 8Aa. Camshafts, piston rings and some bearings were interchangeable.

=== United States ===
In 1915 representatives from the Wright Company approached the French government to negotiate a license for the Hispano-Suiza 8 engine which was then under test. The French government refused to grant a license and instead offered the Peugeot 8Aa as an alternative. Ultimately the Wright company negotiated a license directly with Hispano-Suiza in Barcelona. The Wright company went on to produce 8,976 Hispano-Suiza engines during World War I.

=== United Kingdom ===
The first British orders for the Hispano-Suiza 8 engines were placed in August 1915, shortly before the first order from the French government. Production in the United Kingdom was handled by Wolseley Motors who produced modified versions as the Viper. A total of 3,050 engines were built in the United Kingdom during World War I.

=== Italy ===
SCAT, Itala and Nagliati all took out licenses for production of the Hispano-Suiza 8. Italian production of the engines during World War I numbered 2,566 units. Most of the Italian built engines were fitted to SPAD S.VIIs and SPAD S.XIIIs imported from France.

=== Czechoslovakia ===
In 1922, Škoda obtained a license for the 300 hp variant which they produced throughout the 1920s.

=== Japan ===
In 1918, Mitsubishi acquired a production license from Hispano-Suiza.

=== Spain ===
During World War I, 112 Hispano-Suiza 8 engines were built by La Hispano-Suiza in Barcelona.

=== Switzerland ===
In 1917, Sauer reverse engineered a 150 hp Hispano-Suiza engine. The Swiss engines were initially unlicensed copies however after World War I Sauer negotiated a license with Hispano-Suiza.

=== USSR ===
Between 1920 and 1922 the Soviets license built 36 examples of the 220 hp Hispano-Suiza 8 model. From 1921, the Soviets designated the 220 hp model as the M-4. Other aero engines added retrospectively to the Soviet's designation system included the RBVZ-6 (M-1), the Rhône 9J (M-2) and the Renault 12F (M-3). The Soviets also built 331 examples of the 300 hp Hispano-Suiza 8Fb variant as the M-6. The M-6 was in production from 1925 to 1932. It powered the T-24 tank.

== Variants ==
Some data from: British Piston Engines and their Aircraft

Note: Hispano-Suiza company type numbers were prefixed by HS- or written in full as Hispano-Suiza Type 31, but military designations used the conventional system of Hispano-Suiza(engine manufacturer) 8(no of cylinders) A(engine series) b(variant) r(attribute), thus Hispano-Suiza 8Abr.

8A (HS-31)
100 kW (140 hp), initial production and test engines, with few applications, including early Nieuport 14s.

8Aa (HS-31)
110 kW (150 hp) at 2000 rpm, entered production in July 1915. Early HS-8A engines were plagued with various problems which required further work and was the standard powerplant for early-production SPAD VIIs and the Curtiss "Jenny" JN-4H variants. The demand for the Hispano-Suiza engine was such that other manufacturers began producing it under licence, in France, Great Britain (Wolseley Adder), Italy (Nagliati in Florence and Itala/SCAT in Turin) and Russia. Total production of the HS-8Aa amounted to some 6,000 engines.

8Ab (HS-34)
130 kW (180 hp) at 2,100 rpm, increasing the compression ratio from 4.7 to 5.3, Birkigt was able to increase the power output . The 8Ab began replacing the 8Aa on SPAD VIIs in early 1917.

8Ac

8Ad
(1929) 120 mm × 130 mm (4.7 in × 5.1 in) bore x stroke, 160 kW (210 hp) for take-off.

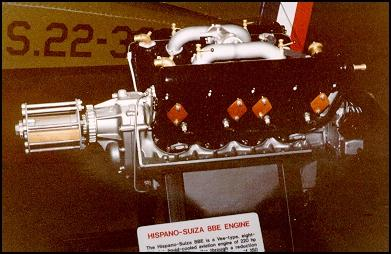
Hispano-Suiza 8Be

8B (HS-35)
150 kW (200 hp), compression ratio 5.3:1, geared at 0.75:1. The HS-36 was the 8B with a Lewis gun firing through the propeller boss.

8B twin (HS-39)
Coupled 8B engines

8Ba
150 kW (200 hp) at 2,300 rpm, low compression ratio of 4.7:1, spur geared at 0.585:1.

8Bb
150 kW (200 hp), compression ratio of 4.8:1, reduction gear 0.75:1. However the reduction gear system was fragile, and often broke down, sometimes with spectacular results ending up with the entire propeller, driveshaft and driven gear parting company from the airframe. Progressive refinement of the engine brought the available power to 175 kW (235 hp) by the end of 1917.

The 8B, 8Ba and 8Bb were used (a) to power the earliest versions of the S.E.5a, (b) along with the 8Bd, the SPAD S.XIII, (c) front-line active versions of the Sopwith Dolphin, and (d) several other Allied aircraft types, with its gear reduction easily identifiable in vintage World War I photos, from its use of a clockwise (viewed from in front, otherwise known as a left hand tractor) rotation propeller.

8Bc
160 kW (220 hp), compression ratio of 5.3:1, reduction gear 0.75:1.

8Bd
160 kW (220 hp), compression ratio of 5.3:1, reduction gear 0.75:1.

8Bda

8Be
160 kW (220 hp), compression ratio of 5.3:1, reduction gear 0.75:1.

8BeC (HS-38)
The 8Be fitted with the 37 mm (1.457 in) SAMC Model 37 cannon, or a similar weapon, as an engine gun firing through the propeller boss. A reduction gear equipped power-plant with a resultant clockwise rotation propeller like the 8B, produced 160 kW (220 hp) at 2,100 rpm. Two known weapons fitted were the SAMC with a rifled barrel and a smooth-bore cannon firing canister ammunition. The moteur-canon could fire a single shot at a time through the hollow drive shaft without propeller interference. This cannon mount required an "elevated" intake manifold design, bringing the intake "runners" straight off the inner surfaces of the cylinder banks to the updraft carburetor's plenum chamber. The engine was used on the SPAD S.XII.
8Ca/220
engine gun-equipped 168 kW (225 hp) at 2,100 rpm with 5.3:1 compression. Given the company designation HS Type 38
8Cb/180
engine gun-equipped 160 kW (220 hp) at 2,000 rpm with 4.7:1 compression. Given the company designation HS Type 44
8Cc/220
engine gun-equipped 160 kW (220 hp) at 2,100 rpm with 5.3:1 compression. Given the company designation HS Type 44

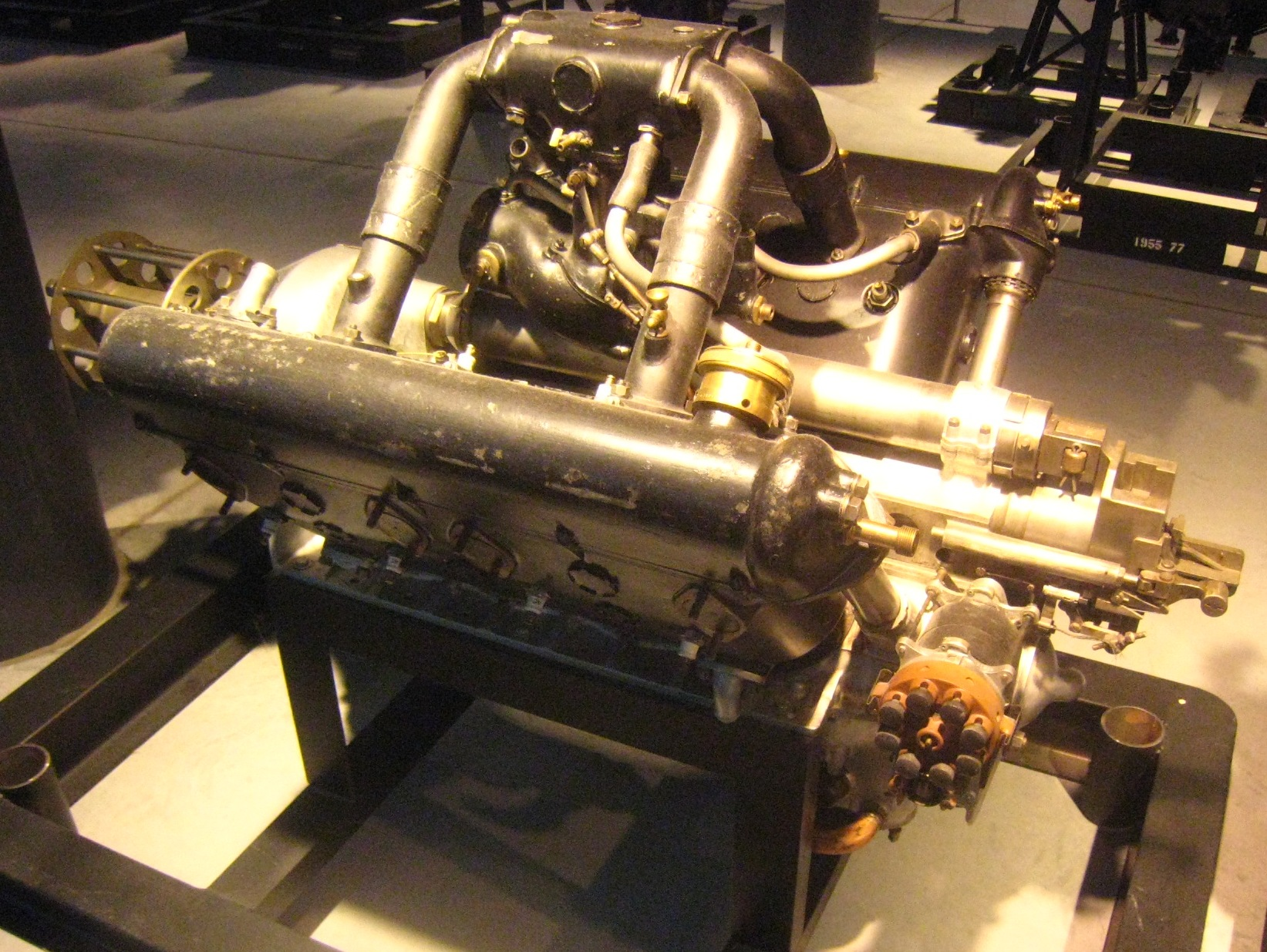
Hispano Suiza 8Ca. The large shafts that drove the valves are visible at the back of the cylinder banks.

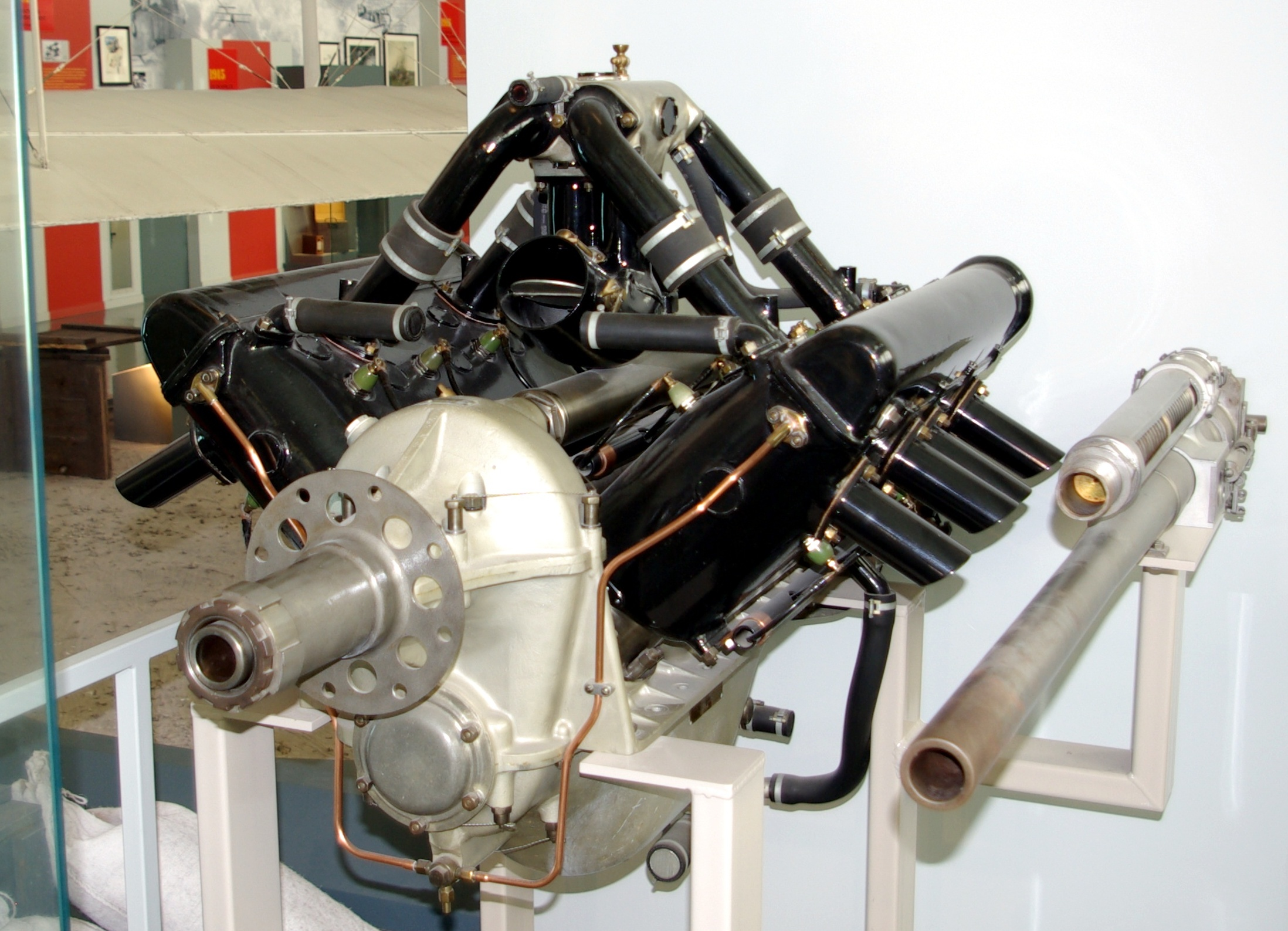
Hispano Suiza 8Ca

Hispano-Suiza Type 40
(8E ?)

Hispano-Suiza Type 41
(8A ?)
8F (HS-42)
220 kW (300 hp) at 2,100 rpm (eq. 750 lb·ft torque). The direct drive 8F was a bored out version of the 8B, intended for use in bombers, with a displacement of 18.5 L (1,128.94 cu in). Despite the increased weight of 564 lb (256 kg), the 8F was also installed in fighters such as the Nieuport-Delage NiD 29 and Martinsyde Buzzard, and would have powered the never-produced Mk.II version of the Sopwith Dolphin. Engine speed being lower than that of the HS-8B, the reduction gear was deleted, thereby increasing engine reliability.

8Fa
generally similar to the 8F.

8Fb
220 kW (300 hp), aka HS Type 42, compression ratio of 5.3:1, direct drive.

8Fd Special
For the CAMS 38 Schneider Trophy racer developing 280 kW (380 hp)

8Fe (HS-42VS)
(1926) 140 mm × 150 mm (5.5 in × 5.9 in) bore x stroke, 260 kW (350 hp) for take-off.

Wolseley W.4A Python I
110 kW (150 hp), compression ratio of 4.7:1. License production of the 8Aa at Wolseley Motors.

Wolseley W.4A Python II
130 kW (180 hp), compression ratio of 5.3 :1.

Wolseley W.4A Viper
150 kW (200 hp), compression ratio of 5.3 :1. Wolseley's engineers removed problems with the crankshaft and increased the compression ratio to give more power, with some early engines having a compression ratio of 5.6:1.

Wolseley W.4A Viper II
160 kW (210 hp) at 2,000 rpm.

Wolseley W.4B Adder I
150 kW (200 hp), compression ratio of 4.7 :1, reduction spur gear to 0.593:1.

Wolseley W.4B Adder II
150 kW (200 hp), compression ratio of 4.7 :1, reduction spur gear to 0.593:1. With stronger crankshaft webs.
Wolseley W.4B Adder III
150 kW (200 hp), compression ratio of 4.7 :1, reduction spur gear to 0.593:1. With balanced crankshafts.
Wright-Hisso A
Wright-Martin built Type 34/HS8Aa 150 hp (112 kW) at 1,400 rpm and 4.72:1 compression.
Wright-Hisso B
4-cyl in-line water-cooled 56 kW (75 hp) 120 mm × 130 mm (4.7 in × 5.1 in)
Wright-Hisso C
150 kW (200 hp) geared A
Wright-Hisso D
150 kW (200 hp) geared A with engine gun
Wright-Hisso E
130 kW (180 hp) at 1,700 rpm and 5.33:1 compression(HC 'I')
Wright-Hisso E-2
(HC 'E')
Wright-Hisso F
('D' without engine gun)
Wright-Hisso H
220 kW (300 hp), based on the Type 42/HS8F
Wright-Hisso H-2
improved 'H'
Wright-Hisso I
Wright-Hisso K
H with 37mm Baldwin engine gun
Wright-Hisso K-2
Wright-Hisso M
experimental 300 hp
Wright-Hisso T
Wright-Hisso 180 hp V-8
direct drive
Wright-Hisso 220 hp V-8
geared drive
Wright-Hisso 300 hp V-8
geared drive
Wright-Hisso 300 hp V-8
geared drive
Wright-Hisso V-720
M-4
220 hp (160 kW) Soviet produced 8Bb
M-6
300 hp (220 kW) Soviet produced 8Fb
Mitsubishi-Hispano-Suiza 300 hp engine
300 hp (220 kW) Imperial Japanese Army produced 8Fb

== Applications ==
- Austin-Ball A.F.B.1 (single prototype)
- Avia BH-21 (from 1925)
- Avia BH-22
- Bartel BM-5
- Bernard SIMB AB 10
- Blanchard Brd.1
- Caudron R.11 (8Bba)
- Caudron C.59
- Caudron C.61 (8Ac)
- Curtiss JN-4H Jenny (rare subvariant)
- De Bruyère C 1
- Descamps 27 (8Fb)
- Dewoitine D.1 (8Fb)
- Farman F.121 Jabiru (8Ac)
- FBA Type H (8Aa)
- Felixstowe F.1
- Fokker D.IX
- Fokker D.X (8Fb)
- Fokker D.XII (8F) initial design only
- Fokker S.III
- Gourdou-Leseurre GL.21
- Hanriot HD.5
- Hanriot HD.15
- Hanriot HD.20
- Itoh Emi 29
- Letord Let.1 (8A)
- Letord Let.2 & Let.3 (8Ba)
- Letov Š-7 (8Fb)
- Letov Š-13 (8Fb)
- Letov Š-14 (8Fb)
- Levasseur PL.1 (8Ab)
- Martinsyde F.4 Buzzard (8Fb)
- Nieuport 14 (8A)
- Nieuport-Delage NiD 29 (8Fb)
- Nieuport-Delage NiD 38 (8Ab)
- Nieuport-Delage Sesquiplan (8Fb)
- Royal Aircraft Factory S.E.5 (8Aa) and S.E.5a (8B, 8Ba or 8Bb on earliest versions and the Wolseley Viper derivative on later models)
- Sopwith Dolphin (8B)
- Sopwith B.1 prototypes (8Ba)
- SPAD S.VII (8A)
- SPAD S.XI (8Be)
- SPAD S.XII (8Cb)
- SPAD S.XIII (8Be)
- Standard J-1 (post-war modification)
- Waco DSO (8a)
- Wibault 1 (single prototype)

=== Wright-Hispano E ===
- Boeing NB-2
- AT-3
- Consolidated PT-1
- Cox-Klemin TW-2
- Curtiss AT-4
- Dayton-Wright TW-3
- Huff-Daland TW-5
- Loening M-8
- Naval Aircraft Factory TS-3
- Travel Air 3000
- Vought VE-7
- Waco DSO

=== Mitsubishi "Hi"shiki ===
200 HP (8B)

- Yokosuka Ro-go Ko-gata
- Hanza-shiki suijō teisatsuki (ハンザ式水上偵察機, Type Hansa Surveillance Floatplane)

300 HP (8F)

- Mitsubishi 1MF
- Mitsubishi 2MR

== Comparative table ==
Model	8A	8Aa	8Ab	8B	8F
Bore (mm)	120				140
Stroke (mm)	130				150
Displacement (l)	11.76				18.47
Compression ratio	4.7		5.3		
Length (m)	1.19	1.25	1.31	1.36	1.32
Width (m)	0.81	0.83	0.85	0.86	0.89
Height (m)	0.77	0.81	0.87	0.90	0.88
Weight(kg)	195	215	230	236	256
Power output (hp)	140	150	180	200/235	300
at (rpm)	1900	2000	2100	2300	2100

== Engines on display ==
- A Hispano-Suiza 8Aa Type 34, made in 1916, is on public display at Museo de Aeronáutica y Astronáutica at Madrid,

Spain.

- A Hispano-Suiza 8Ab, serial number 11934, is on public display at Vaasan Auto- ja moottorimuseo Vaasa Automobile and Motor Museum in Vaasa, Finland.
- A Wright-Hisso 8A is on public display at the Aerospace Museum of California.
- A Wright-Hisso 8A is on public display at the National Museum of the U.S. Air Force

== Specifications (Hispano-Suiza 8a) ==
=== General characteristics ===
- Type: 8-cylinder liquid-cooled Vee piston engine
- Bore: 120 mm (4.724 in)
- Stroke: 130 mm (5.118 in)
- Displacement: 11.76 L (717.77 in^{3})
- Dry weight: 202 kg (445 lb)

=== Components ===
- Valvetrain: SOHC (single overhead cam)
- Fuel system: 1 Claudel or Zenith updraft carburetor
- Cooling system: liquid

=== Performance ===
- Power output: 150 hp (112 kW) at 1,700 rpm
- Fuel consumption: 310 g/(kW•h) (0.51 lb/(hp•h))
- Oil consumption: 18.2 g/(kW•h) (0.03 lb/(hp•h))

== See also ==
Related development

- Harkness Hornet, a single bank of the Hispano-Suiza, on an Australian-made crankcase.
- Wolseley Viper

Comparable engines

- Peugeot 8Aa
- Sunbeam Arab

Related lists

- List of aircraft engines

== Bibliography ==
- "Los motores V8 de aviación de La Hispano Suiza (1914–1918)" by Jacinto García Barbero (Edited by Asociación de Amigos del Museo Del Aire, Museo de Aeronáutica y Astronáutica, CECAF. Depósito legal: M-41737-2005) 219 pages.
