= Avia BH-21 =

BH-21
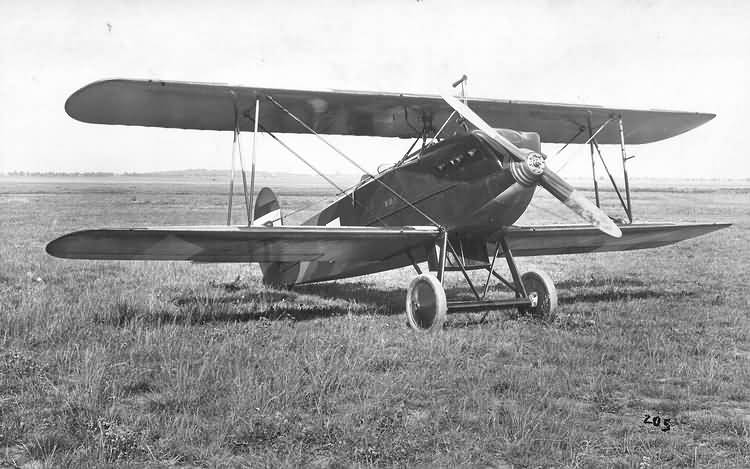

General information
- Type: Fighter
- Manufacturer: Avia
- Designer: Pavel Beneš and Miroslav Hajn
- Primary users: Czechoslovak Air Force Belgian Air Force
- Number built: 184

History
- First flight: January 1925

The Avia BH-21 was a fighter biplane designed and produced by the Czechoslovak aircraft manufacturer Avia. First flown in January 1925, it served an important role in securing Czechoslovak national security during the Interwar period.

It originated as the Avia BH-17 during the early 1920s, which was redesigned in response to feedback from an official evaluation of the aircraft as a fighter. Performing its maiden flight in January 1925, it was put into quantity production later that same year. It was operated by both the Czechoslovak Air Force and the Belgian Air Force. As well as being a competent fighter aircraft, it was also an accomplished racer, winning several air races in the mid-1920s.

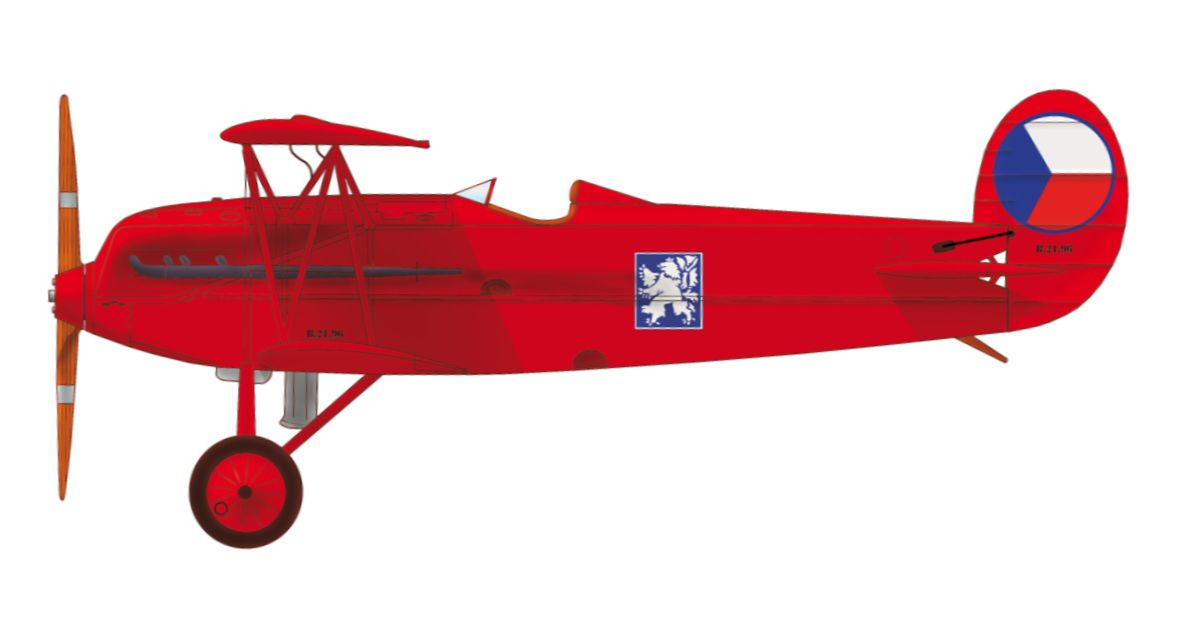
Avia B.21.96, nicknamed "Red devil", which flew Czechoslovak aerobatic flyer František Malkovský. He died in its cockpit after the crash in Karlovy Vary on 8 June 1930

== Development ==
The origins of the BH-21 can be traced back to the Avia BH-17, a conventional biplane designed by Pavel Beneš and Miroslav Hajn during the early 1920s as a response to a Czechoslovak Defense Department requirement for a new fighter aircraft. The BH-17 was one of three biplanes amongst the five Avia designs submitted to the Defense Department, along with competing designs from the Letov Kbely and Aero companies. After an extensive review, the BH-17 was selected, after which several aircraft were produced for evaluative purposes.

Flight testing of these early aircraft revealed some deficiencies in the BH-17, which motivated a prompt redesign of the aircraft in 1924. This redesign led to the aircraft being redesignated as the BH-21. Changes included straightened interplane bracing and allowed for a better field of view for the pilot. A dedicated training version, designated the BH-22, was also created. Both versions were powered by a Hispano-Suiza V8 engine; the BH-22 was fitted with the less powerful 180 HP version while the BH-21 had the 224 kW (300 hp) Hispano-Suiza 8fb, which was built under license by Škoda.

== Design ==
The Avia BH-21 was a capable fighter aircraft that possessed favourable performances across multiple categories. It could attain speeds of up to 250 km (155.3 mi.) while hauling a useful load of 310 kg (683.43 lb.) and flying in close proximity to the ground. In horizontal flight, the BH021 could maintain level flight at speeds as slow as 90 km (55.94 mi.) per hour; its landing speed is 70 km (43.51 mi.) per hour and it could take off within a distance of roughly 60 m (196.85 ft.). Steering was achieved via a double cable arrangement; the fuselage had inspection windows at various locations to permit the examination of these control cables.

The aircraft had a rectangular fuselage that was entirely covered with plywood, which permitted the omission of brace wires. The structure of fuselage consisted of four longerons, which were composed of wood, that connected to various wood uprights and cross bars. The front of the lower longerons was bent; both the lower and upper longerons formed the supports for the engine bed, which was entirely composed of wood. The pilot's cockpit was located directly behind the cell; it was relatively large and comfortable, featuring an adjustable seat and made provision for a dorsal parachute. Embedded into the rear portion of the fuselage was the horizontal stabilizer, which was held in place by two bolts. It had a wooden frame and was covered by plywood. The elevator comprised two unbalanced sections with wood frames and fabric covering. The rectangular fuselage terminated in a vertical ridge in place of a fin; accordingly, the vertical empennage was restricted to a slightly balanced rudder, which had a steel-tubing framework covered by fabric.

The wings were slightly staggered while the span of the upper wing was slightly less than that of the lower wing, an arrangement that increased the efficacy of the ailerons, which were attached to the lower wing, while the staggering increased the pilot's visibility both forward and upwards. The single-piece upper wing was supported in the middle by a cabane made up of streamlined steel tubes. The lower wing comprised two sections, each of which were directly attached to the lower longerons of the fuselage. The wings were braced on each side of the fuselage by N-shaped struts of streamlined steel tubing and two pairs of double cables. The brace wires were attached to the lower part of the fuselage and the upper wing, achieving a favourable distribution of stresses.

The wing structure consisted of two box-girder type spars with wooden ribs and plywood covering. These spars were relatively deep and were reinforced around the attachment points to the fuselage, the cabane struts, and the N-struts. The cross section of the wing spars was reduced in order to fit the rims at the wing tips. The leading edge was formed by the forward spar while the trailing edge by a piano wire. Numerous bars were present within the wings, both between the spars and in parallel to them; the ailerons were attached to one such bar. These ailerons were unbalanced, had a steel tube framework and a fabric covering; they were actuated via a system of tubular rods and levers. Each rib consisted of a plywood web and two double flanges. The leading edge was reinforced by false rib tips. As the plywood covering of the wings possessed sufficient rigidity, the wings lacked any interior bracing wires.

Typically, the powerplant was a single Hispano-Suiza 8Fb V-8 water-cooled piston engine, which was capable of producing up to 300 HP at 1,BOO rpm. This engine was entirely enclosed by a cowling composed of sheet aluminium. Cooling was accomplished by a honeycomb-style radiator, produced inhouse by Avia, that was located underneath the fuselage; it can be raised and lowered as required. Fuel was stored in a tank located in the bottom of the fuselage; a rubber covering was used to protect the tank against incendiary bullets. A pump was used to supply fuel from this tank to a gravity tank within the center of the upper wing above the cabane. The tanks were unusually light, being made of aluminium sheets joined together using a patented soldering process. Sufficient fuel could be carried for up to three hours of typical flying; aggressive use of the throttle shortened this time to two hours.

The undercarriage was composed of both wood and metal. The vertical struts, which had a gentle conical shape, comprised laminated wood with metal fittings at their bases for the shock absorbers; each fitting connected to the fuselage via an inclined steel tube. The shock absorber was made of rubber. A pair of V-shaped steel tubes were present to achieve lateral stability. The two semi-axles slid in openings in the vertical wood struts. The undercarriage had a track of 1.5 m (4.92 ft.). The tail skid consisted of a plate spring suspended in overhang. It had a standardised shape and, despite being designed to be long-lasting, was relatively ease to replace.

== Operational history ==
During 1925, quantity production of the BH-21 commenced, a total of one hundred and thirty-nine aircraft were produced for the Czechoslovak Air Force. In June 1925, it was successful in trials staged by the Belgian Air Force; this led to one aircraft being built for Belgium by Avia while another thirty-nine were produced under license by the Belgian company Société Anonyme Belge de Constructions Aéronautiques SABCA and five by the Société d'Etudes Général d'Aviation SEGA.

During its entire service life, the BH-21 never engaged in recorded combat incidence. The type was retired years prior to the outbreak of the Second World War. In spite of this, it served as an important stepping stone to more advanced aircraft, such as the BH-33 and B-34 types.

There were also two experimental variants: the BH-21J with Jupiter engine (predecessor of BH-33) and a race plane, the BH-21R, with a boosted HS-8Fb engine (298 kW/400 hp). The latter won several national air race competitions in 1925.

== Variants ==
- BH-21 : Single-seat fighter aircraft.
- BH-21J : One BH-21 fitted with a Bristol Jupiter radial piston engine. Led to the development of the Avia BH-33.
- Bh-21R : Single-seat clipped-wing racing aircraft.

== Operators ==
Belgium

- Belgian Air Force

Czechoslovakia

- Czechoslovak Air Force

== Specifications ==
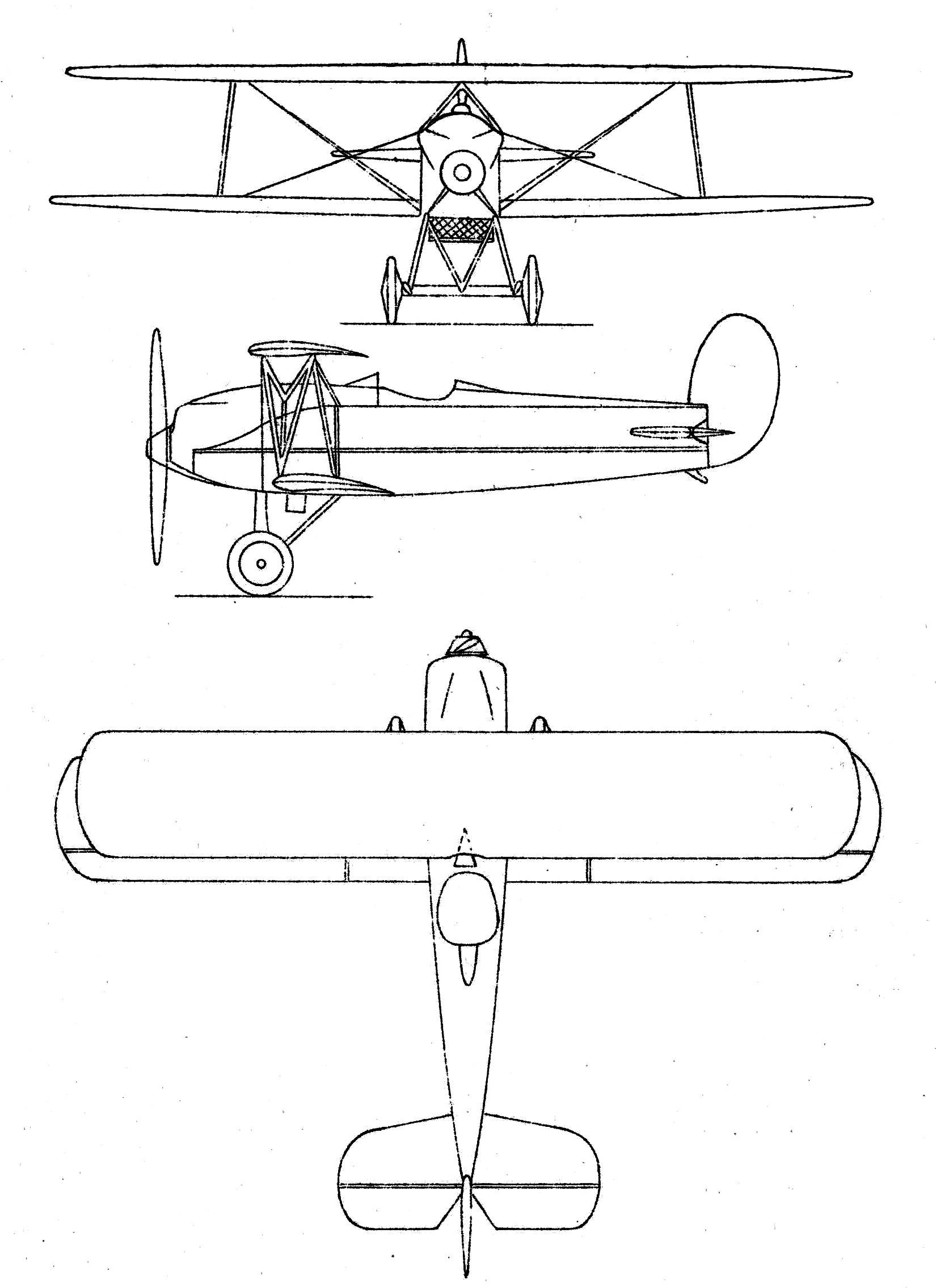
Avia BH-21 3-view drawing from NACA Aircraft Circular No.22

Data from Les Ailes, May 1925, National Advisory Committee for Aeronautics

General characteristics

- Crew: One
- Length: 6.87 m (22 ft 6 in)
- Wingspan: 8.90 m (29 ft 2 in) upper wing slightly less
- Height: 2.74 m (9 ft 0 in)
- Wing area: 22 m^{2} (240 sq ft)
- Empty weight: 765 kg (1,687 lb)
- Gross weight: 1,075 kg (2,370 lb)
- Fuel capacity: 140 kg (310 lb)
- Powerplant: 1 × Hispano-Suiza 8Fb V-8 water-cooled piston engine, 224 kW (300 hp) at 1,850rpm
- Propellers: 2-bladed

Performance

- Maximum speed: 245 km/h (152 mph, 132 kn) at 3000 m
- Stall speed: 90 km/h (56 mph, 49 kn)
- Range: 600–650 km (370–400 mi, 320–350 nmi)
- Service ceiling: 8,500 m (27,900 ft)
- Time to altitude: 5,000 m (16,000 ft) in 14 minutes 7,000 m (23,000 ft) in 35 minutes

Armament

- Guns: 2 × 7.7 mm (0.303 in) Vickers machine guns in the upper front fuselage.

== See also ==
Related development

- BH-17
- BH-22
- BH-23
- BH-33

Related lists

- List of interwar military aircraft
