= Nieuport Madon =

French WW1 fighter aircraft

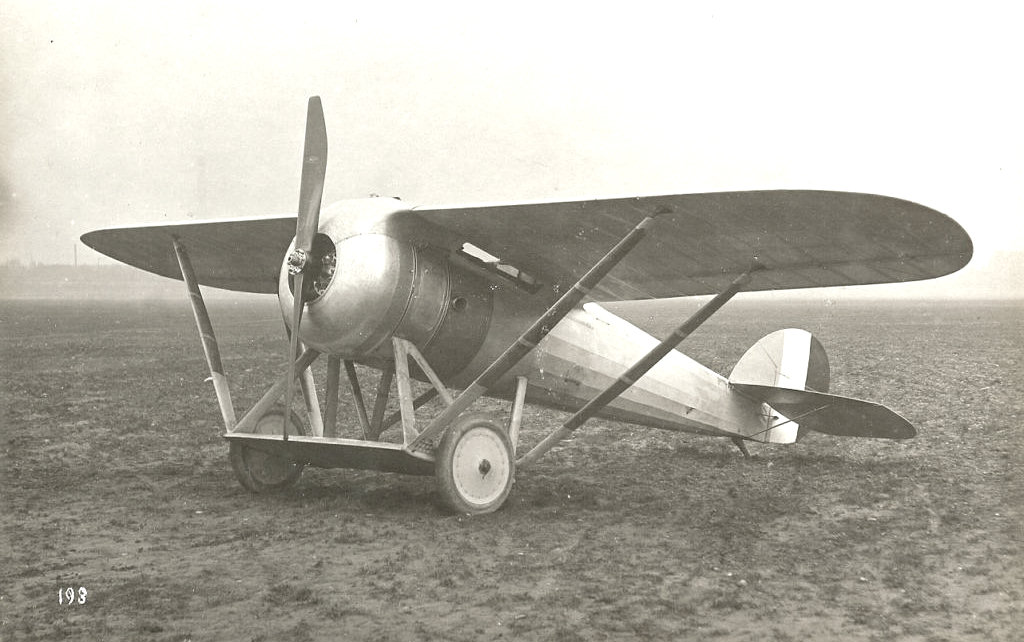
- Nieuport Madon prototype with wing root opening visible

General information
- Type: Fighter
- National origin: France
- Manufacturer: Nieuport
- Number built: 2

History
- First flight: December 1918

The Nieuport Madon was a prototype 1917 French single-seat strut-braced gull-wing monoplane fighter, with an additional lifting surface between the undercarriage.

== Design and development ==
The tapered gull wing was supported by lift struts attached to the landing gear, which featured an additional constant chord lifting area between the wheels. A section of wing root at the trailing edge, and later the gap between the spars were cut away to improve downward visibility. The fuselage and wing were wood structures with a fabric covering. It was armed with two synchronized 7.7 mm (0.30 in) Vickers machine guns.

The first flight was made in December 1917, or early January 1918 while powered by a 110 kW (150 hp) Gnome Monosoupape 9N rotary engine, the same engine used in the Nieuport 28.

The second prototype first flew in late January 1918 with the slightly more powerful 130 kW (180 hp) Le Rhône 9R. This aircraft had a revised wing whose inboard trailing edges were cut away and it had an elongated fin. On 1 May 1918 the second prototype was rejected in favour of the Monosoupape powered model.

The Nieuport Madon was not officially accepted but would be refined through the Nieuport 31 the Nieuport-Delage Sesquiplan and eventually into the Nieuport-Delage NiD 62 which was still in second line service in 1940.

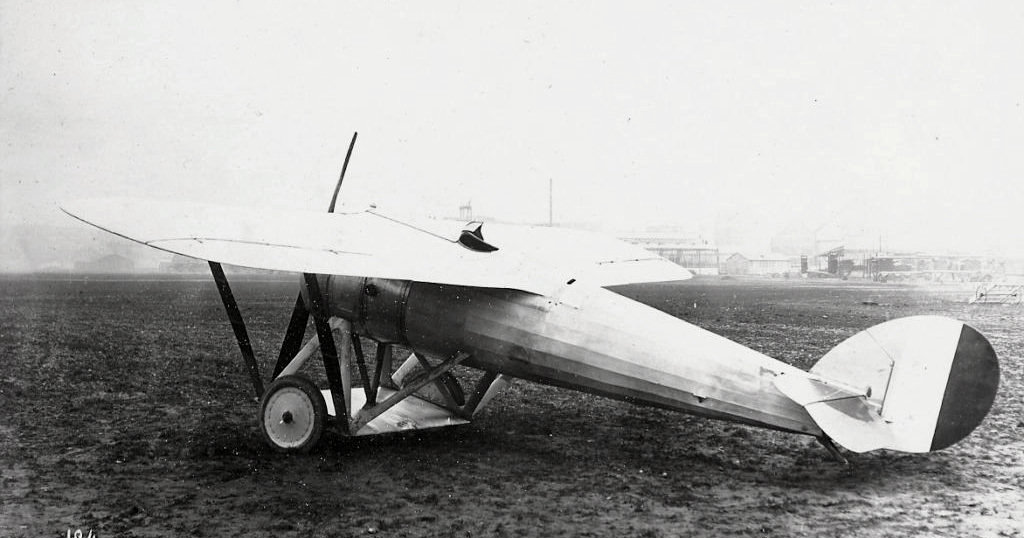
Nieuport Madon circa 1918

== Specifications ==
Data from The Complete Book of Fighters

General characteristics

- Crew: 1
- Length: 6.4 m (21 ft 0 in)
- Wingspan: 9.4 m (30 ft 10 in)
- Height: 2.4 m (7 ft 10 in)
- Wing area: 17.5 m^{2} (188 sq ft)
- Empty weight: 433 kg (955 lb)
- Gross weight: 703 kg (1,550 lb)
- Powerplant: 1 × Gnome Monosoupape 9N 9-cylinder air-cooled rotary piston engine, 110 kW (150 hp)
- Propellers: 2-bladed

Performance

- Maximum speed: 220 km/h (140 mph, 120 kn)
- Endurance: 2 hours
- Time to altitude: Time to 4,000 m (13,000 ft) - 13 min.

Armament

- Guns: 2x synchronized 7.7 mm (0.303 in) Vickers machine guns

== See also ==
Aircraft of comparable role, configuration, and era

- Bristol M.1
- Fokker D.VIII
- Morane-Saulnier AI
- PZL P.6

Related lists

- List of World War I Entente aircraft
