= Nieuport-Delage NiD 39 =

1920s French airliner

NiD 39
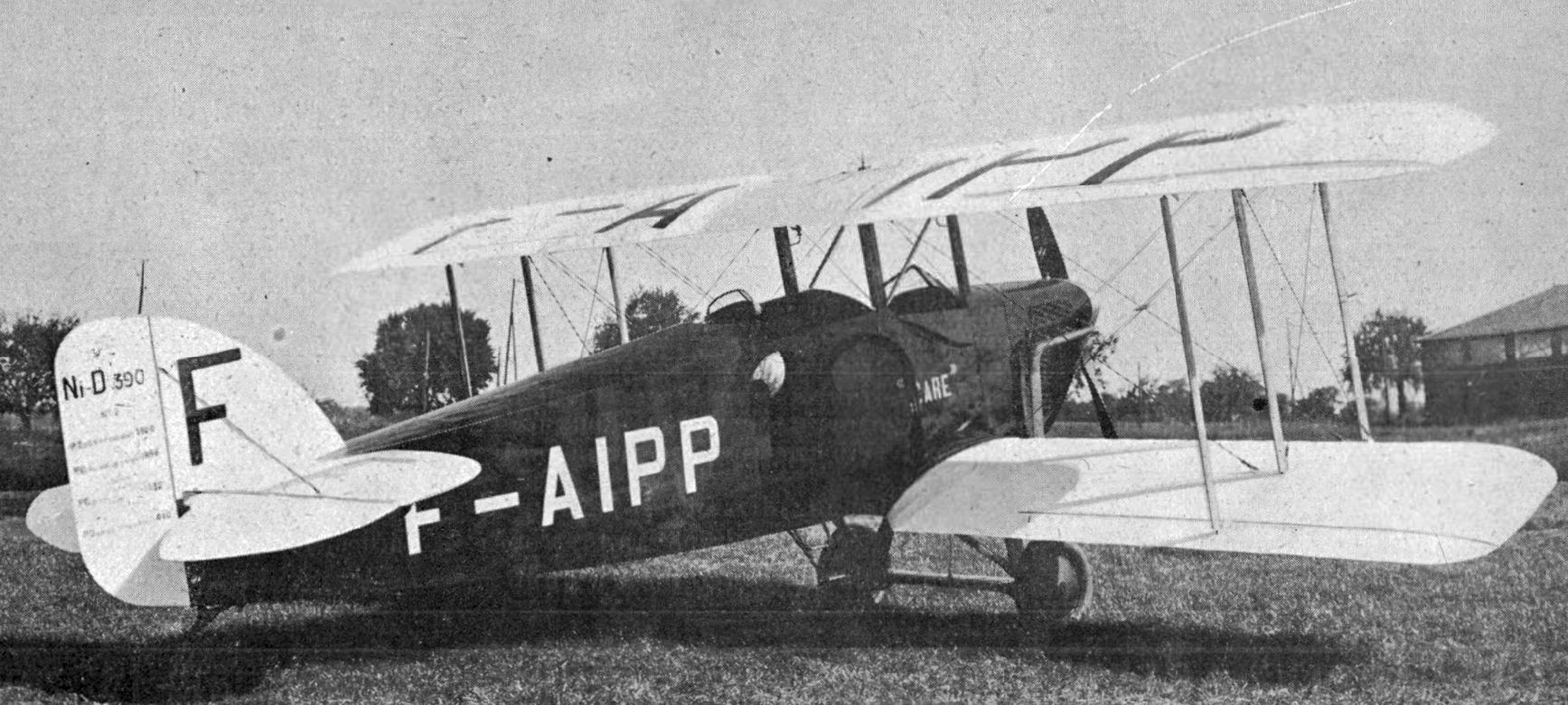
- NiD 390 T

General information
- Type: Airliner
- National origin: France
- Manufacturer: Nieuport-Delage
- Number built: 33

History
- Introduction date: Compagnie Aérienne Française
- First flight: 1927

The Nieuport-Delage NiD 39 was an airliner produced in France in the late 1920s, developed from the NiD 38.

== History ==
The airline Compagnie Aérienne Française had purchased four examples of the previous aircraft and ordered an improved version with greater passenger capacity from the manufacturer. Like its predecessor, the NiD 39 was a single-bay biplane of conventional design with an enclosed cabin its passengers and an open cockpit for the pilot. However, while the NiD 38 could only carry two passengers, the NiD 39 could carry four. CAF also specified the engine to be used – the Armstrong Siddeley Lynx – although the first eight examples produced flew with the same Hispano-Suiza engine that had powered the NiD 38. The airline operated around thirty examples on routes between western European cities until 1932.

== Variants ==
- NiD 390 - initial version with Hispano-Suiza 8Ac engine (8 built)
- NiD 391 - main production version with Armstrong Siddeley Lynx IVC engine (20 built, plus 2 converted from NiD 390)
  - NiD 391/2 - NiD 391 with 30 cm (12 inch) fuselage stretch (7 built)
- NiD 393 - version with Lorraine 7Ma engine (1 converted from NiD 391)

== Operators ==
- France
  - Compagnie Aérienne Française

== Specifications (NiD 391) ==
Data from aviafrance.com

General characteristics

- Crew: One pilot
- Capacity: 4 passengers
- Length: 8.20 m (26 ft 11 in)
- Wingspan: 10.60 m (34 ft 9 in)
- Height: 3.25 m (10 ft 8 in)
- Wing area: 39.0 m^{2} (420 sq ft)
- Empty weight: 898 kg (1,980 lb)
- Gross weight: 1,400 kg (3,100 lb)
- Powerplant: 1 × Armstrong Siddeley Lynx IVC , 150 kW (200 hp)

Performance

- Maximum speed: 175 km/h (110 mph, 96 kn)
- Range: 375 km (234 mi, 203 nmi)
- Service ceiling: 4,000 m (13,000 ft)
