= Nieuport 31 =

Nie 31
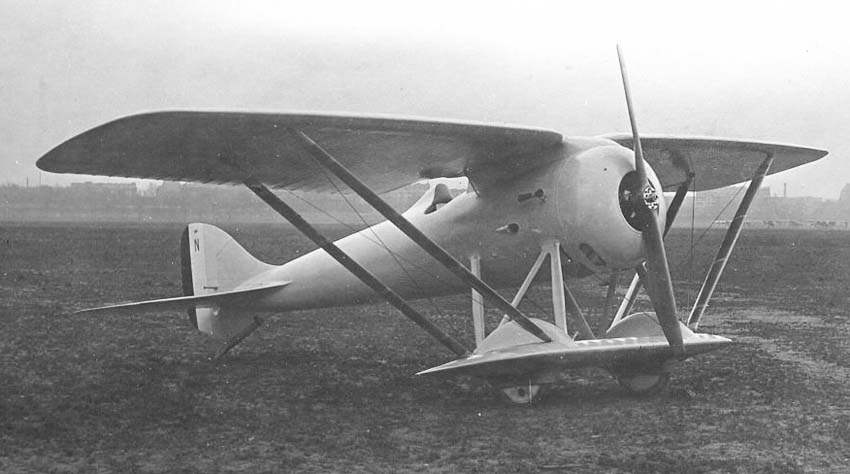
- Nieuport 31 circa 1919

General information
- Type: Single-seat fighter
- National origin: France
- Manufacturer: Nieuport
- Status: Abandoned
- Number built: 2

History
- First flight: 1919
- Developed from: Nieuport Madon

The Nieuport Nie 31 or Nieuport 31 was a single-engine, single-seat monoplane or sesquiplane fighter aircraft designed and built in France in 1919.

== Design and development ==
Though the Nie 31 (it had been flown and subsequently abandoned before the company changed its name to Nieuport-Delage) was technically a sesquiplane, it could equally well be described as a shoulder-wing monoplane with a small foreplane. Its immediate predecessor was the Nieuport Madon, which had an ancillary lifting surface built around the axle of its wide-track undercarriage. The Nie 31 had a narrower-track undercarriage, but the second wing extended outwards beyond the wheels, which were faired into its upper surface; this wing and the axle were joined to the lower fuselage by a pair of near vertical N-form struts.

The main plane was of low aspect ratio. In plan it had a rounded leading edge, straight trailing edge and square tips. Its roots were cut away to allow a better downward view from the cockpit. This was placed ahead of the trailing edge so the pilot looked forward over the wing; he had a faired headrest behind. The Nie 31's upper wing had ailerons but no flaps and was braced on each side by a parallel pair of aerofoil section struts stretching outwards from the bottom of the undercarriage struts. The lower wing had parallel chord and straight edges, providing a lifting surface with about 40% the area of the main plane. Both wings were fabric covered.

The Nie 31 was powered by a 130 kW (180 hp) Le Rhone 9R nine-cylinder rotary engine, smoothly and completely cowled. It drove a two-blade propeller. The fuselage, like that of the earlier Nieuport Nie 29, was a smooth wooden monocoque shell of tulipwood, produced by winding thin spiral strips around a mould in a series of alternately handed layers and glueing them together. It tapered to the rear, where an almost delta-shaped tailplane was mounted at mid-height, carrying horn-balanced elevators. The fin was much less broad, with a straight-edged, balanced rudder extending down between the elevators below the lower fuselage, where there was a small dorsal fin.

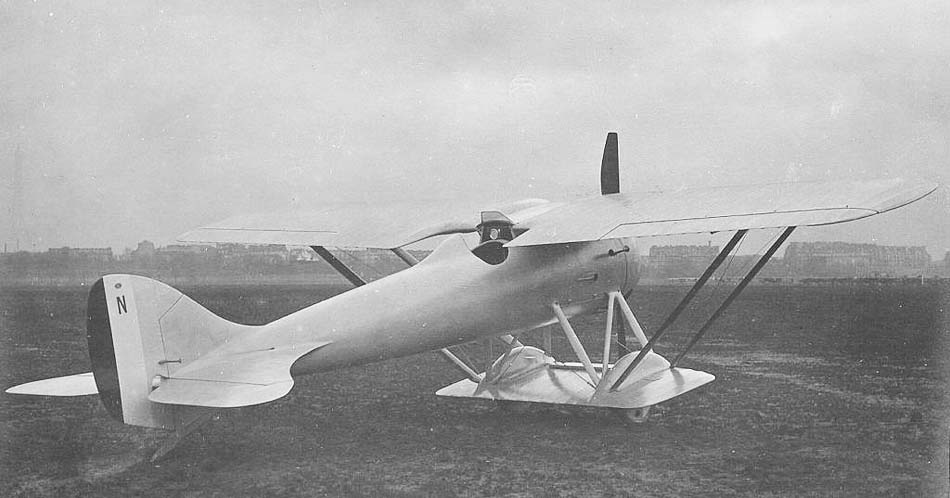
Cockpit view

The Nie 31 was intended to carry twin 7.7 mm (0.303 in) Vickers machine guns. A flight test programme conducted through 1919 showed that the Nie 31 had excellent performance, especially given the low engine power, but Nieuport did not proceed with its development as a fighter, however the Nieuport-Delage Sesquiplan was a direct evolution of this design, but powered with a Hispano-Suiza 8 water-cooled V8 engine, and was built specifically for racing.

== Specifications ==
Data from The Complete Book of Fighters: An Illustrated Encyclopedia of Every Fighter Built and Flown

General characteristics

- Crew: One
- Length: 6.60 m (21 ft 8 in)
- Wingspan: 8.60 m (28 ft 3 in)
- Height: 2.40 m (7 ft 10 in)
- Wing area: 18.0 m^{2} (194 sq ft)
- Empty weight: 500 kg (1,102 lb)
- Gross weight: 780 kg (1,720 lb)
- Powerplant: 1 × Le Rhone 9R nine cylinder rotary engine, 130 kW (180 hp)
- Propellers: 2-bladed fixed pitch

Performance

- Maximum speed: 230 km/h (140 mph, 120 kn)
- Endurance: 2 hours
- Service ceiling: 6,000 m (20,000 ft)

Armament

- 2 × fixed 7.7 mm (0.303 in) Vickers machine guns in nose

== See also ==
- 1919 in aviation

== Bibliography ==
- Davilla, Dr. James J. & Soltan, Arthur M. (1997). French Aircraft of the First World War. Stratford, Connecticut: Flying Machines Press. ISBN 0-9637110-4-0.
- Green, William & Swanborough, Gordon (2001) [1994]. The Complete Book of Fighters: An Illustrated Encyclopedia of Every Fighter Built and Flown (Revised and Updated ed.). London: Salamander Books. ISBN 1-84065-269-1.
- Owers, Colin A. (2020). French Warplanes of WWI: A Centennial Perspective on Great War Airplanes. Gret War Aviation Centennial Series (43). Vol. 1: Fighters. n.p.: Aeronaut Books. ISBN 978-1-935881-93-3.
