= Letov Š-8 =

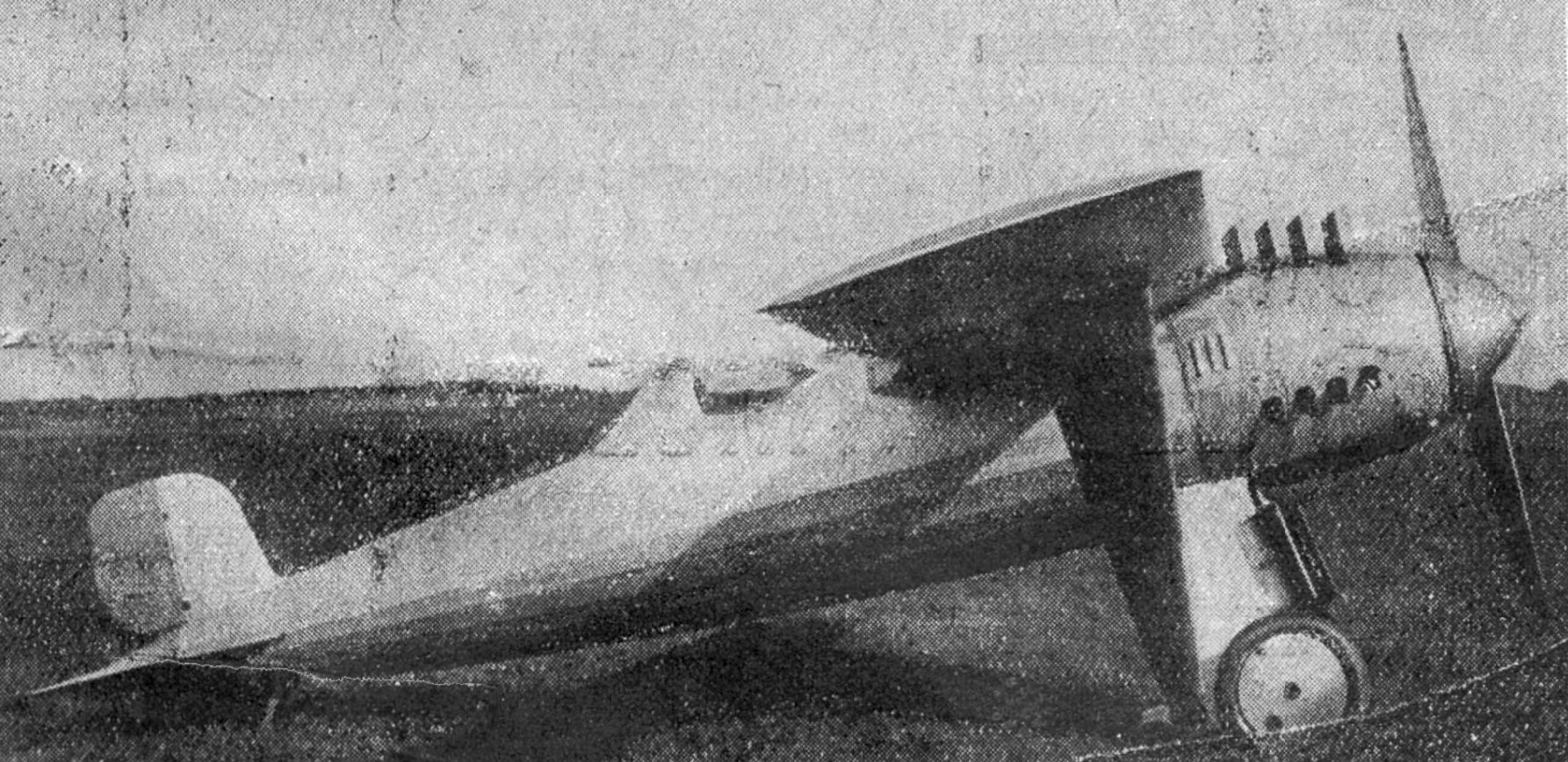

General information
- Type: Racing aircraft
- National origin: Czech Republic
- Manufacturer: Letov Kbely

History
- First flight: 1923

The Letov Š-8 was a Czech racing aircraft designed by Alois Šmolik. The aircraft was wooden-built, mostly fabric covered, with tail-skid undercarriage and was powered by a Napier Lion engine.

== Specifications ==
Data from Jane's all the World's Aircraft 1924

General characteristics

- Crew: one
- Length: 8.3 m (27 ft 3 in)
- Wingspan: 11.4 m (37 ft 5 in)
- Height: 3.45 m (11 ft 4 in)
- Wing area: 16.5 m^{2} (178 sq ft)
- Empty weight: 1,030 kg (2,271 lb)
- Gross weight: 1,230 kg (2,712 lb)
- Powerplant: 1 × Napier Lion piston aero-engine, 340 kW (450 hp)

Performance

- Maximum speed: 360 km/h (220 mph, 190 kn)
- Cruise speed: 330 km/h (210 mph, 180 kn)
- Range: 400 km (250 mi, 220 nmi)
- Service ceiling: 7,000 m (23,000 ft)
- Wing loading: 74.8 kg/m^{2} (15.3 lb/sq ft)
- Power/mass: 0.2834 kW/kg (0.1724 hp/lb)

== See also ==
Aircraft of comparable role, configuration, and era

- Nieuport-Delage Sesquiplan
