= Nieuport =

Defunct French aircraft manufacturer

Société anonyme des Établissements Nieuport
- Industry: Aeronautics, defence
- Predecessor: Société Générale d’Aéro-Locomotion (SGAL)
- Founded: 1908
- Founder: Édouard Nieuport
- Defunct: January 1937
- Fate: Merged
- Successor: SNCAO
- Headquarters: Suresnes, France
- Products: Aircraft, boats and electrical components

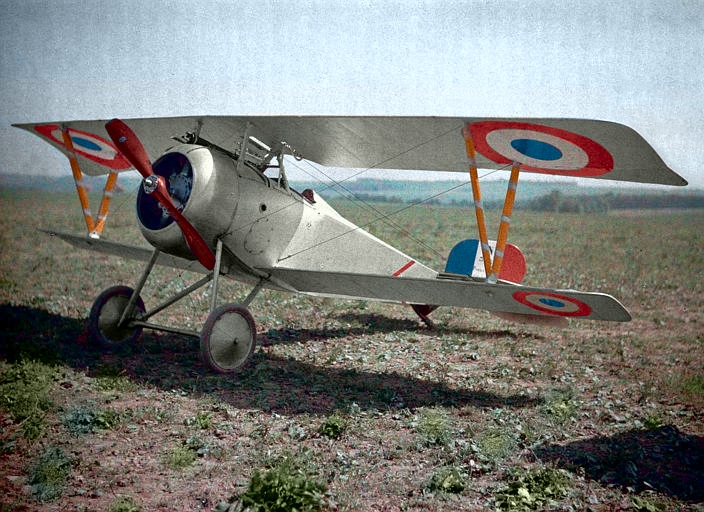
Original colour photo of a Nieuport 23 C.1 fighter of World War I

Nieuport, later Nieuport-Delage, was a French aeroplane company that primarily built racing aircraft before World War I and fighter aircraft during World War I and between the wars.

== History ==
=== Beginnings ===
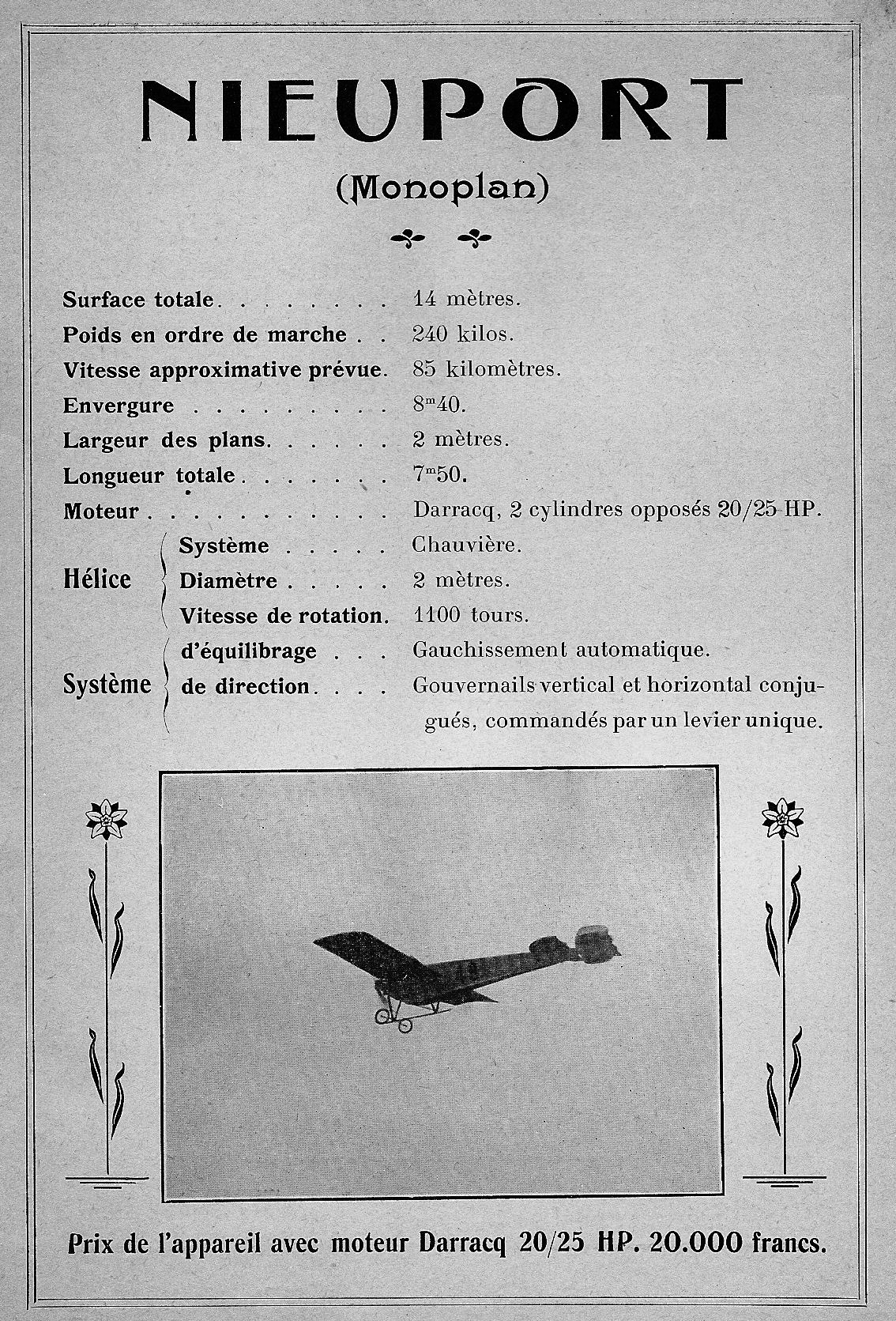
1911 Nieuport catalogue showing an early version of the Nieuport 2

Originally formed as Nieuport-Duplex in 1902 for the manufacture of engine components the company was re-formed in 1909 as the Société Générale d'Aéro-locomotion, and its products were marketed to the aviation industry, including ignition components. During this time they built their first aircraft, a small single-seat pod and boom monoplane. This was destroyed shortly after having been flown successfully, during the Great Flood of Paris in 1909 . A second design flew before the end of 1909 and had the essential form of modern aircraft, including an enclosed fuselage with the pilot protected from the slipstream and a horizontal tail whose aerodynamic force acted downwards, balancing the weight of the engine ahead of the centre of gravity, as opposed to upwards as on contemporaries such as the Blériot XI.

Nieuport had trouble obtaining suitable engines for their early designs and resorted to making their own. In 1910 a twin-cylinder horizontally opposed type producing 28 hp (21 kW) was fitted to the Nieuport II and proved successful.

In 1911, the company was re-formed specifically to build aircraft while continuing to build components, including propellers, under the name Nieuport et Deplante. In 1911, Edouard Nieuport (1875–1911), who was one of several aviation-minded brothers, died after being thrown from his aircraft, and the company was taken over by Henri Deutsch de la Meurthe, a famous supporter of aviation development. With his financing, the name was changed to Société Anonyme des Établissements Nieuport, and development of existing designs was continued. A second of the brothers, Charles Nieuport, died in another accident January 24, 1913 after he stalled and spun in, and the position of chief designer was taken over by the Swiss engineer Franz Schneider, better known for his work for his next employer, L.V.G., and his long-running fight with Anthony Fokker over machine gun interrupter / synchronizer patents. Schneider left Nieuport in late 1913.

=== Gustave Delage and World War I ===
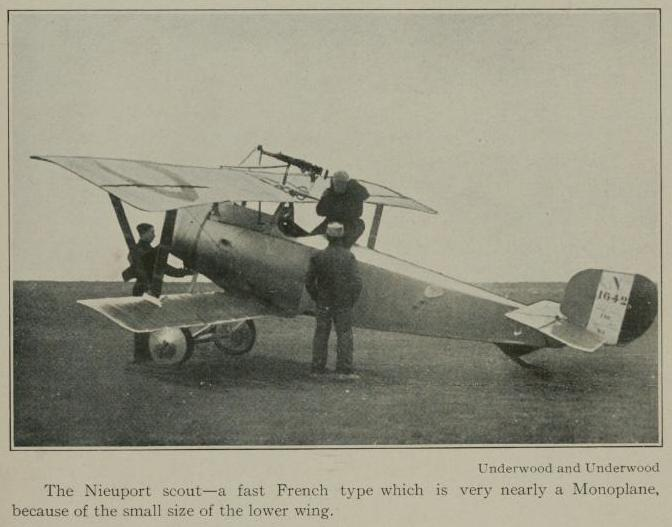
Nieuport 21 fighter

With Schneider's departure, Gustave Delage (no connection to the Delage automobile company) took over as chief designer in January 1914. He began work on a sesquiplane racer – a type of biplane whose lower wing was much narrower in chord than its top wing. This aircraft was not ready to fly until after World War I had begun but, as the Nieuport 10, the type saw extensive service with the Royal Naval Air Service (R.N.A.S.) of the United Kingdom and with the French and Russian Flying Services. The performance of the Nieuport 10, and the more powerful Nieuport 12, which also served with the Royal Flying Corps (R.F.C.) was such that they were used as fighters. Nieuport developed an improved design specifically intended as a fighter – the Nieuport 11, which was regarded as the "baby" (bébé) of the 10, which it closely resembled, except in size.

Until the end of 1917, most of the company's output would consist of successive developments of this one design, with more powerful engines, modest increases in overall dimensions, and refined aerodynamics, until the line ended with the Nieuport 27. As horsepower increased, the "V-strut" Nieuports began to reach their maximum safe flying speed (VNE) more readily and discovered the limitations of the three spars sesquiplane wing form, which then required they avoid sustained power-on dives to avoid the risk of wing failures. By the spring of 1917 the design was being surpassed by the new twin-gun Albatros D.III, and although the process of replacement had begun, Nieuport 27's would still be in front line service in the spring of 1918. Even while still in frontline service, Nieuports of all types were being used at French and American flight training facilities, with the bulk of production from 1917 onwards going to flying schools.

Some pilots, notably Albert Ball and Charles Nungesser, preferred the Nieuport due to its sensitive controls and maneuverability. Pilots Eddie Rickenbacker and Billy Bishop flew Nieuport aircraft to some of their first victories.

The first major break from the sesquiplane design, the Nieuport 28 was the first production Nieuport fighter with two spars to both upper and lower wings, but by the time it was ready for service the French had already chosen the SPAD S.XIII as their primary fighter. Due to a shortage of SPAD S.XIIIs and problems with their engines, the first fighter squadrons of the United States Army Air Service (USAAS) used the Nieuport 28 on operations. While only in operational service with the USAAS for a short time, the Nieuport 28 was the first fighter to be used on operations by an American squadron.

Nieuports were widely used by the Allied air arms, and various models were built under licence in Italy, Russia and the United Kingdom. In Italy, Aermacchi was originally formed as Nieuport-Macchi for the purpose of building various Nieuports under licence. They started with the Nieuport IV, but built the Nieuport 10, 11, 17 and finally the post-war NiD.29 under licence. In Russia several companies, notably Dux, built Nieuports of several types including the IV, 10, 11, 16, 17, 21, 23 and 24bis, with the 24bis continuing in production after the Russian Revolution had ended. In Scotland, William Beardmore and Company built the Nieuport 12 under licence, while gradually incorporating many of their own changes. Nieuport & General Aircraft was formed to build Nieuport fighters under licence in England, and built 50 Nieuport 17bis scouts for the Royal Naval Air Service before switching to other aircraft.

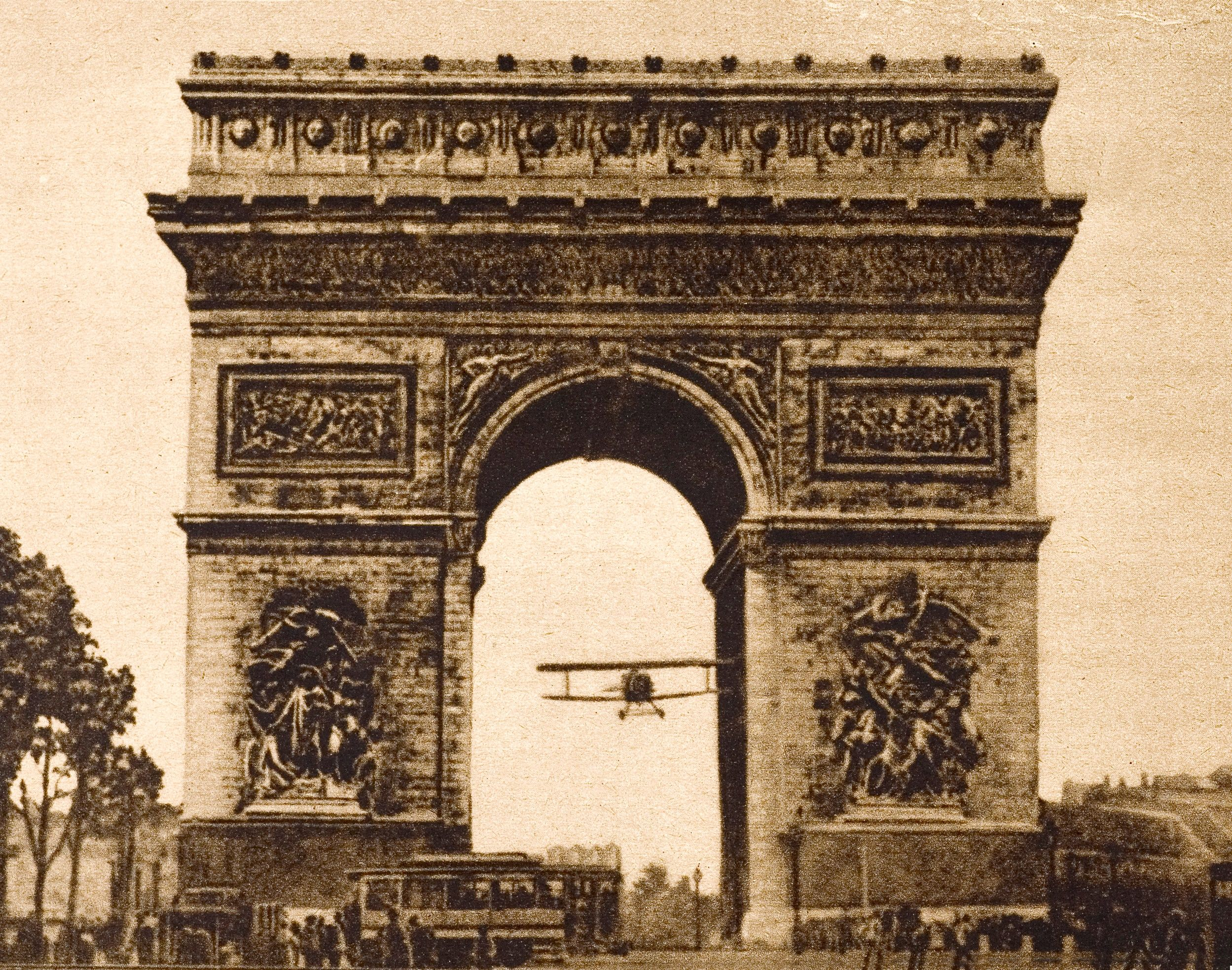
Charles Godefroy flies a Nieuport fighter through the Arc de Triomphe in 1919

Three weeks after the Paris victory parade in 1919 marking the end of hostilities in World War I, and in protest over being forced to march like infantry in the parade, Charles Godefroy flew a "v-strut" Nieuport fighter through the arch of the Arc de Triomphe in Paris on the morning of Friday, 8 August 1919. The event was filmed.

=== Post–World War I ===
By the end of 1918, Nieuport had two new fighter types flying, the Nieuport 29 biplane and the Nieuport 31 monoplane both of which had evolved in parallel from the Nieuport 28. They differed from earlier Nieuports in having streamlined wooden monocoque fuselages, and 300 hp (220 kW) Hispano-Suiza engines. Specially modified Nieuport 29 and 31 aircraft set speed and height records, and the 31 was the first aircraft to exceed 200 mph (320 km/h) in level flight, while in the hands of Joseph Sadi-Lecointe.

At this time, Nieuport became Nieuport-Astra, with the absorption of Société Astra, a company known for aerial balloons, though this name would not be used for long, before becoming Nieuport-Delage, in honour of the work of the chief designer, Gustave Delage, who had been running the company through the war years. Also at this time, the seaplane builder Tellier was absorbed, and for a brief time the name Nieuport-Tellier was also used.

Despite the many successes achieved with 29 and 31 in setting speed and altitude records, Delage quickly embarked on a new design that was to provide the basis for a family of aircraft that would remain in service until the fall of France during World War II – the Nieuport-Delage NiD.42. This design first saw light as a shoulder-wing racer (42S), then as single-seat (42 C.1) and two-seat fighters (42 C.2) for the French Air Force, although none of these variants would see service. The Nieuport-Delage 52, a slightly improved NiD.42 with a metal monocoque fuselage, entered service with Spain where it was also built under licence by Hispano-Suiza, and remained in service well into the Spanish Civil War. By then it was obsolete and would be retired before the end of the conflict. The French bought large numbers of the 62 series (620, 621, 622, 629) which were also derived from the NiD.42 to equip the bulk of the French fighter units until replaced by newer designs in the late 30s. Despite being hopelessly obsolete, several French second-line escadrilles were still equipped with them during the invasion of France.

The Nieuport-Delage NiD 38 and similar 39 were small airliners of which more than 37 were built. Other types were developed, the majority of which were one-offs or did not result in significant production.

=== The end of Nieuport ===
The final aircraft developed by Nieuport saw much of its development done by successor companies. In 1932, as a result of the amalgamations taking place in the French aviation industry, Delage retired and Nieuport-Delage was briefly renamed Nieuport again, before merging with Loire Aviation to form Loire-Nieuport, which was then merged into SNCAO during the amalgamations in the French aircraft industry. SNCAO would in turn be merged into the massive conglomerate known as Aérospatiale. During the German invasion of France in 1940, the company's records were burnt to prevent their falling into German hands. This step didn't prevent the Germans from charging several employees with espionage, as the last operational Nieuport, the Loire-Nieuport LN.401 was a single-seat, single-engine retractable-gear monoplane dive bomber with an inverted gull wing with a vague similarity to the Junkers Ju 87.

== Aircraft produced ==
In later three digit designations (except NiD 120 and LN.160), the third numeral represents a sub-variant with a 0 representing a base variant so that a 640 and a 64 are the same.

- Nieuport I – retroactive designation for pod and boom tractor monoplane, destroyed during the 1910 Great Flood of Paris after one flight.
- Nieuport II – single-seat sport/racing monoplane powered by a variety of engines.
- Nieuport III – two-seat sport/racing monoplane with Anzani engine.
- Nieuport IV – two-seat sport/racing monoplane.
- Nieuport VI – three-seat sport monoplane used by French Navy and Royal Naval Air Service.
- Nieuport VIII – two-seat sport monoplane, variant of VI for Turkey.
- Nieuport X – three-seat monoplane similar to VI but with constant chord wings, used by French Navy.
- Nieuport XI – prototype single-seat sport monoplane similar to II but with constant chord wings.
- Nieuport XII – prototype armoured monoplane similar to the X
- Nieuport-Dunne – licence-built tailless biplane with many local modifications.
- Nieuport Carton-Pate – military twin boom sesquiplane pusher floatplane.
- Nieuport 9 – Russian designation for locally built single-seat Nieuport 10.
- Nieuport 10 – sesquiplane used in many roles, unrelated to monoplane Nieuport X.
  - Nieuport 83 – purpose-built trainer version of Nieuport 10 with 80-hp Le Rhône engine (hence 8x series designation).
- Nieuport 11 – sesquiplane fighter – Nieuport's first purpose-built fighter, no relation to earlier Nieuport XI.
- Nieuport 12 – two-seat artillery spotting sesquiplane developed from Nieuport 10.
  - Nieuport 80 and 81 – trainer versions of Nieuport 12 with 80-hp engines.
- Nieuport 12bis – two-seat artillery-spotting sesquiplane, extensively redesigned from Nieuport 12.
- Nieuport 13 – development of Nieuport 12 with slightly longer wings.
- Nieuport 14 – two-seat reconnaissance sesquiplane.
  - Nieuport 82 – Nieuport 14 trainer with 80-hp engine.
- Nieuport 15 – large sesquiplane bomber, enlargement of 14.
- Nieuport 16 – fighter – strengthened Nieuport 11 powered by 110 hp Le Rhône 9J engine.
- Nieuport 17 – fighter – enlarged and more refined development of 16.
- Nieuport 17bis – fighter – cleaned-up Nieuport 17 powered by Clerget. Used in small numbers by the British.
- Nieuport 18 – twin-engine sesquiplane bomber.
- Nieuport 19 – Nieuport 18 with different engines. Neither appears to have been completed.
- Nieuport 20 – Nieuport 12 development.
- Nieuport 21 – light weight fighter derived from Nieuport 17 with lower-powered engine.
- Nieuport 23 – development of Nieuport 17 with Vickers machine gun offset (when installed).
- Nieuport 24 – cleaned-up Nieuport 17 with fuselage faired with stringers and new empennage.
- Nieuport 24bis – 24 but with Nieuport 17 rudder and horizontal tail.
- Nieuport 25 – 24 with larger Clerget engine – small number only.
- Nieuport 26 – prototype Hispano-Suiza 8A powered development of 24.
- Nieuport 27 – improved 24 and penultimate vee-strutter.
- Nieuport 28 – biplane fighter used by American Expeditionary Forces' Air Service.
- Nieuport Madon – monoplane fighter developed into 31, sesquiplan and others.
- Nieuport 29/Nieuport-Delage NiD 29 – widely used biplane fighter.
- Nieuport 30T/Nieuport-Delage NiD 30T – large single-engine biplane airliner developed from bomber.
- Nieuport 31/31Rh – 1919 Le Rhone-engined monoplane/sesquiplane fighter prototype.
- Nieuport-Delage NiD 32/32M/32Rh – rotary-powered naval variant of Nieuport-Delage NiD 29.
- Nieuport-Delage NiD 33 – trainer with box section fuselage based on NiD.29, some used by Japan.
- Nieuport-Delage NiD 37 – 1922 Coupe Deutsche racing sesquiplane and fighter with pilot over engine.
- Nieuport-Delage NiD 38 & NiD 39 – single-engine biplane cabin airliners with different engines.
- Nieuport-Delage NiD 40 – high-altitude Nieuport-Delage 29 variant.
- Nieuport-Delage 41 Sesquiplan – monoplane racer which set many speed records.
- Nieuport-Delage NiD 42 – sesquiplane fighter, prototype for 52, 62, 72 and others, originally a parasol monoplane.
  - Nieuport-Delage NiD 42S – shoulder wing racing monoplane developed from sesquiplan.
- Nieuport-Delage NiD 43 – floatplane fighter.
- Nieuport-Delage NiD 44 – development of 42 with different engine.
- Nieuport-Delage NiD 450 & 650 – monoplane floatplane racers for Schneider Trophy.
- Nieuport-Delage NiD 46 – development of 42 with different engine.
- Nieuport-Delage NiD 48 – sesquiplane fighter scaled down NiD 42 for Jockey light fighter program.
- Nieuport-Delage NiD 50 – abandoned twin-engine floatplane torpedo bomber.
- Nieuport-Delage NiD 52 – sesquiplane fighter derived from NiD 42 used by Spain.
- Nieuport-Delage NiD 540 – single-engine high-wing transport.
- Nieuport-Delage NiD 580 – two-seat reconnaissance parasol monoplane.
- Nieuport-Delage NiD 62 – sesquiplane fighter used in large numbers by France.
- Nieuport-Delage NiD 64, 640 & 641 – large single-engine monoplane airliner with elliptical wing.
- Nieuport-Delage NiD 72 – sesquiplane fighter all metal version of 62.
- Nieuport-Delage NiD 740 – trimotor long range mailplane prototype built to a government requirement.
- Nieuport-Delage NiD-120 – single-seat parasol monoplane fighter used by Peru.
- Loire-Nieuport LN.10 – twin-engine inverted gull monoplane patrol floatplane with engines over wing.
- Loire-Nieuport LN.30 – single-engine pusher training flying boat.
- Loire-Nieuport LN.40 – single-engine, single-seat dive bomber with inverted gull wing.
- Loire-Nieuport LN.160 – single-engine, single-seat fighter, developed into SNCAO 200.

A number of prototypes, especially during the First World War do not have known designations, including developments of the 24/27, and 28 with various engine installations, and structural improvements including monocoque fuselages, modified wing designs which included triplane variants of the Nieuport 10, 17 and 17bis.

Several Tellier designs were built under the Nieuport name, including:

- Tellier T.5 as Nieuport BM. – a twin engine patrol flying boat.
- Tellier T.6 as Nieuport S. – a single engine patrol flying boat.
- Tellier T.8 as Nieuport TM. – a trimotor patrol flying boat.
- Tellier Vonna as Nieuport 4R. – a four engine transatlantic flying boat not completed.

During World War I, Nieuport aircraft were sometimes referred to by their wing area (in square meters) rather than their official designations.

- Nieuport 10 and 83 were 18-meter Nieuports.
- Nieuport 11 & 16 were 13-meter Nieuports.
- Nieuport 12, 12bis, 20, 80 and 81 were 23-meter Nieuports.
- Nieuport 17, 17bis, 21, 23, 24, 24bis, and 27 were 15-meter Nieuports.

== Gallery ==
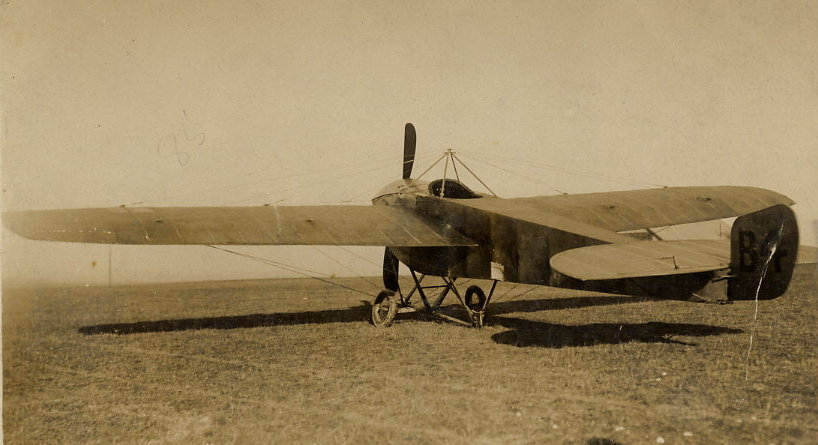
Nieuport IV.G

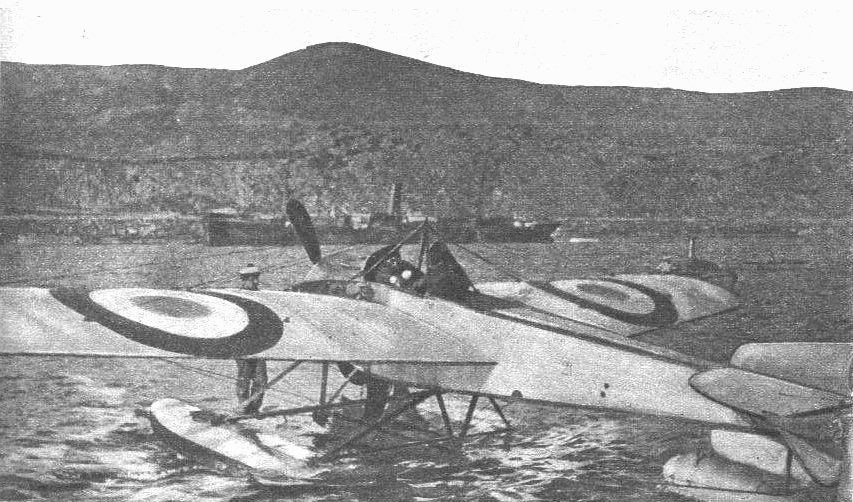
Nieuport VI.H

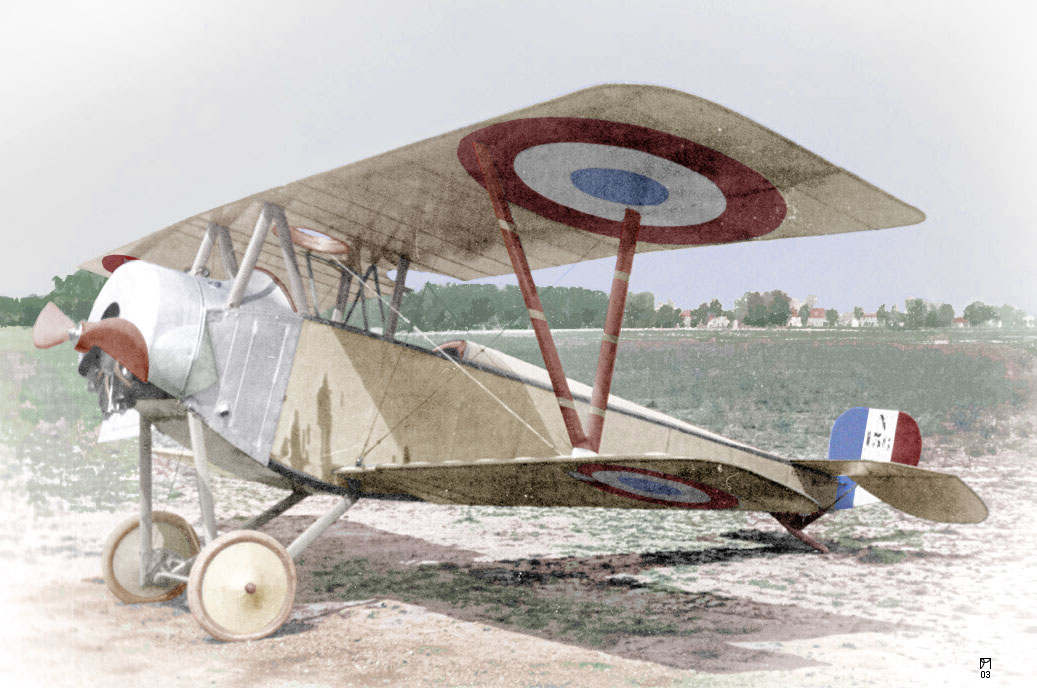
Nieuport 10 C.1

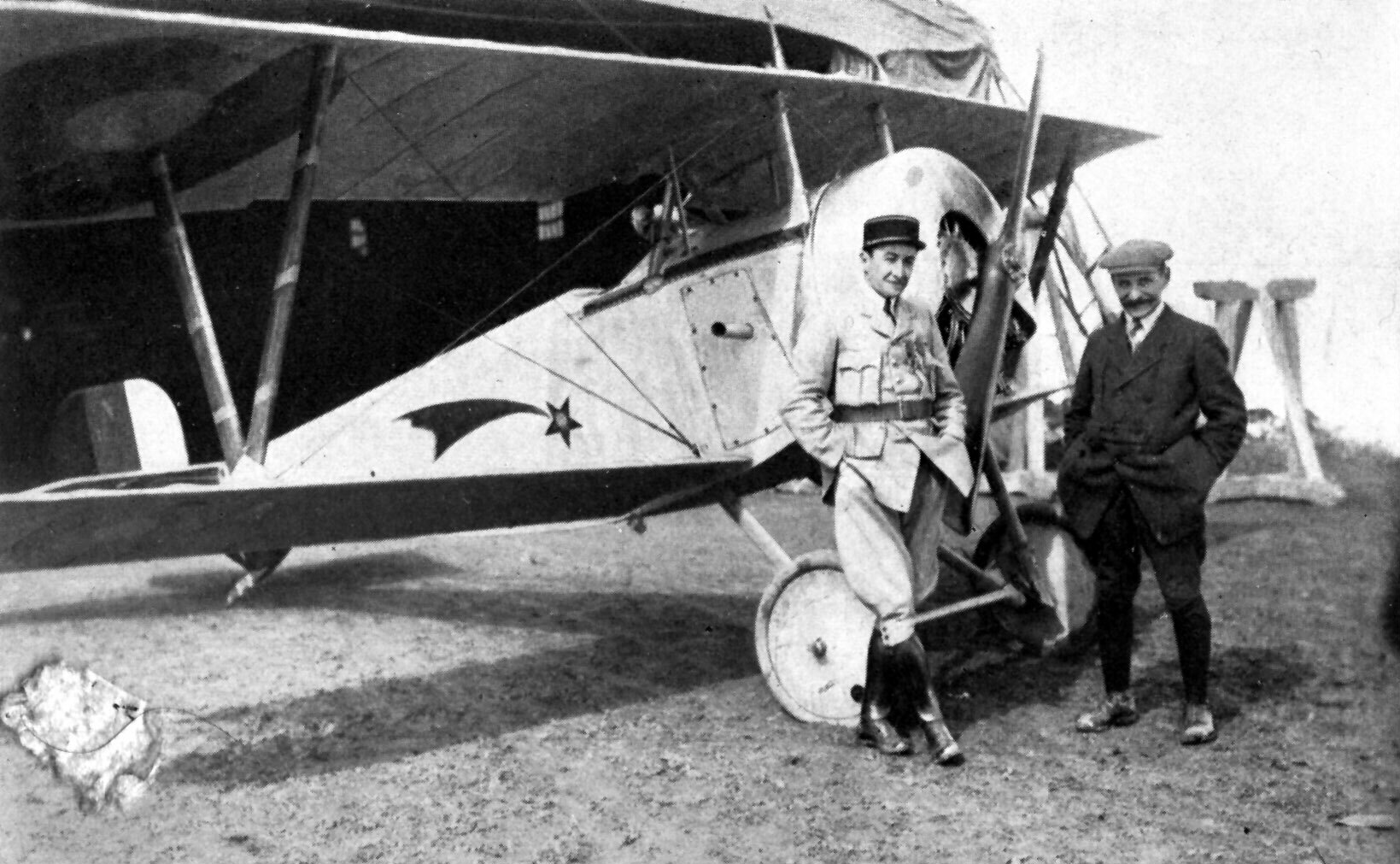
Nieuport 11 C.1

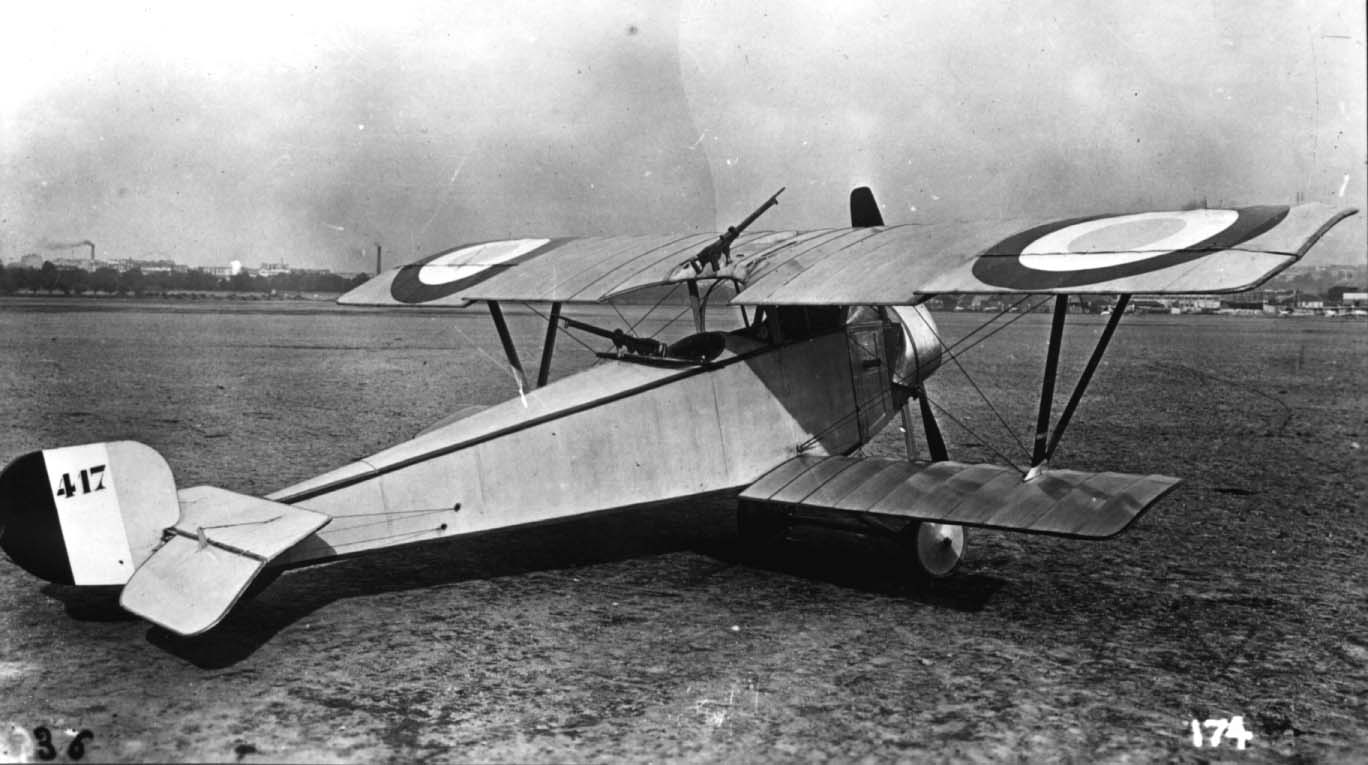
Nieuport 12 A.2 Prototype

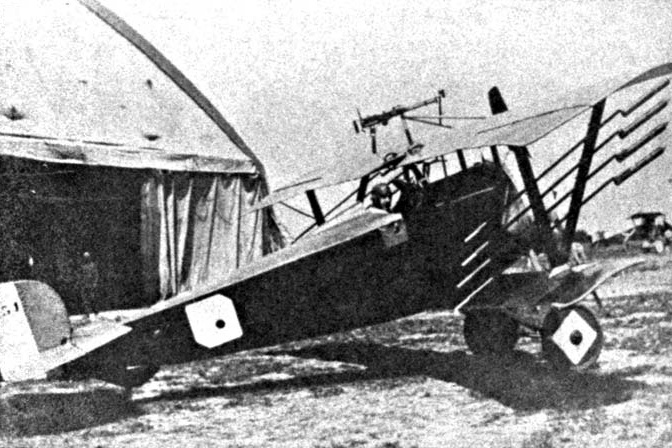
Nieuport 16 with Le Prier anti-balloon rockets

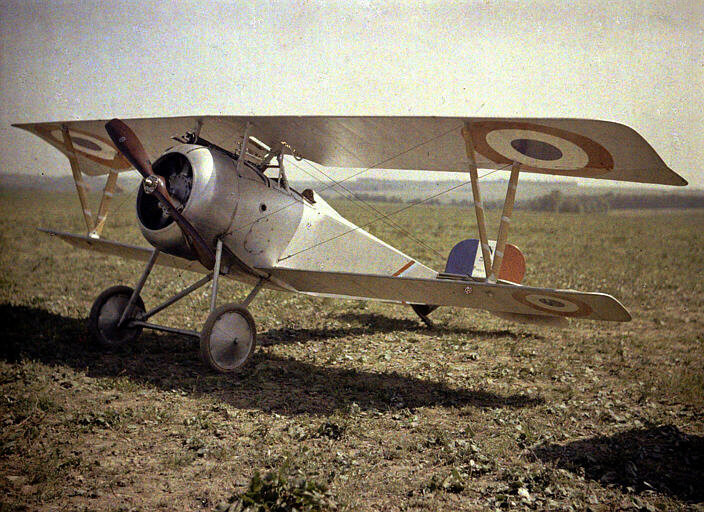
Nieuport 23 C.1

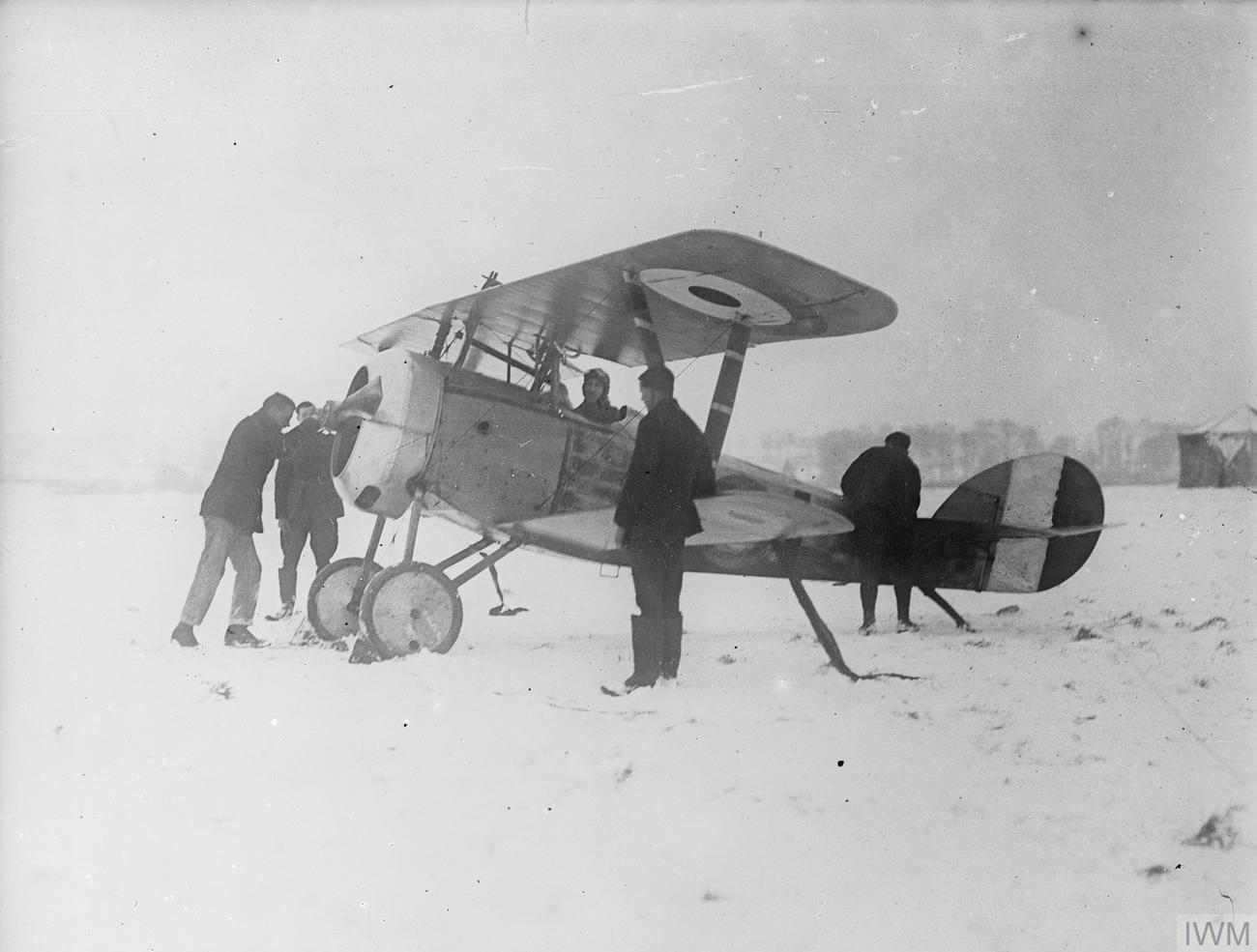
Nieuport 27 C.1

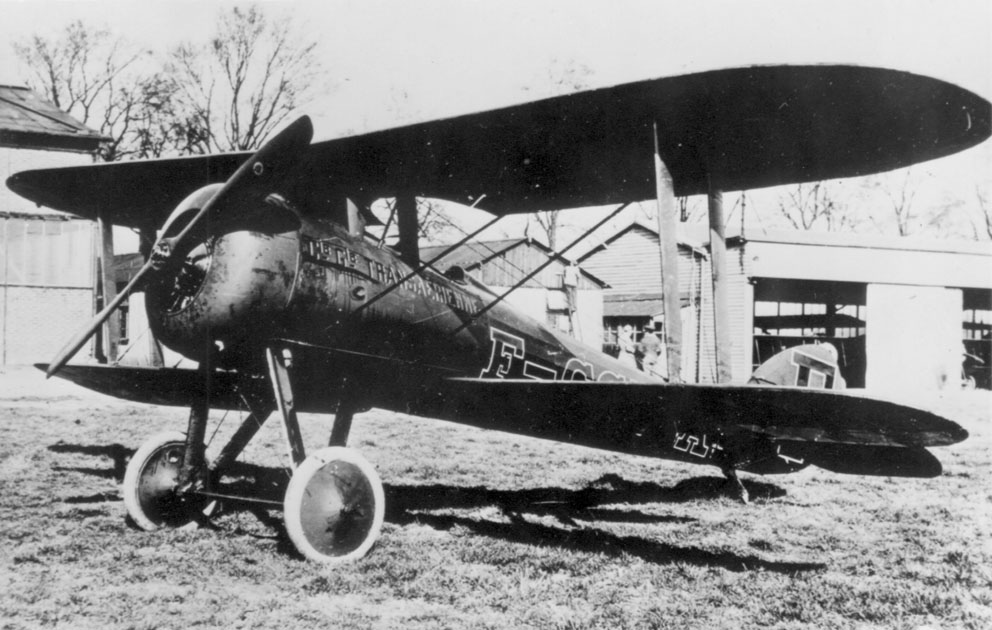
Nieuport 28 C.1

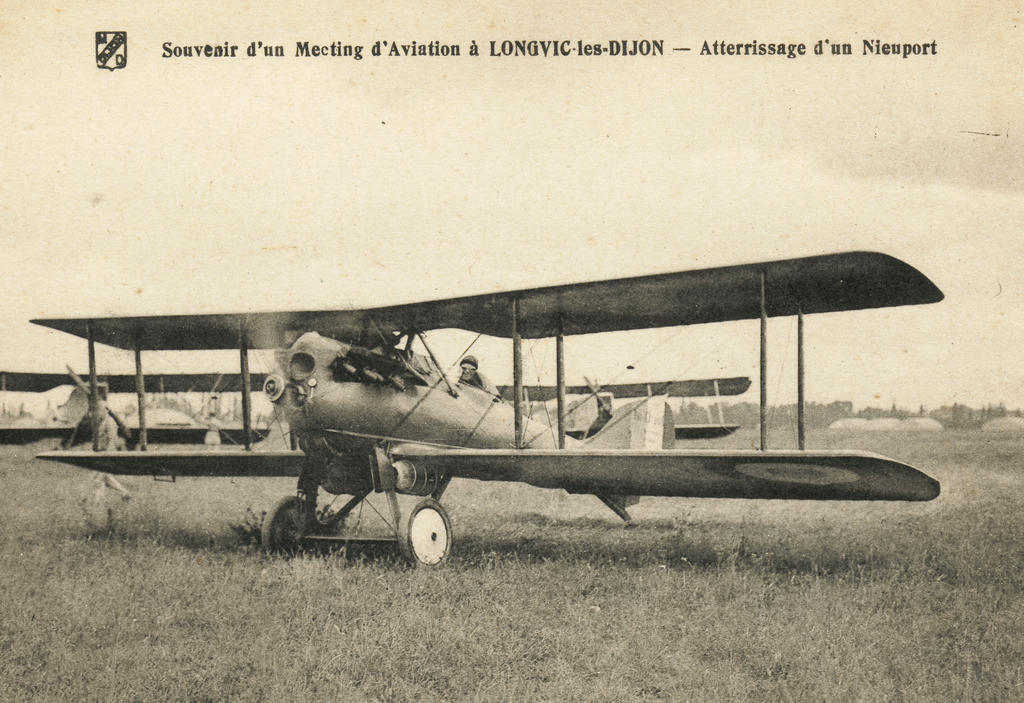
Nieuport-Delage 29 C.1

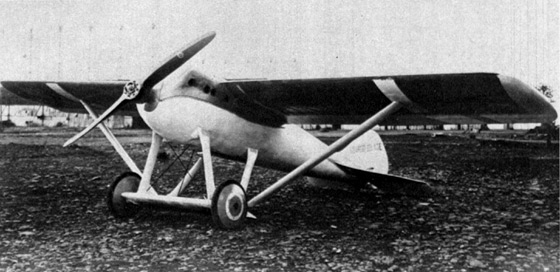
Nieuport-Delage Sesquiplan

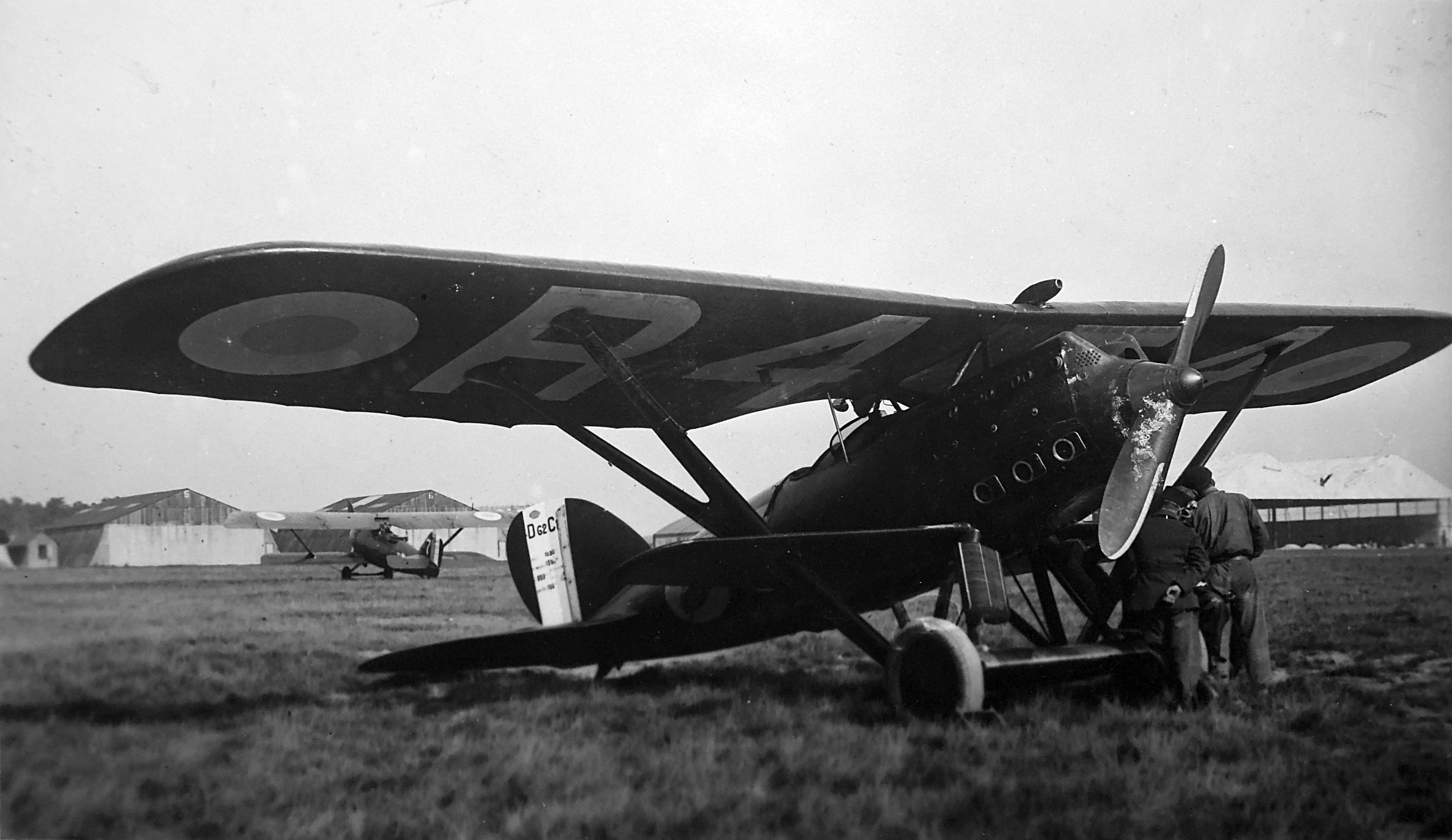
Nieuport-Delage NiD.62

== Surviving aircraft ==
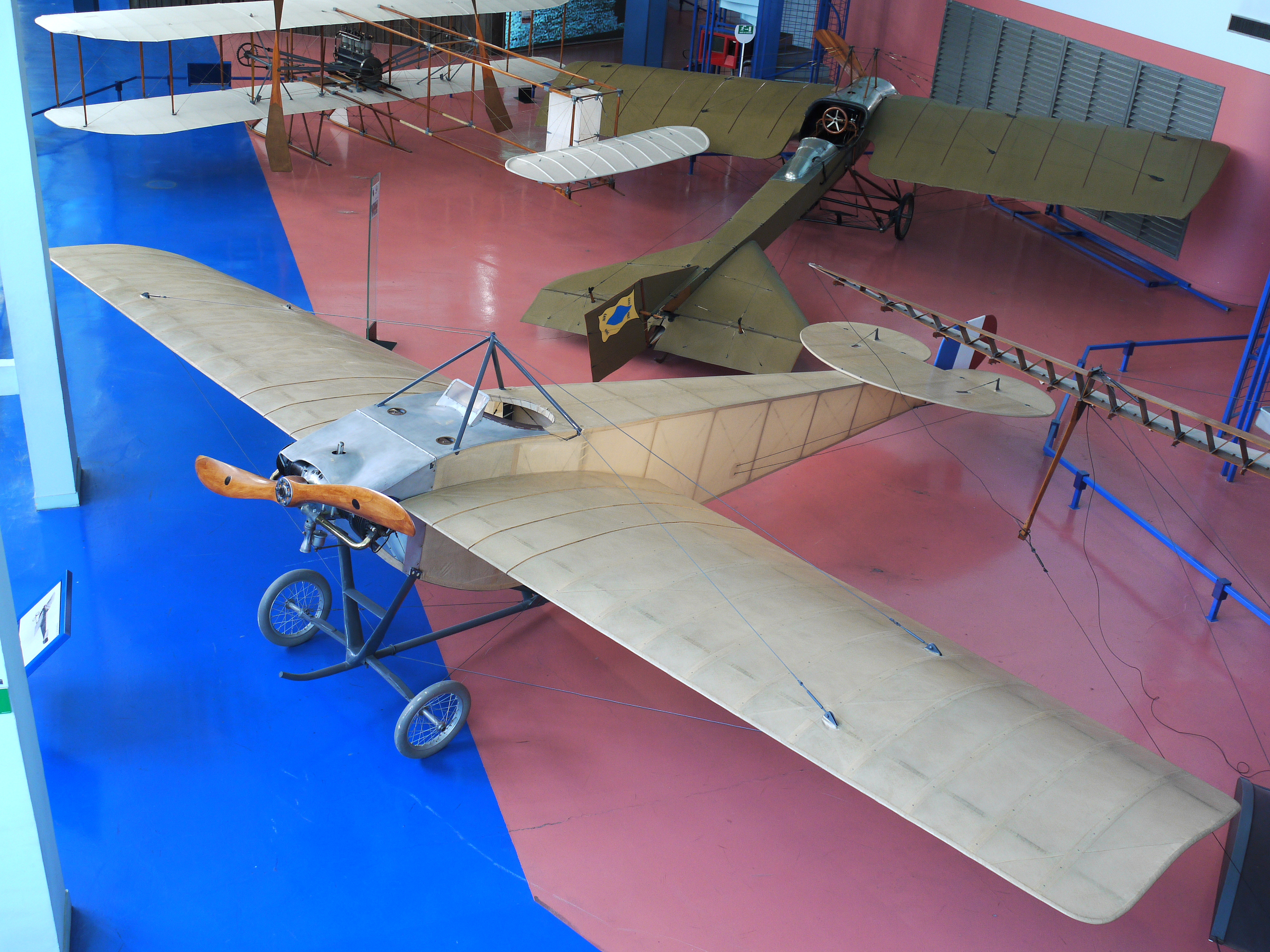

Type	Owner	Location	Notes
Nieuport II.N monoplane	Musée de l'Air et de l'Espace	le Bourget (Paris), France	Late production model, on display
Nieuport IV.G monoplane	Swedish Air Force Museum	Malmen Airbase. Sweden	On display
Nieuport-Macchi 10,000	Museo Storica de Guerra	Rovereto, Italy	Recently restored
Nieuport-Macchi 10,000	Museo della Scienza e della Tecnologia "Leonardo da Vinci"	Milan, Italy	On display
Nieuport 11 C.1	Musée de l'Air et de l'Espace	le Bourget, France	On display
Nieuport 12 A.2	Canada Aviation and Space Museum	Ottawa, Canada	French example gifted to Canada. Restored and on display
Nieuport 23 C.1	Royal Museum of the Armed Forces and of Military History	Brussels, Belgium	Recently restored, on display
Nieuport 28 C.1	National Air and Space Museum	Washington, D.C.	Recently restored
Nieuport 28 C.1	National Museum of the United States Air Force	Dayton, Ohio	On display
Nieuport 28 C.1	National Naval Aviation Museum	NAS Pensacola, Florida	On display as USN aircraft
Nieuport 28 C.1	Swiss Air Force Museum	Dübendorf, Switzerland	On display as Swiss Air Force aircraft
Nieuport-Delage NiD.29 C.1	Musée de l'Air et de l'Espace	le Bourget, France	In storage
Nieuport 83 E.2 trainer	Old Rhinebeck Aerodrome	Rhinebeck, New York	Poor condition, on display
