= Nieuport-Delage Sesquiplan =

Series of 1920s French racing monoplanes

Sesquiplan
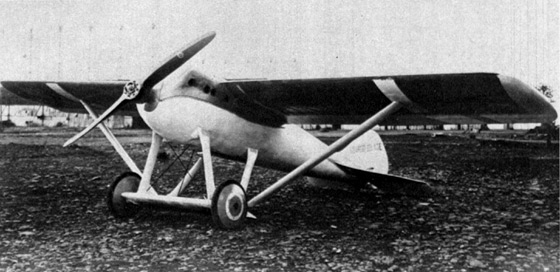
- The world record setting NiD 41 Sesquiplan 'Eugène Gilbert'

General information
- Type: Racing monoplane
- National origin: France
- Manufacturer: Nieuport-Delage
- Number built: 2

History
- First flight: 1921

The Nieuport-Delage Sesquiplans were a series of 1920s French racing monoplanes built by Nieuport-Delage. It was the first aircraft to be recorded as achieving 200 mph (321.88 km/h) in level flight and it established a world air speed record in 1923, attaining an airspeed of 205.2 mph (330.275 km/h).

== Development ==
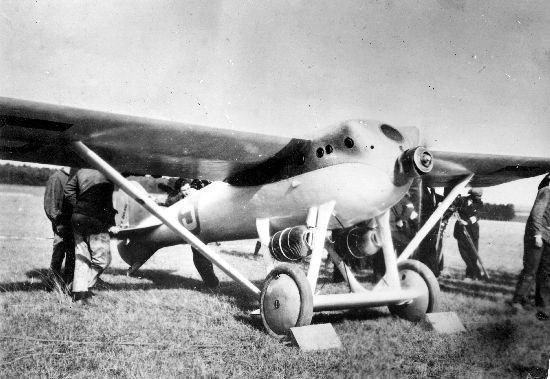
Nieuport-Delage Sesquiplane racer with twin Lamblin radiators under the fuselage

The Sesquiplane first appeared in 1921, a development of the Nieuport 31 fighter. It was a sleek shoulder-wing braced monoplane powered by a supercharged 8 cylinder 224 kW (300 hp) Hispano-Suiza 8Fb engine. The name Sesquiplane was due to the additional aerofoil that was attached to the axle of the fixed conventional landing gear.

Two Sesquiplans were built and both were entered into the Coupe Deutsch de la Meurthe speed event held at Etampes in October 1921. The aircraft flown by Sadi-Lecointe crashed during the race but the other, piloted by Georges Kirsch, won at an average speed of 278.36 km/h (173 mph). These Sesquiplans had a span of 8.0 m (26 ft 4 in), a wing area of 10.0 m^{2} (107.6 sq ft), a length of 6.1 m (20 ft 0 in) and a loaded weight of 898 kg (1,980 lb). The following year Lacointe crashed again in a Sesquiplan with a new squared off wing of similar span and with a Göttingen 416 airfoil section replacing the original wing, having set a new world record speed of 325 kmh (202 mph) over 100 km (62 mi). The surviving aircraft was modified with a 400 hp (298 kW) Wright Hispano H-3 engine and a revised vertical tail, possibly becoming the Nieuport NiD 41 (sources differ on the identity of the NiD 41) and named Eugène Gilbert. Flush radiators made of thin corrugated brass welded together covered most of the wing and replaced the Lamblin radiators used previously. In February 1923 Lecointe set a new world speed record of 375 kmh (233 mph) at Istres in it.

The last racing Sesquiplan, the Nieuport-Delage NiD 42 S was a new design, fitted with a 12-cylinder 447 kW (600 hp) Hispano 12Hb engine. In June 1924 Lecointe won the Coupe Beaumont in it averaging a speed of 311 km/h (193 mph) over the 300 km course. He did not stop at the end of the course but continued to cover 500 km in total at an average of 306 km/h (190 mph), a new record for that distance.

== Specifications (Eugène Gilbert) ==
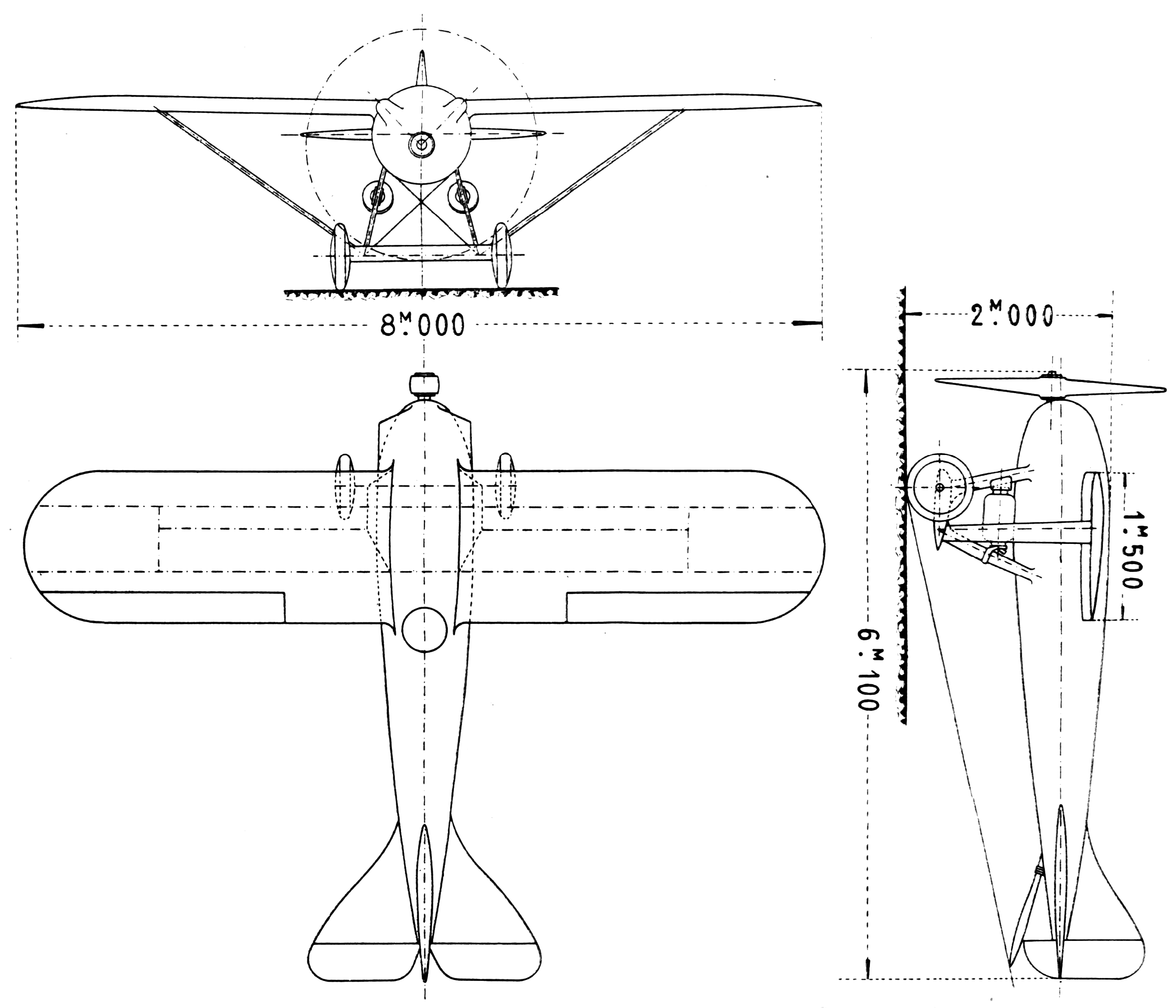
Nieuport Delage Sesquiplan 3-view drawing from L'Aerophile September,1921

Data from Hartmann p.31

General characteristics

- Crew: 1
- Length: 7.80 m (25 ft 7 in)
- Wingspan: 8.20 m (26 ft 11 in)
- Wing area: 12.70 m^{2} (136.7 sq ft)
- Empty weight: 800 kg (1,764 lb)
- Gross weight: 1,000 kg (2,205 lb)
- Powerplant: 1 × Wright-Hispano H-3 water-cooled upright V-8, 300 kW (400 hp)

Performance

- Maximum speed: 300 km/h (190 mph, 160 kn) or more
- Range: 400 km (250 mi, 220 nmi)

== See also ==
Aircraft of comparable role, configuration, and era

- Letov Š-8
- Navy-Wright NW
