= Nieuport-Delage NiD 38 =

NiD 38

General information
- Type: Touring aircraft
- National origin: France
- Manufacturer: Nieuport-Delage
- Number built: 4

History
- Introduction date: Compagnie Aérienne Française
- First flight: 1924

The Nieuport-Delage NiD 38 was a touring aircraft built in small numbers in France in the early 1920s. It was a single-bay biplane of conventional design with an enclosed cabin for two passengers and an open cockpit for the pilot.

The prototype was exhibited at the 1924 Salon de l'Aéronautique in Paris, and orders for four machines were placed by the airline Compagnie Aérienne Française. Two of these had their passenger compartments replaced by mail holds, and were used on the Geneva–Bordeaux airmail route.

== Variants ==
- NiD 38 - production version with Hispano-Suiza 8Ab engine (3 built)
  - NiD 381 - version with Renault 8Gd (1 built)

== Operators ==
- France
  - Compagnie Aérienne Française

== Specifications (NiD 38) ==
Data from aviafrance.com

General characteristics

- Crew: One pilot
- Capacity: 2 passengers
- Length: 8.11 m (26 ft 7 in)
- Wingspan: 10.90 m (35 ft 9 in)
- Height: 3.46 m (11 ft 4 in)
- Wing area: 40.3 m^{2} (434 sq ft)
- Empty weight: 950 kg (2,090 lb)
- Gross weight: 1,350 kg (2,970 lb)
- Powerplant: 1 × Hispano-Suiza 8Ab , 130 kW (180 hp)

Performance

- Maximum speed: 160 km/h (100 mph, 87 kn)
- Range: 350 km (220 mi, 190 nmi)
- Service ceiling: 4,000 m (13,000 ft)
