= Nieuport Triplane =

French fighter prototype

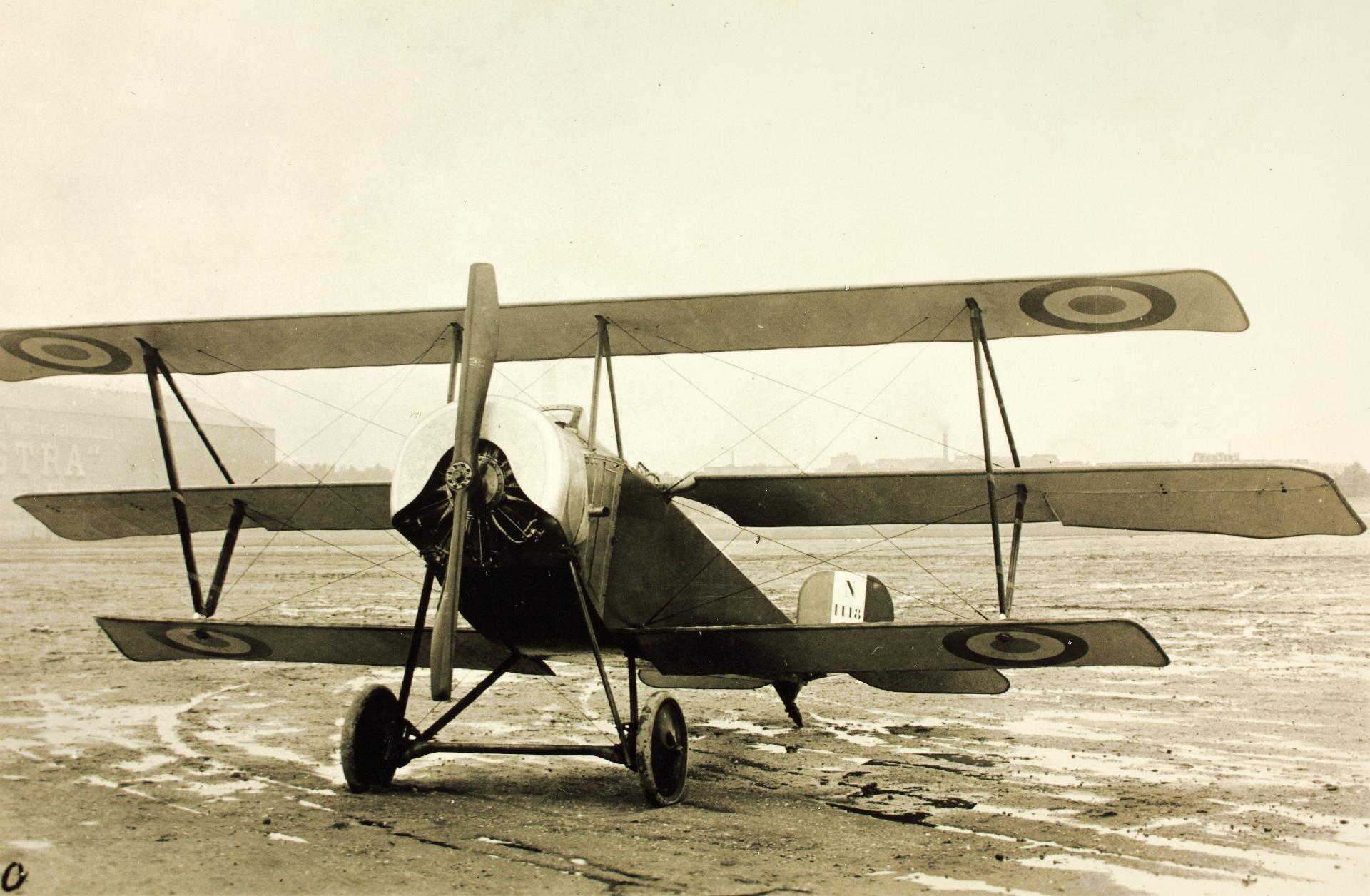
- Nieport 10 Triplane at Issy-les-Moulineaux airfield, c. 1916

General information
- Type: Experimental aircraft
- National origin: France
- Manufacturer: Nieuport
- Number built: 3 or 4

History
- Developed from: Nieuport 10, 17, and 17bis

The Nieuport Triplanes were a series of experimental stagger-wing triplanes modified from Nieuport 10, 17 and 17bis biplanes during World War I that were built by Nieuport. The exact number built is unknown, but only three or four are known to have been evaluated by the French Army Aviation (Aviation Militaire) and the British Royal Flying Corps (RFC) and Royal Naval Air Service (RNAS). None of the aircraft were superior to the fighters already in service and they were not accepted for production.

== Background ==
Nieuport's chief designer, Gustave Delage, invented a novel staggered triplane wing structure in 1915 in which each of the three wings was supported by a single triangular interplane strut with each wing located at an apex of the triangle. Each wing had a single spar and a narrow chord. He believed that this arrangement would minimize the number of drag-inducing struts and bracing wires needed, improve stability and increase lift.

=== Nieuport 10 Triplane ===
Delage first tried out his design by modifying a two-seat Nieuport 10 equipped with a 90-horsepower (67 kW) Le Rhône 9C rotary engine. The upper wing was positioned in front of the pilot, connected to the fuselage by a pair of inverted V struts. The middle wing was the longest of the three and its spar passed through the top of the fuselage between the two cockpits. It was the only wing fitted with ailerons. The bottom wing had moderate dihedral and was the shortest of the three. It was positioned ahead of the middle wing with its leading edge roughly in line with the trailing edge of the upper wing. Both the middle and lower wings had cutouts at the wing roots to improve the downward visibility of the pilot and observer.

The aircraft was tested by the French Army Aviation in 1916, although no data has survived. Its performance may not have been unsatisfactory as Nieuport was authorized to produce a fighter model later that year.

=== Nieuport 17 Triplane ===
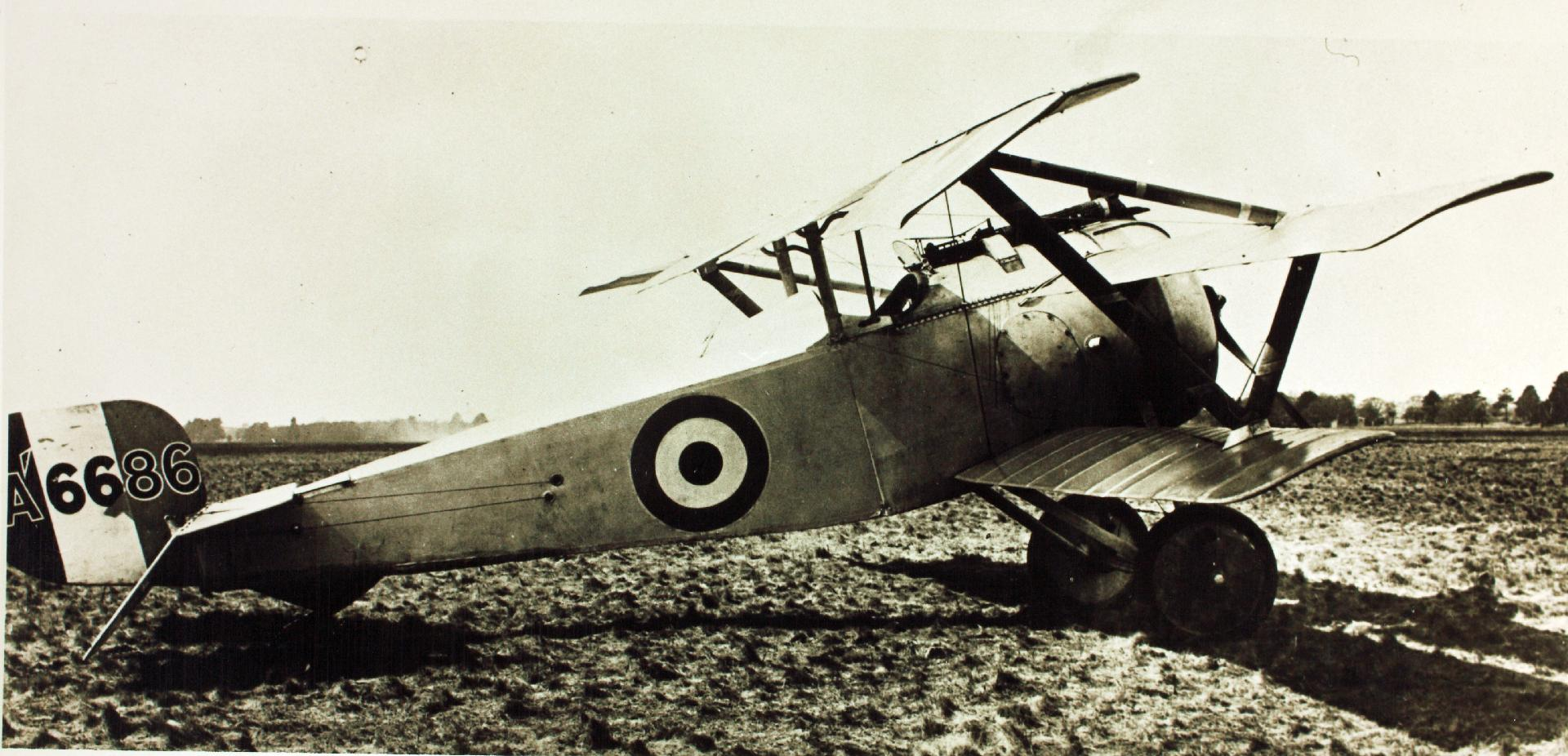
Nieuport 17 Triplane showing its unusual wing stagger

Delage based his next triplane, serial numbered N1388, on a single-seat Nieuport 17 biplane that was armed with a synchronized Lewis machine gun forward of the pilot. It was powered by a 110-horsepower (82 kW) Le Rhône 9J rotary fitted with Nieuport's cone de penetration. (Note: This was a spinner that was not attached to the propeller and could rotate freely.) In this aircraft Delage reversed the positions of the upper and middle wings, with the upper wing now mounted above and to the rear of the cockpit. The middle wing was the furthest forward of the three with its leading edge just behind the engine cowling. Despite cutouts at its roots, the wing blocked much of the pilot's downward view. Additionally, the ailerons were transferred to the upper wings.

N1388 was tested by the French in late 1916 and it was declared obsolete in November. The RFC acquired N1388, now armed with a French version of the Vickers machine gun that was incompatible with British ammunition, in January 1917 and began testing it on the orders of Brigadier-General Hugh Tenchard, commander of the RFC in France. Reserialled as A6686, it performed time-to-height tests up to 10,000 ft (3,000 m) on 2 February and demonstrated times that were slightly superior to those of the Nieuport 17. Trenchard then ordered the aircraft transferred to England for more thorough testing which was conducted in March and April.

The RFC summary report showed the triplane with a pressurized 13.5-imperial-gallon (61 L; 16.2 US gal) fuel tank behind the cockpit, a 9-imperial-gallon (41 L; 11 US gal) gravity-fed tank in front of the pilot as well as a 4.5-imperial-gallon (20 L; 5.4 US gal) lubricating oil tank. The test pilots judged longitudinal stability to be "not very good" and directional stability to be lacking. They assessed controllability to be "good" around all three axes. On the ground, taxiing was "not very good"; it was very tail-heavy and difficult to land well due to a tendency to slew around. Overall they found "the performance of this machine is considerably inferior to that of modern English fighting scouts".

The ultimate fate of A6686 is unknown, but it is possible that it was transferred to the RNAS as N532 which appears in surviving documentation without an engine on 7 June 1917, the RNAS having a shortage of the Le Rhône 9J engines at that time. N532 appears to have been assigned to No. 10 and No. 11 Squadrons of the RNAS and was discarded in February 1918.

=== Nieuport 17bis triplane ===
The RNAS acquired another triplane directly from the French in early 1917. This was based on a Nieuport 17bis airframe with the 130-horsepower (97 kW) Clerget 9B rotary engine and was allotted the serial number N521. The fighter retained the same wing layout as the earlier single seater. A second aircraft, serialled N522, had been ordered by the RNAS, but it was cancelled. Comparative trials between N521 and a standard Nieuport 17bis from No. 11 Squadron RNAS were flown in April which revealed that the triplane was 3–4 knots (5.6–7.4 km/h; 3.5–4.6 mph) faster than the biplane at ground level. The biplane may have been equipped with a 110-horsepower (82 kW) Clerget engine which would have caused the slight superiority in speed rather than any merit of the design. N521 briefly saw service with No 11 Squadron in May and June before being transferred to the RNAS air depot as unserviceable by 27 June. It was approved for disposal three days later.

== Specifications (Nieuport 17 Triplane) ==
Data from The Complete Book of Fighters: An Illustrated Encyclopedia of Every Fighter Built and Flown; French Warplanes of WWI: A Centennial Perspective on Great War Airplanes; Volume 1: Fighters

General characteristics

- Crew: one
- Length: 5.85 m (19 ft 2 in)
- Wingspan: 8.01 m (26 ft 3 in)
- Height: 2.26 m (7 ft 5 in)
- Wing area: 13.3 m^{2} (143 sq ft)
- Empty weight: 417 kg (919 lb)
- Gross weight: 629 kg (1,387 lb)
- Powerplant: 1 × Le Rhône 9Ja 9-cylinder rotary engine, 82 kW (110 hp)
- Propellers: 2-bladed fixed-pitch wooden Lavasseur 484

Performance

- Maximum speed: 176 km/h (109 mph, 95 kn)
- Endurance: 2.5 hours
- Service ceiling: 5,110 m (16,750 ft)
- Time to altitude: 13.6 min to 3,000 m (10,000 ft)

Armament

- Guns: 1 × synchronised 7.7 mm (.303 in) Vickers machine gun

== Bibliography ==
- Davilla, Dr. James J. & Soltan, Arthur M. (1997). French Aircraft of the First World War. Stratford, Connecticut: Flying Machines Press. ISBN 0-9637110-4-0.
- Green, William & Swanborough, Gordon (2001) [1994]. The Complete Book of Fighters: An Illustrated Encyclopedia of Every Fighter Built and Flown (Revised and Updated ed.). London: Salamander Books. ISBN 1-84065-269-1.
- Owers, Colin A. (2020). French Warplanes of WWI: A Centennial Perspective on Great War Airplanes. Great War Aviation Centennial Series (43). Vol. 1: Fighters. n.p.: Aeronaut Books. ISBN 978-1-935881-93-3.
