= Siemens-Schuckert D.I =

Type of aircraft

D.I
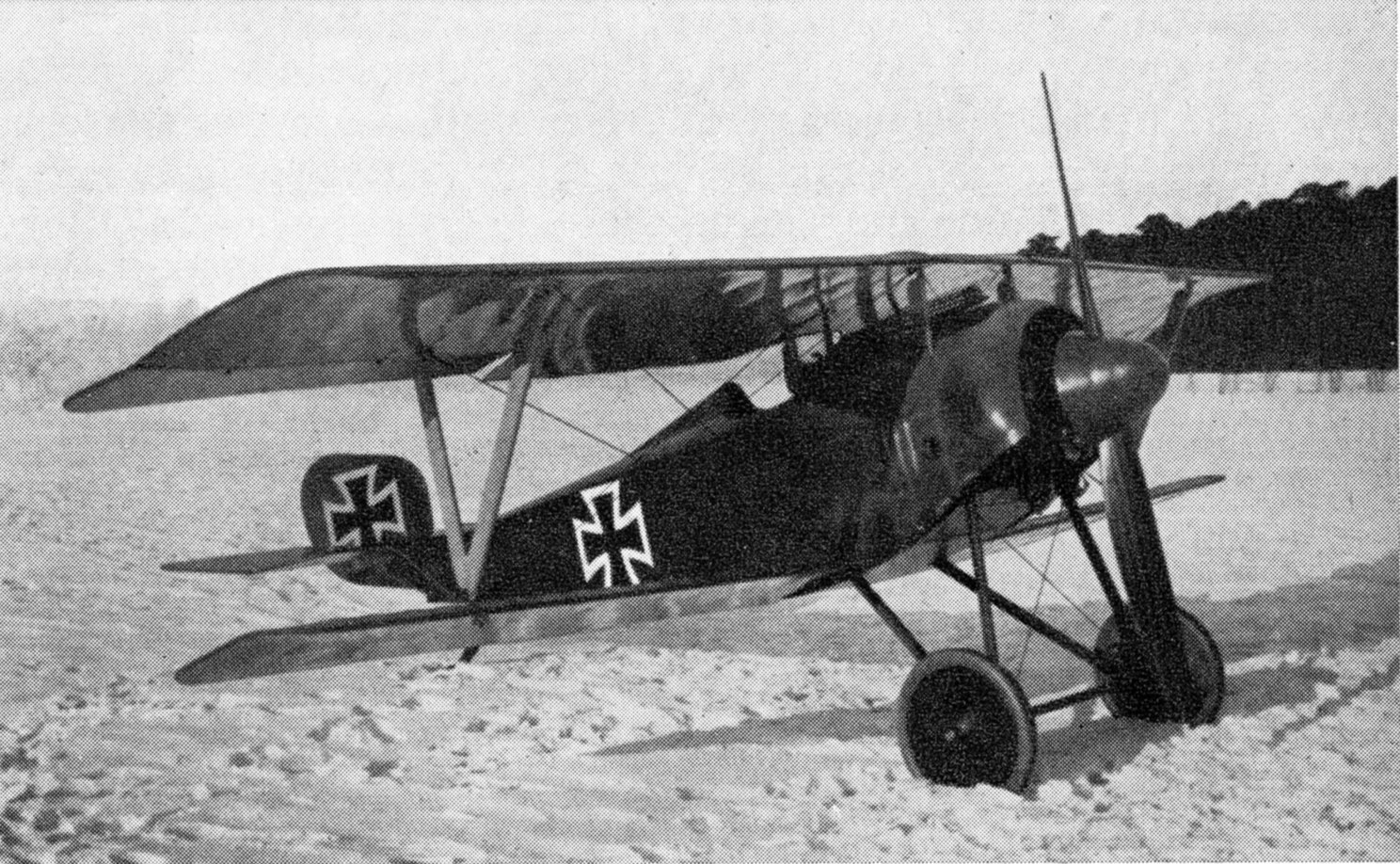

General information
- Type: Single-seat biplane fighter
- Manufacturer: Siemens-Schuckert Werke
- Primary user: Luftstreitkräfte
- Number built: 95

History
- Introduction date: 1917
- First flight: 1916
- Developed from: Nieuport 17

The Siemens-Schuckert D.I was a single-seat fighter built by Siemens-Schuckert Werke in 1916. It was a German copy of the French Nieuport 17 that was obsolete by the time it was available in numbers, so that it served mainly as an advanced trainer.

== Design and development ==
The French Nieuport 17 fighter, which reached the front in March 1916, established such ascendency over existing German fighters that captured examples were supplied to several German aircraft manufacturers with a request to "study" the type. The Siemens-Schuckert Werke produced the D.I, based very closely on the Nieuport. The most important difference from the Nieuport 17 was the powerplant - instead of the Le Rhone 9J of the Nieuport (licensed, as with the Oberursel Ur.II; and un-licensed versions of which were actually available in Germany at the time), Siemens-Schukert chose to use their own 110 hp (82 kW) Siemens-Halske Sh.I rotary engine - in which the cylinders, still attached to the propeller, rotated at 900 rpm in one direction, with the crankshaft and internals rotating in the opposite direction at the same rate: producing an effective 1800 rpm. Visually, the effect of this was that in place of the Nieuport 17's circular, fully "closed" cowling the D.I had a small, close-fitting, semicircular cowling with an open bottom, to allow adequate cooling for the slow revving Siemens-Halske. This gives some photographs of the type the appearance of the earlier Nieuport 11.

The wing area (14.4 m²) was a little less than the famous 15 m² of the Nieuport - the gap between the wings was reduced slightly, and the interplane struts were of steel tube, with broad wooden fairings, in place of the tape wrapped wooden struts of the original.

== Production history ==
An order for 150 aircraft for the Luftstreitkräfte was placed on 25 November 1916, but initial deliveries were slow, due to production difficulties with the complicated geared engines, so that the type was not available for service until well into 1917, by which time many Jagdstaffeln were already equipped with the very much superior Albatros D.III. A backup order for a further 100 machines, placed on 21 March 1917, was cancelled, and only 95 were produced in total.

Late production models were fitted with modified tailskids, and had large pointed spinners on their propellers.

== Operational history ==
The S.S.W. D.I was obsolete before it was available in numbers, so that most of the examples produced were sent to the fighter training schools, although a few Jastas received one or two examples during 1917.

The type is poorly documented - in particular no reliable details are available for its performance: the published figures are essentially those of the Nieuport 11, whereas such a close copy of the 17, with a powerplant of similar output, might have been expected to have a performance roughly equivalent to that of the original from which it was derived.

== Variants ==
A single D.Ia was produced with a greater wing area - two examples of the D.Ib had a higher compression version of the Siemens-Halske Sh.I. Neither was ordered into production. Development continued through a series of D.II prototypes to the Siemens-Schuckert D.III.

== Operators ==
German Empire

- Luftstreitkräfte

== Specifications(D.I) ==
Data from German Aircraft of the First World War, The Illustrated Encyclopedia of Aircraft (Part Work 1982-1985), The Complete Book of Fighters

General characteristics

- Crew: 1
- Length: 6 m (19 ft 8 in)
- Wingspan: 7.5 m (24 ft 7 in)
- Height: 2.59 m (8 ft 6 in)
- Wing area: 14.4 m^{2} (155 sq ft)
- Empty weight: 430 kg (948 lb)
- Gross weight: 675 kg (1,488 lb)
- Powerplant: 1 × Siemens-Halske Sh.I 9-cylinder contra-rotating air-cooled rotary piston engine, 82 kW (110 hp)
- Propellers: 2-bladed fixed-pitch propeller

Performance

- Maximum speed: 155 km/h (96 mph, 84 kn)
- Endurance: 2 hours 20 minutes
- Time to altitude: 4,000 m (13,000 ft) 24 minutes 18 seconds

Armament

- Guns: One or two 7.92 mm (0.312 in) LMG 08/15 machine guns

== See also ==
- Euler D.I
