= Nieuport 17 =

French WW1 fighter aircraft

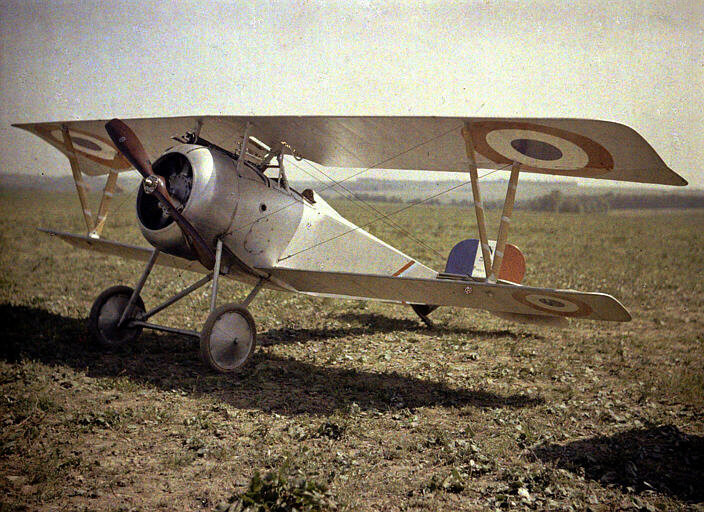

General information
- Type: Fighter
- National origin: France
- Manufacturer: Nieuport
- Status: Retired
- Primary users: Aéronautique Militaire Imperial Russian Air Service; Royal Flying Corps
- Number built: c. 3,600

History
- Introduction date: March 1916
- First flight: January 1916
- Developed from: Nieuport 11
- Variants: Nieuport 17bis, Nieuport 21

The Nieuport 17 C.1 (or Nieuport XVII C.1 in contemporary sources) is a French sesquiplane fighter designed and manufactured by the Nieuport company during World War I. An improvement over the Nieuport 11, it was a little larger than earlier Nieuports and better adapted to the more powerful engine than the interim Nieuport 16. Aside from early examples, it had the new Alkan-Hamy synchronization gear, permitting the use of a fuselage-mounted synchronised Vickers gun firing through the propeller disc.

At the time of its introduction in March 1916, the type's outstanding manoeuvrability and excellent rate of climb gave it a significant advantage over fighters on both sides and was described as "the best pursuit plane of the day". It was used by many operators and entered service with every Allied power and copies were also operated by the Deutsche Luftstreitkräfte (German Air Service). Mass-produced by several French firms, the Nieuport 17 and its derivatives were built under licence in Italy by Nieuport-Macchi and in Russia by Dux. Unlicensed copies, notably the Siemens-Schuckert D.I and the Euler D.I, were produced in Germany.

The Nieuport 21 and 23 represented relatively minor alterations. Aerodynamic refinement led to the Clerget-powered 17bis. More powerful versions of the Le Rhône rotary engines with detail improvements resulted in the Nieuport 24, 24bis and 27.

== Development ==
=== Origins ===
When Gustave Delage was appointed as the chief designer of Nieuport, in January 1914, a series of sesquiplane designs followed. Nieuport had been famous for wire-braced monoplanes and these had reached the limit of their development. The sesquiplane configuration was adopted by Delage as a compromise between the low drag of a monoplane and the greater strength of a biplane. The first of Delage's sesquiplanes was the two-seat Nieuport 10 of 1914, which was followed the next year by the smaller Nieuport 11 single-seater, which in turn was supplemented by the Nieuport 16. The larger engine of the latter aircraft made it nose heavy and increased the wing loading, especially when armed with a synchronised Vickers gun.

Developed in parallel with the conservative Nieuport 16, the Nieuport 17 was slightly larger with longer wings and fuselage, improved aerodynamic form and better balance. It was fitted with the 110 hp (82 kW) Le Rhône 9J engine and later examples used 120 hp (89 kW) motors.

=== Design ===
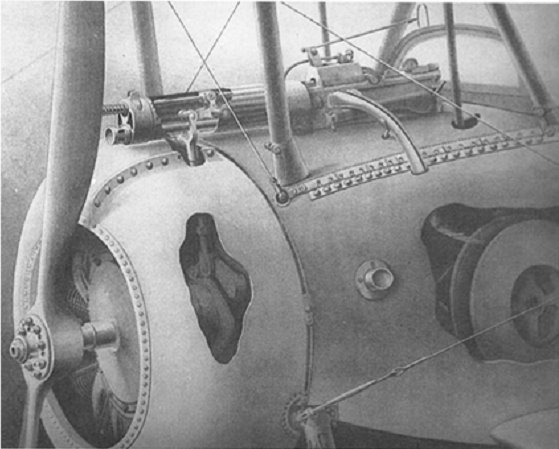
The Alkan-Hamy synchronization gear installed in a Nieuport 17

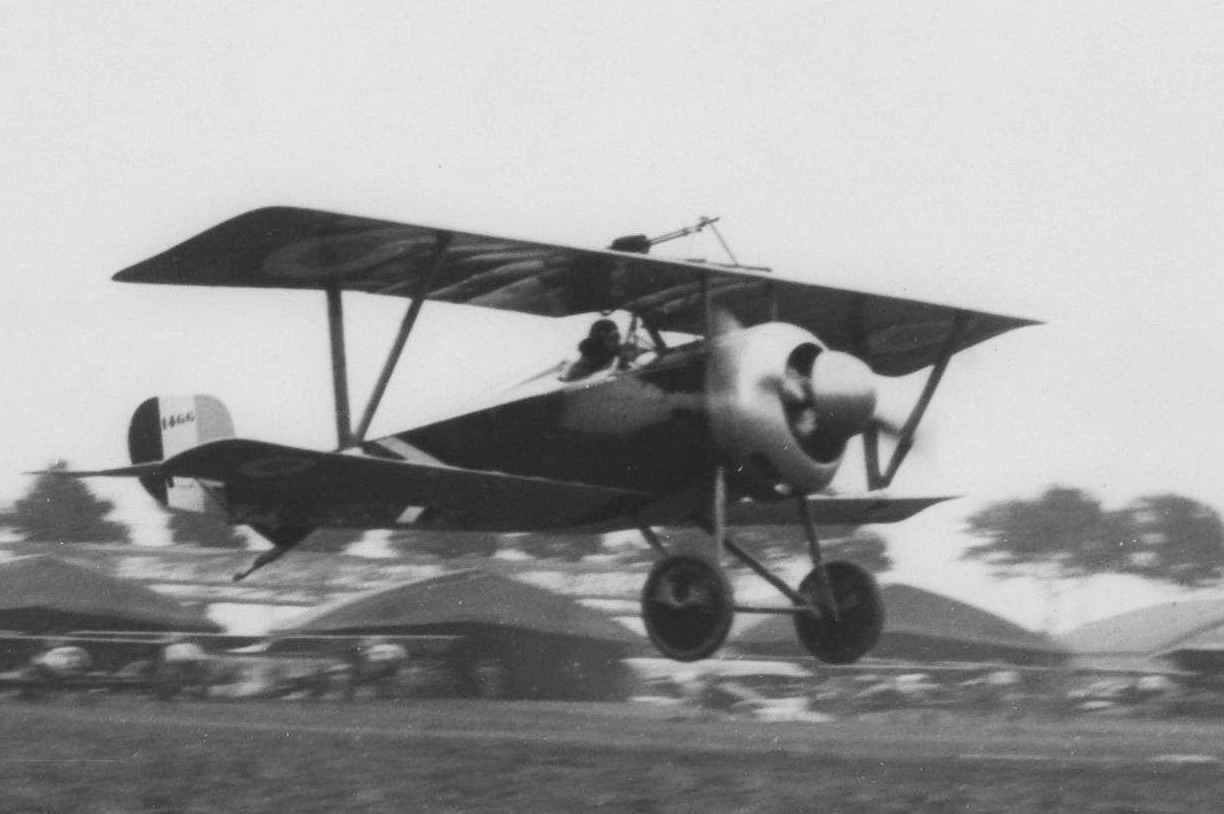
Early Nieuport 17 in July 1916 with Lewis gun and a cône de penetration

The upper wings of the Nieuport sesquiplanes used a typical structure for the period, with widely spaced spars connected with full chord ribs and compression ribs, cross-braced internally with wire and by riblets on the leading edge. The lower wing's single spar was directly below the rear spar of the upper wing and was braced with a characteristic Vee strut. The ribs, composed of ash flanges and limewood webs, featured cut-outs to lighten them. Ailerons were fitted on the top wing only and had increased chord towards the wingtips for improved stall response. They were actuated by a pair of push-pull rods that connected torque tubes running to the ailerons to the control column in the cockpit. The horizontal stabilizer, elevator and rudder were built up from welded 20 mm (0.79 in) diameter steel tube and controls for these were provided via conventional cables and pulleys. The angle of incidence on the wings could be adjusted by ground crew via a single pivot joint arrangement, which was originally intended to allow the lower wing to be rotated for low speed flight on the Nieuport 10, but was never used. No adjustment was provided for the tailplane.

Quite apart from the improvement in the pilot's downward view, there were aerodynamic gains from the reduction in area of the lower wing, which on a biplane produces far less lift than the upper wing, yet causes considerable drag. This helped give sesquiplanes a superior climb rate. Unfortunately at very high speeds (at what would now be termed its V_{NE}, or "velocity, never exceed") the lower wing was prone to flutter, an aerodynamic phenomenon not fully understood at the time. The single spar was behind the centre of lift, which at high speeds could cause the lower wing to twist, increasing the angle of attack until the wing stalled, at which point it would return to its normal position, repeating until the wing snapped or the pilot slowed the aircraft.

British Nieuports were modified at No 2 Aeroplane Supply Depot to alleviate this problem. Late in French service, some N.17s had their lower wings replaced with spares intended for the newer Nieuport 24.

The fuselage of the 17 was built around four ash longerons which tapered from the rectangular sheet steel engine mounting to the rudder post, with the upper longerons bowed around the cockpit, giving most of the fuselage a trapezoid cross section. This was braced with spruce struts held with diagonal bracing wires and steel plate joints. The sides and top of the forward fuselage were covered in light molded plywood panels while the rear fuselage sides were covered in fabric. Behind the pilot was a headrest, molded into the plywood top decking, which was supported by longitudinal stringers. The cowling was made of aluminium, had strengthening ribs and a pair of inset holes to provide ventilation and egress of the engine exhaust underneath. It was faired with the forward fuselage via molded side pieces. A cône de penetration (casserole de helice), resembling a spinner that didn't spin, was bolted to the front of the stationary engine crankshaft on some early examples but was generally dispensed with on later machines

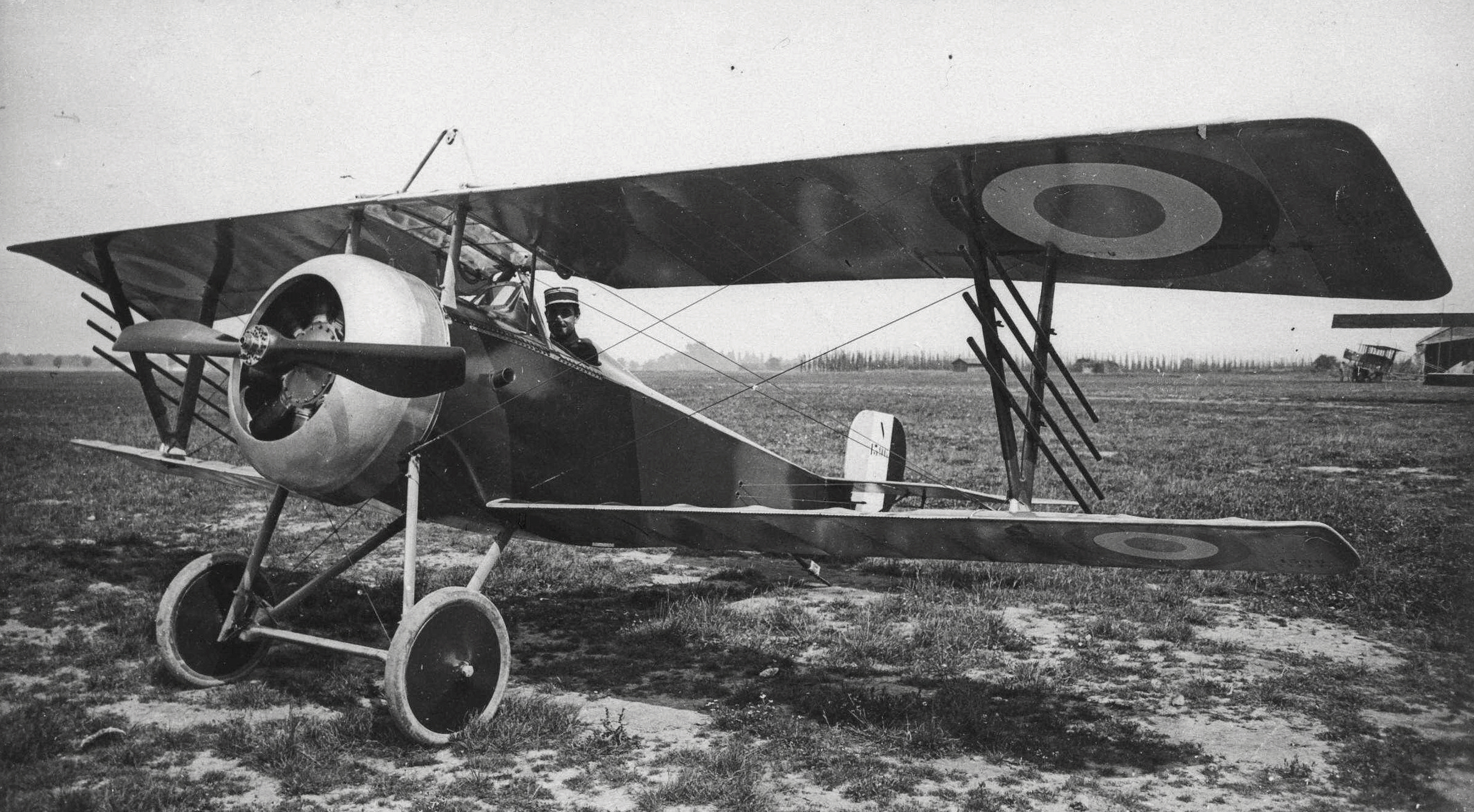
Early camouflaged Nieuport 17 fitted with over-wing gun and Le Prieur rocket tubes

Production of the new Alkan-Hamy synchronization gear permitted the wing-mounted Lewis gun on the earliest examples to be replaced with a synchronised Vickers gun mounted on the fuselage to fire through the propeller arc. The standard Royal Flying Corps synchroniser, the Vickers-Challenger gear, was unreliable and unpopular with pilots, so that in British service the over-wing Lewis gun was retained. The Lewis gun was fitted to the new Foster mounting, a curved metal rail which allowed the pilot to slide the gun back to change ammunition drums and to clear jams. Pilots could also aim the gun upwards to shoot into the underside of aircraft above which was used to good effect by several ace pilots.

=== Derivatives ===
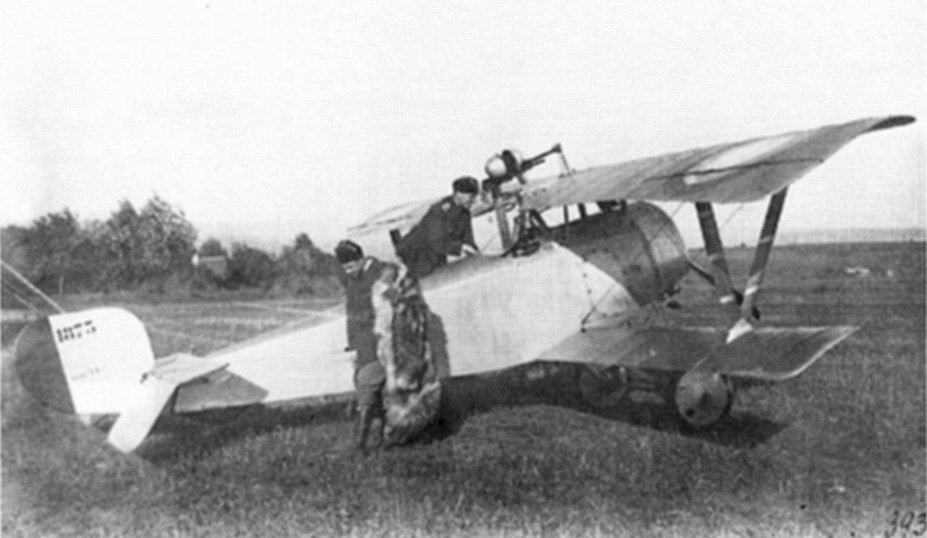
Russian Nieuport 21 armed with a Hotchkiss M1909 machine gun

Entering service in May 1916 but not named until September, the Nieuport 21 differed from the 17 primarily in the adoption of the lower powered 80 hp (60 kW) Le Rhône 9C or 90 hp (67 kW) Le Rhône 9Ga engine. This increased endurance and reduced wing loading and was useful for a high-altitude bomber escort but it was rarely employed as such. In French and especially Russian service, the 21 was commonly used with the Nieuport 17 in the same general fighter role, although it was also useful as an advanced trainer. The 21 has commonly been mistaken for the earlier Nieuport 11, as both lacked headrests and used the same cowling and engines, particularly when some Nieuport 11s were also fitted with molded fuselage sides. Like the 17, the 21 is larger and can be identified by the flying wires, which restrain the upper wings. On the 11 the flying wires merged to a single point, while on the 21 they ran parallel to different points on the lower fuselage.

The Nieuport 23 was largely the same as the definitive 17, differing mainly in the use of a different machine gun synchronizer. The gun was offset to starboard, the fuel and oil tank arrangement and the center section rigging were changed to suit. Nieuport 23s were operated by both French and British squadrons alongside Nieuport 17s until their replacement by the later Nieuport 24, 24bis and 27.

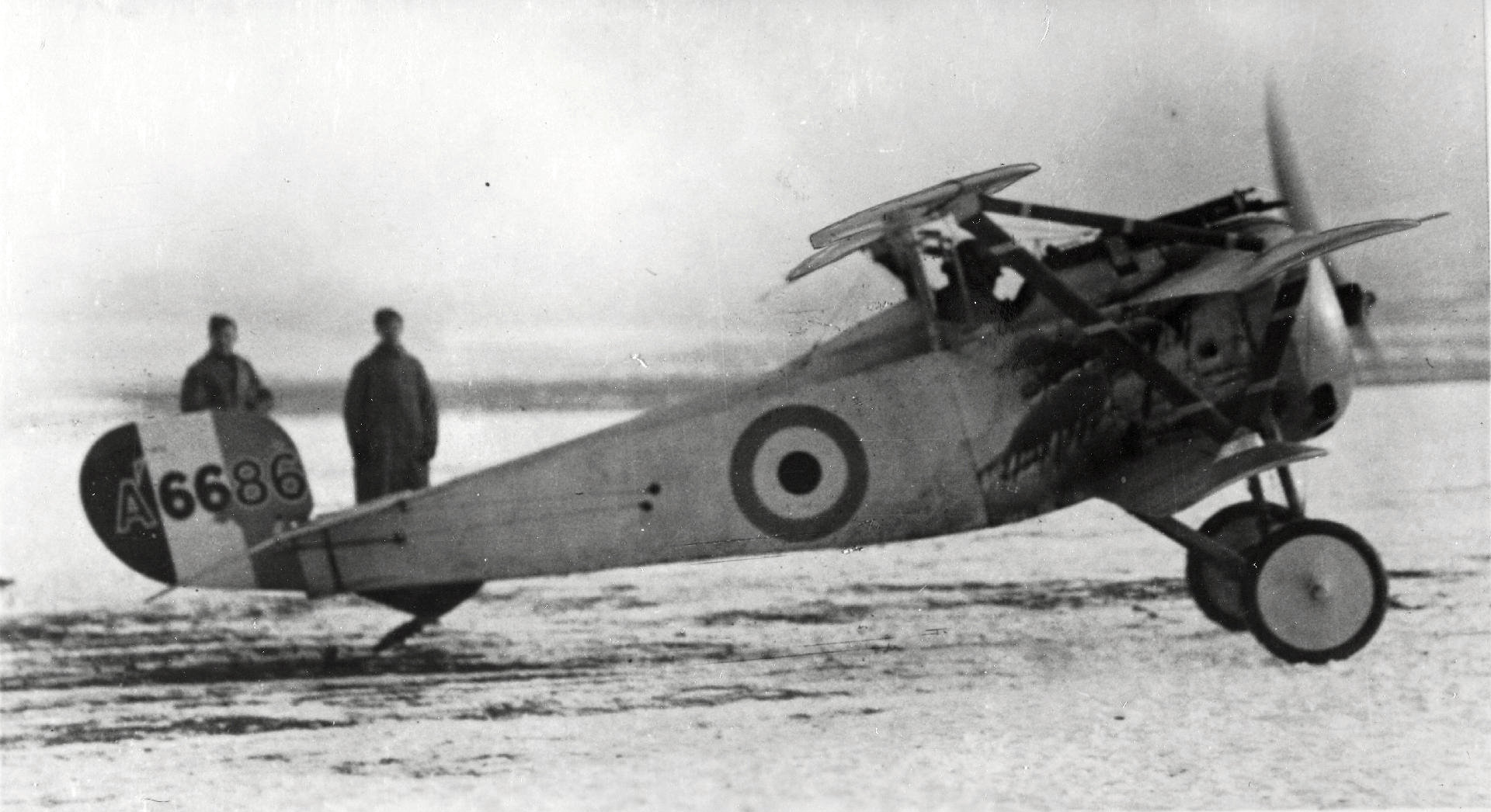
Nieuport 17 triplane undergoing evaluation

The more powerful 130 hp (97 kW) Clerget 9B nine-cylinder rotary engine was used by the Nieuport 17bis, which first appeared late in 1916. The N.17bis had stringers fairing out the fuselage sides compared to the flat sides on the 17. The major user was the British Royal Naval Air Service, which ordered 32 from Nieuport, 50 more being licence-built by the Nieuport & General Aircraft Company. Heavier than the preferred Le Rhône, output from the Clerget rotaries quickly fell below their rated power and the performance of the 17bis suffered accordingly. Armament often included a synchronised Vickers gun with the standard over-wing Lewis.

Related to the 17bis, the Nieuport 23bis combined the aerodynamic improvements of the 17bis but reverted to the Le Rhône. Few were built and the Royal Naval Air Service may have been the sole operator.

A pair of triplanes based on the Nieuport 17 were constructed for testing purposes, one for the French and the other for the British. The narrow chord wings were staggered in an unusual manner, placing the middle wing furthest forward and the top wing furthest aft. No subsequent orders came as a result of these tests. Nieuport later trialled the same layout on the Nieuport 17bis, which was tested by the British Royal Flying Corps and Royal Naval Air Service as well, however this also remained a prototype. During flight testing, both types demonstrated favourable climbing characteristics, but were also found to be relatively tail-heavy.

Several of the experimental Berliner Helicopters, named after their German-American inventor Emile Berliner, were manufactured around Nieuport 23 fuselages, including the 1922 and 1923 versions.

== Operational history ==
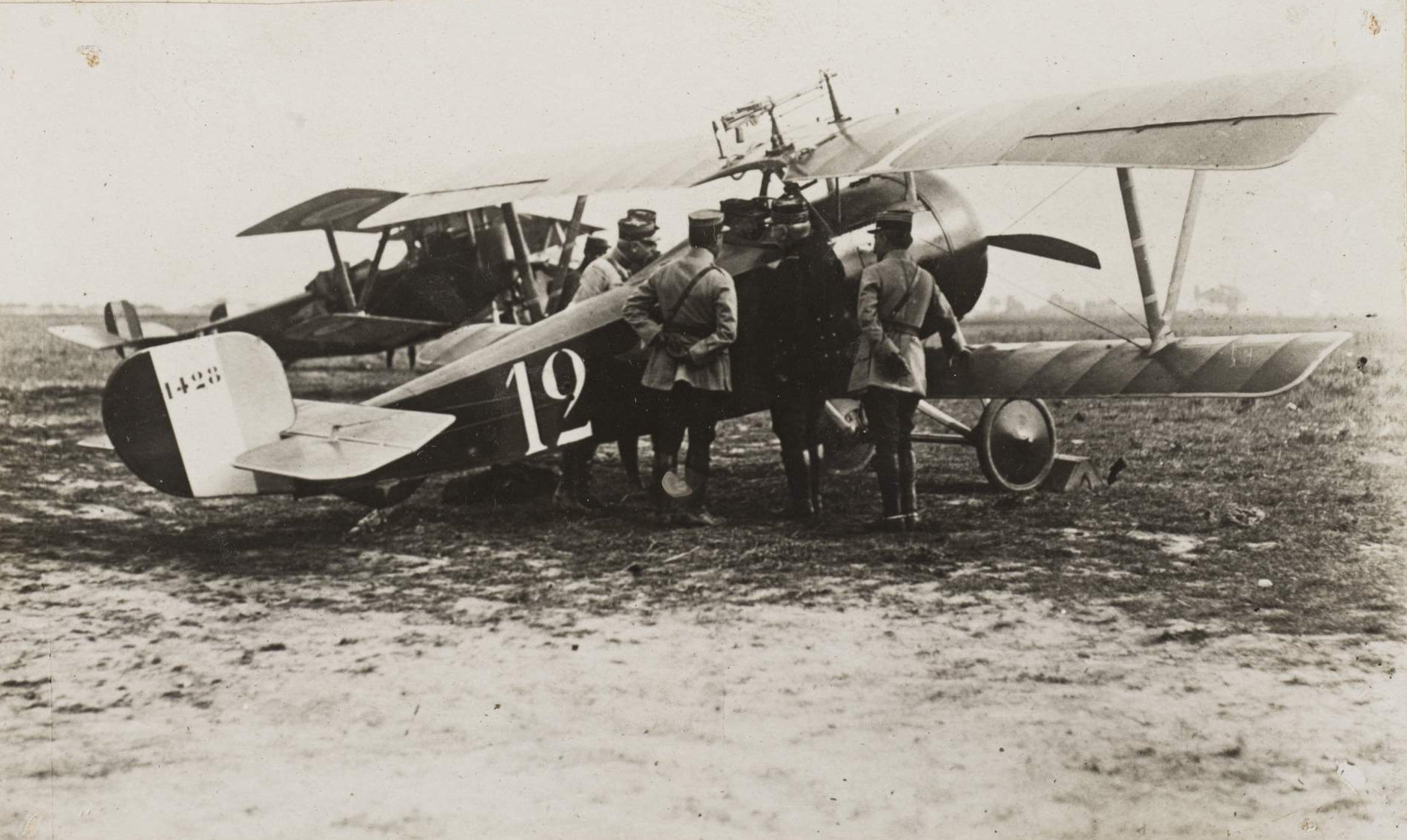
Nieuport 17 flown by René Dorme while with escadrille N.3 during the battle of the Somme, late 1916

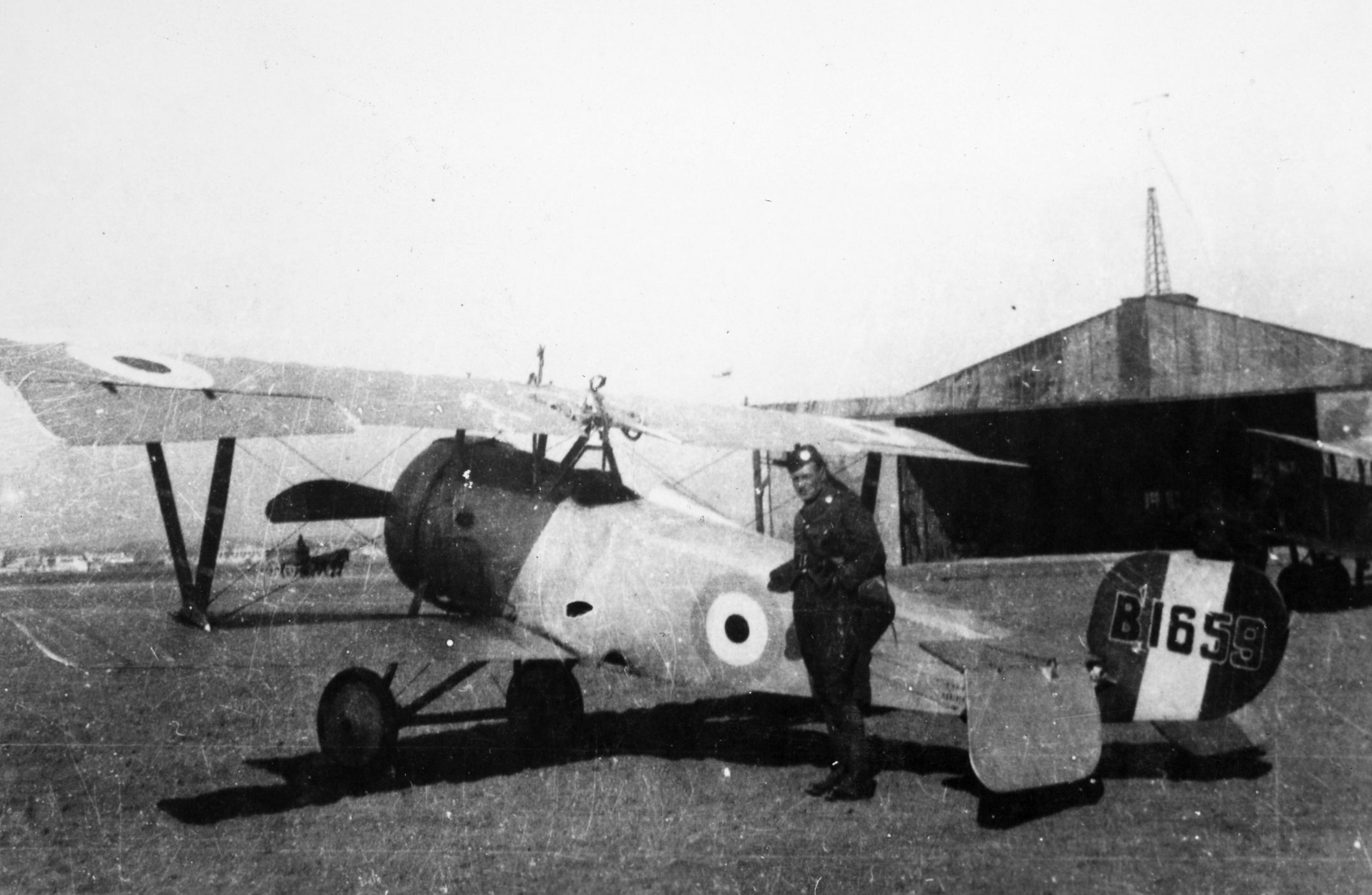
RFC Nieuport 23 in 1917

During March 1916, the new Nieuport 17 reached the front to begin replacing the earlier Nieuport 11 and 16 fighters that had been instrumental in ending the Fokker Scourge of 1915. On 2 May 1916, Escadrille N.57 became the first unit entirely equipped with the new model. During the late 1916 and into 1917, the Nieuport 17 equipped every fighter squadron of the Aéronautique Militaire. Almost all of the top French aces flew the nimble Nieuport during their flying careers, including Georges Guynemer, Charles Nungesser, Maurice Boyau, Armand Pinsard and René Dorme.

American volunteers of the Escadrille Lafayette, converted to the Nieuport 17 from Nieuport 11s and 16s, although only one achieved ace status, Raoul Lufberry.

The Nieuport 17 was ordered by the Royal Flying Corps and Royal Naval Air Service as it was markedly superior to British fighters. RFC squadrons that used Nieuport 17s and 23s as their main equipment included 1, 11, 29, 40 and 60 squadrons while 1, 3 and 4 Wings of the Royal Naval Air Service operated the 17 and the 17bis. Additional units in both services also had small numbers on strength.

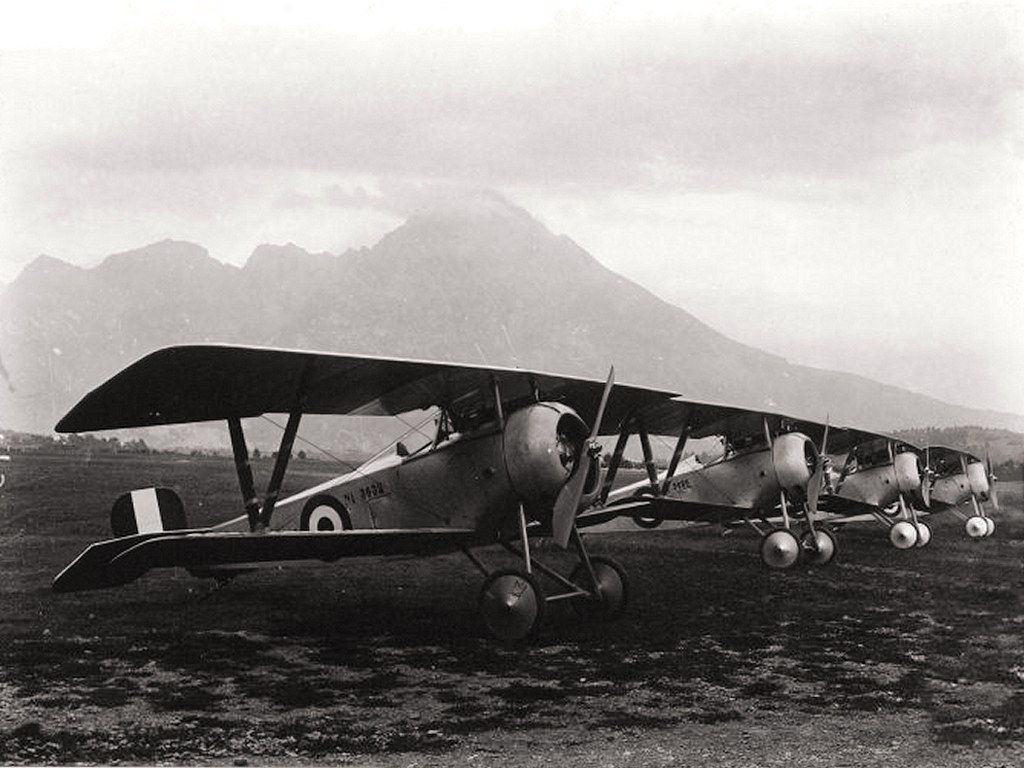
Lineup of Italian Nieuport-Macchi 17s

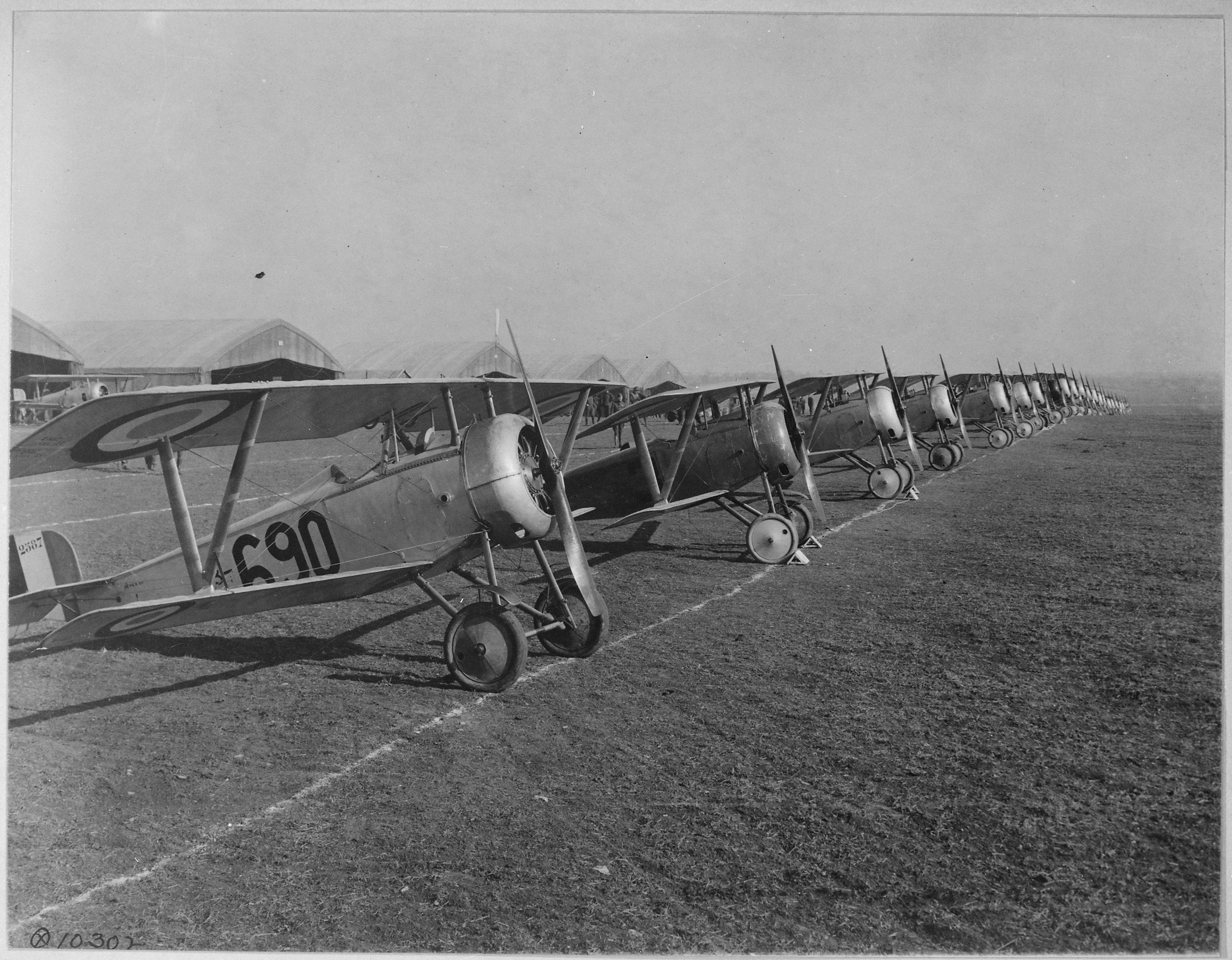
Nieuport 23 trainers at Issoudun Aerodrome, France

Many British Empire air aces flew Nieuport fighters, including the top Canadian ace Billy Bishop, V.C. and Albert Ball, V.C. who often hunted alone in his Nieuport. Mick Mannock V.C. flew Nieuports early in his career with 40 Squadron. His VC award reflected his combat career – including his time on Nieuports. The top-scoring Nieuport ace was Captain Phillip Fletcher Fullard of No. 1 Squadron RFC, who scored 40 kills between May and October 1917, before breaking his leg in a football match.

Italian aces, such as Francesco Baracca, Silvio Scaroni and Pier Piccio, achieved victories while flying Nieuport fighters. In Belgium, the 1st and 5th Belgian escadrilles were equipped with the Nieuport 17 and 23. Belgian aces flying the type included Andre de Meulemeester, Edmond Thieffry and Jan Olieslagers.

The Imperial Russian Air Service operated large numbers of Nieuports of all types, including the 17, 21 and 23. Being largely reliant on aircraft procured directly from France, there was pressure within Russia to establish the domestic manufacture of fighters and the type was produced under licence however inexperience and the limited availability of trained personnel to assist, and poor quality raw materials limited quality. Many of these were operated on the Eastern Front and during the Russian Civil Wars. Russian Nieuport aces include Alexander Kazakov, who flew the type against the Germans and later against the Bolsheviks.

By mid-1917, the Nieuport fighters were outclassed by new German types such as the Albatros D.III so that the 150 hp (110 kW) SPAD S.VII had begun to replace the Nieuport fighters in French front line squadrons. The British continued to operate Nieuports until early 1918, when enough Royal Aircraft Factory S.E.5s had become available to replace them.

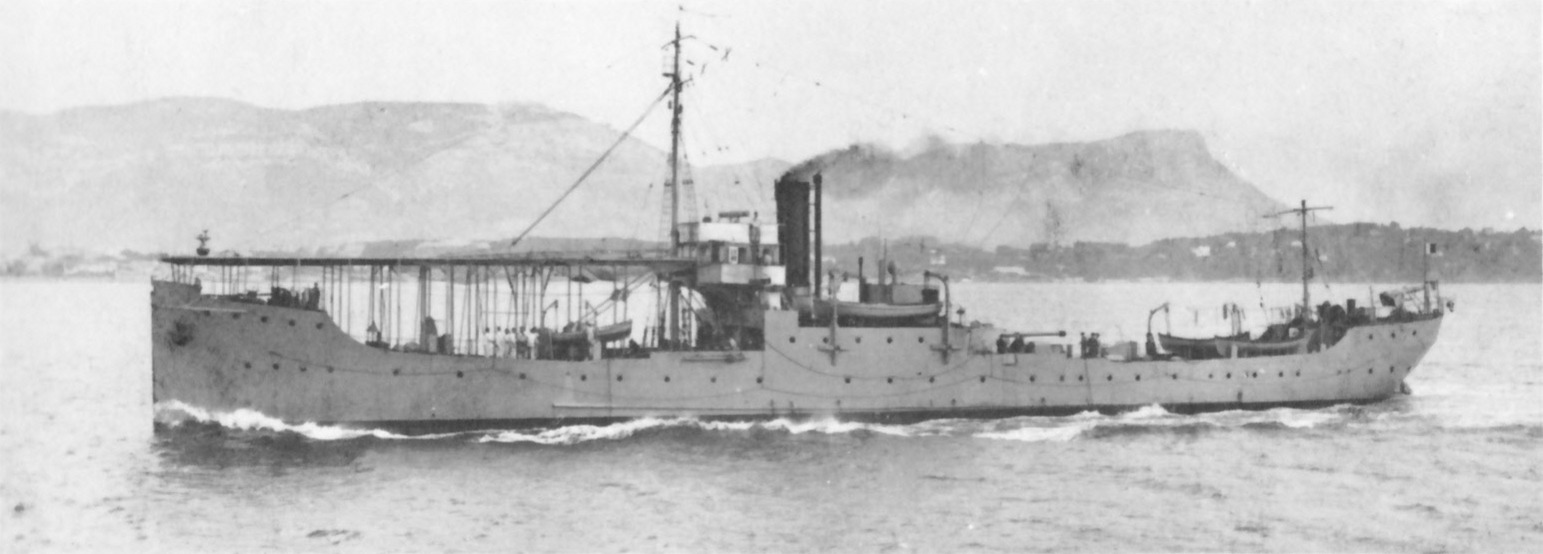
The French aviso Bapaume was fitted with a 20 m hangar deck and used for flying-off tests

Later in its service life, the 17 was operated in large numbers as an advanced trainer. The American Expeditionary Forces purchased 75 Nieuport 17s for training and the French operated a fleet of trainers. The French Aviation Maritime operated one Nieuport 21 for carrier training during 1920 and 1921 aboard Bapaume, a converted French Arras-class aviso, pending the delivery of carrier aircraft such as the Nieuport-Delage NiD.32RH.

Following its retirement from the European theatre, many examples were exported in small numbers for new Air Forces being formed around the world, to be used through the 1920s.

== Copies ==
So impressive were the Nieuport fighters in early 1916 that Idflieg (the German Inspectorate of flying troops) requested their aircraft manufacturers to produce a copy. Retrieved aircraft, detailed drawings and sketches were provided and the Siemens-Schuckert D.I was produced. The copy differed primarily in minor details, was deemed to be satisfactory and went into production, although the SSW D.I was obsolete by the time it went into service and was used mainly as an advanced trainer. Another clone of the Nieuport 17 was the Euler D.I, although development work did not proceed beyond a few prototypes.

Other manufacturers, notably Albatros and Pfalz, explored a sesquiplane configuration in their own fighter designs. The Albatros D.II led to the Albatros D.III and D.V - commonly called 'V-strutters' by the RFC to distinguish them from the earlier Albatros fighters. As well as the advantages of this layout these types also exacerbated the flutter problem, which was never satisfactorily contained, in spite of strengthening. The Pfalz D.III was also a sesquiplane version of a previous biplane fighter, although it featured a more substantial lower wing with two spars that avoided the flutter problems encountered by single-spar sesquiplanes.

== Variants ==
15 meter Nieuport
A colloquial description of the type based on nominal wing area.
Nieuport 17
The standard single-seat fighter biplane model.
Nieuport 17 Triplane
Testbed modified from Nieuport 17 for triplane with unusual wing stagger.
Nieuport 17bis
Re-engined variant, powered by a 130 hp (97 kW) Clerget 9B engine and fitted with fuselage stringers.
Nieuport 17bis Triplane
Testbed modified from Nieuport 17bis for triplane with unusual wing stagger.
Nieuport 21
A dedicated high altitude escort fighter/trainer variant equipped with an 80 hp (60 kW) Le Rhône rotary engine, horseshoe cowling and lacking a pilot's headrest.
Nieuport 23
Similar to the 17, featuring various structural changes that resulted in the Vickers machine gun being offset when installed. Only other visible difference was alterations to cabane rigging.
Nieuport 23bis
Similar to the 17bis, but powered by a Le Rhône and using 24 fuselage with 23 flying surfaces.
Siemens-Schuckert D.I
While differing in some details, the D.I was largely a copy of the Nieuport 17.
B.Kh.2 (Fighter type 2)
The Siamese designation for Nieuport 17, 21, 24, and 27.

== Surviving aircraft and replicas ==
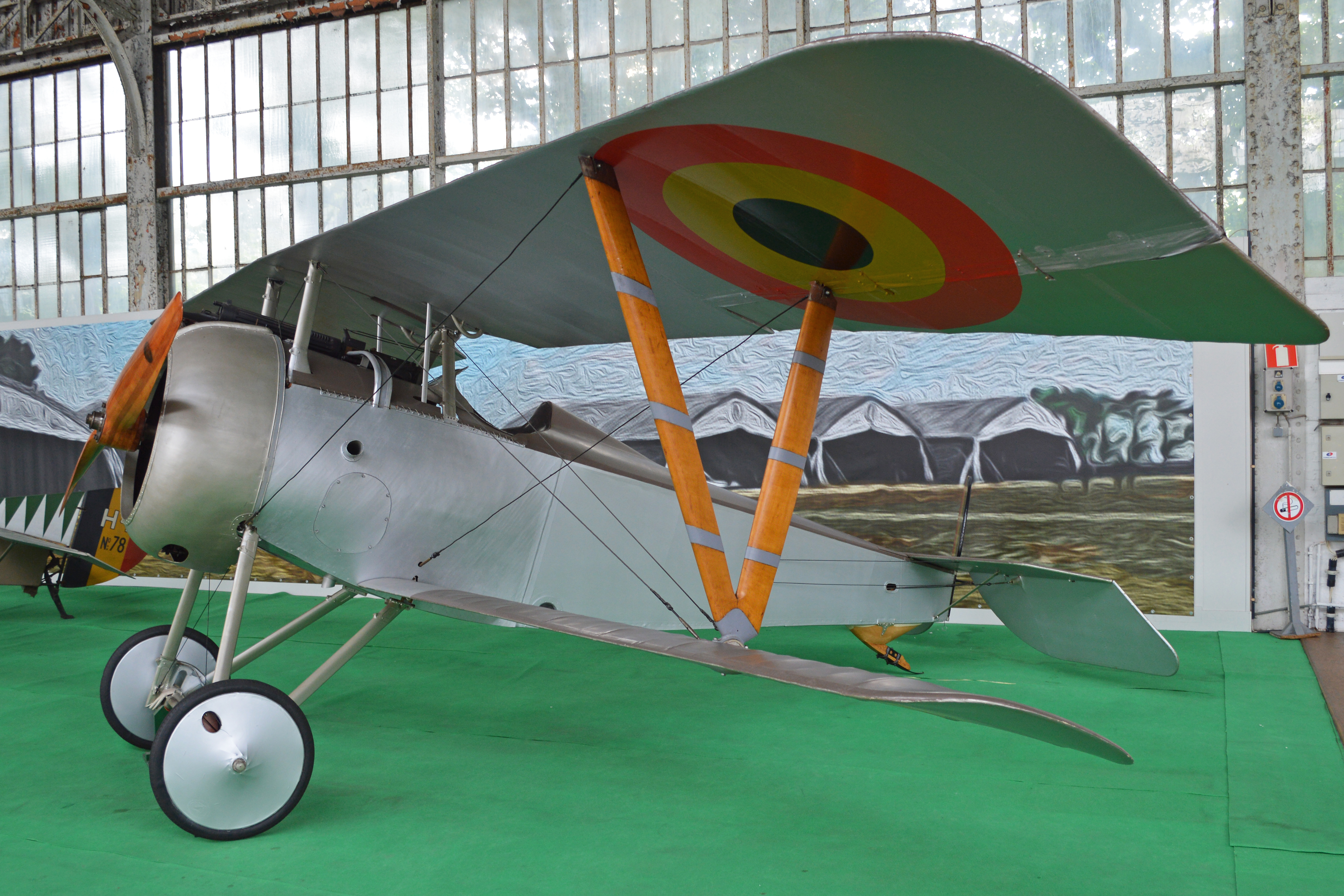
Nieuport 23 survivor in Belgian museum

A single original example has survived, this being Nieuport 23 "5024", which has been preserved and following a recent restoration, was placed on static display in the Belgian Royal Museum of the Armed Forces and Military History in Brussels. The Nieuport 17 has also become a popular aircraft for replica builders. Dedicated kits for the type have been produced, including both 7/8ths scale and full size, and groups of builders have reproduced entire squadrons of aircraft in this manner. Contemporary drawings, sourced from both the original factory and a German technical report on the fighter, have facilitated the construction of various replicas, such as the example on display in the Canadian War Museum in Ottawa, Ontario, which was built to the original specifications, while many others have used more modern construction, often using metal tubes to replace much of the wooden structure used on authentic aircraft.

== Operators ==
Belgium

- Aviation Militaire Belge – operated 12 Nieuport 17s and several Nieuport 23s

Brazil

- Aviação Militar – operated 20 Nieuport 21s

Chile

- Aviacion Militar Chilena – operated two Nieuport 17s.

Colombia

- Escuela Militar de Aviacion – operated 4 Nieuport 17s.

Czechoslovakia

- Letecký sbor (Aviation Corps) – operated at least one Nieuport 17 and several 23s after WW1.

Danish Air Force - operated around 20 aircraft from 1917 to 1923.

Estonia

- Lennuvae Rugement (Estonia Aviation Regiment) – operated 2 Nieuport 17s, 1 Nieuport 21 and 1 Nieuport 23

Finland

- Ilmailuvoimat (Finnish Aviation Forces) – operated a single Nieuport 17 and two Nieuport 23s.

France

- Aéronautique Militaire – Only units whose primary equipment were Nieuport 17, 21 or 23 are included as nearly every French Escadrille operated at least a few.
  - Escadrille N 23
  - Escadrille N 38
  - Escadrille N 62
  - Escadrille N 68
  - Escadrille N 69
  - Escadrille N 76
  - Escadrille N 77
  - Escadrille N 79
  - Escadrille N 87
  - Escadrille N 88
  - Escadrille N 90
  - Escadrille N 91
  - Escadrille N 92
  - Escadrille N 102
  - Escadrille N.153
  - Escadrille N 311
  - Escadrille N 312
  - Escadrille N 387
  - Escadrille N 392
  - Escadrille N 523
  - Escadrille N 581
  - Escadrille Lafayette
  - Group de Combat GC 11
    - Escadrille N 12
    - Escadrille N 31
    - Escadrille N 48
    - Escadrille N 57
    - Escadrille N 94
  - Group de Combat GC 12
    - Escadrille N 3
    - Escadrille N 26
    - Escadrille N 73
    - Escadrille N 103
  - Group de Combat GC 13
    - Escadrille N 15
    - Escadrille N 37
    - Escadrille N 65
    - Escadrille N 67
    - Escadrille N 84
    - Escadrille N 112
    - Escadrille N 124
  - Group de Combat GC 14
    - Escadrille N 75
    - Escadrille N 80
    - Escadrille N 83
    - Escadrille N 86
  - Group de Combat GC 15
    - Escadrille N 37
    - Escadrille N 78
    - Escadrille N 81
    - Escadrille N 85
    - Escadrille N 93
    - Escadrille N 97
    - Escadrille N 112
  - Group de Combat Chaux
  - Escadrille N 49
  - Escadrille N 81
  - Escadrille N 82
- Aéronautique Navale
  - Escadrille de chasse terrestre du CAM de Dunkerque - operated 7 Nieuport 17s

Guatemala

- Fuerza Aérea Guatemalteca - operated one Nieuport 21 from 1925 to 1926

Hungarian Soviet Republic

- Hungarian Red Air Arm – operated one captured aircraft.

Kingdom of Italy

- Corpo Aeronautico Militare – operated approximately 150 that were built under licence by Nieuport-Macchi
  - 83a Squadriglia 1st Sezione
  - 1st Gruppo (3rd Armata)
    - 77a Squadriglia
    - 80a Squadriglia
  - 2nd Gruppo (2nd Armata)
    - 76a Squadriglia
    - 81a Squadriglia
  - 7th Gruppo (1st and 6th Armata)
    - 79a Squadriglia
  - 9th Gruppo (1st Armata)
    - 71a Squadriglia
    - 75a Squadriglia
  - 10th Gruppo (Supreme Command)
    - 70a Squadriglia
    - 78a Squadriglia
    - 82a Squadriglia

Netherlands

- Luchtvaartafdeeling (Army Aviation Group) – operated 5 Nieuport 23s as 120 HP Nieuports and 5 Nieuport 21s as 80 HP Nieuports from 1917 to 1925

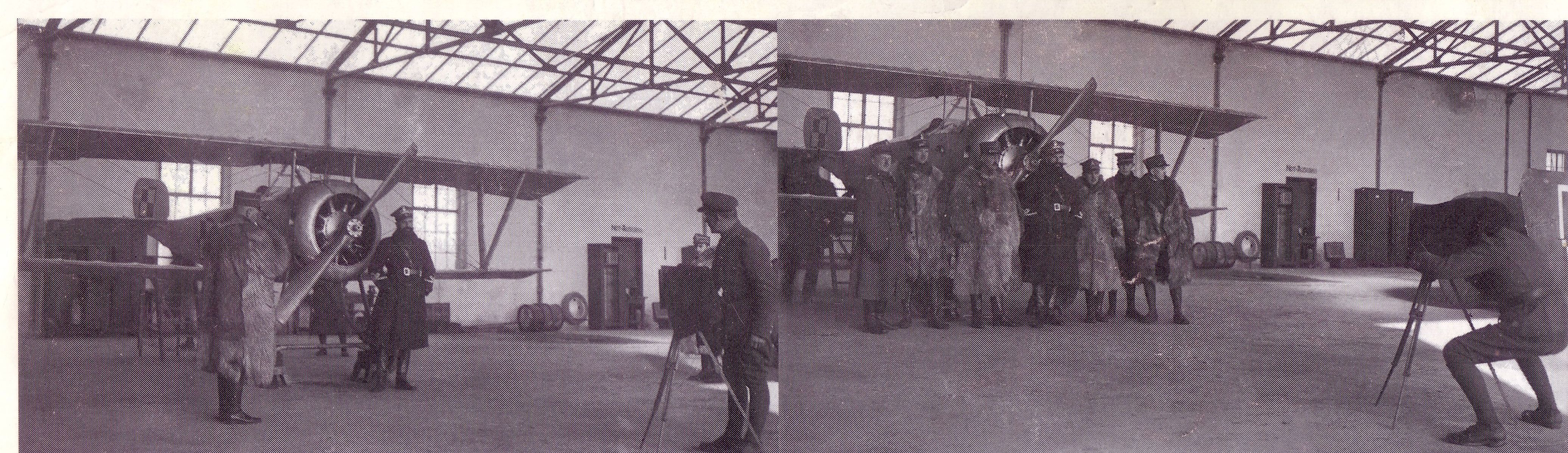
Polish Nieuport 23s

Poland
Siły Powietrzne (Air Forces) – operated at least five Nieuport 17s and three Nieuport 21s
Portugal
Serviço Aeronáutico Militar - operated 8 Nieuport Ni.21 E.1 trainers from 1919.
Romania

- Corpul Aerian Român – Purchased 30 Nieuport 17s from France. Another 10 were received from Russia in 1918.
  - Grupul 1 Aeronautic
  - Grupul 2 Aeronautic
  - Grupul 3 Aeronautic

Russian Empire

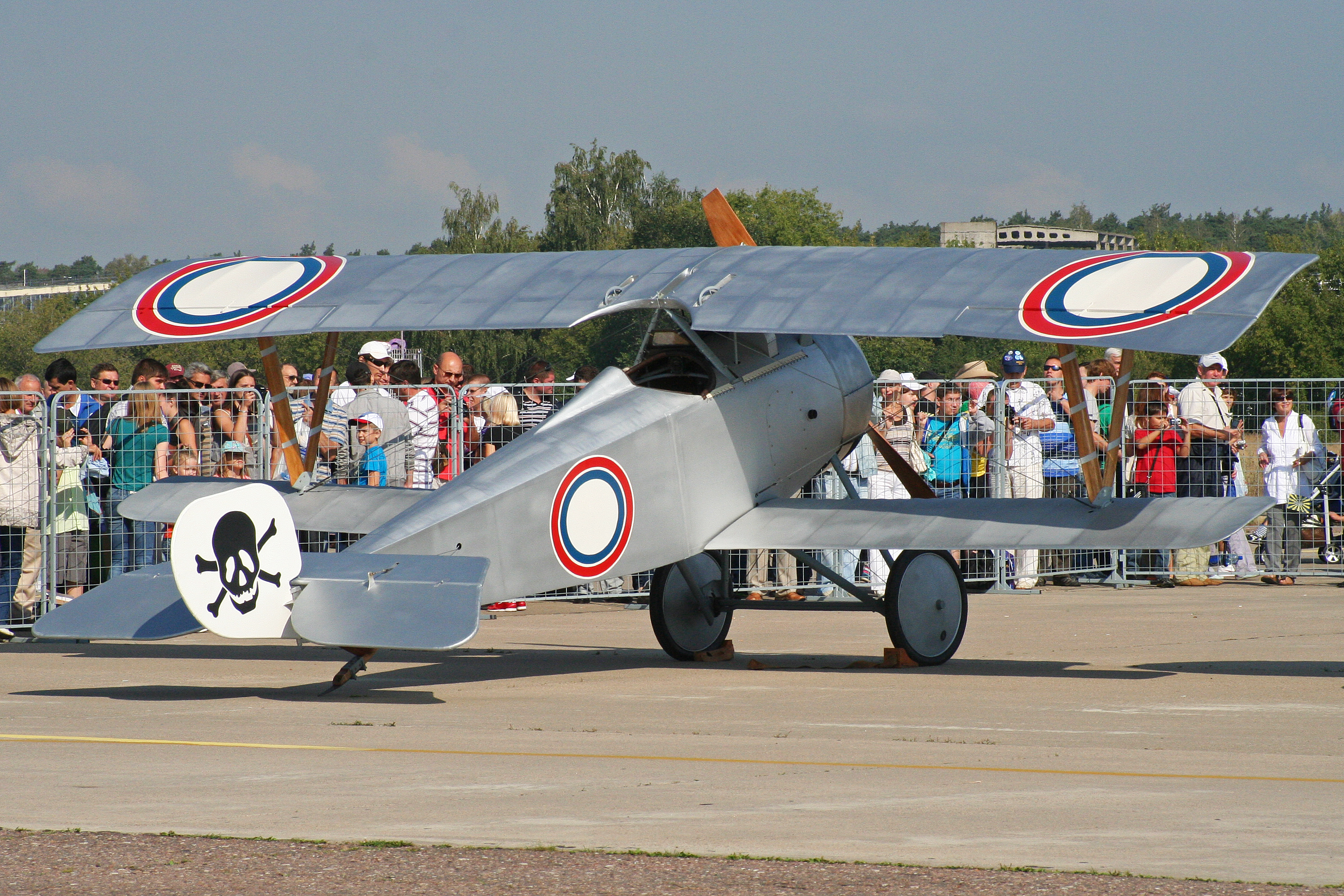
Replica Imperial Russian Air Service Nieuport 17

- Императорскій военно-воздушный флотъ (Imperial Russian Air Service) – made substantial purchases of Nieuport 17s and 21s from France, with additional aircraft built under licence by Dux
  - 1st Fighter detachment
  - 2nd Fighter detachment
  - 3rd Fighter detachment
  - 4th Fighter detachment
  - 5th Fighter detachment
  - 6th Fighter detachment
  - 7th Fighter detachment
  - 8th Fighter detachment
  - 9th Fighter detachment
  - 10th Fighter detachment
  - 11th Fighter detachment
  - 12th Fighter detachment
  - 19th Corps Fighter detachment

Russia White movement

- White Army – operated an unknown number of ex-Tsarist Nieuport 17s

Switzerland

- Schweizerische Fliegertruppe (Swiss Air Troop) – operated five Nieuport 23s.

(Thailand) Siam

- Royal Siamese Aeronautical Service – operated at least one Nieuport 17.

Soviet Union

- Glavvozduhflot – operated a large number of ex-Imperial Russian Air Service Nieuports
  - 1st Red Air Force Fighter Squadron
  - 2nd Aviaotryady
  - 3rd Aviaotryady
  - 4th Aviaotryady
  - 8th Aviaotryady
  - 9th Aviaotryady
  - 10th Aviaotryady
  - 12th Aviaotryady
  - 14th Aviaotryady
  - 1st Naval Istrootryady
  - 2nd Naval Istrootryady
  - Eskadra No 2
  - and flying schools.

Turkey

- Kuva-yı Havaiye Müfettiş-i Umumiliği (General Inspectorate of Air Forces) - operated two captured Nieuport 17s serialed K1 and K2 in late 1918.

West Ukrainian People's Republic

- West Ukrainian People's Republic aviation corps – operated at least three Nieuport 17s, two Nieuport 21s, and seven Nieuport 23s.

Ukrainian People's Republic

- Ukrainian People's Republic Air Fleet

United Kingdom

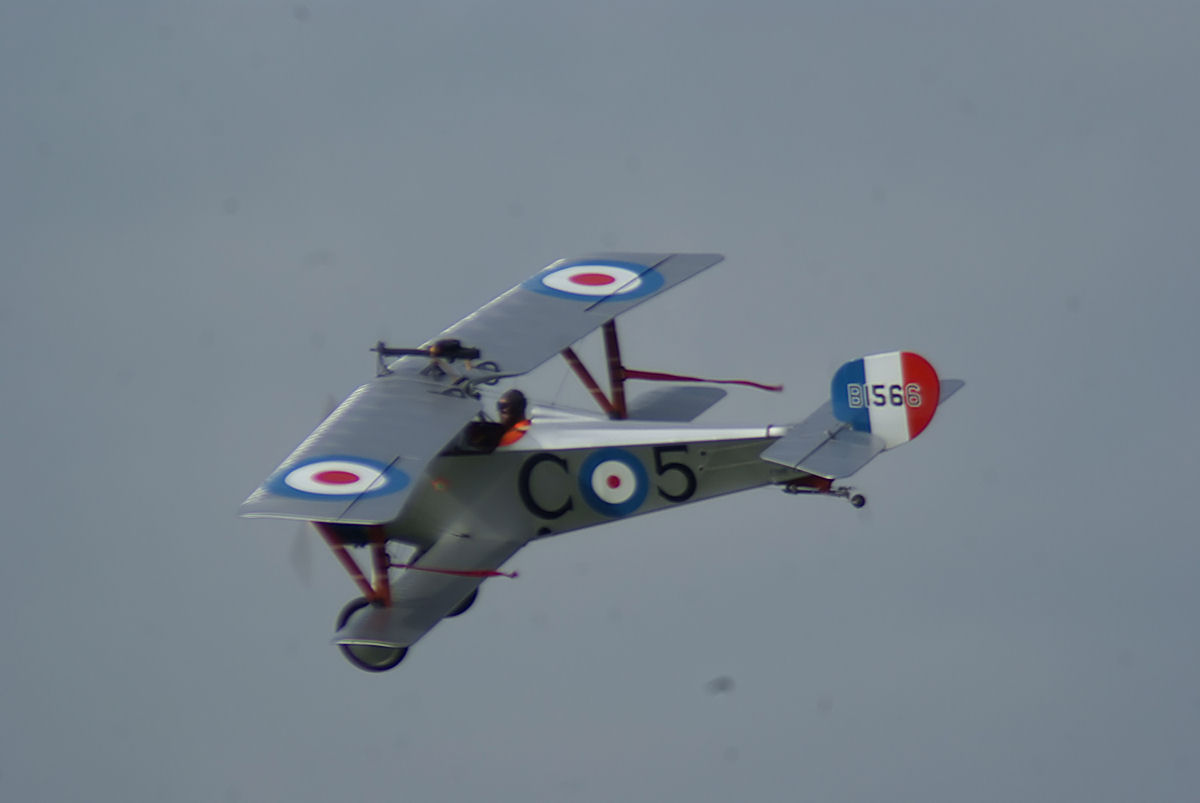
Replica of Billy Bishop's Nieuport 23.

- Royal Flying Corps – Operated 50 Nieuport 17bis built under licence by Nieuport & General Aircraft, Nieuport 17s, and 80 French built Nieuport 23s
  - No. 1 Squadron RFC
  - No. 6 Squadron RFC
  - No. 11 Squadron RFC
  - No. 14 Squadron RFC
  - No. 29 Squadron RFC
  - No. 40 Squadron RFC
  - No. 60 Squadron RFC
  - No. 111 Squadron RFC
  - No. 113 Squadron RFC
- Royal Naval Air Service – operated Nieuport 17, Nieuport 17bis and five Nieuport 21s
  - No. 1 Wing
  - No. 3 Wing
  - No. 4 Wing
  - No. 6 (Naval) Squadron
  - No. 8 (Naval) Squadron
  - No. 11 (Naval) Squadron

United States

- American Expeditionary Force – purchased 175 Nieuport 17s, one Nieuport 17bis, 197 Nieuport 21s and 50 Nieuport 23s for training purposes.
  - 31st Aero Squadron

== Specifications (Nieuport 17 C.1) ==
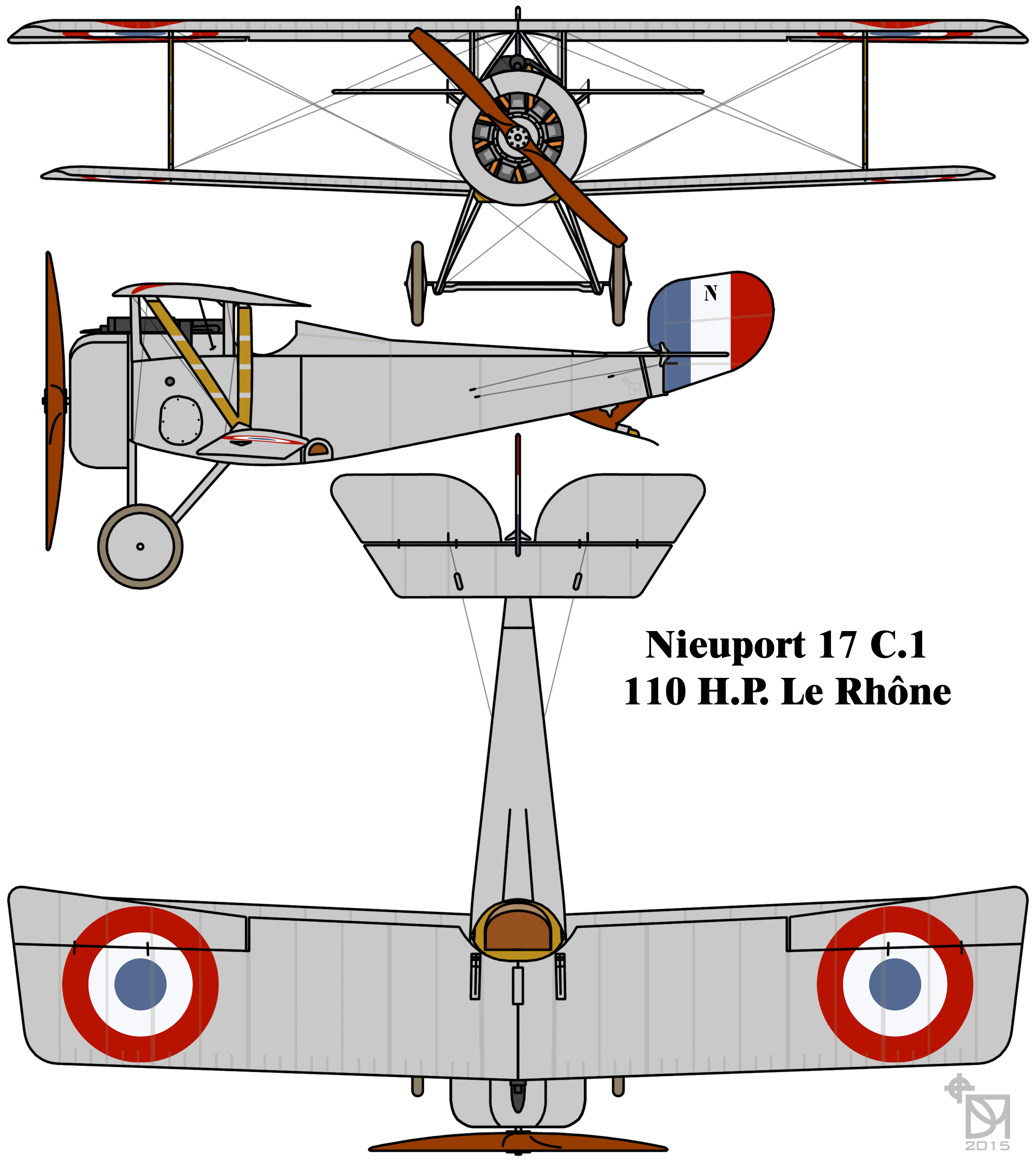
Nieuport 17 C.1 drawing

Data from Those Classic Nieuports, The Nieuport 17

General characteristics

- Crew: one
- Length: 5.80 m (19 ft 0 in) (Without optional cône de penetration)
- Wingspan: 8.16 m (26 ft 9 in)
- Height: 2.40 m (7 ft 10 in) (Without overwing gun and mounting)
- Wing area: 14.75 m^{2} (158.8 sq ft)
- Airfoil: Type N
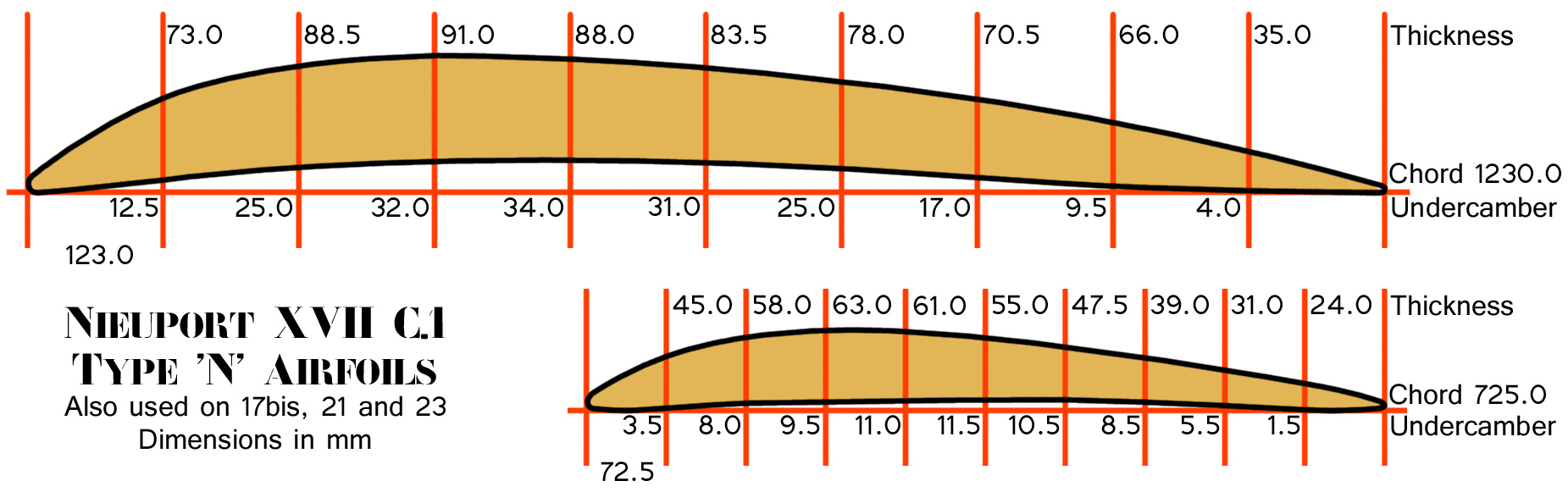
  Nieuport 17 Type N airfoil drawings
- Empty weight: 375 kg (827 lb)
- Gross weight: 560 kg (1,235 lb)
- Powerplant: 1 × Le Rhône 9Ja 9-cylinder rotary engine, 82 kW (110 hp) (nominal rated power, not measured power)
- Propellers: 2-bladed fixed pitch wood Eclair 4 or Levasseur 484 propellers, 2.4 m (7 ft 10 in) diameter

Performance

- Maximum speed: 170 km/h (110 mph, 92 kn)
- Endurance: 1.75 hours
- Service ceiling: 5,300 m (17,400 ft)
- Time to altitude:
  - 5 minutes 30 seconds to 2,000 m (6,500 ft)
  - 9 minutes to 3,000 m (10,000 ft)
- Wing loading: 37.9 kg/m^{2} (7.8 lb/sq ft)
- Power/mass: 0.15 kW/kg (0.091 hp/lb)

Armament

- Guns:
  - (French service) 1 × synchronised 7.7 mm (.303 in) Vickers machine gun and/or 1 × 7.7 mm (.303 in) Lewis gun on upper wing mounting
  - (British service) 1 × Lewis gun on Foster mounting on upper wing
- Rockets: 8 × Le Prieur rockets (rarely fitted)

Avionics

- 26 cm (10 in) camera (some aircraft only)

== See also ==
- 1916 in aviation

Related development

- Nieuport 11
- Nieuport 17bis
- Nieuport 24
- Redfern Nieuport 17/24, replica for amateur construction
- Siemens-Schuckert D.I, a German copy

Aircraft of comparable role, configuration, and era

- Airco DH.5
- Fokker D.III
- Sopwith Pup
- Vickers F.B.19

Related lists

- List of fighter aircraft
- List of military aircraft of France
- List of World War I Entente aircraft
- List of aircraft of the Royal Flying Corps
- List of aircraft of the Royal Naval Air Service
