= Sands Fokker Dr.1 Triplane =

American homebuilt aircraft

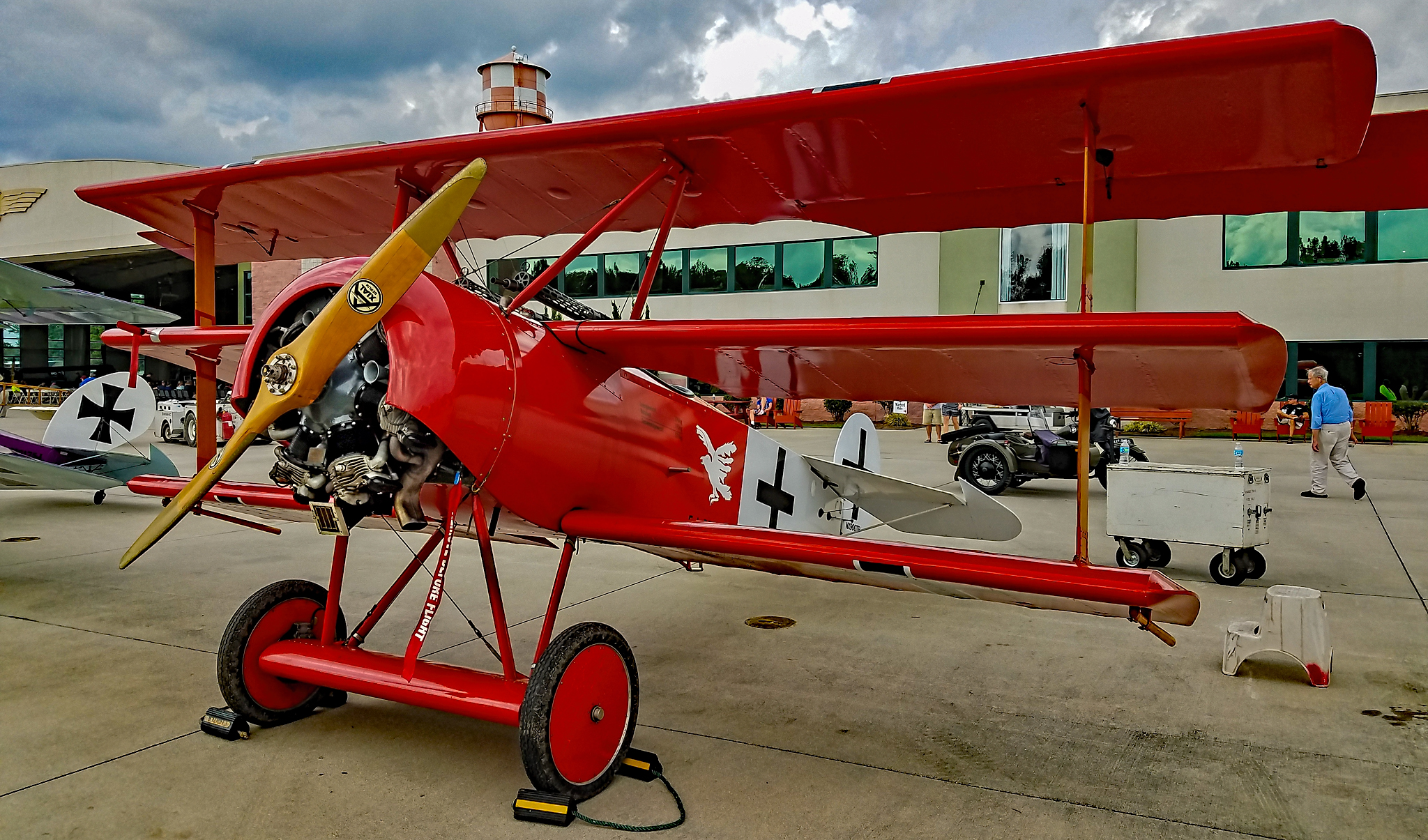

General information
- Type: Homebuilt aircraft
- National origin: United States
- Manufacturer: Wicks Aircraft and Motorsports
- Designer: Ron Sands Sr
- Status: Plans available (2014)

History
- Developed from: Fokker Dr.1

The Sands Fokker Dr.1 Triplane is an American homebuilt aircraft that was designed by Ron Sands Sr of Mertztown, Pennsylvania, and produced by Wicks Aircraft and Motorsports. It is a full-sized replica fighter aircraft based upon the 1917-vintage Fokker Dr.1. The aircraft is supplied as a kit and in the form of plans for amateur construction.

== Design and development ==
The aircraft features a strut-braced triplane layout, a single-seat open cockpit, fixed conventional landing gear, and a single engine in tractor configuration.

The Sands Fokker Dr.1 Triplane is made from welded steel tubing and wood, with its flying surfaces covered in doped aircraft fabric. The cockpit width is 28 in (71 cm). The acceptable power range is 110 to 185 hp (82 to 138 kW) and the standard engines used are the 160 hp (119 kW) Lycoming O-320, the 185 hp (138 kW) Lycoming O-360, the 110 hp (82 kW) Le Rhône 9J rotary engine or the 125 hp (93 kW) Warner Scarab radial engine powerplant.

The aircraft has a typical empty weight of 1,150 lb (520 kg) and a gross weight of 1,600 lb (730 kg), giving a useful load of 450 lb (200 kg). With full fuel of 23 U.S. gallons (87 L; 19 imp gal) the payload for the pilot and baggage is 312 lb (142 kg).

The standard day, sea level, no wind, take off with a 185 hp (138 kW) engine is 300 ft (91 m) and the landing roll is 200 ft (61 m).

The designer estimated the construction time from the supplied kit as 3,000 hours.

== Operational history ==
By 1998 the company reported that 100 sets of plans had been sold and 15 aircraft were completed and flying.

== Specifications (Sands Fokker Dr.1 Triplane) ==
Data from AeroCrafter

General characteristics

- Crew: one
- Length: 19.20 ft (5.85 m)
- Wingspan: 23 ft 6 in (7.16 m)
- Empty weight: 1,150 lb (522 kg)
- Gross weight: 1,600 lb (726 kg)
- Fuel capacity: 23 U.S. gallons (87 L; 19 imp gal)
- Powerplant: 1 × Lycoming O-360 four cylinder, air-cooled, four stroke aircraft engine, 185 hp (138 kW)
- Propellers: 2-bladed wooden fixed pitch

Performance

- Maximum speed: 120 mph (190 km/h, 100 kn)
- Cruise speed: 110 mph (180 km/h, 96 kn)
- Stall speed: 42 mph (68 km/h, 36 kn)
- Range: 250 mi (400 km, 220 nmi)
- Service ceiling: 15,000 ft (4,600 m)
- Rate of climb: 1,800 ft/min (9.1 m/s)

Armament

- Guns: Twin replica Spandau machine guns
