= Nieuport 17bis =

French WW1 sesquiplane fighter aircraft used by the RNAS

Nieuport 17bis and 23bis
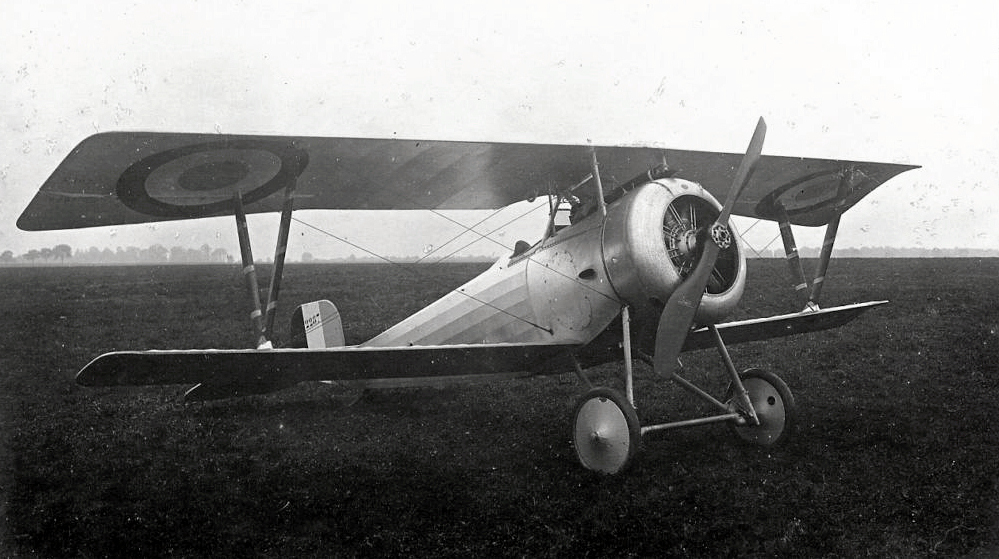

General information
- Type: Fighter
- National origin: France
- Manufacturer: Nieuport
- Designer: Gustave Delage
- Built by: Nieuport & General Aircraft
- Status: Retired
- Primary users: Royal Naval Air Service Royal Flying Corps; Aéronautique Militaire
- Number built: 84+ 17bis and 17 23bis

History
- Introduction date: 1 February 1917
- Developed from: Nieuport 17
- Developed into: Nieuport 24

The Nieuport 17bis C.1 (or Nieuport XVIIbis C.1 in contemporary sources) was a World War I French single-seat sesquiplane fighter that was produced under licence in the United Kingdom in small numbers for the Royal Naval Air Service.

== Development ==
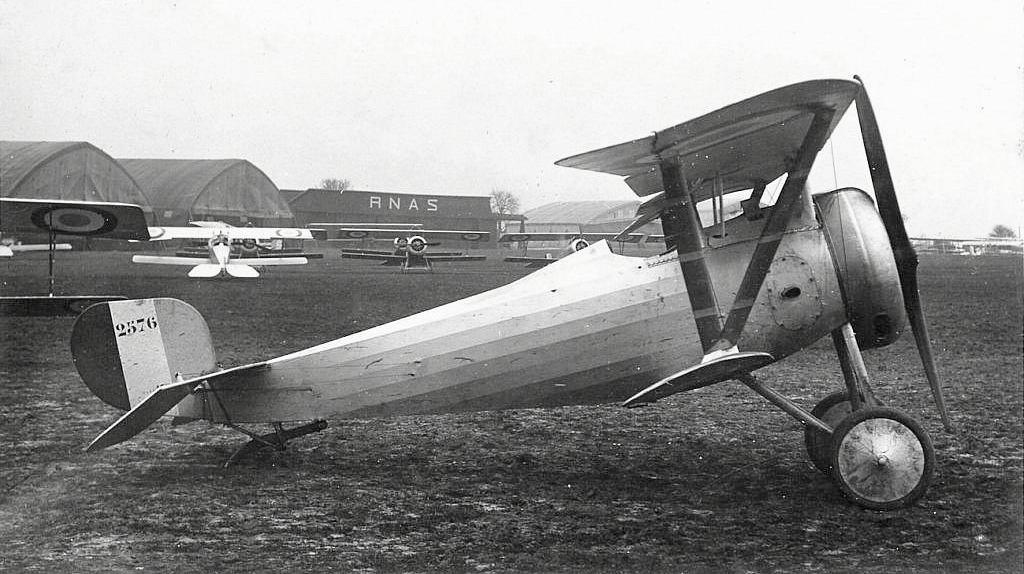
Nieuport 17bis prototype in French markings. The forward rake of the front cabane struts is evident

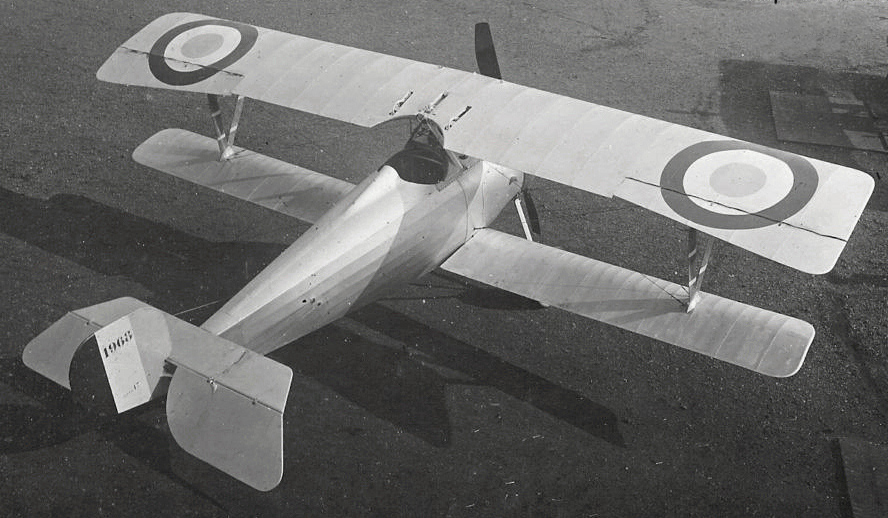
Nieuport 17bis from above showing off the square ailerons.

The Nieuport 17bis designation was initially used by Nieuport for a Nieuport 11 variant that had been retrofitted with the wings and side fairings from a Nieuport 17, however this type was not produced in any numbers and the designation was reused.

The Nieuport 17bis was the first of the vee strut scouts to feature a fully streamlined fuselage, with longitudinal stringers to fair out the shape. Other than the changes to the fuselage, minimal alterations were made, and unlike the later 24, 24bis and 27, the flying surfaces remained the same as used on the 17, as was much of the internal structure. Unlike the 17, or any of the other Vee strutters, it had the Vickers Machine Gun offset to the port (left) side of the centerline. Due to shortages of Le Rhône rotaries, they were fitted with the 130 hp (97 kW) Clerget 9B rotary instead of the 25 kg (55 lb) lighter 120 hp (89 kW) Le Rhône 9J used in most of the other Nieuport single seat scouts. A few examples were fitted with the lower powered 110 hp (82 kW) Clerget 9Z. As a result of the Clerget's slightly greater diameter, the cowling was ballooned out slightly to provide clearance.

The majority of Nieuport 17bis were operated by 6 (Naval) Squadron, who tested them against a Sopwith Triplane and a Sopwith Camel. It was found to have similar manoeuvrability to the Triplane and have a higher dive speed, but was slightly slower at altitude and had heavier controls. Climb rates varied, and in the first test the 17bis outclimbed the Triplane by a significant margin, however in the second test the times to altitude were identical between the two types. The Camel was marginally faster at sea level but had a lower rate of climb while the speed advantage gradually disappeared with altitude. Adding a Lewis machine gun to the Vickers reduced the climb rate, and increased the time it took to climb to 12,000 ft (3,700 m) by 2 minutes. Initial reports were impressive, but the Clerget engines lost power quickly between overhauls, and the problem was worse with the British built engines. Many pilots tried to have French-built engines in their aircraft. Some aircraft were also delivered to units with incorrect propellers, which also hampered performance.

=== Triplane ===
At least one 17bis was built as a triplane in the same manner as the Nieuport 17 triplanes, with the wings staggered with the middle wing furthest forward, and the lowest wing furthest aft. Flight testing discovered that it was longitudinally unstable but handled well otherwise, but the concept was not pursued further.

=== Nieuport 23bis ===
The Nieuport 23bis was a later but in many ways a similar development to the 17bis and was the result of the RFC's desperation to get as many aircraft as possible into front line service, but only 17 were produced and all went to the RFC. It combined the flying surfaces including the tail of the 23 with the fuselage of the 24bis, and was fitted with other Nieuport 23 parts, such as an earlier form of cowling. Unlike the 17bis, it retained the Le Rhône normally used by Nieuport scouts.

=== Distinguishing features ===
The 17, 17bis, 23 and 23bis flying surfaces had the front spar positioned further forward than on the later types. Aside from the lack of a plywood leading edge to the wing, the key identifying feature was the rake of the forward cabane struts connecting the top wing to the fuselage. On the 17, 17bis, 21, 23 and 23bis, the cabane struts were angled forward from the fuselage, while on the 24, 24bis, 25 and 27, they were angled aft. Both the 17bis and the 23bis used the square ailerons, rather than the rounded ailerons used on production versions of the later types.

== Operational history ==
Aside from one example being flown by Charles Nungesser and marked with his personal serial number N1895, the Nieuport 17bis saw little service with the French Aéronautique Militaire.

The Royal Naval Air Service (RNAS) was the primary operator of the Nieuport 17bis, with 6 (Naval) Squadron being the only unit wholly equipped with the type. It primarily replaced the obsolete Nieuport 10 and the Nieuport 11 and would in turn be replaced by the Sopwith Camel. The RNAS received 82 examples, of which 32 were from Nieuport (including 1 triplane) and 50 from Nieuport & General Aircraft who built them under licence in the UK. The British-built examples were delivered so slowly that the type had been declared obsolete before most were even delivered and only 4 were known to have been used operationally. As a consequence, most were never removed from their crates, and were scrapped without having been flown. The initial order of 50 had been reduced from 100, and an additional order of 100 from Nieuport & General was cancelled outright. After having been withdrawn from front line duties beginning in June 1917, some were used for training in the UK, where they were flown unarmed. Those that were built in France were silver doped, while those built in the UK were camouflaged.

The Royal Flying Corps never operated the 17bis, however it did receive 17 of the similar Nieuport 23bis that had been misidentified until recently.

== Variants ==
- Nieuport 17bis - 130 hp (97 kW) Clerget 9B rotary
  - Experimental variant with oversized spinner.
  - Nieuport 17bis Triplane - 130 hp (97 kW) Clerget 9B rotary
- Nieuport 23bis - 120 hp (89 kW) Le Rhône 9J rotary

== Operators ==
United Kingdom

- Royal Naval Air Service (RNAS) - Nieuport 17bis only.
  - 6 (Naval) Squadron
  - 9 (Naval) Squadron 2 examples used while the unit was forming in Feb 1917.
  - 11 (Naval) Squadron used several examples while acting as a pilot pool and operational training unit for 6 Squadron.
- Royal Flying Corps (RFC) - Nieuport 23bis only.
  - No. 14 Squadron RFC
  - No. 29 Squadron RFC
  - No. 111 Squadron RFC
  - No. 113 Squadron RFC

France

- Aéronautique Militaire - operated a small number of the 17bis, mainly for trials and test purposes.

== Specifications (Nieuport 17bis) ==
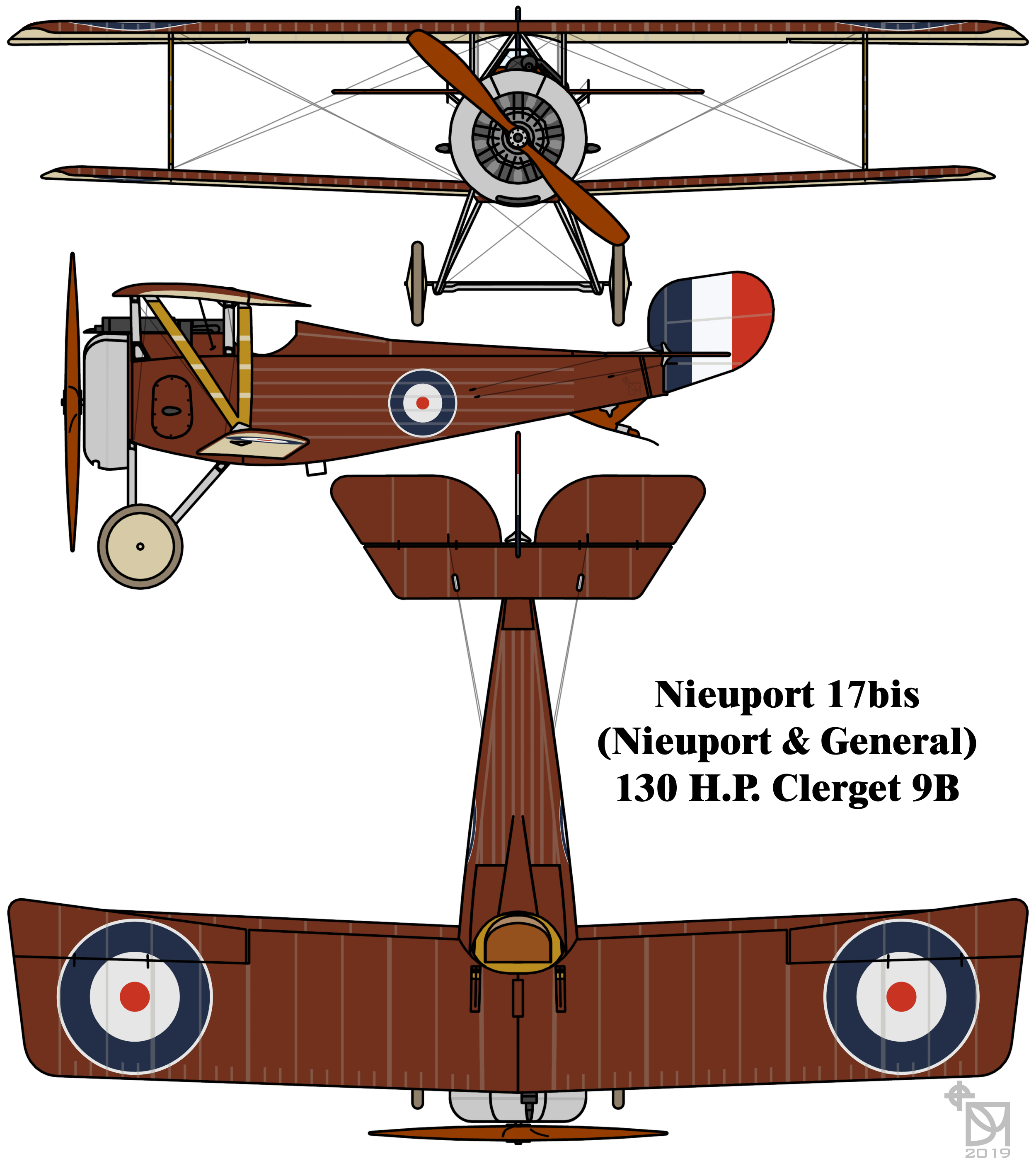
3-view drawing of British-built Nieuport 17bis

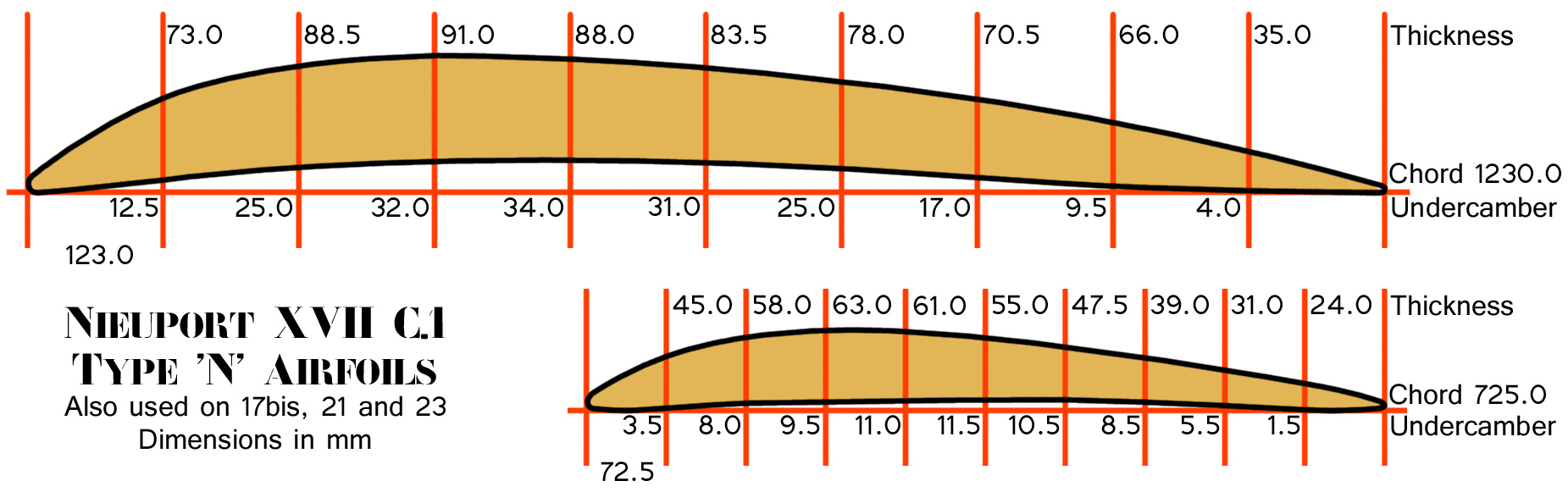
Nieuport Type N airfoil drawings

Data from Tanner, 1976, p.179 (dimensions only), Davilla, 1997, p.385

General characteristics

- Crew: 1
- Length: 5.703 m (18 ft 9 in) from drawings
- Upper wingspan: 8.160 m (26 ft 9 in)
- Upper wing chord: 1.233 m (4 ft 0.5 in)
- Upper wing sweep: 2° 20' (Note: per British rigging instructions, French aircraft were rigged with 3° 20' of wing sweep.)
- Lower wingspan: 7.800 m (25 ft 7 in)
- Lower wing chord:.720 m (2 ft 4.3 in)
- Height: 2.400 m (7 ft 10 in)
- Wing area: 14.75 m^{2} (158.8 sq ft)
- Airfoil: Type "N"
- Gross weight: 600 kg (1,323 lb)
- Undercarriage track: 1.600 m (5 ft 3.0 in)
- Powerplant: 1 × Clerget 9B air-cooled rotary engine, 97 kW (130 hp)
- Propellers: 2-bladed Levasseur 802 or (on British-built examples) a British & Colonial Company P23 wooden fixed pitch propeller

Performance

- Maximum speed: 175 km/h (109 mph, 94 kn) at sea level
  - 172 km/h (107 mph; 93 kn) at 3,000 m (9,800 ft)
- Service ceiling: 7,000 m (23,000 ft)
- Time to altitude:
  - 45 seconds to 300 m (1,000 ft)
  - 3 minutes to 1,200 m (4,000 ft)
  - 8 minutes to 3,000 m (10,000 ft)
  - 15 minutes to 4,600 m (15,000 ft)
  - 50 minutes to 6,100 m (20,000 ft)

Armament

- 1 x synchronized 7.7 mm (.303 in) Vickers Machine Gun mounted on the forward fuselage and optionally 1 x 7.7 mm (.303 in) Lewis Gun on an overwing mount.

== See also ==
Related development

- Nieuport 17
- Nieuport 24

Related lists

- List of fighter aircraft
- List of military aircraft of France
- List of aircraft of the Royal Air Force
- List of aircraft of the Royal Naval Air Service
- List of aircraft of the Royal Flying Corps
- List of military aircraft of the Entente Powers in World War I
