= Clerget 9B =

World War I–era rotary aircraft engine

9B
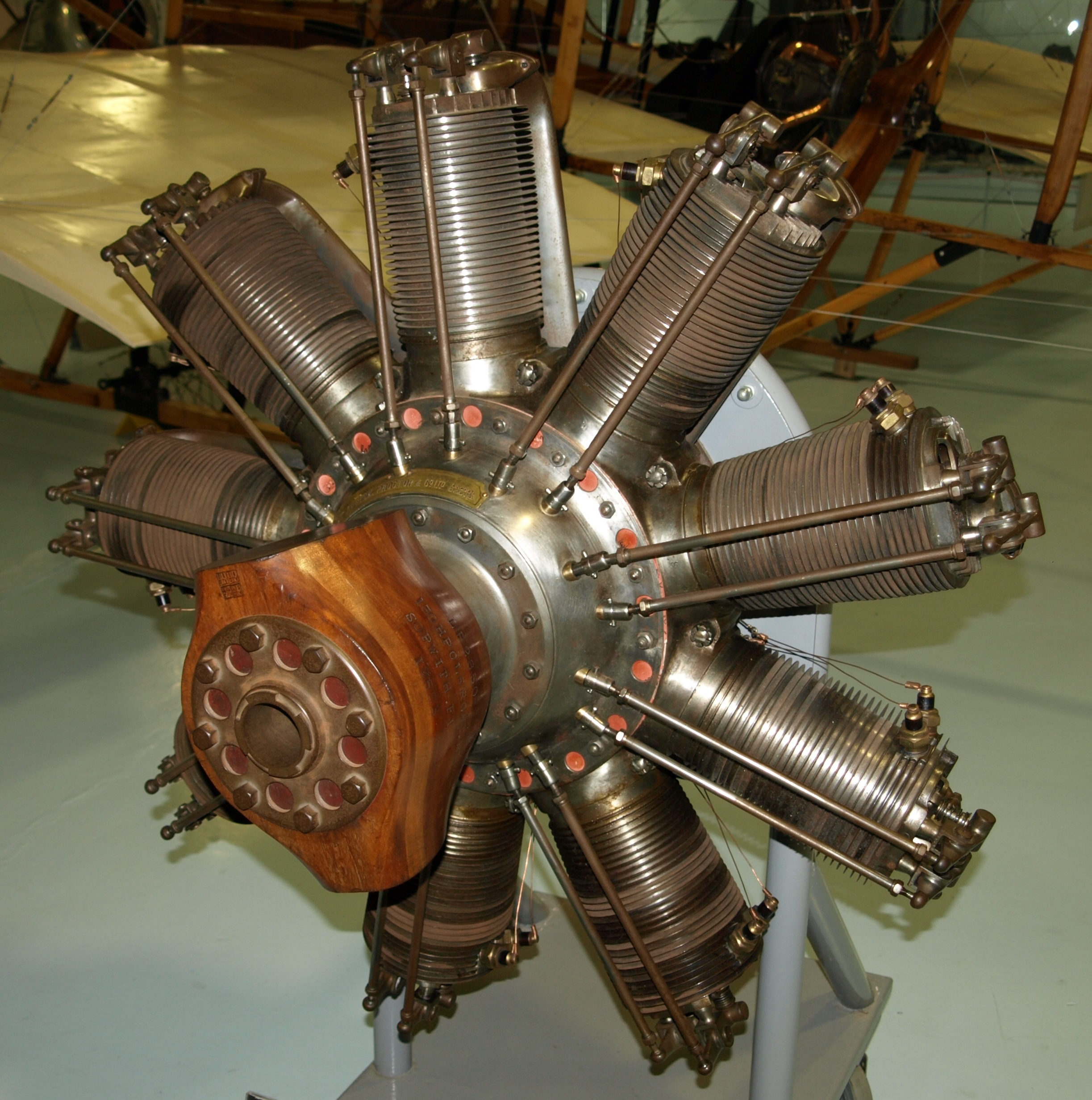
- Preserved Clerget 9B engine on display at the Fleet Air Arm Museum, RNAS Yeovilton.
- Type: Rotary engine
- National origin: France
- Manufacturer: Clerget-Blin
- First run: 1913
- Major applications: Sopwith Camel
- Number built: 6,500 (French production); 3,650 (British production)
- Developed into: Bentley BR1

The Clerget 9B is a nine-cylinder rotary aircraft engine of the World War I era designed by Pierre Clerget. Manufactured in both France and Great Britain (Gwynnes Limited), it was used on such aircraft as the Sopwith Camel. The Clerget 9Bf was an increased stroke version.

== Variants ==
Clerget 9B

(1913) 130 hp (97 kW). 1,300 produced by Ruston Proctor & Co Ltd of Lincoln

Clerget 9Bf

(1915) 140 hp (104 kW). Extended stroke 172 mm (6.75 in) version, increasing capacity to 17.5 L (1,066.5 cu in). 1,750 produced by Gwynnes Limited and 600 produced by Ruston Proctor.

== Applications ==
=== Clerget 9B ===
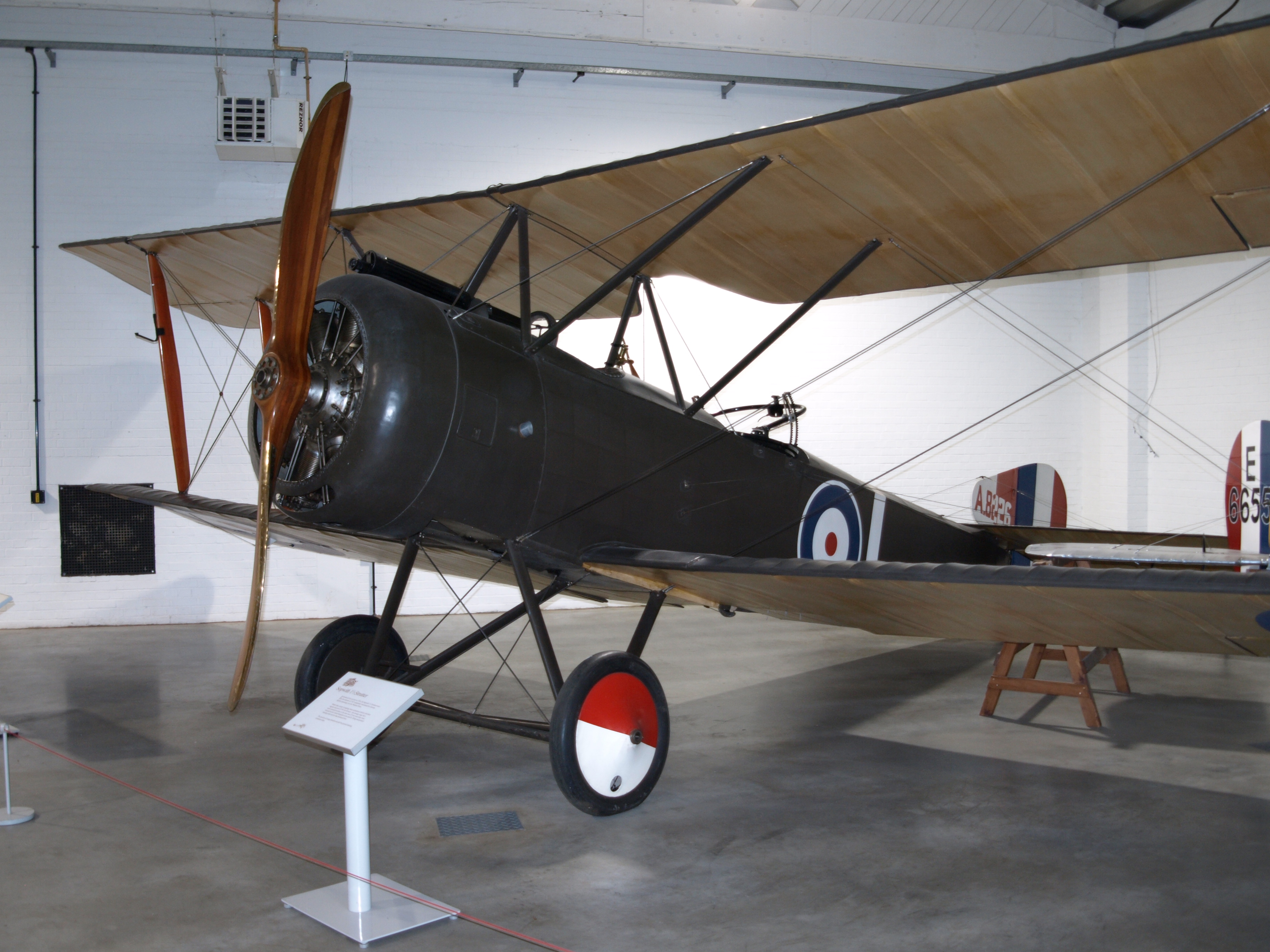
Clerget 9B powered Sopwith 1½ Strutter on display at the Royal Air Force Museum London

- Armstrong Whitworth F.K.10
- Avro 504
- Avro 531
- Bristol M.1
- Cierva C.6
- Cierva C.8
- Fairey Hamble Baby
- FBA Type C
- Nieuport 12
- Nieuport 17bis
- Sopwith Baby
- Sopwith Camel
- Sopwith Scooter
- Sopwith Triplane
- Sopwith 1½ Strutter

=== Clerget 9Bf ===
- Sopwith Camel

== Engines on display ==
- A preserved Clerget 9B engine is on public display at the Fleet Air Arm Museum, RNAS Yeovilton.
- A Clerget 9Bf engine is on display at the Powerhouse Museum, Sydney.
- A Clerget 9B is on display at the Pima Air & Space Museum in Arizona.

== Operational (Airworthy) Rotary Engines ==
The Shuttleworth Collection based at Old Warden Aerodrome, UK, operate an airworthy late production Sopwith Triplane (G-BOCK) fitted with an original 9B as well as an airworthy late production Sopwith Camel (G-BZSC) fitted with an original long-stroke 9Bf. These aircraft can be seen displaying at home air displays through the summer months.

== Specifications (Clerget 9B) ==
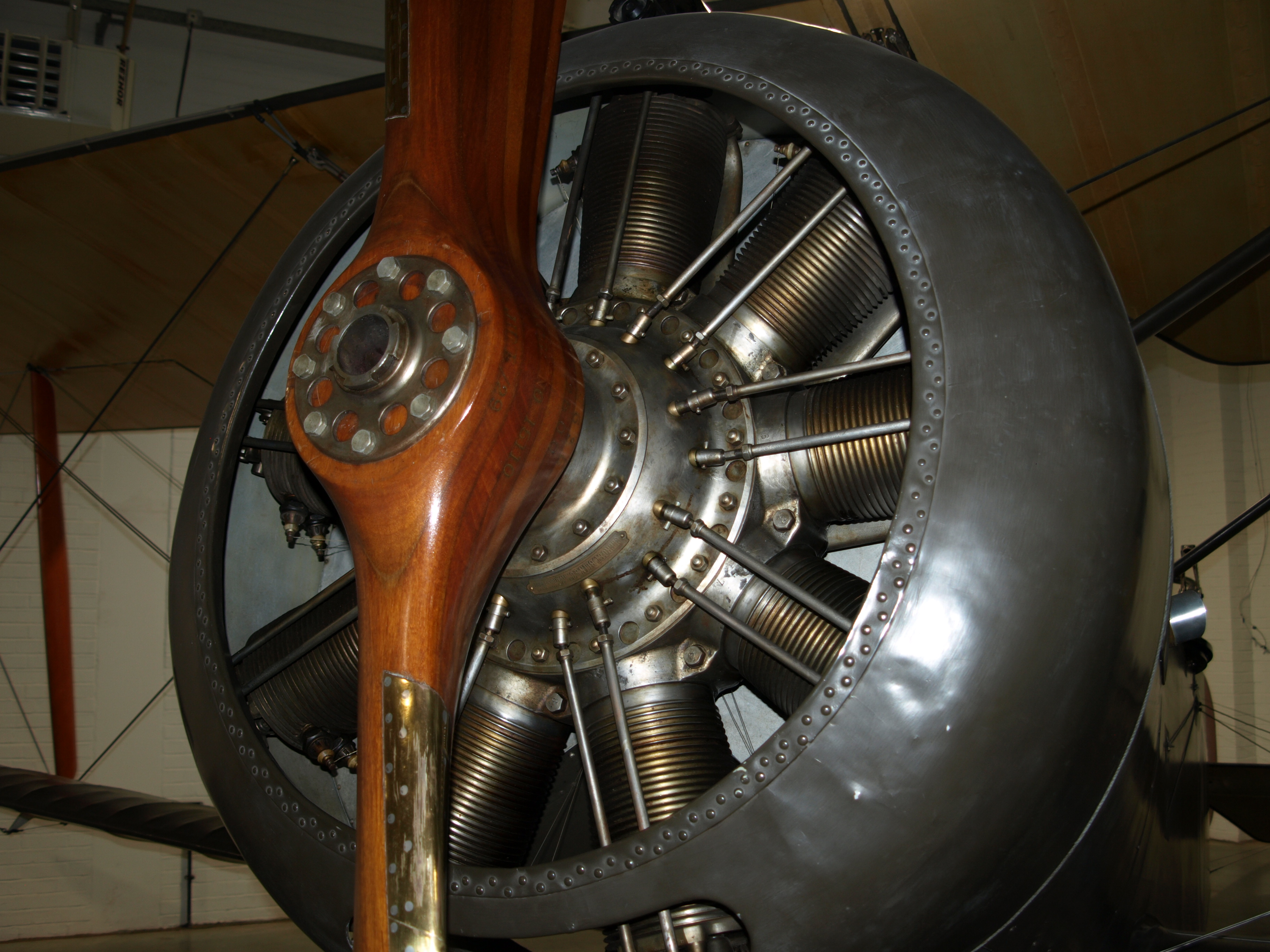
Clerget 9B

Data from Lumsden.

=== General characteristics ===
- Type: Nine-cylinder air-cooled rotary engine
- Bore: 120 mm (4.72 in)
- Stroke: 160 mm (6.30 in)
- Displacement: 16.29 L (994.08 cu in)
- Length: 920 mm (36.22 in)
- Diameter: 1,020 mm (40.15 in)
- Dry weight: 173 kg (381 lb)

=== Components ===
- Valvetrain: Single inlet and exhaust valves operated by pushrods and rockers
- Fuel system: Bloctube carburettor
- Fuel type: Gasoline mixed with Castor oil lubricant
- Oil system: Castor oil mixed with fuel
- Cooling system: Air-cooled

=== Performance ===
- Power output: 97 kW (130 hp) at 1,250 rpm
- Specific power: 0.1308 hp/cu in (5.953 kW/L)
- Compression ratio: 4.56:1
- Specific fuel consumption: 0.564 L/kW/hour(0.74 pt/hp/hour)
- Oil consumption: 0.0686 L/kW/hour (0.09 pt/hp/hour)
- Power-to-weight ratio: 0.563 kW/kg (0.341 hp/lb)

== See also ==
- Clerget aircraft engines

Related development

- Bentley BR1
- Bentley BR2

Comparable engines

- Gnome Monosoupape
- Le Rhône 9J

Related lists

- List of aircraft engines
