= Le Rhône 9J =

Rotary 9-cylinder piston aircraft engine

9J
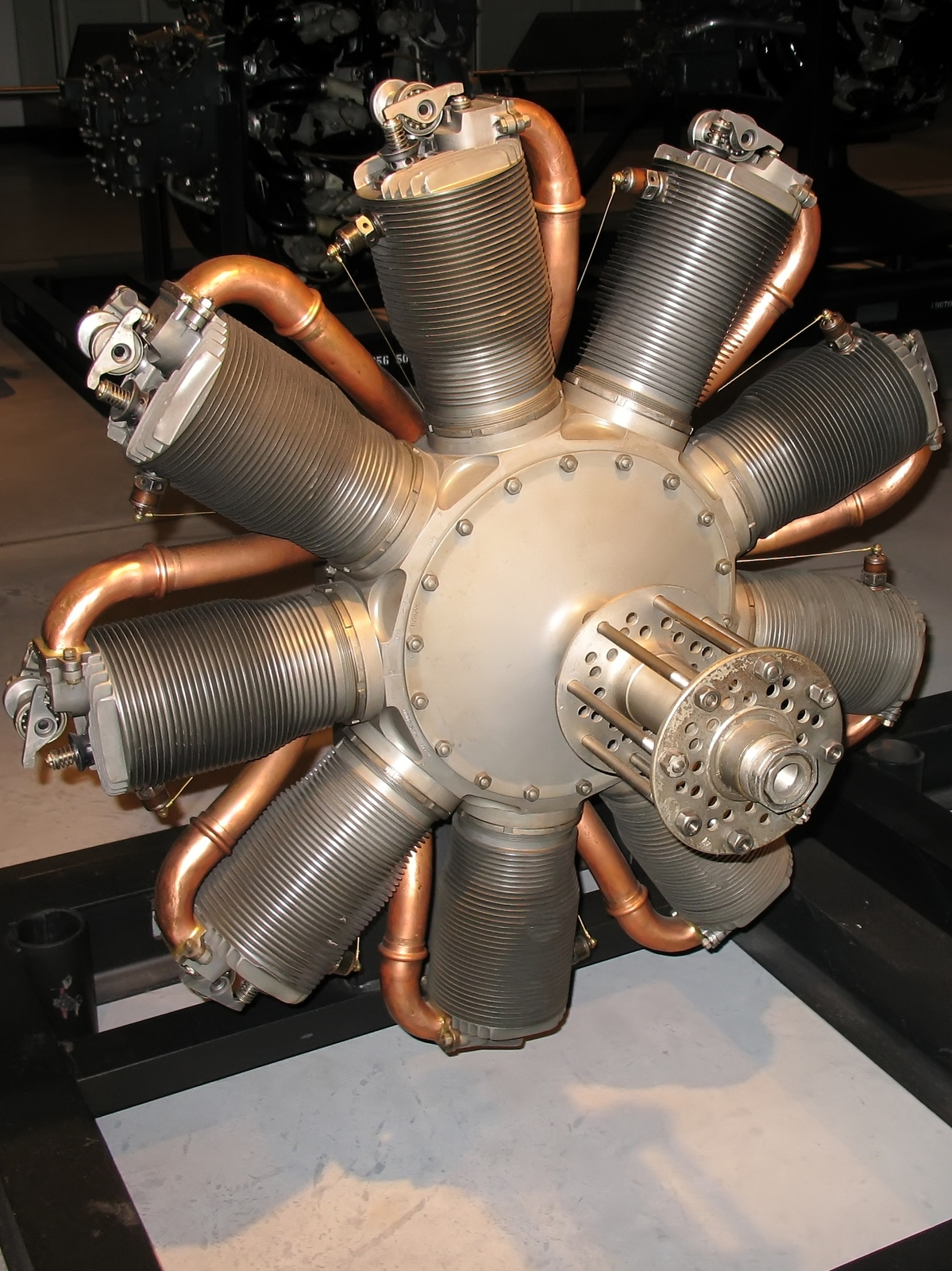
- Le Rhône 9J on display at the Steven F. Udvar-Hazy Center
- Type: Rotary engine
- National origin: France
- Manufacturer: Gnome et Rhône
- First run: 1913
- Major applications: Hanriot HD.1, Sopwith Camel, Fokker Dr.1
- Number built: approx 12,000
- Developed from: Le Rhône 9C
- Variants: Oberursel Ur.II

The Rhône 9J is a nine-cylinder rotary aircraft engine produced in France by Gnome et Rhône. Also known as the Rhône 110 hp in a reference to its nominal power rating, the engine was fitted to a number of military aircraft types of the First World War. Le Rhône 9J engines were produced under license in Great Britain by W.H. Allen Son & Company of Bedford, and in Germany by Motorenfabrik Oberursel where it was sold as the Oberursel Ur.II.

In common with other Le Rhône series engines, the 9J featured highly visible copper induction pipes and used a single push-pull rod to operate its two overhead valves. The main visual difference between the 9J and the earlier, less powerful Le Rhône 9C engine is that the copper intake manifold tubing (with round section lower ends) on the 110 hp 9J is attached to the crankcase behind the cylinders, whereas on the 9C (80 hp) the intake manifolds (with rectangular lower ends) are fully visible from the front.

Examples of Le Rhône 9J engines are on public display in aviation museums, with several remaining airworthy, powering restored and authentic reproductions of vintage aircraft.

== Variants ==
Le Rhône 9Ja
(1916) 110 hp (82 kW), nine-cylinder rotary engine. 953 built by W.H. Allen Son & Co.
Le Rhône 9Jb
(1916) 130 hp (97 kW), nine-cylinder rotary engine.
Le Rhône 9Jby
(1916) 130 hp (97 kW), nine-cylinder rotary engine.
Le Rhône M-2
production in the USSR post-WWI, 120 hp (89 kW)

== Applications ==
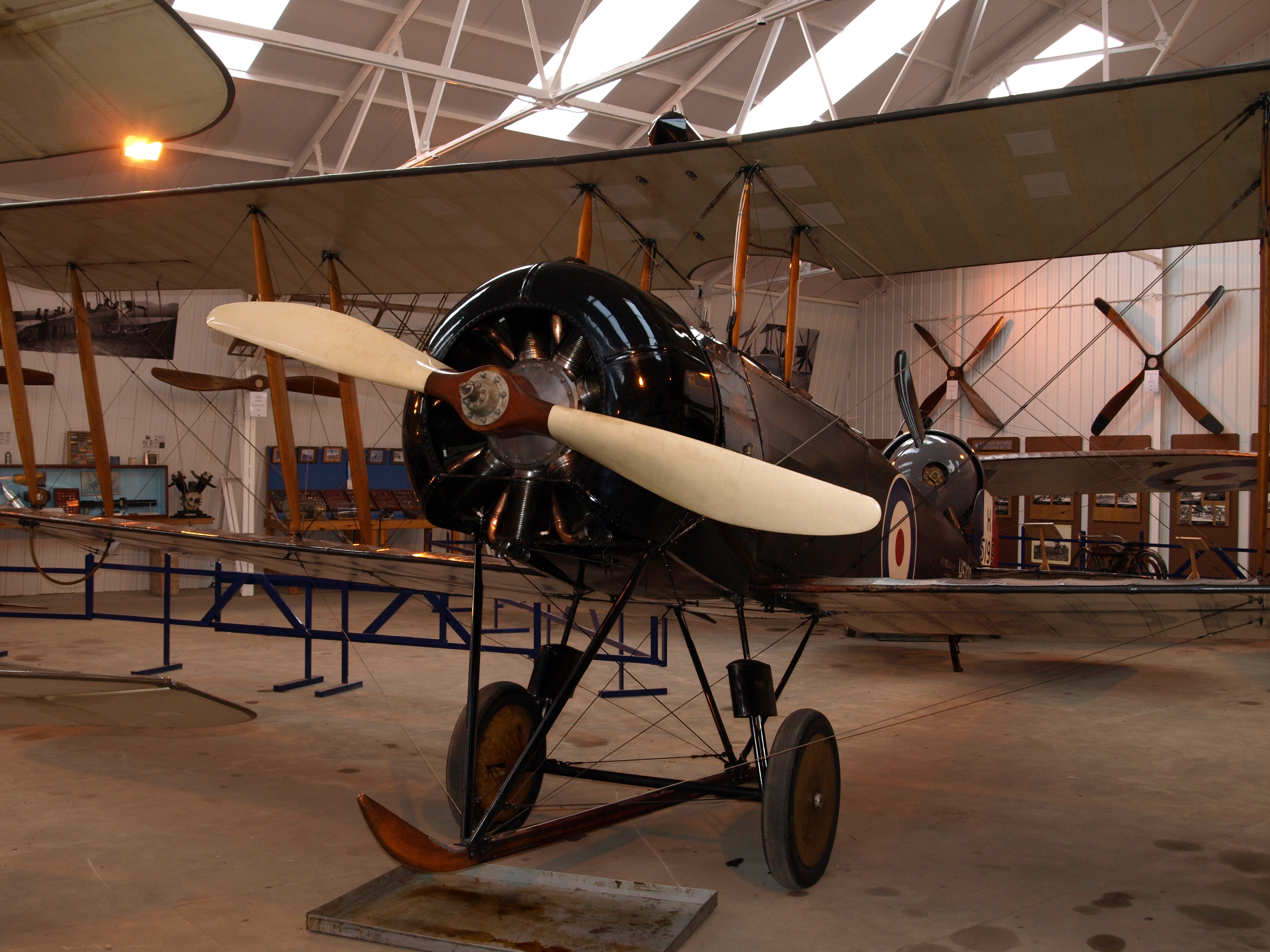
Le Rhône 110 hp engine installed in an airworthy Avro 504 biplane

Le Rhône 9Ja

- Airco DH.2
- Airco DH.5
- Armstrong Whitworth F.K.10
- Avro 504
- Bristol M.1
- Cierva C.6
- Hanriot HD.1
- Fokker V.4 (F.I 103/17 - Werner Voss)
- Morane-Saulnier AC
- Nieuport 16
- Nieuport 17
- Nieuport 20
- Royal Aircraft Factory F.E.8
- Sands Fokker Dr.1 Triplane
- Sopwith 1½ Strutter
- Sopwith Camel
- Sopwith Gnu
- Sopwith Pup
- Sopwith Swallow
- SPAD S.A-2
- TNCA Serie E
- Vickers E.S.1
- Vickers F.B.12
- Vickers F.B.19

Le Rhône 9Jb

- Morane-Saulnier AC
- Nieuport 17, 23 and 23bis
- Nieuport 24 and 24bis
- Nieuport 27

Le Rhône 9Jby

- Sopwith Camel
- Bristol Scout

Oberursel Ur.II

- Fokker D.VI (first prototype)
- Fokker D.VIII
- Fokker Dr.I
- Fokker S.IV
- Fokker V.9
- Fokker V.16
- Fokker V.17
- Fokker V.25
- Fokker V.33

== Survivors ==
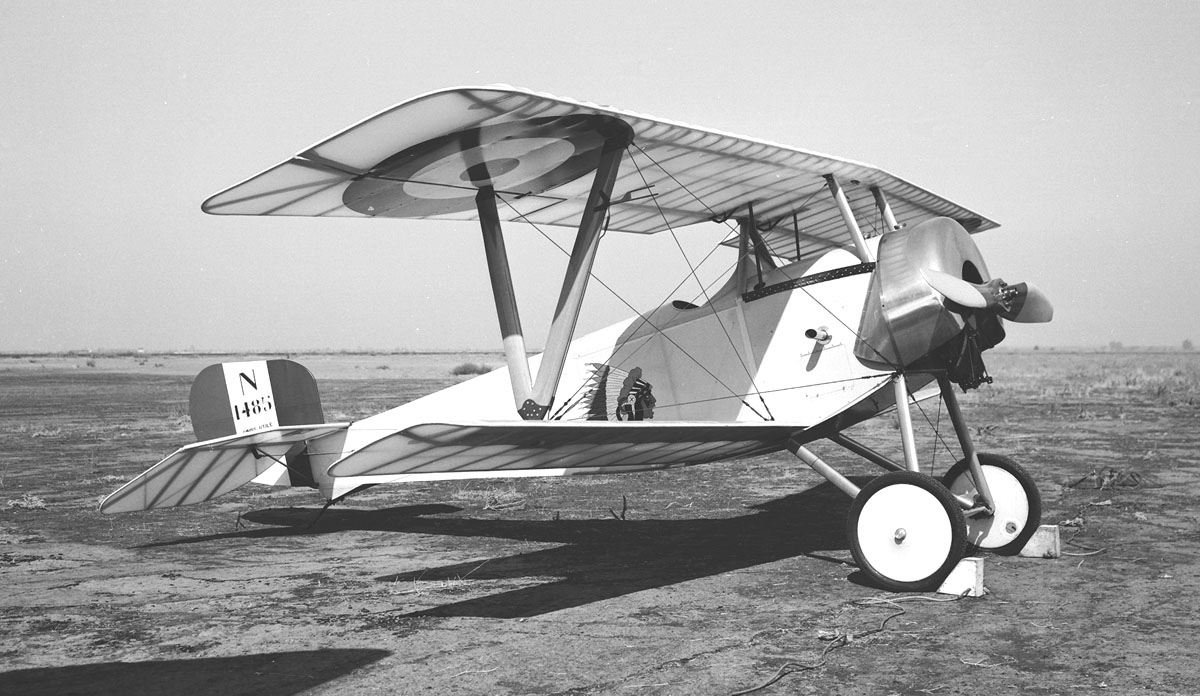
The Addems-Pfeifer Nieuport 11 replica pictured at Porterville, CA in 1962.

A Bristol M.1 replica, owned and operated by the Shuttleworth Collection remains airworthy and is powered by a Le Rhône 9J engine. The collection's airworthy Avro 504 is also powered by a 110 hp Le Rhône rotary engine. The reproduction Avro 504 at Old Rhinebeck Aerodrome has also flown with an original Le Rhone 9J powerplant, as was Cole Palen's first reproduction Fokker Dr.I triplane (now retired) for Old Rhinebeck's airshows in the 1960s, bearing American registration N3221.

A full-scale Nieuport 11 replica built by Walt Pfeifer and Joe Pfeifer in the early 1960s, now operated by The Vintage Aviator Limited, flies in New Zealand with a Le Rhone 9C.

== Engines on display ==
Preserved Le Rhône 9J engines are on public display at the following museums:

- Steven F. Udvar-Hazy Center
- Shuttleworth Collection
- Museum of Hungarian Aviation
- Museo Nacional de Aeronáutica de Argentina, Buenos Aires, Argentina

== Specifications (Le Rhône 9Ja) ==
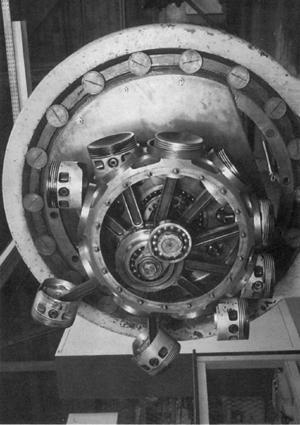
Le Rhône 9J crankshaft, pistons, and connecting rods

Data from Lumsden.

=== General characteristics ===
- Type: Nine-cylinder, single-row rotary engine
- Bore: 112 mm (4.41 in)
- Stroke: 170 mm (6.63 in)
- Displacement: 14.94 L (911.4 cu in)
- Diameter: 100.5 cm (39.6 in)
- Dry weight: 146.5 kg (323 lb)

=== Components ===
- Valvetrain: Cam-operated single rocker for both inlet and exhaust valves
- Oil system: Castor oil, total loss
- Cooling system: Air-cooled

=== Performance ===
- Power output: 135 hp (100 kW) at 1,350 rpm
- Compression ratio: 5:1

== See also ==
Comparable engines

- Bentley BR1
- Clerget 9B
- Gnome Monosoupape

Related lists

- List of aircraft engines
