= Marcel Hugues =

French flying ace

Marcel Anatole Hugues
- Born: 5 January 1892; Belfort, France
- Died: 14 July 1982 (aged 90); Fontainebleau, France
- Military career
- Allegiance: France
- Branch: Infantry; aviation
- Service years: 1910–1933; 1939–19xx
- Rank: Lieutenant Colonel
- Units: 23e Regiment d'Infanterie; 172e Regiment d'Infanterie; 407e Regiment d'Infanterie; Escadrille 22; Escadrille 77; Escadrille Spa.81
- Commands: Escadrille 95; Groupe de Chasse II/5
- Conflicts: World War I World War II
- Awards: Légion d'honneur Médaille militaire Croix de Guerre; British Military Cross
- Other work: Returned to service as a fighter group commander in World War II

Lieutenant Colonel Marcel Anatole Marie Esprit Hugues (5 January 1892 - 14 July 1982) was a French flying ace during World War I. He served before, during, and after the war, as he was a professional soldier. Later, he came out of retirement for World War II service and led Groupe de Chasse II/5 in its opening campaign against the invading Germans.

== Early life ==
Marcel Anatole Hugues was born in Belfort, France on 5 January 1892.

== Infantry service ==
Hugues volunteered for a three-year enlistment in the French military on 30 September 1910. He spent most of this enlistment in the 23e Regiment d'Infanterie; however, on 15 April 1913, he transferred to the 172e Regiment. On 30 September 1913, he re-enlisted for two more years. On 1 April 1915, he was shifted into the 407e Regiment. On 22 September 1915, he was forwarded to the Groupe d'Aviation at Avord.

During his five years in the infantry, Hugues had been steadily promoted to corporal on 25 April 1911, to sergeant on 28 September 1912, to sergent-fourrier on 27 February 1913, to Sergent-Major on 2 August 1914, to adjutant just 24 days later, and finally commissioned as an acting sous lieutenant on 26 April 1915.

== Flying service during World War I ==
Hugues's 1915 Christmas present was confirmation in his commission as an officer. On 10 February 1916, he was assigned to Escadrille MF 22 (the 'MF' denoting the squadron used Maurice Farman aircraft). On 8 May 1916, he was sent to pilot's training at Pau. On 17 July 1916, he was awarded his Military Pilot's Brevet, No. 1260. On 23 September 1916, he was assigned to Escadrille N77 ('N' for Nieuport). He scored his first victory with them, on 14 February 1917. He was forwarded to Escadrille N97 on 18 March 1917. With this unit, he scored twice more; his latter win, on 4 June 1917, was shared with Armand Pinsard. He was then transferred to Escadrille N81 on 30 April 1917.

He became a balloon buster for his first official win for N81, when he shot down a German observation balloon on 22 July 1917. He then ran off a succession of seven shared wins, teaming with Adrien L. J. Leps, Gabriel Guérin, André Herbelin, and several other French pilots. Hugues ended 1917 with his tenth victory on 23 December.

On 7 March 1918, he was appointed to command of Escadrille Spa95 ('Spa' meaning Spad). He would score twice more with this command, on 11 April and 3 May 1918. He ended the war with twelve confirmed and four unconfirmed aerial victories. He had been promoted to lieutenant on 6 July 1917, and was further advanced, to Capitaine, on 28 June 1918.

== Post World War I service ==
Hugues kept on soldiering after the war, remaining in service until his retirement in 1933. He returned to his country's defense for World War II, commanding Groupe de Chasse II/5. His group used Curtis Hawk 75s in their battle against the invading Germans, sending down at least 60 enemy planes for the loss of two French pilots.

Hugues finally ended his martial career as a lieutenant colonel. He was raised in rank within the Légion d'honneur to Commandeur. In addition to the Médaille militaire, he had been awarded the Croix de Guerre with eight palmes and an étoile de vermeil, and the British Military Cross.

== Bibliography ==
- Over the Front: A Complete Record of the Fighter Aces and Units of the United States and French Air Services, 1914-1918 Norman L. R. Franks, Frank W. Bailey. Grub Street, 1992. ISBN 0-948817-54-2, ISBN 978-0-948817-54-0.
