= Adrien L. J. Leps =

French flying ace

Adrien Louis Jacques Leps
- Born: September 27, 1893; Angers, France
- Died: Post 1945
- Military career
- Allegiance: France
- Branch: Cavalry; aviation
- Service years: 1913–1919; World War II
- Rank: Lieutenant colonel
- Units: 9e Regiment de Hussards, 1e Regiment de Hussards, Escadrille 67, Escadrille 81
- Commands: Escadrille 81
- Awards: Légion d'honneur, Croix de Guerre with nine palmes, 1939–1945 Croix de Guerre, British Military Cross
- Other work: Also served in World War II

Major Adrien Louis Jacques Leps was a French World War I flying ace credited with twelve confirmed aerial victories, as well as two probables. He served originally in the cavalry, before shifting to flying. In later years, he served under General Armand Pinsard during World War II.

== Early life ==
Adrien Louis Jacques Leps was born on 27 September 1893 in Angers.

== Cavalry service ==
Leps entered the 9e Regiment de Hussards on 9 October 1913 as a "soldate de 2e classe". He was promoted to the rank of enlisted Brigadier on 19 April 1914. He went into action with his regiment on 2 August 1914. A month later, on 5 September 1914, he was promoted to Maréchal-des-logis. Two months later, on 4 November 1914, he transferred to the 1e Regiment de Hussards. On 24 December 1914, he had been dubbed an Aspirant. On 17 April 1915, he was commissioned as sous lieutenant. He was severely wounded in action on 9 July 1915, and cited in dispatches. On 3 October 1915, he was forwarded to Aéronautique Militaire as an observer/gunner.

== Aerial service ==
Leps was initially assigned to Escadrille N67 (the 'N' denoting that the unit used Nieuports). On 15 July 1916, he was forwarded for pilot's training at Amberieu. He received Military Pilot's Brevet No. 4312 on 23 August 1916. He then reported for reassignment on 2 November. On 14 December 1916, he was posted to Escadrille N81.

Adrien Leps scored his first aerial victories on 16 March 1917, downing an Albatros reconnaissance plane and another unidentified German two-seater. On 30 March, his award of the Légion d'honneur cited these wins. He next shot down an enemy fighter plane on 27 June 1917. A week later, on 4 July, Leps was promoted to Lieutenant. He would score two more triumphs before year's end, sharing with Marcel A. Hugues and André Herbelin.

Leps was elevated to command of Escadrille 81 on 24 February 1918, as the squadron re-equipped with Spads. He knocked down a German plane in a solo victory on 6 April 1918. In May 1918, he teamed with Gabriel Guérin and Paul Santelli in wins over three German observation balloons and an Albatros; on the 11th of the month, he received the British Military Cross. On 6 June, he shared a win over another balloon with Pierre Cardon. On the 15th, he singlehandedly shot down his fifth enemy gasbag, becoming a balloon buster ace. In the wake of this dozenth victory, he was upgraded to capitaine on 14 August 1918. By war's end, he had the Croix de Guerre with nine palmes to accompany his Légion d'honneur and MC.

== Post World War I ==
Leps commanded Escadrille 81 until its disbandment on 31 December 1919.

He returned to service for World War II, was assigned as a major to Groupe de Chasse No. 21 under General Armand Pinsard. He was very seriously wounded by a German bombing on 6 June 1940, and took no part in any military action during the remainder of the war. For his service, he earned a promotion to Commandeur of the Légion d'honneur, the 1939–1945 Croix de Guerre, and a final promotion to lieutenant colonel. Following World War II, he pursued his passion for tennis, he became a tennis referee at the Roland-Garros championship.
