= Henri Albert Péronneau =

French flying ace

- Born: 4 August 1890; Aunay-sous-Auneau, France
- Died: 10 August 1960 (aged 70); Tunisia
- Military career
- Allegiance: France
- Branch: Engineers; aviation
- Service years: 1912–1954
- Rank: Capitaine
- Units: 1er Group d'Aviation; Escadrille 49; Escadrille 65; Escadrille 81
- Awards: Légion d'honneur Médaille militaire Croix de Guerre with eight palmes and an etoile d'argent Mentioned in Dispatches

Capitaine Henri Albert Péronneau was a World War I flying ace credited with nine confirmed aerial victories. He served his nation for more than four decades.

== World War I ==
Péronneau was serving as a noncommissioned officer in the engineers in western Morocco in 1912 when he transferred to aviation. The beginning of World War I saw him assigned to 1er Group d'Aviation. On 1 June 1915, he started pilot's training at Avord. On 30 November, he received Military Pilot's Brevet No. 2026. On 30 March 1916, he was posted to Escadrille 49. He moved on to Escadrille 65 on 26 May. Péronneau was mentioned in dispatches for flying 150 combat hours and engaging in a dozen dogfights. On 10 October, he was promoted to Adjutant. He received his final assignment of the war on 26 December 1916, when he transferred to Escadrille N81 ('N' denoting a Nieuport squadron).

On 25 August 1917, he was promoted to Adjutant Chef. On 22 September, he claimed victory over a Halberstadt two-seater reconnaissance plane, shared with Pierre De Cazenove De Pradines. It was confirmed on the next day. Péronneau was mentioned in dispatches again, for that victory, as well as for damaging two enemy planes during the preceding month; he would be mentioned five more times in dispatches. On 30 October, the team of de Cazenove de Pradines and Péronneau downed another two-seater, this one over Verdun. Additional solo wins by Péronneau drove his total to four by the year's end. On 12 November, he was awarded the Médaille militaire.

Escadrille 81 was re-equipped with Spads for 1918; Péronneau used his to down his fifth victim on the third day of the new year. The next day, he shared a win with Marcel Marc Dhôme. There was a two-month lapse before Péronneau teamed with André Herbelin for another triumph. Péronneau's last two victories occurred on the 1st and 31 July, and were again shared with Pierre de Cazenove de Pradines. On 9 September 1918, Péronneau was awarded the Légion d'honneur as a Chevalier.

== Post World War I ==
Péronneau stayed in service after the war. On 28 June 1928, he was promoted to Capitaine. He was elevated to Officier in the Légion d'honneur before his retirement on 4 August 1954. He died in Tunisia on 10 August 1960.
