= Andre Barcat =

French WWI flying ace

André Jean Louis Barcat
- Born: 8 November 1896; Paris, France
- Died: 16 July 1918 (aged 21); Malmy, Marne, France
- Military career
- Allegiance: France
- Branch: French Army
- Service years: 1915–1918
- Rank: Sous-lieutenant
- Units: 30e Régiment d'Artillerie; Escadrille F 206; 83e Régiment d'Artillerie; 81e Régiment d'Artillerie; Escadrille SPA 155; Escadrille SPA 153
- Conflicts: World War I
- Awards: Légion d'honneur Croix de guerre

Sous-lieutenant André Jean Louis Barcat (8 November 1896 – 16 July 1918) was a French World War I flying ace credited with five aerial victories.

== World War I service ==
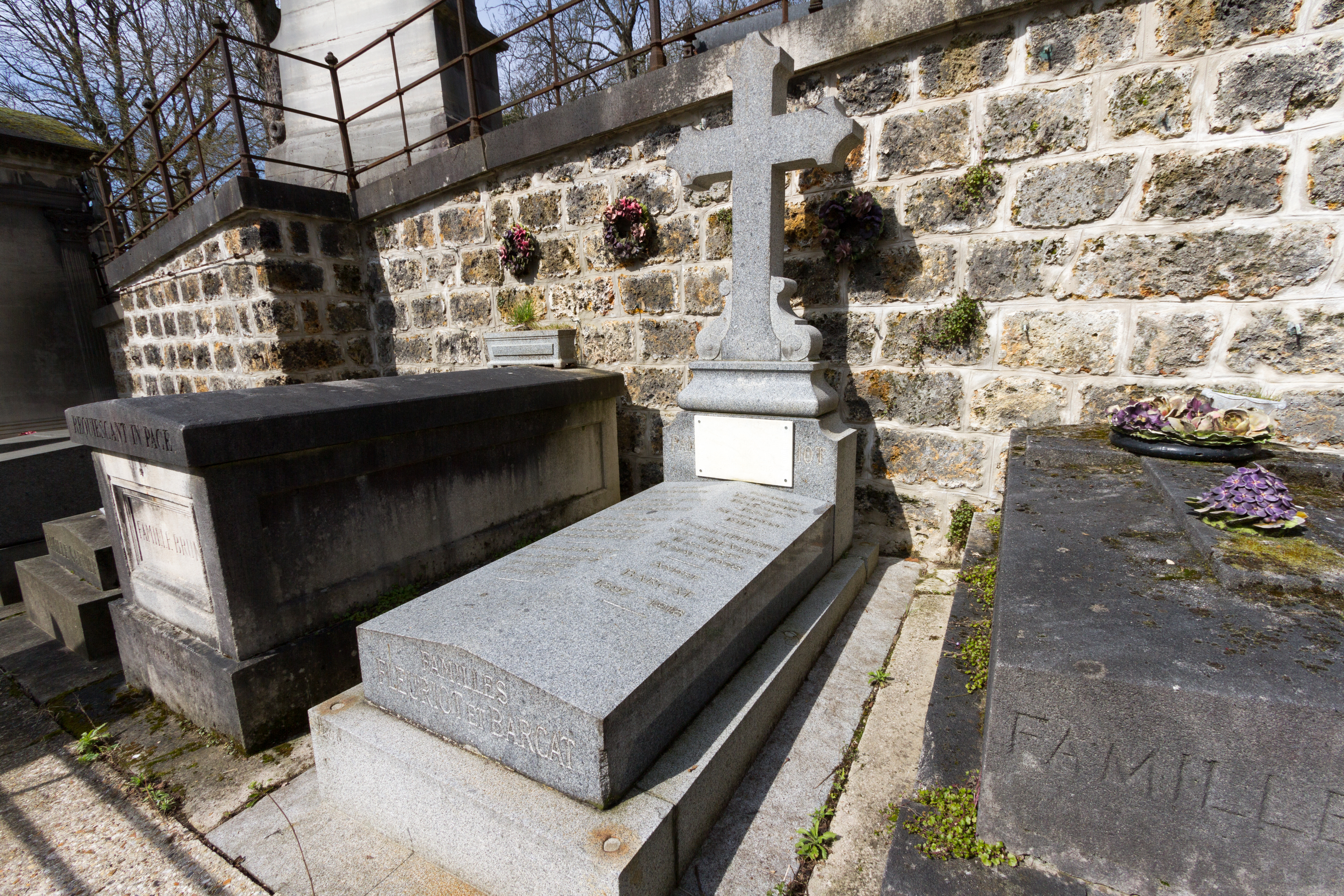
Père-Lachaise Cemetery.

Barcat entered the army and was posted to the 30e Régiment d'Artillerie on 12 April 1915. On 12 June he was sent to the military flying school at Fontainebleau, and was appointed an aspirant on 15 September 1915. On 13 December 1915 he was posted to Escadrille F 206, to fly as an observer for six months before returning to Fontainebleau on 1 July 1916, where he was promoted to the provisional rank of sous-lieutenant on 27 September. He then served in the 83e Régiment d'Artillerie, transferring to the 81e Régiment d'Artillerie on 23 December 1916.

On 15 September 1917 Barcat transferred Aéronautique Militaire and was sent to the military flying school at Chartres to train as a pilot, receiving his military pilot's brevet at Avord on 28 November. He was posted to Escadrille SPA 155 on 11 February 1918, but soon after, on 22 February, was transferred to Escadrille SPA 153. On 15 March Barcat flew one of six aircraft from his unit escorting a formation of nineteen Breguet 14 bombers on an attack on the railway station at Neuflize. During the mission Barcat attacked an enemy two-seater, but without result. His first confirmed aerial victory came on 21 March 1918 when Barcat (flying a SPAD S.XIII) and Sous-lieutenant Gilbert de Guingand of Escadrille SPA.48 shot down in flames an enemy aircraft near Mont Cornille, east of Reims. On 2 May 1918, while on patrol, Barcat (now flying a SPAD S.VII) was credited with shooting down one of three Pfalz D.III fighters engaged by himself, Sous-lieutenant Louvat and Sergeant Morel, with Lieutenant Auguste Lahoulle from Escadrille SPA 154, over Montdidier. One of the other D.III's was sufficiently damaged to have to make a forced landing in the French lines nearby. On 15 May, during a particularly active day, Barcat and Adjudant Bernard Artigau shot down a Rumpler two-seater reconnaissance aircraft, which crashed north of Thory. On 19 May Barcat was taking Maréchal-des-logis Arrault, a newly arrived pilot, out on a training patrol, when they encountered and attacked an enemy scout, forcing it to land near Ailly-sur-Noye where the German pilot was taken prisoner. Barcat's fifth victory came on 2 June, when he and Maréchal-des-logis Georges Halberger set fire to an observation balloon east of Thory. With this victory Barcat became the first 'ace' in his unit. On 13 June 1918 Barcat and Halberger claimed two Fokker D.VIIs shot down near Saint-Pierre-Aigle. Finally, on 16 July, during a day of aggressive German attacks, Barcat was shot down in flames over Malmy and was killed.

Barcat was posthumously made a Chevalier of the Légion d'honneur on 30 July 1919, his citation reading:

"An officer of admirable strength, a model of discipline and tenacity in combat. Killed on 16 July 1918, having reported his fifth victory. He has been cited."

He also received the Croix de guerre with three palms and the etoile de Vermeil ("silver-gilt star").
