= Escadrille Spa.153 =

- Active: 1917–1918
- Country: France
- Branch: French Air Service
- Type: Fighter Squadron
- Battle honours: Mentioned in dispatches

Escadrille Spa.153 (originally Escadrille N.153) was a French fighter squadron active from 1 July 1917 to war's end. It was Mentioned in dispatches for its proficiency. By the Armistice, the squadron was credited with 10 German airplanes and three observation balloons destroyed.

== History ==
Escadrille Spa.153 was established at Étampes-Montdesir, France on 1 July 1917 with Nieuport 24 fighters; it was then dubbed Escadrille N.153. A week after its founding, it was assigned to a provisional Group de Combat to support a French field army, III Armee. In November 1917, the squadron was reinforced by improved Nieuport 24bis fighters, even as it began to receive SPAD VIIs and SPAD XIIIs. After its refitting with the SPADs, it became known as Escadrille Spa.153.

On 20 January 1918, Escadrille Spa.153 was posted to Groupe de Combat 18. The squadron served with this Groupe through moves to fight for a number of French field armies. On 9 September, it began fighting for the American 1st Army at the Battle of Saint-Mihiel. It was withdrawn to IV Armee on the 24th, and served there until war's end. On 4 October 1918, it was Mentioned in dispatches. The squadron was credited with downing 10 German aircraft and three observation balloons.

== Commanding officers ==
- Lieutenant Jean Gigadot: 1 July 1917 - 21 September 1918
- Lieutenant Yvan Viguier: 21 September 1918 - war's end

== Notable members ==
- Sous lieutenant Andre Barcat
- Adjutant Georges Halberger

== Aircraft ==
- Nieuport 24: 1 July 1917
- Nieuport 24bis: November 1917
- SPAD VII: November 1917
- SPAD XIII: November 1917
