= Escadrille Spa.81 =

Escadrille N.81 / SPA.81
- Active: 1916–1918
- Country: France
- Branch: French Air Service
- Type: Fighter Squadron
- Battle honours: Twice Cited in orders; Fourragere of the Croix de Guerre

Escadrille Spa.81 was a French fighter squadron active in World War warfare during 1917 and 1918. With nine flying aces in its ranks, it downed 88 German aircraft. It was twice Cited in orders and entitled to the Fourragere of the Croix de Guerre.

== History ==
Escadrille Spa.81 was formed on 26 December 1916 under the sobriquet Escadrille N.81. It began at Villacoublay Airfield, with a mixed bag of Nieuports. Later on, it would rearm with SPADs and change its unit designation to Escadrille Spa.81.

It was assigned to VI Armee on 5 January 1917. It moved to VII Armee on 29 January. On 17 April, it moved to IV Armee; shortly thereafter, it was incorporated in Groupe de Combat 15 (GC15, in short). GC15 was reassigned to II Armee sector on 25 July 1917. From then until war's end, as part of a larger formation, Escadrille Spa.81 was frequently shifted into tactical situations on the Western Front in a "fire brigade" fashion.

In January 1918, they were Cited in orders. Its second citation came on 4 October 1918. This entitled the unit to display the Fourragere of the Croix de Guerre. By the 11 November 1918 ceasefire, the squadron was credited with destroying 88 German aircraft.

== Commanding officers ==
- Capitaine Maurice Mandinaud: 26 December 1916 - killed in action 10 March 1917
- Lieutenant Raymond Bailly: 10 March 1917
- Lieutenant Adrien L. J. Leps: 24 February 1918.

== Notable members ==
- Capitaine Marcel A. Hugues
- Lieutenant (later Major) Adrien L. J. Leps
- Sous lieutenant (later Colonel) Marcel Marc Dhôme
- Sous lieutenant Andre Herbelin
- Sous lieutenant Pierre De Cazenove De Pradines
- Adjutant Henri Peronneau
- Adjutant Maurice Rousselle
- Maréchal des logis Paul Santelli
- Maréchal des logis Pierre Cardon.

== Aircraft ==
- Nieuport XII two-seater reconnaissance craft: 26 December 1916
- Nieuport XVII fighters: 26 December 1916
- SPAD fighters.
- SPAD VII: 1917 - 1918
- SPAD XIII: 1918
