= Paul Santelli =

French World War I flying ace

Paul Marie Raphael Santelli
- Born: 12 February 1898; Miramas, France
- Died: 15 January 1928 (aged 29); Uruguay
- Military career
- Allegiance: France
- Branch: Artillery; aviation
- Rank: Maréchal-des-logis
- Unit: Escadrille Spa.81
- Awards: Médaille militaire Croix de Guerre

Maréchal-des-logis Paul Marie Raphael Santelli was a French World War I flying ace credited with seven aerial victories. He was a balloon buster, all of his victories being over observation balloons.

== Biography ==
See also aerial victory standards of World War I

Paul Marie Raphael Santelli was born in Miramas, France on 12 February 1898.

On 18 April 1917, he became an artilleryman. He soon transferred to aviation training, receiving his Military Pilot's Brevet on 3 October 1917. He then underwent advanced training before being posted to Escadrille Spa.81 as a SPAD S.7 fighter pilot on 1 February 1918.

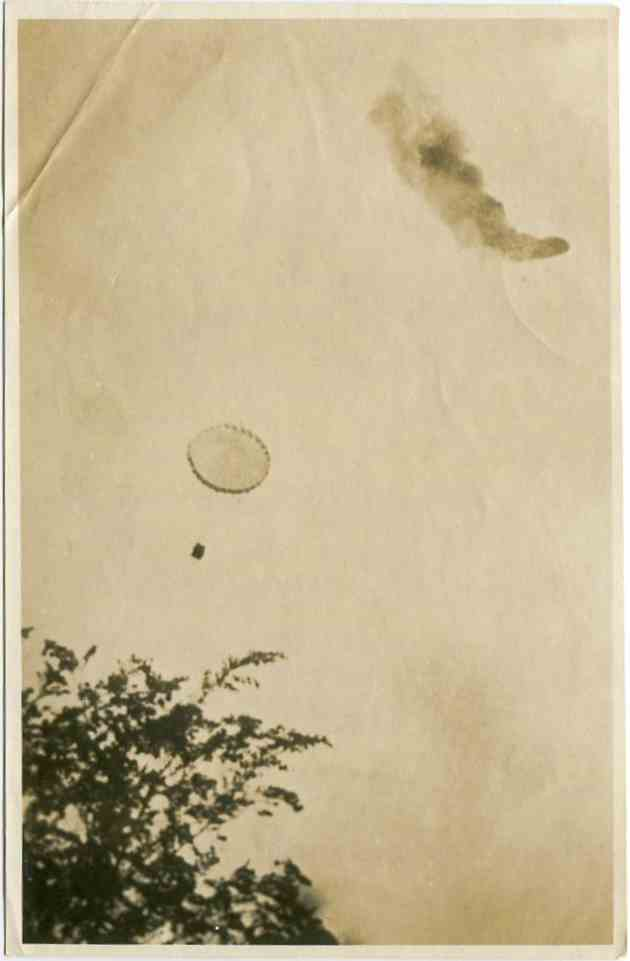
Success for Santelli usually meant a balloon afire. Here, an observer leaps for his life.

During the Summer of 1918, beginning 22 May and running into July, Santelli triumphed in the extraordinarily hazardous task of shooting down seven German observation balloons. Given their elevated view of the battle grounds from the balloons' gondolas, aerial observers could gather and pass on vital military intelligence information. For that reason, fighter pilots from either side attacked and downed balloons; because of that, the balloons were heavily defended by antiaircraft guns and fighter patrols. Santelli's success was aided by the support offered by fellow aces Adrien L. J. Leps and Marcel Marc Dhome.

By war's end, Paul Santelli had flown over 103 combat hours. For his valor, he was awarded the Médaille militaire and the Croix de Guerre.

Santelli's interest in aviation outlasted the war, as he was killed in a flying accident in Uruguay on 15 January 1928.
