= René Montrion =

- Born: 7 August 1896; Paris, France
- Died: 28 June 1918 (aged 21)
- Military career
- Allegiance: France
- Branch: French Army
- Rank: Adjutant
- Units: 108e Regiment d'Infanterie; Escadrille 48
- Conflicts: World War I
- Awards: Médaille militaire Croix de Guerre with seven Palmes and an étoile de vermeil Mentioned in Dispatches at least 6 times

Adjutant René Montrion (7 August 1896 – 28 June 1918) was a French flying ace during World War I. He was credited with eleven confirmed aerial and eight unconfirmed victories.

== Early life ==
René Montrion was born in Paris on 7 August 1896.

== Military service ==
Montrion volunteered for duty while still only 18 years old. After extensive infantry combat experience, which brought a mention in dispatches on 26 September 1915, he transferred to the Army's aviation branch. On 9 October 1916, he began pilot's training at Dijon. Military Pilot's Brevet No. 5328 was awarded to him on 8 February 1917 before he underwent advanced training at Avord and Pau. On 6 April 1917, he reported to Escadrille 48 as a SPAD pilot. On the 26th, he began a string of ten victories while teamed with such other aces as Jacques Roques, Gilbert de Guingand, Armand de Turenne, and René Dousinelle. By his eleventh victory on 17 June 1918, he had been proposed for the Légion d'honneur. He was killed in action on 28 June 1918 by Venezuela's pioneer aviator, Carlos Meyer Baldó, before it could be awarded.

== Honors and awards ==
"Incomparable pilot, audacious, adroit and very brave. On 30 September [1917] he downed two enemy planes, bringing therewith the number of his victories to seven. Cited in orders six times." Médaille Militaire citation

He also had been awarded the Croix de Guerre with seven palmes and an etoile de vermeil.
