= Bernard Artigau =

French flying ace

- Born: 28 August 1894; Licq-Athérey, France
- Died: 3 May 1968 (aged 73); Buenos Aires, Argentina
- Burial place: l'Oeste de la Charcarita, Buenos Aires, Argentina
- Military career
- Allegiance: France
- Branch: French Army
- Service years: 1916–1919
- Rank: Sous lieutenant
- Units: 144eme Regiment d'Infanterie; Escadrille 15
- Awards: Légion d'honneur Médaille militaire Croix de Guerre; Croix de Guerre (Belgium); Mentioned in Dispatches six times
- Other work: Returned to service during World War II

Sous Lieutenant Bernard Artigau (28 August 1894 – 3 May 1968) was a French World War I flying ace credited with twelve aerial victories. He later became an airline pilot in South America, and returned to serve his nation again in World War II.

== Early life ==
Bernard Artigau was born in Licq-Athérey, France on 28 August 1894.

== 1916–1917 ==
Artigau was living in Argentina when World War I started. He was called up to active duty on 26 May 1916, and assigned to the 144eme Regiment d'Infanterie as an enlisted Soldat de 2e Classe. He requested pilot's duty, and was sent for training on Caudrons at Tours and Avord. He was promoted to Caporal on 23 March 1917. On 15 May, he received his Pilot's Brevet, No. 5894. He was assigned to Escadrille N15 (the 'N' denoting Nieuports) on 20 June. In August, he was promoted again, to Sergeant. At 1540 hours 4 September 1917, Artigau scored his first win. On 1 November, he helped down a two-seater reconnaissance aircraft. On 23 December, he closed out 1917 by sharing victory over another German two-seater with Gabriel Guérin.

== 1918 ==
On 3 February 1918, Artigau again teamed with Guérin to down an enemy aircraft over Nogent-l'Abbesse. A promotion to Adjutant for Artigau came in March. Artigau then tallied back to back triumphs on 11 and 12 April. He split two victories in May–one on the 15th with Andre Barcat and the other on the 27th with Armond J. Berthelot. June brought him wins on the 1st and 7th, and the Médaille militaire on the 25th. His eleventh victory came on 22 July, when he shot down a Rumpler. In October 1918, he was commissioned Sous Lieutenant. On the 28th of the month, he shot down a Fokker D.VII for his final win.

== Post World War I ==
Artigau returned to Argentina with 444 hours in his pilot's logbook, wearing not just the Médaille militaire, but both French and Belgian Croix de Guerres. He would receive the Légion d'honneur on 25 April 1919. He became a pioneering commercial pilot during the between-wars period. When World War II began, he was once again called up to his country's aid. Once World War II ended, Artigau went home to Buenos Aires. He died there on 3 May 1968.

== Honors and awards ==
Médaille militaire
"Non-commissioned officer driven by the highest spirit and devotion, which he has rapidly revealed during the course of difficult combats, and daily as a pursuit pilot full of bravery, endurance and skill. He recently downed in our lines, an enemy two-seater, reporting therewith his eighth victory. Three citations."

Chevalier de la Légion d'honneur
"Pursuit pilot beyond compare, on 28 October 1918 he reported his eleventh victory. Médaille Militaire for feats of war – six citations."
