= Gilbert de Guingand =

Gilbert Marie de Guingand
- Born: 21 July 1891; Viroflay, France
- Died: 22 October 1918 (aged 27); Revigny, France
- Military career
- Allegiance: France
- Branch: French Army
- Rank: Sous lieutenant
- Units: 21e Regiment d'Infanterie Coloniale; Escadrille 34; Escadrille 15; Escadrille 88; Escadrille 48
- Awards: Légion d'honneur Médaille militaire Croix de guerre (Belgium)

Sous lieutenant Gilbert Marie de Guingand was a French World War I flying ace credited with eight aerial victories before being killed in a flying accident.

== Early life ==
Gilbert Marie de Guingand was born at Viroflay, France on 21 July 1891. He began his military service in the 21e Regiment d'Infanterie Coloniale before transferring to aviation.

== World War I ==
After transferring to aviation service, de Guingand trained until he received Pilot's Brevet number 2722 on 21 February 1916. He was assigned to Escadrille C34, a Caudron squadron, in July 1916. He subsequently retrained as a fighter pilot. He was then posted to Escadrille N15, a Nieuwpoort unit. On 20 April 1917, he spent a single day in Escadrille N88 as it was forming; however, on 22 April he joined Escadrille N48, still another Nieuwpoort squadron. He began his string of aerial victories there. (Note: While the initial letter(s) such as "C", "N", "Spa", et cetera, in escadrille designations denoted the equipment assigned to the unit, there was often a lag in changing the unit's designation after it re-equipped.)

On 3 September 1917, he was wounded in action while in combat against several German aircraft. He then received the Médaille militaire for his valor; the award citation shows he had risen to the rank of Adjutant. He was also awarded the Belgian Croix de guerre. After recuperation, he returned to combat; as his squadron had upgraded to Spads, his final four victories were probably scored flying this type. At any rate, he ran his winning streak to eight confirmed victories by 7 June 1918, and was promoted to sous lieutenant in the process.

On 17 June 1918, he became a Chevalier of the Légion d'honneur as a reward for his fighting prowess. The citation not only refers to his eight credited victories, but also specifically to his highly hazardous practice of balloon busting. Additionally, the citation describes de Guingand being shot down behind enemy lines while on a reconnaissance and trench strafing sortie, as well as his subsequent evasion of the Germans and his return to French lines.

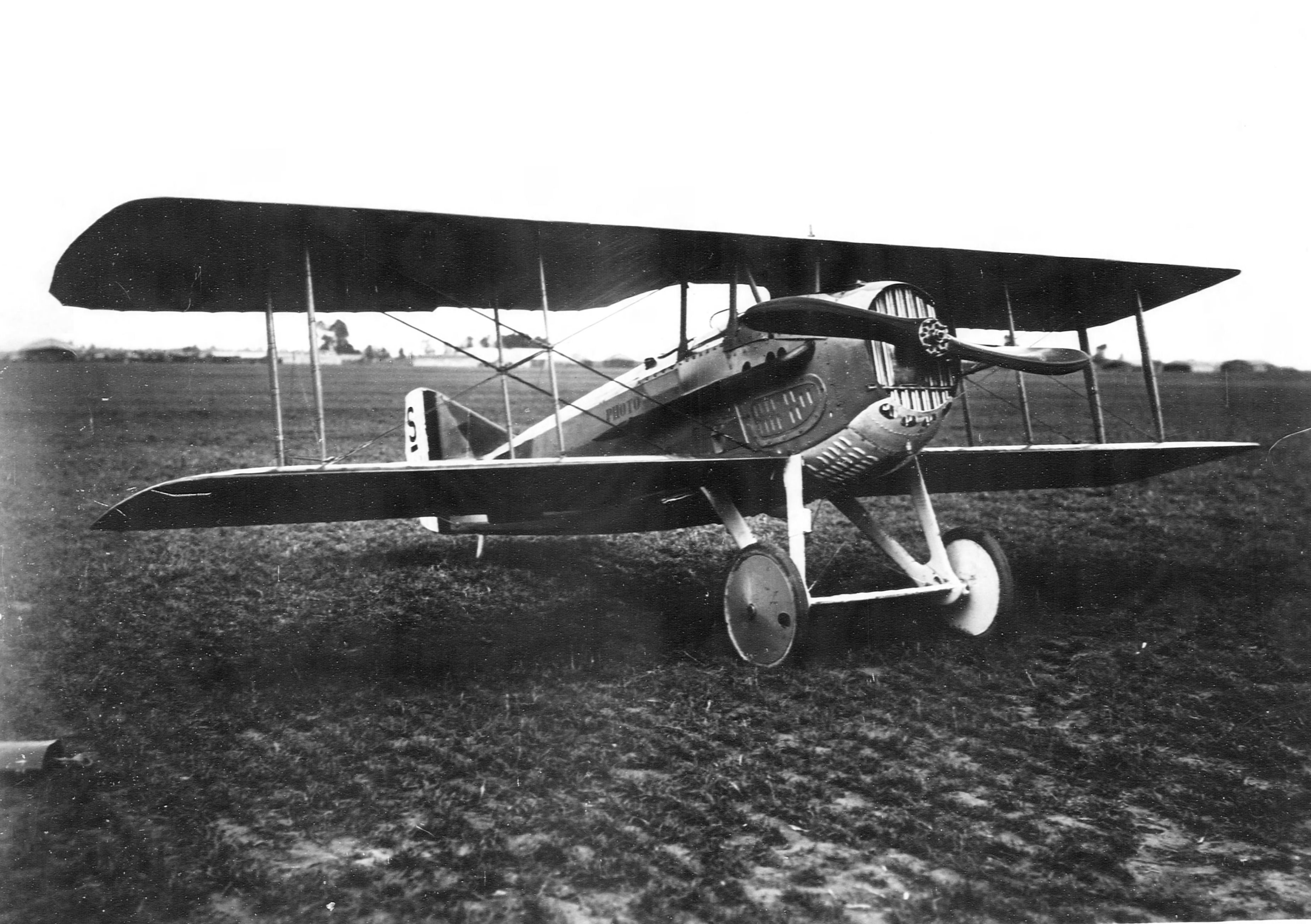
Gilbert de Guingand died in 1918 while taking off with a SPAD S.XIII.

Gilbert Marie de Guingand did not survive the war, as he died in a takeoff accident on 22 October 1918 in Revigny, less than three weeks before the armistice.

== List of aerial victories ==
See also Aerial victory standards of World War I

Confirmed victories are numbered chronologically; unconfirmed victories are denoted "u/c".

No.	Date/time	Opponent	Result	Location	Notes
u/c	4 May 1917	Albatros			
u/c	23 May 1917	Albatros			
1	26 June 1917; 2015 hours	Albatros fighter	Destroyed	Berry-au-Bac, France	Victory shared with another pilot
2	18 August 1917	Albatros	Destroyed	Foret d'Houthulst, Belgium	Victory shared with Armand de Turenne
3	26 August 1917	Albatros	Destroyed	North of Diksmuide, Belgium	Victory shared with René Montrion
u/c	24 October 1917	German two-seater			
4	15 December 1917	German two-seater	Destroyed	Prosnes, France	Victory shared with Robert Delannoy, and two other pilots
u/c	29 December 1917	German two-seater		Sault Saint Remy-Roizy	
5	21 March 1918; 1808 hours	Albatros	Destroyed	Mont Cornilette	Victory shared with Andre Barcat
6	31 May 1918	Fokker Triplane	Destroyed	South of Soissons, France	
7	6 June 1918	German observation balloon	Destroyed	Catigny, France	Victory shared with Andre Montrion
8	7 June 1918	German observation balloon	Destroyed	Vézaponin, France	Victory shared with another pilot
u/c	11 June 1918	German two-seater		La Neuville-sur-Ressons, France	
u/c	21 July 1918	German aircraft			
u/c	22 July 1918	Fokker			

== Artistic work ==
Besides his military career, Gilbert de Guingand created significant artworks. He was a painter-decorator before doing his military service from 1912. He painted and drew all along his life. This passion has probably to deal with his parents' job who were both painters.

Gilbert de Guingand's artworks are particularly interesting to illustrate the First World War. He gathered them in series he called War's Watercolours (Aquarelles de guerre) and War's Drawings (Dessins de guerre). Most of them are curated in the library La Contemporaine in France.

== Aquarelles de guerre and Dessins de guerre ==
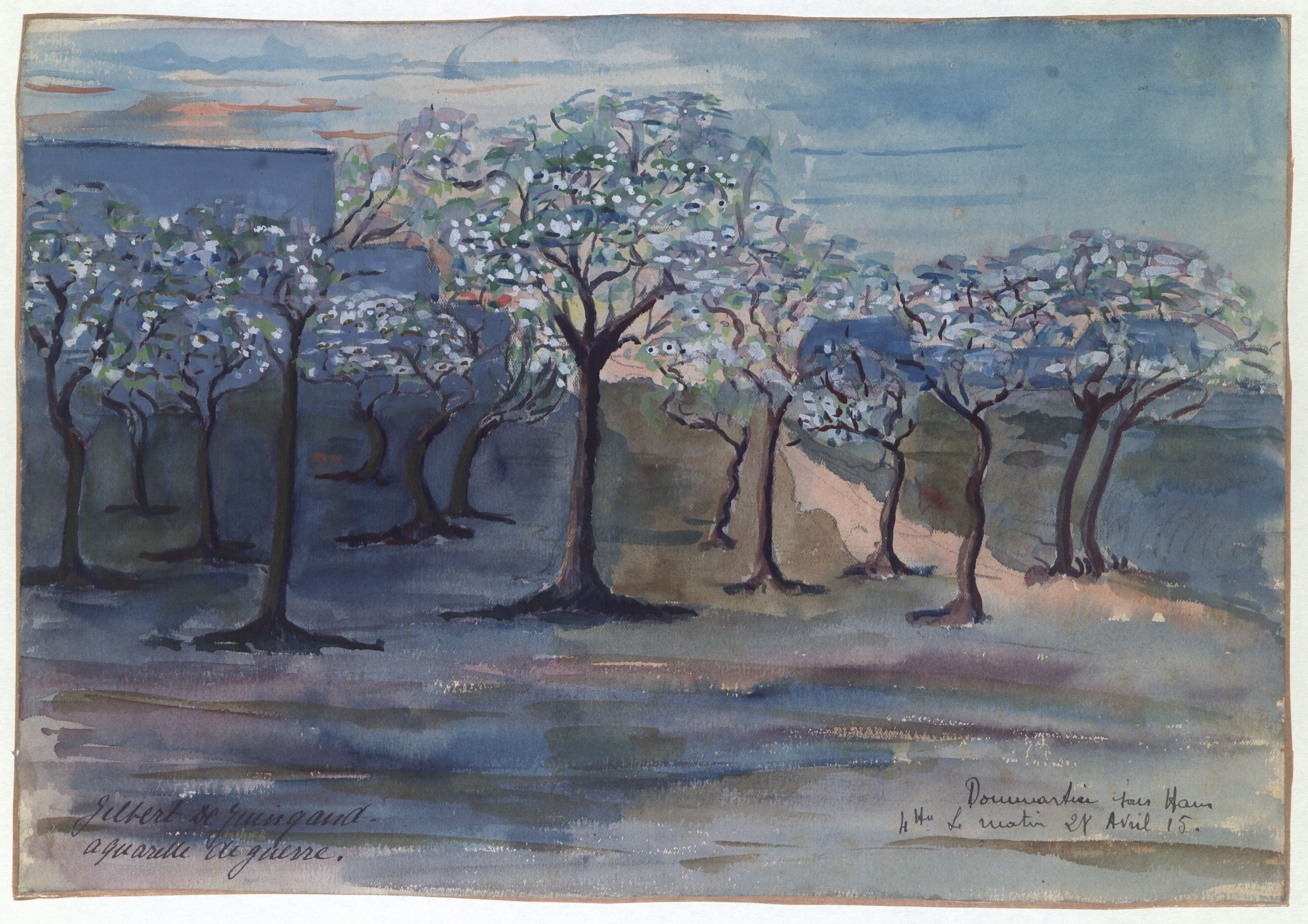
Dommartin-sous-Hans, 4h le matin, 28 avril 1915, Gilbert de Guingand, watercolour, La Contemporaine

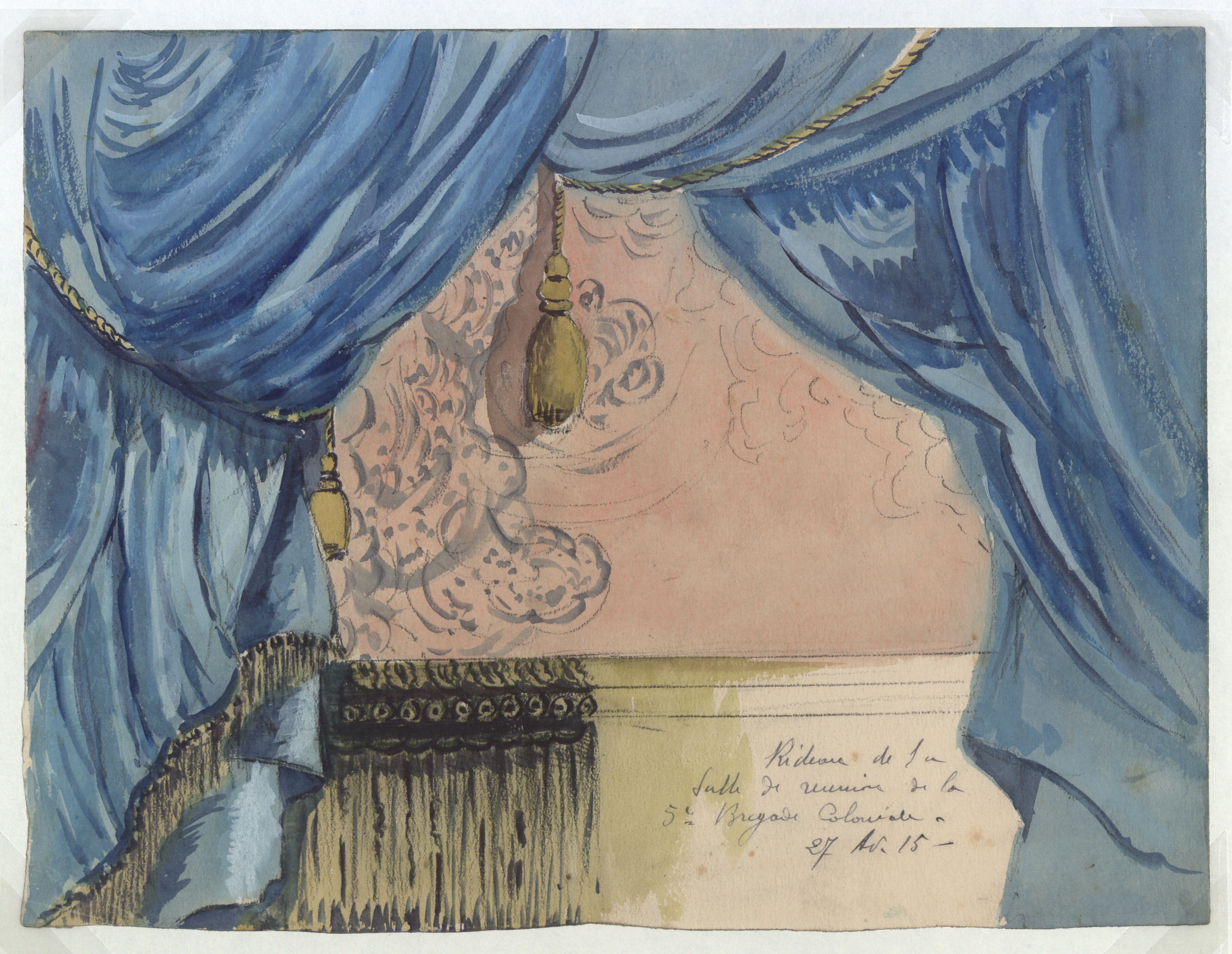
Rideau de la salle de réunion de la 5e brigade coloniale, 27 avril 1915, Gilbert de Guingand, watercolour, La Contemporaine

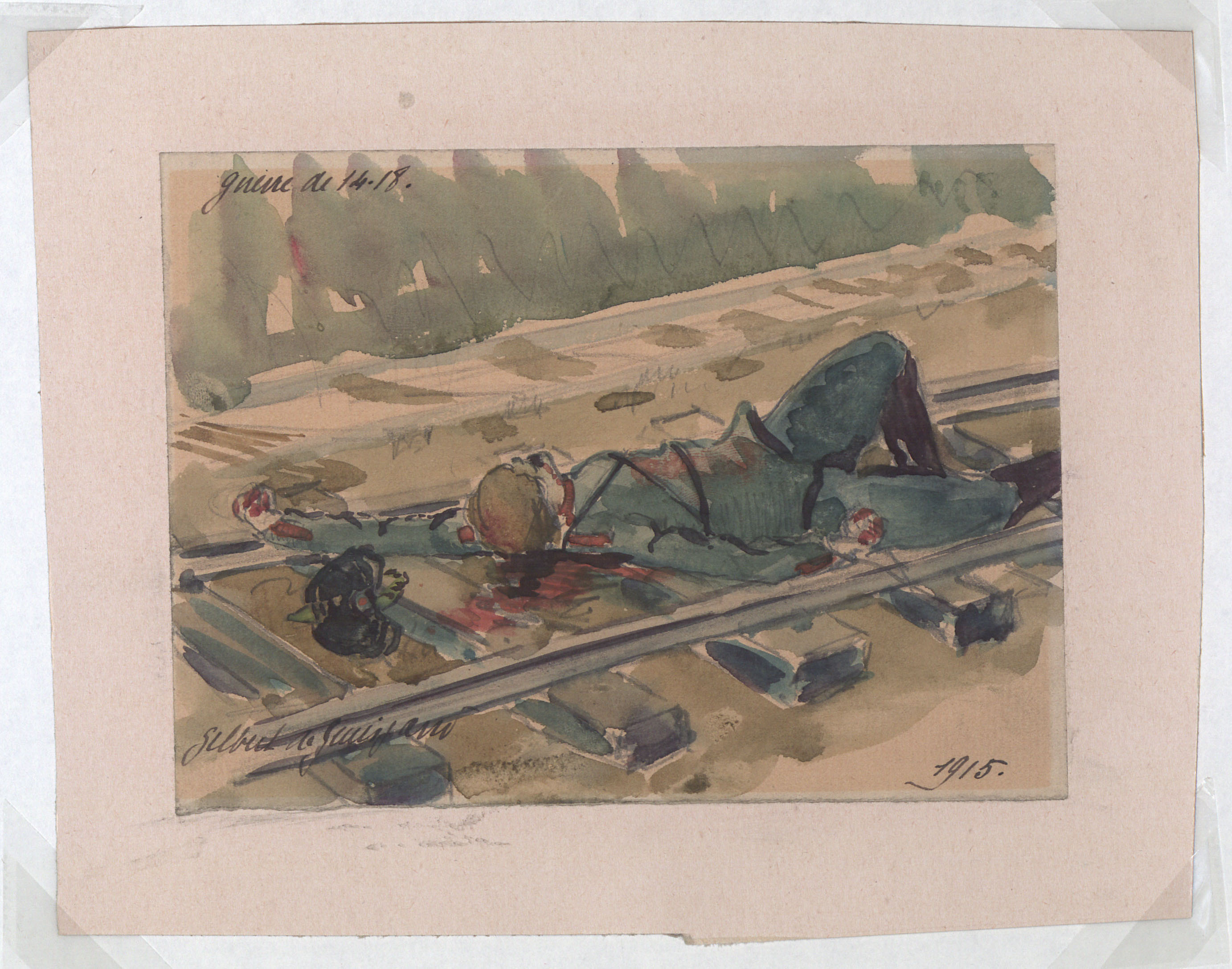
Soldat allemand mort, étendu sur une voie ferrée, Gilbert de Guingand, watercolour, La Contemporaine

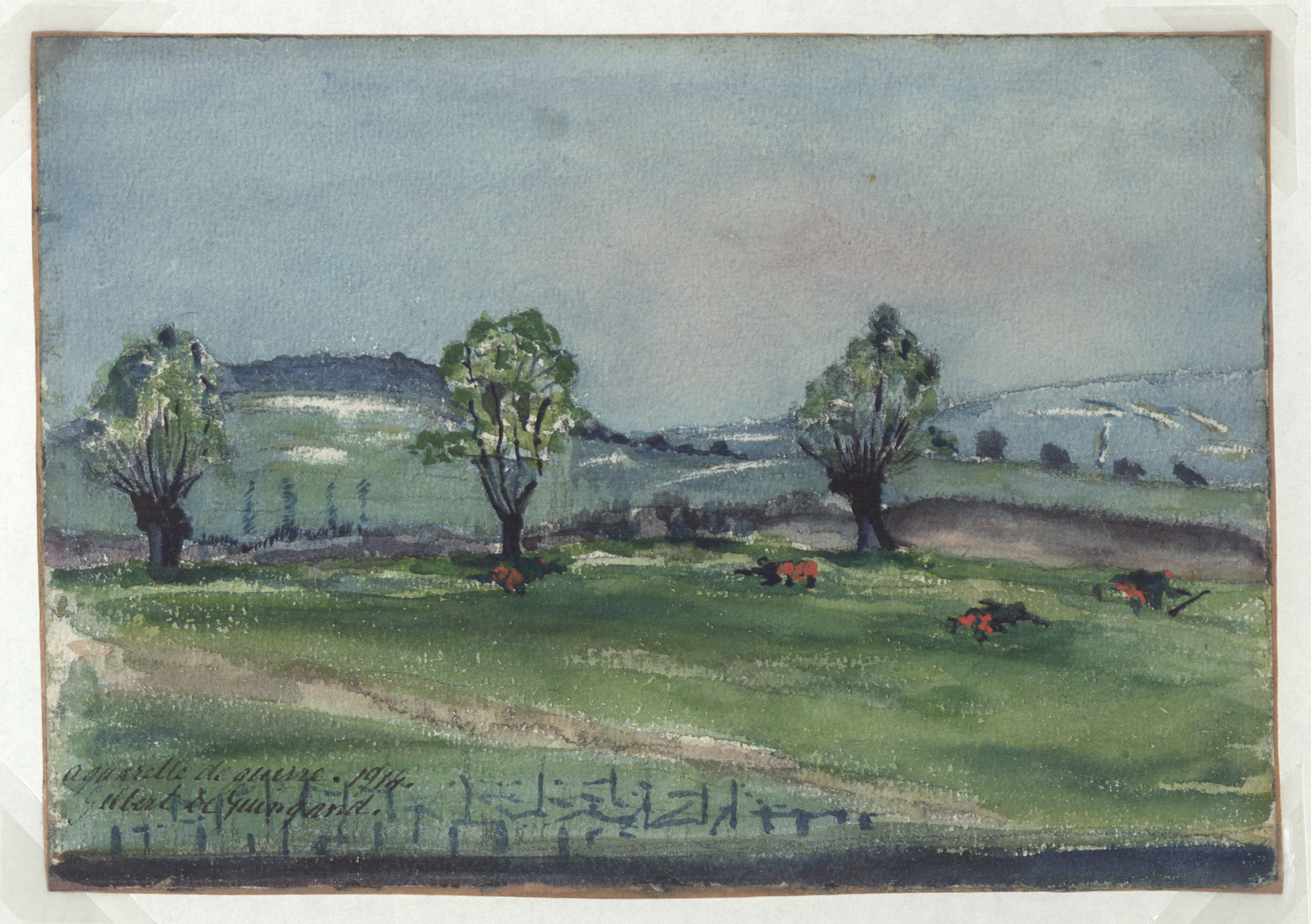
Soldats morts dans un pré, Gilbert de Guingand, watercolour, La Contemporaine

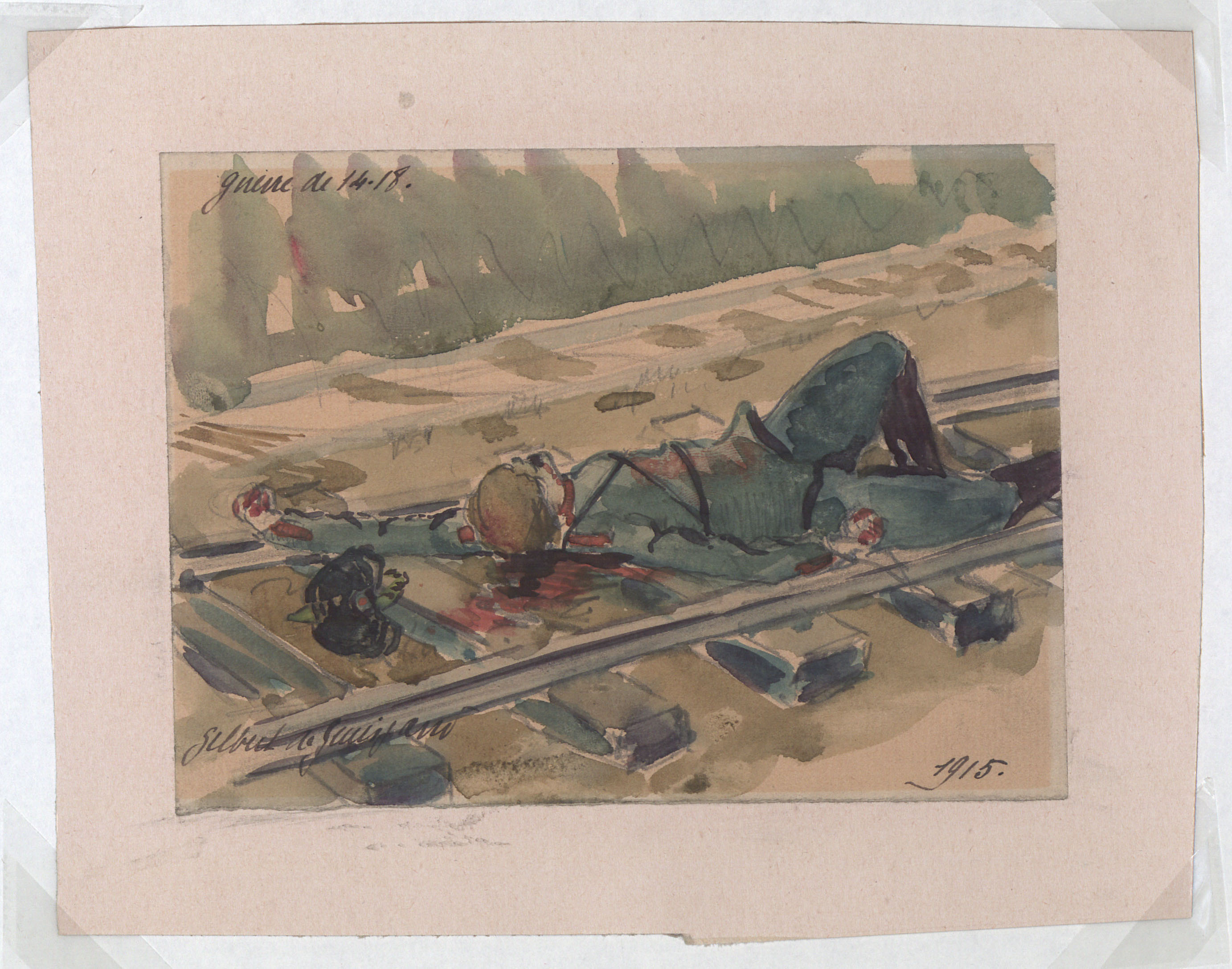
Soldat allemand mort, étendu sur une voie ferrée, Gilbert de Guingand, watercolour, La Contemporaine

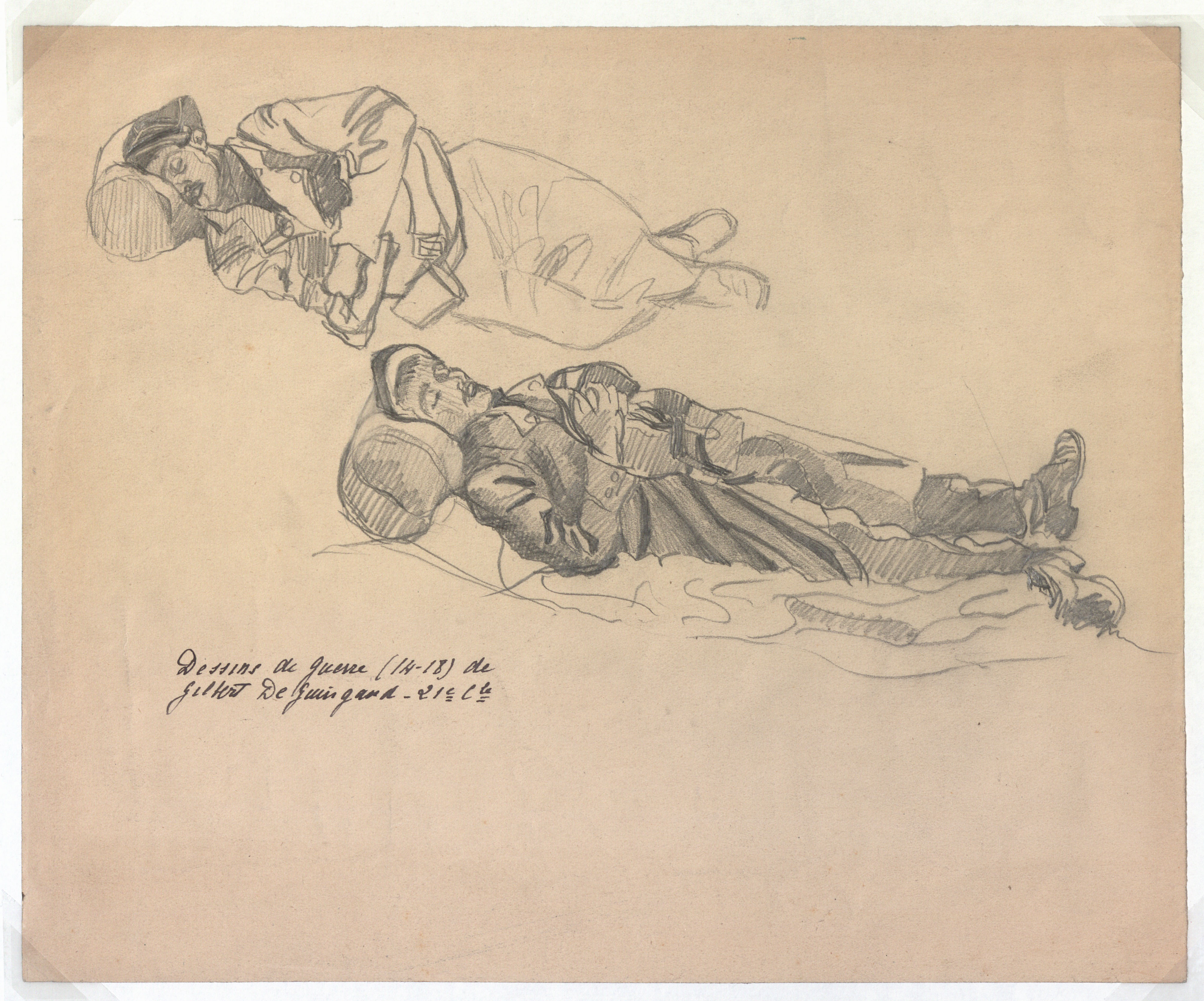
Deux soldats dormant, Gilbert de Guingand, graphite on paper, La Contemporaine
