= Jean-Marie de Premonville =

Member of the Resistance in France during World War II, he was sentenced to death, but just deported.

French war correspondent, Jean-Marie de Prémonville de Maisonthou covered the Korean War for the Agence France-Presse before being killed by machinegun fire while riding with a patrol on 12 February 1951 during the battle of Chipyong-ni.

He had initially been sent to replace AFP correspondent Maximilien Philomenko who had been killed earlier.

He co-authored the book Return to Korea: Tales of Four War Correspondents on the Korean Front, published by Rene Juilliard in 1951, along with Serge Bromberger, Philippe Baudy and Henri de Turenne (writer).
