= René Dousinelle =

René Paul Louis Dousinelle
- Born: 2 June 1891; Maisons-Laffitte, Yvelines, France
- Died: 28 January 1963 (aged 71); Maisons-Laffitte, Yvelines, France
- Burial place: Municipal cemetery, Maisons-Laffitte; 48°57′N 2°08′E
- Military career
- Allegiance: France
- Branch: French Army
- Rank: Sous lieutenant
- Units: 155e Regiment d'Infanterie; Escadrille 311; Escadrille 48
- Awards: Légion d'honneur Médaille militaire Croix de Guerre with 10 palms Croix de guerre (Belgium), 3 × Mentioned in Dispatches

Sous lieutenant René Paul Louis Dousinelle was a French World War I flying ace credited with nine confirmed and three unconfirmed aerial victories.

== Early life and infantry service ==
René Paul Louis Dousinelle was born in Maisons-Laffitte on 2 June 1891. He began military service as an infantryman in the 155e Regiment d'Infanterie on 9 October 1912. He was mentioned in dispatches while serving as a soldier.

== Aerial service ==
He received Military Pilot's Brevet No. 4349 on 27 August 1916. He then went on to advanced training at Pau and Cazaux. On 6 April 1917, he was assigned to Escadrille 311, only to be transferred a week later to Escadrille 48. He reported to his new unit as a sergeant pilot. He scored his maiden victory on 21 September 1917, sharing a win over a German two-seater reconnaissance aircraft with Sergent René Montrion. The next day, he shared another victory, teaming with adjutant Georges Blanc to take down an Albatros two-seater. On 7 October, he helped another pilot destroy a German fighter aircraft. Two days later, he was promoted to adjutant.

On 31 May 1918, he was commissioned as a temporary sous-lieutenant. Dousinelle then shot down another German reconnaissance aircraft on 5 June, followed by double victories on both the 11th and the 28th. His ninth victory, on 22 July 1918, preceded his receipt of the Légion d'honneur five days later. Previously, he had won the Médaille militaire and both French and Belgian Croix de guerres. His Légion d'honneur citation referred to one of his double victories, probably that of 11 June: "Recently, accompanied by two young pilots, he did not hesitate to attack an enemy patrol of eleven scouts and downed two in our lines."

In October 1918, Dousinelle was relieved of combat duty and sent for a rest.

== Later life ==
René Dousinelle died on 28 January 1963.
