= Albert Achard =

French World War I flying ace (1894–1972)

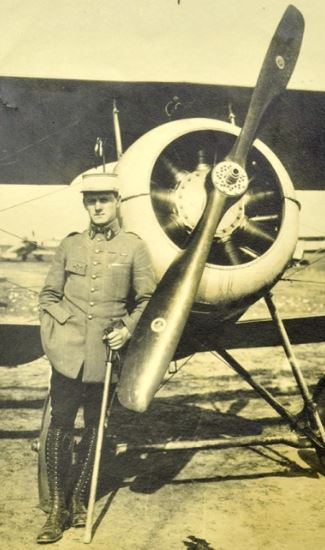
- Albert Achard and his aircraft during World War I
- Born: 26 March 1894; Briançon, Hautes-Alpes, France
- Died: 21 August 1972 (aged 78); Albi, Tarn, France
- Military career
- Allegiance: France
- Branch: French Army; French Air Force
- Service years: 1913–1924; 1939–1940
- Rank: Captain
- Units: 9th Hussar Regiment; Escadrille MS.48; Escadrille 91S; Escadrille MF.98T; Escadrille F.203; Détachement N.510; Escadrille N.85; Escadrille N.78/SPA.78
- Commands: Escadrille SPA.150
- Conflicts: World War I • Western Front • Macedonian front World War II • Battle of France
- Awards: Croix de Guerre (with 6 palms); Legion d'Honneur

Albert Achard (26 March 1894 – 21 August 1972) was a French flying ace of the First World War, credited with five aerial victories, one as an observer and four as a pilot. (Note: Some sources credit him with six.) He served as a reserve air force officer in the 1920s and 1930s, and returned to active duty in World War II.

== Family background ==
Achard was born in Briançon in the department of Hautes-Alpes, the son of Gabriel Denis Achard and his wife Florentine Hête-Thievoz. At the time of his birth his father was a sous-lieutenant in the 159th Infantry Regiment, but later he became a merchant.

== World War I ==
Achard enlisted into the French Army on 7 August 1913. After passing the entrance examination he entered the military academy at Saint-Cyr as an officer cadet on 6 September, and was commissioned as a sous-lieutenant on 6 November. On 12 August 1914, soon after the outbreak of the war, he was posted to the 9th Hussar Regiment, which was engaged in the Battle of the Frontiers and the subsequent Race to the Sea in late 1914. On 17 March 1915 Achard was transferred to Army's aviation branch – the Aéronautique Militaire – training at Le Bourget to become an observer.

On 3 April 1915 he was posted to the newly created escadrille MS.48, based at Villacoublay. The escadrille initially comprised only six pilots and two observers, flying the Morane-Saulnier L. (Note: All the aircraft in an escadrille where of the same type, and the prefix identified the manufacturer: MS = Morane-Saulnier, N = Nieuport, F = Farman, MF = Maurice Farman, and SPA = SPAD, etc.) At this stage of the war not all French aircraft had machine guns, and Achard had only a carbine rifle to return fire.

On 15 April, with pilot Maréchal-des-logis Louis Chatain, Achard gained MS.48's first success shooting at a German aircraft with his carbine, and damaging its wing sufficiently to force it to land. On 22 April MS.48 moved to Lunéville, and two days later, after a reconnaissance, Achard reported vital information, even though his aircraft was badly damaged by shrapnel. On 28 April he was credited with his first aerial victory, shooting down an enemy aircraft. On 1 July 1915 his aircraft attacked a German Albatros. Achard's aircraft approached to within 50 metres (160 ft), but was hit by enemy fire, narrowly missing the pilot and cutting a cabane. In spite of the danger to the aircraft, they continued to attack and pursued the enemy well beyond the French lines until it was seen to suddenly dive. Achard was promoted to lieutenant on 8 July 1915. On 31 July, two MS.48 aircraft were flying escort to a Voisin III on a bombing mission to Dambach. One aircraft, piloted by Brigadier Edouard Thieffries de Layens, with Achard as observer, was engaged in a dogfight and succeeded in putting their opponent to flight. Achard was then transferred to the Macedonian front, serving as an observer in escadrille 91S from 12 October 1915. On 1 February 1916 he was cited (citation dans les ordres) for his numerous and accurate reconnaissance reports, having flown 350 kilometres (220 mi) in total, 175 kilometres (109 mi) of which were over the enemy lines.

On 29 February 1916 he was transferred to the military flying school in Thessaloniki to train as a pilot, being awarded pilot certificate No. 4642 on 20 April. He remained in Greece, serving as a pilot in escadrille MF.98T until 25 July, then escadrille F.203 between 24 October and 1 January 1917.

Achard was then posted back to France, attached to the Réserve Générale de l'Aviation (RGA) from 1 January to 9 March 1917. He then served in détachement de protection N.510, a unit attached to escadrille F.44, from 9 March to 1 July where he gained his second aerial victory on 2 May by shooting down an enemy aircraft over Thaon-les-Vosges. His opponents were probably Vizefeldwebel Seifert and Unteroffizier Wilhelm Niess of SchuSta 7 who were both taken prisoner. He served in escadrille N.85 from 1 July 1917, gaining his third victory on 27 June, then transferred to escadrille N.78/SPA.78 on 12 September. The next day, 13 September, he was made a Chevalier of the Légion d'honneur. His citation describes him as an "excellent fighter pilot of tireless ardor, who never ceases to display the finest qualities of audacity and intrepidity" and noted that on 27 June, after a difficult fight, he shot down his second enemy aircraft. Achard was wounded in action, and was evacuated to the Clermont Hospital between 2 May and 7 June 1918, then returned to his unit, and gained his fourth and fifth aerial victories on 19 and 24 July. On 2 August 1918 a citation described him as a "pilot officer of unusual skill and energy" and noted that on 19 July, he reported his fourth victory by shooting down an enemy fighter aircraft that crashed into the French lines. On 26 August 1918 Achard was appointed commander of escadrille SPA.150, and on 18 October he was once again cited for shooting down in flames an enemy triplane. He was also attacked by a patrol of enemy monoplanes, probably shot down one, and although wounded and having his aircraft seriously damaged, managed to regain the French lines. He received a temporary promotion to captain on 27 October, and remained with SPA.150 until 2 April 1919.

== Inter-war career ==
After the war Achard served in the 4ème régiment d'aviation at Le Bourget from 1 January 1920, then in the 5ème régiment d'aviation d'observation from 1 June. He later served in the 35ème régiment d'aviation, but then spent three years on leave without pay before eventually relinquishing his commission, but remained a reserve officer serving as a lieutenant in the 36ème groupe d'aviation from 5 November 1924. He was promoted to reserve captain on 12 July 1926, and was posted to base aérienne 119 at Pau on 1 December 1936, then to bataillon de l'air 113 on 1 February 1938. Achard completed exercises at the centre de renseignements et d'alerte ("information and alert centre") at Carcassonne between 25 September and 5 October 1938, and served at base aérienne 721 at Rochefort from 21 October to 3 November 1938. He was posted to bataillon de l'air 109 on 1 November 1938.

== World War II ==
On the outbreak of World War II Achard was mobilized for active service and returned to the centre de renseignements et d'alerte at Carcassonne on 2 September 1939. He served at base aérienne 109 at Tours from 8 November 1939, and was posted to the staff of the 2ème subdivision aérienne at Bordeaux on 9 January 1940.

Achard died in Albi on 21 August 1972.

== Memorials ==
A road is named after him in the commune of Biol, Isère, and he is also commemorated as an ace on a memorial plaque at the Musée de l'air et de l'espace at Le Bourget, located in the hall of the old air terminal.
