= Maurice Rousselle =

French World War I flying ace

Maurice Albert Rousselle
- Born: 6 November 1895; Le Pré-Saint-Gervais, France
- Died: 9 January 1926 (aged 30); Paris, France
- Military career
- Allegiance: France
- Branch: Aviation
- Rank: Adjutant
- Unit: Escadrille Spa.81
- Awards: Médaille militaire Croix de Guerre

Adjutant Maurice Albert Rousselle (1895–1926) was a French World War I flying ace credited with five aerial victories.

== Biography ==
Rousselle was born in Le Pré-Saint-Gervais, France on 6 November 1895.

Rouselle began his military service in the early days of the First World War, on 19 December 1914. He was awarded his Military Pilot's Brevet on 21 December 1915. Posted to Escadrille N.81 on 8 December 1917, he would go on to shoot down four German observation balloons and an airplane during 1918. His valor was rewarded with the Médaille Militaire and the Croix de guerre 1914-1918 (France) with five palms.

Rousselle died in Paris on 9 January 1926.
