= André Herbelin =

French flying ace

André René Celestin Herbelin
- Born: 9 December 1889; Le Havre, France
- Died: 16 December 1966 (aged 77); Courbevoie, France
- Military career
- Allegiance: France
- Branch: Army
- Rank: Lieutenant colonel
- Units: 8e Regiment du train des equipages Escadrille Spa.102; Escadrille Spa.81; Escadrille Spa.97
- Awards: Légion d'honneur Médaille militaire Croix de Guerre with seven Palmes
- Other work: Fought as part of the French Resistance during World War II

Lieutenant Colonel André René Celestin Herbelin was a French flying ace during World War I. He was credited with eleven confirmed aerial victories. He returned to his country's defense again during World War II, becoming part of the French Resistance against the Nazis.

== Early life ==
André René Celestin Herbelin was born in Le Havre on 9 December 1889.

== Military career ==
Herbelin was a non-commissioned officer in the French infantry's inactive reserves when World War I began. On 19 August 1914, he was called to the colors again and assigned to the 8e Regiment du Train des Equipages as a Sergeant. He transferred to aviation service on 28 January 1916 for pilot's training at Avord. On 29 March 1916, he was granted Pilot's Brevet No. 3088. He then underwent advanced training at Pau and Cazaux before reporting for assignment on 20 August 1916. On 4 September, he was forwarded to Escadrille 102.

Herbelin flew a Nieuport to score his first victory on 25 January 1917, and followed it up with two more, on 16 and 19 March. A promotion to Adjutant came on 25 March 1917. On 8 April, he transferred to Escadrille 81, which also operated Nieuports. On 20 April, he was awarded the Médaille militaire to accompany his Croix de guerre. He resumed scoring in August, downing three more German planes, including one shared with Gabriel Guérin and Marcel A. Hugues. Two claims for September wins went unverified. Then, on 11 October, he was hospitalized for a brief stay. While recuperating, he was commissioned as a Sous lieutenant. On the 25th, he returned to his squadron. In December, he teamed with Hugues, Adrien L. J. Leps, and Adjutant Levecque for two more wins.

Herbelin's ninth triumph came on 30 January 1918, his tenth on 5 March. A month later, on 6 April 1918, he was appointed a Chevalier in the Légion d'honneur. He transferred to Escadrille 97 on 22 May 1918 to fly Spads. On 15 July, he tallied his final victory. By the end of the war, he had eleven confirmed victories to show for over 1,400 combat hours flown.

== Later life ==
The 1920 listing of French civil aircraft shows Herbelin operating two Spad VII, registry codes F-ABEI and F-ABEJ, so he apparently continued to fly after the war.

During World War II, Herbelin joined the French Resistance against the Nazis occupying France. This brought him the honor of being raised to Commandeur in the Légion d'honneur at the rank of lieutenant colonel. After the war, he served as secretary of the French Aces Association before his death on 16 December 1966.
