= Edmond Caillaux =

French World War 1 Pilot

Edmond Eugene Henri Caillaux
- Born: 18 February 1896; Vendôme
- Died: 22 January 1943 (aged 46)
- Military career
- Allegiance: France
- Branch: Service corps; artillery; aviation
- Rank: Adjutant
- Unit: Escadrille SPA.48
- Conflicts: World War I (Eastern and Western Fronts)
- Awards: Legion d'honneur Médaille Militaire; Croix de Guerre

Edmond Eugene Henri Caillaux (18 February 1896 — 22 January 1943) was a French World War I flying ace credited with five confirmed and three unconfirmed aerial victories.

== Biography ==
Caillaux was born on 18 February 1896 in Vendôme, France. On 11 March 1915, he volunteered to serve in the military for the war's duration. After serving as a driver and an artilleryman, he transferred to an aviation unit on the Eastern Front. He entered the aviation service on 29 February 1916, trained as a pilot, and received Military Pilot's Brevet No. 4646 on 22 May 1916. He was then returned to the Eastern Front as a pilot. On 1 January 1917, he was transferred to the Western Front; on 28 April 1917, he was posted to Escadrille SPA.48. After three unconfirmed victories, he was credited with downing an Aviatik on 3 December 1917. He would continue to score until 17 June 1918, ending with five confirmed victories.

Caillaux died on 22 January 1943 in Montigny-les-Cormeilles, France.

== Honors and awards ==
- Legion d'honneur awarded 24 December 1925
- Médaille Militaire awarded 27 July 1918
- Croix de Guerre
