= Lucien J. Jailler =

Lucien Joseph Jailler
- Born: 23 November 1889; Le Coteau, France
- Died: June 2, 1921 (aged 31); Saint-Leger-sur-Loire, France
- Military career
- Allegiance: France
- Branch: Aviation
- Service years: 1909 – ca 1918
- Rank: Sous lieutenant
- Unit: Escadrille 15
- Awards: Légion d'honneur, Médaille militaire, Croix de Guerre

Lucien Joseph Jailler (1889-1921) was a French World War I flying ace credited with twelve confirmed and eight unverified aerial victories.

== Early life ==
Lucien Joseph Jailler was born on 23 November 1889 in Le Coteau, France. He joined the French army in 1909. He learned to fly on his own in 1911, receiving a civil pilot's license on 10 November 1911.

On 8 October 1912, he transferred to the 3e Groupe d'Aeronautique of the Aéronautique Militaire; the next year, he was permitted as a pilot with Military Pilot's Brevet No. 349. Despite this, Jailler began World War I assigned as a tractor driver for an escadrille at Épinal.

== Aerial service ==
Jailler was promoted to Caporal on 23 March 1915. Shortly thereafter, he was finally assigned a flying slot on 1 April 1915, when he was assigned to Escadrille 15. He then was promoted to Sergent ten days after joining his new unit. On 16 May 1915, he was seriously wounded in combat. Five days later, he was awarded the Médaille militaire.

It was 8 March 1916 before he scored his first win. He then added erratically to his score until 12 June 1917, when he scored his twelfth. During July 1916, after Jailler shot down a German observation balloon for his fourth win, he was promoted to Adjutant. On 8 July, he was also appointed a Chevalier de la Légion d'honneur. He would score twice more that year, to end the year an ace.

Jailler was commissioned a sous lieutenant on 22 August 1917. On 23 November 1917, he was pulled from combat for a rest, after 232 flying hours and 27 dogfights, and became an instructor.

== Post World War I ==
Lucien Joseph Jailler died in Saint-Leger-sur-Loire, France on 2 June 1921 after a brief sickness.
