= Armond J. Berthelot =

French flying ace

Armond/Armand Jean Berthelot
- Born: July 11, 1894; Saint Marc
- Died: September 19, 1961 (aged 67)
- Military career
- Allegiance: France
- Branch: Cavalry; aviation
- Service years: 1912–
- Rank: Adjutant
- Unit: Escadrille 15
- Conflicts: World War I
- Awards: Légion d'honneur, Médaille militaire, Croix de Guerre

Adjutant Armond/Armand Jean Berthelot (English: /bɛərtəˈloʊ/, French: [bɛʁtəlo]; 1894–1961) was a French World War I flying ace credited with eleven confirmed aerial victories. He was a scourge to enemy aerial observers, as his victory record contained six observation aircraft and two observation balloons.

== Early life ==
Armond Jean Berthelot was born in Saint-Marc on 11 July 1894.

== Military service ==
On 8 October 1912, Berthelot enlisted in the French military for three years. He first served in the 3eme Dragons. He was promoted to enlisted Brigadier on 3 August 1913, and once more, to Maréchal-des-logis on 2 April 1915. On 5 November 1916, he entered pilot training; he earned Pilot's Brevet No. 5703, which was awarded him on 18 March 1917. He was also awarded metallic pilot badge number B 12324. His first aerial assignment, on 22 May 1917, was to Escadrille 365 in defense of Paris. Two months later, on 27 July, Berthelot was reassigned to Escadrille N15 ('N' denoting the unit's use of Nieuports).

On 24 March 1918, he destroyed a German observation balloon. On 12 April, he was again a balloon buster, ruining one over Mézières. Upgraded to a Spad, he started downing enemy observation planes: three in May, including a shared win with Bernard Artigau; another on 6 June. Exactly a month later, he was awarded the Médaille Militaire; a prerequisite of the award was the Croix de Guerre, which he held with ten palmes and an etoile de bronze. On 14 August, he picked up his winning skein, shooting down a Rumpler observation plane. Berthelot scored twice in September, then doubled on 9 October to finish the war with eleven victories.

On 25 April 1919, Armand Jean Berthelot was appointed a Chevalier in the Légion d'honneur.

== Honors and awards ==
"Remarkable pursuit pilot with high moral values and exceptional skill, a model of bravery and spirit. He recently downed his 6th enemy plane. Four citations." Médaille Militaire citation, 7 July 1918

"Pursuit pilot beyond compare, has reported 11 official victories. Médaille Militaire for feats of war. Ten citations." Chevalier de la Légion d'Honneur citation, 25 April 1919
