= Fort Saganne =

1984 film

- Theatrical release poster
- Directed by: Alain Corneau
- Screenplay by: Alain Corneau; Louis Gardel; Henri de Turenne
- Based on: Fort Saganne by Louis Gardel
- Produced by: Albina du Boisrouvray
- Starring: Gérard Depardieu; Catherine Deneuve; Philippe Noiret; Sophie Marceau
- Cinematography: Bruno Nuytten
- Edited by: Thierry Derocles; Robert Lawrence
- Music by: Philippe Sarde
- Production companies: Albina Productions; Films A2; Société Française de Production
- Distributed by: Acteurs Auteurs Associés
- Release date: 11 May 1984 (France)
- Running time: 180 minutes
- Country: France
- Language: French
- Budget: $6 million(est)
- Box office: $13 million

Fort Saganne is a 1984 French war film directed by Alain Corneau and starring Gérard Depardieu, Philippe Noiret, Catherine Deneuve, and Sophie Marceau. Based on the 1980 novel of the same name by Louis Gardel, the film is about a soldier of humble beginnings who volunteers for service in the Sahara in 1911. After falling in love with the beautiful young daughter of the regional administrator, he is ordered to go on missions in the desert, where he engages in several successful campaigns and experiences severe loneliness. Later, while on a diplomatic mission to Paris, he has a brief affair with a journalist. Returning to Africa, he leads a gallant defense against a feared sultan and is awarded the Legion of Honour medal. He returns to his home a national hero and marries the young girl he has not forgotten, but their happiness is interrupted by the onset of World War I.

Fort Saganne was screened out of competition at the 1984 Cannes Film Festival. At the time of its production, Fort Saganne was France's biggest-budget film. The film earned 2,157,767 admissions in France. In 1985, the film was nominated for four César Awards, for Best Actor (Gérard Depardieu), Best Cinematography (Bruno Nuytten), Best Costume Design (Corinne Jorry, Rosine Delamare), and Best Sound.

== Plot ==
In 1911, a willful and determined man from peasant stock named Charles Saganne (Gérard Depardieu) enlists in the military and is assigned to the Sahara Desert under the aristocratic Colonel Dubreuilh (Philippe Noiret). Saganne attracts the attentions of Madeleine (Sophie Marceau), the daughter of the regional administrator. In the Sahara, Saganne earns the respect of the Arabs, including Amajan, an independent warrior. After several campaigns, Saganne travels to Paris on a diplomatic mission. After having an affair with a journalist in Paris, Saganne returns to Africa, where he leads a valliant defense against Sultan Omar. He is awarded the medal of the Legion of Honour, and marries Madeleine. The onset of World War I puts his success and happiness at risk.

== Cast ==
- Gérard Depardieu as Charles Saganne
- Philippe Noiret as Dubreuilh
- Catherine Deneuve as Louise
- Sophie Marceau as Madeleine of Saint-Ilette
- Michel Duchaussoy as Baculard
- Roger Dumas as Vulpi
- Jean-Louis Richard as Flammarin
- Jean-Laurent Cochet as Bertozza
- Pierre Tornade as Charles' Father
- Saïd Amadis as Amajar
- René Clermont as Monsieur de Saint-Ilette
- Hippolyte Girardot as Courette
- Sophie Grimaldi as Lady of Saint-Ilette
- Florent Pagny as Lucien Saganne, Charles’ brother

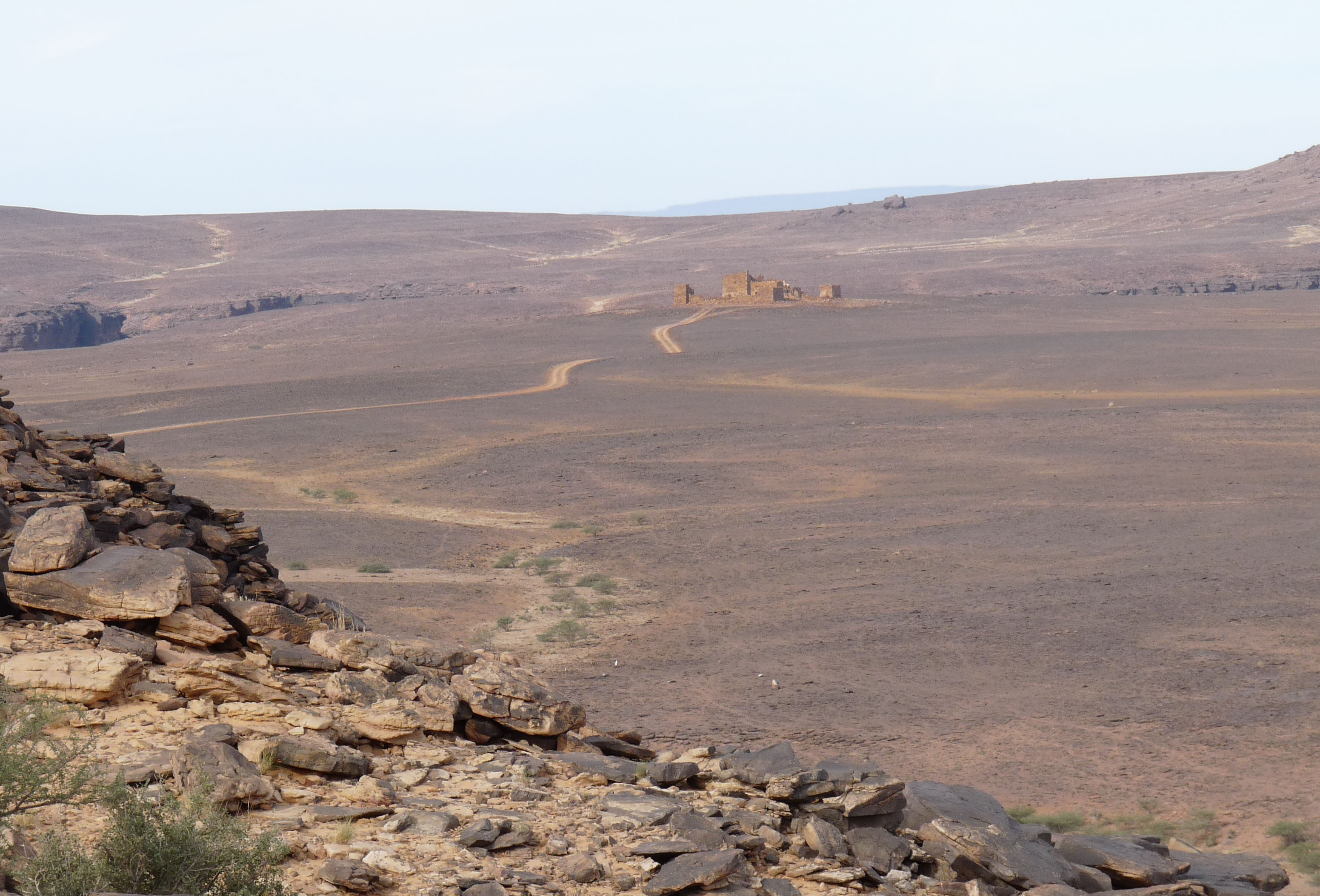
Fort Saganne near the Amojjar Pass

== Production ==
Fort Saganne was filmed on location at Abbaye du Moncel, Pontpoint, Oise, France, and Mauritania where the eponymous fort was built near the Amojjar Pass close to Atar.

== Reception ==
=== Box office ===
At the time of its production, Fort Saganne was France's biggest-budget film. The film earned 2,157,767 admissions in France.

=== Critical response ===
At the time of its theatrical release, the film received mixed reviews. In Variety magazine, the reviewer observed that the film "is often fine in its large-scale reconstruction of a time and place and a mentality, but falters in its attempts to inscribe well-detailed characters in its wide-screen canvas." The reviewer also found the romantic relationships depicted in the film to be underdeveloped.

Film is weakest in describing Depardieu's romantic relationships. His brief but intense affair with special guest star Catherine Deneuve, as a journalist who maneuvers him into bed provocatively, lacks fire and poignancy. And young Sophie Marceau gets insufficient screen time to make any impression as the young bourgeois girl who pines for Depardieu and later becomes his wife, then widow.

In her review in Allmovie, Eleanor Mannikka gave the film three out of five stars, noting that the "sweep of this epic skims over the qualities that transformed Saganne from an ordinary officer to a great military leader." Mannikka concluded:

Even though the costuming, landscape, battles, and charisma of Depardieu as Saganne and Noiret as Colonel Dubreuilh are outstanding, and several subsidiary characters deliver emotionally compelling vignettes, the protagonists as an ensemble have not been scripted with much depth of character—making the three-hour epic seem a bit too long in the end.

=== Awards and nominations ===
- 1985 César Award Nomination for Best Actor (Gérard Depardieu)
- 1985 César Award Nomination for Best Cinematography (Bruno Nuytten)
- 1985 César Award Nomination for Best Costume Design (Corinne Jorry, Rosine Delamare)
- 1985 César Award Nomination for Best Sound (Jean-Paul Loublier, Claude Villand, Pierre Gamet).
