= Jacques Roques =

WW1 French flying ace

Jacques Raphaël Roques
- Born: 2 August 1897; Paris, France
- Died: 24 May 1988 (aged 90); Paris, France
- Military career
- Allegiance: France
- Branch: French Army; French Air Force
- Service years: 1915–1919, 1939–1940
- Rank: Captain
- Units: 2ème régiment étranger 1er régiment aviation Escadrille N.48/SPA.48; Groupe de Chasse I/1
- Awards: Légion d'honneur Médaille militaire Croix de guerre Croix du combattant volontaire Croix de guerre (Belgium)

Capitaine Jacques Raphaël Roques (2 August 1897 – 24 May 1988) was a Swiss citizen who flew for the French during World War I, where he was credited with five aerial victories. He returned to military service during World War II, and served with the French Resistance from the fall of France to war's end.

== Background and early life ==
Roques was born in Paris to a Swiss father and a Venezuelan mother. He was still a student when the war broke out in August 1914, and in October 1914, while preparing for his baccalauréat, he attended a preparatory school close to Lycée Carnot where he befriended Robert Bajac, whom he would later serve alongside and share several aerial victories. He then learned to fly, being awarded Aéro-Club de France civilian pilot licence No. 2279 on 15 September 1915, and then volunteered to enlist in the French Army in November.

== World War I service ==
As a Swiss national Roques was assigned to the Foreign Legion unit 2ème régiment étranger, with service number 36810. On 13 March 1916 he was transferred to the Army's aviation branch, the Aeronautique Militaire, assigned to 1er régiment aviation and sent to the military flying school at Chartres for his basic military flying training. He was awarded Military Pilot's Certificate No. 3495 on 26 May 1916 and was promoted to corporal the same day. He receivedadvanced flight training, including fighter tactics and aerial gunnery, at the military flying schools at Avord, Pau, and Cazaux, completing his training in November 1916.

After two months in a reserve unit Roques was posted to Escadrille N.48 in early January 1917, based near Verdun, to fly Nieuport 17 fighters. From the beginning of April 1917, the escadrille began to replace its Nieuports with the SPAD S.VII, and thus would eventually be redesignated Escadrille SPA.48. Roques was promoted to sergeant on 25 April 1917, and gained his first aerial victory the following day, sharing in the shooting down of an Albatros over Loivre with Sergeant Robert Bajac. In mid-1917, Escadrille SPA.48 were moved to the Dunkirk area, and on 27 July Roques and Bajac, with Jacques Ortoli of Escadrille N.31, were credited with shooting down a Fokker two-seater over the forest of Houthulst in Belgium. On 10 August 1917, Adjudant Bajac was on patrol with Sergeants Roques and Hutteau when they spotted an apparently lone enemy aircraft, and despite orders to the contrary, Hutteau dove in to attack. However, the aircraft was the bait to a trap and the three French aircraft suddenly found themselves under attack by a group of Germans. Hutteau managed to escape and return to the French lines, despite having his aircraft riddled with bullets, while Bajac was wounded in the forearm and thigh, and lost consciousness briefly, recovering only 400 metres (1,300 ft) from the ground, and managing an emergency landing on a road. Only Roques escaped unscathed. On 13 September 1917 Roques was awarded with the Belgian Croix de guerre with palm, presented by King Albert I at Bergues, and in November he was promoted to adjudant.

On 19 February 1918 Sous-Lieutenant Bajac and Adjudants Roques and Edmond Caillaux, now flying the SPAD S.XIII, shot down a Rumpler two-seater which crashed near Nogent-l'Abbesse. Roques claimed shares in an enemy aircraft shot down on 17 May, and another two-seater downed on 11 June, but was not credited. However, on 12 June he and Bajac shot down a Fokker D.VII over Ressons-sur-Matz, and on 17 June he and Sous-Lieutenant Gilbert de Guingand shared in the downing of a Halberstadt CL.II over Chaudun. On 9 September 1918, after having gained the five confirmed victories required to become a flying ace Roques was awarded the Médaille Militaire.

By the end of the war his Croix de Guerre had three palms and the silver-gilt star (étoile vermeil), and he also received the Croix du combattant volontaire.

== Inter-war activities ==
Roques left the army in 1919, also becoming a naturalized French citizen the same year. He remained active as a reserve flying officer, and was made a Chevalier of the Légion d'honneur on 23 August 1925. He also served as technical director for the flight sequences in René Clair's 1927 film The Prey of the Wind. In 1930 he was listed as the owner of two Morane-Saulnier-built DH.60 Moths, F-AJQC and F-AJQD, and was still flying the latter in 1934. He transferred to the Armée de l'air when it became independent of the army in 1934, and on 30 May 1936 was made an Officier of the Légion d'honneur.

== World War II service ==
Roques was recalled to serve in the air force on 25 August 1939, with the rank of captain. Posted to Base airenne 112 at Chartres, he served as second-in-command of the 2e escadrille of Groupe de Chasse I/1, then as second-in-command of the entire Groupe from 10 January 1940. He was discharged from the air force on 31 July 1940, following the fall of France, but became an active member of the French Resistance for the rest of the war.

Roques died in Paris on 24 May 1988.
