= Louis Gardel =

French novelist, screenwriter and publisher (born 1939)

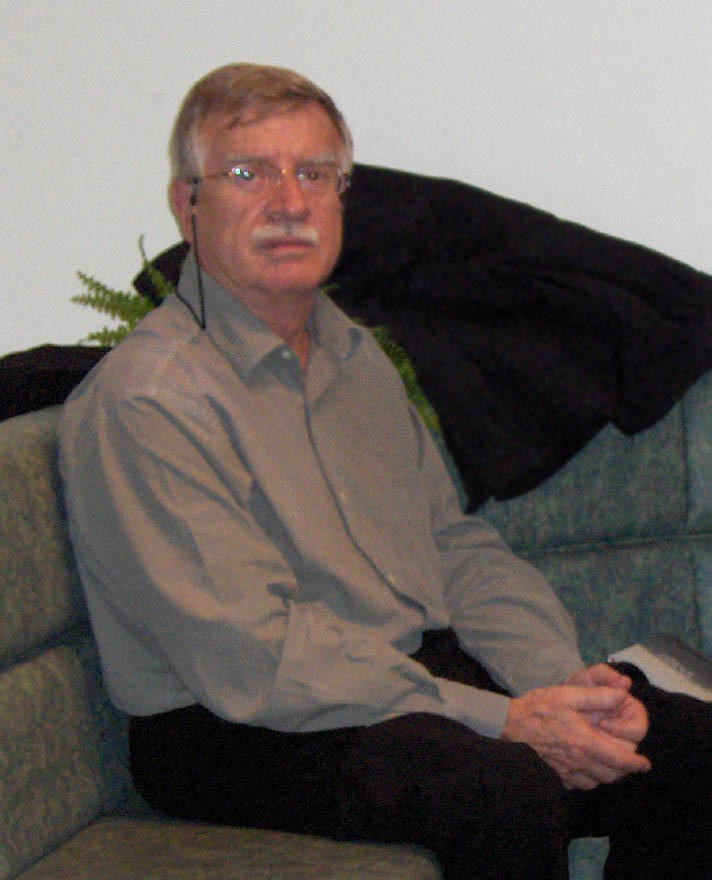
Louis Gardel

Louis Gardel is a French novelist, screenwriter, and publisher, born in Algiers in 1939. He is also publishing director of Éditions du Seuil and a permanent member of the Prix Renaudot jury.

== Bibliography ==
- L'Été fracassé (1973)
- Couteau de chaleur (1976)
- Fort Saganne (1980) (Winner: Grand Prix du roman de l'Académie française 1980)
- Le Beau Rôle (1986)
- Notre homme (1987)
- Dar baroud (1993)
- L’Aurore des bien-aimés (1997)
- Grand Seigneur (1999)
- La Baie d'Alger (2007)

== Screenplays ==
- Radetzky March (film) (1965) Director: Michael Kehlmann. Based on the novel by Joseph Roth
- Fort Saganne (1984) Director: Alain Corneau
- Nocturne indien (1989) Director: Alain Corneau
- Indochine (1992) Director: Régis Wargnier
- East/West (1999) Director: Régis Wargnier
- Himalaya, l’enfance d’un chef (1999) Director: Eric Valli
