= Armand de Turenne =

WW1 French flying ace

- Born: Armand Jean Galliot Joseph de Turenne; 1 April 1891; Le Mans, Sarthe, France
- Died: 10 December 1980 (aged 89); Paris, France
- Burial place: Rivière-sur-Tarn, Aveyron, France; 44°13′29″N 3°07′51.1″E
- Relatives: Henri de Turenne (son)
- Military career
- Allegiance: France
- Branch: French Army; French Air Force
- Service years: 1909–1912, 1913–1942
- Rank: Colonel
- Units: 10ème régiment de Chasseurs à cheval; 21ème régiment de Dragons; Escadrille VB 102; Escadrille N 48; 33ème régiment d'aviation; 1er groupe d'aviation d'Afrique; 6ème escadre d'aviation
- Commands: Escadrille SPA 12; Escadrille BR 234; Escadrille VR 543; 4ème groupe, 1er régiment d'aviation d'observation; 9ème escadrille, 31ème régiment d'aviation; 8ème escadrille, 31ème régiment d'aviation; 6ème escadre d'aviation; 42ème escadre aérienne; 4ème brigade de défense aérienne; 4ème escadre aérienne; Groupe de chasse 24; 8ème groupement de bombardement; 3ème groupement de bombardement
- Conflicts: World War I World War II
- Awards: Légion d'honneur Médaille militaire Croix de Guerre; Military Cross (Britain); Croix de Guerre (Belgium)

Colonel Armand Jean Galliot Joseph de Turenne, Marquis de Turenne d'Aubepeyre (1 April 1891 – 10 December 1980) was a French World War I flying ace credited with 15 aerial victories. He went on to serve his nation in the military until 1942.

== Early life and military career ==
Armand Jean Galliot Joseph de Turenne was born in Le Mans, Sarthe, the son of Guillaume Auguste Alyre Georges de Turenne and Marie Thérèse Madeleine Beaumevieille. On 15 April 1909 he volunteered to join the army for a period of three years, and served in the 10ème régiment de Chasseurs à cheval ("10th Light Cavalry Regiment"). He was promoted to brigadier ("corporal") on 10 February 1910 and to maréchal-des-logis ("sergeant") on 27 April 1911. His three years ended 13 April 1912, but he rejoined the army on 22 February 1913 and was posted to the 21ème régiment de Dragons ("21st Dragoon Regiment") based at Saint-Omer. He was promoted to maréchal des logis fourrier ("quartermaster-sergeant") on 18 December 1913.

== World War I ==
On 10 August 1914, within a week of the outbreak of World War I, de Turenne was appointed an aspirant ("officer candidate"). On 15 July 1915 he transferred to the Army's aviation service – the Aéronautique Militaire – as an observer/bombardier, serving in Escadrille VB 102 of the 1er groupe de bombardement based at Malzéville from 21 July to 6 August 1915. He then trained as a pilot, receiving military pilot brevet No. 2135 at military flying school at Pau on 21 December 1915, and was commissioned as a sous-lieutenant on 26 December.

After advanced training at military flying school at Avord from 4 January to 7 March 1916, he was assigned to the Réserve Générale de l'Aviation (RGA) from 7 March to 13 June, then finally to Escadrille N 48 on 13 June 1916 to fly Nieuport fighters. He scored his first victory on 17 November 1916, and was promoted to lieutenant on 31 December. He was made a Chevalier of the Légion d'honneur on 22 July 1917, his citation reading:

"A very courageous pilot who gives daily the highest example of boldness and initiative. On 6 July 1917 he downed, in the course of one flight, his third and fourth German planes, one of these in our lines. Cited in orders three times."

By 30 September 1917, he had half a dozen aerial victories to his credit. Five of them were shared, with fellow aces Jean Matton, Gilbert de Guingand, and René Montrion. De Turenne was appointed commander of Escadrille SPA 12 on 12 January 1918. In his nine victories with the SPADs of this squadron, he continued with teamwork in combat and branched out to become a balloon buster by downing two observation balloons. He not only shared victories with fellow aces Marcel Marc Dhome and Emile Regnier, but with several other pilots. An interesting sidelight on de Turenne's victory list is that he had only two solo victories, and there were no fewer than fifteen other pilots sharing one or more of the other thirteen triumphs. He was promoted to the temporary rank of captain on 17 July 1918, and this was made permanent on 25 December.

His achievements were not just personal ones; his squadron was cited in General Orders for their accomplishments under his command.

== Inter-war career ==
After the war de Turenne stayed in the army. He was appointed commander of Escadrille BR 234 on 29 March 1919, and on 6 July was made an Officier of the Légion d'honneur. He was seconded to the Saumur Cavalry School on 15 October 1919, then on 1 December was seconded to the régiment d'aviation d'Algérie-Tunisie at Hussein Dey, Algiers, and appointed commander of Escadrille VR 543. He returned to France to serve in the 1er régiment d'aviation d'observation, based at Tours from 1 August 1920. He was later appointed commander of the 4ème groupe, then from 10 June 1922 commanded 9ème escadrille and then 8ème escadrille of the 31ème régiment d'aviation. He was posted to the 33ème régiment d'aviation on 17 June 1922, taking command of a groupe on 9 February 1925. He was second-in-command of the 1er groupe d'aviation d'Afrique in Algeria from 20 February 1929, and was made a Commandeur of the Légion d'honneur on 2 July 1931. Appointed Deputy Commanding Officer of the 6ème escadre d'aviation at Reims on 26 August 1933, he also took part in the flight of thirty Potez 25 aircraft from France to French East Africa under General Joseph Vuillemin between 6 November 1933 to 15 January 1934. He then served as Commander of the 6ème escadre d'aviation at Reims from 1 February 1934, and was promoted to lieutenant-colonel on 25 March. He commanded the 42ème escadre aérienne at Reims from 1 January 1935, and the 4ème brigade de défense aérienne from 27 April 1937, receiving promotion to colonel on 15 June. The same year he took part in aerial exercises, and in a flight from Paris to Conakry with nine bombers.

== World War II ==
On the outbreak of World War II de Turenne was serving as the Commander of the 4ème escadre aérienne, stationed at Reims. He was appointed Commander of groupe de chasse 24, on 14 May 1940 during the battle of France. Following the French defeat de Turenne served in the Vichy French Air Force, as commander of the 8ème groupement de bombardement in Tunis from 19 October 1940, then as Commander of the 3ème groupement de bombardement at Oran from 1 February 1941. He was made a Grand Officier of the Légion d'honneur on 25 December 1941, but on 1 April 1942 elected to take unpaid leave for the next five years. He spent the rest of the war farming in Sidi Bel Abbès. He officially retired from the military on 2 April 1947.

== Personal life ==
De Turenne married Alice Aimée Anna Décrion at Sidi Bel Abbès, Algeria, on 24 June 1920. Their son Henri (1921–2016) was a journalist and screenwriter.

Colonel de Turenne died in the 5th arrondissement of Paris on 10 December 1980, and in buried in the de Turenne family vault in the cemetery of Rivière-sur-Tarn, Aveyron.
