= Escadrille SPA.48 =

WWI French Air Force unit (1915–18)

Escadrille MS 48 / N 48 / SPA 48
- Active: 1915–1918
- Country: France
- Branch: French Air Service
- Type: Fighter Squadron
- Mascot: The Crowing Rooster
- Engagements: World War I

Escadrille SPA.48 was a unit of the French Air Force during World War I.

== Unit history ==
Escadrille 48 was created on 29 March 1915 at Villacoublay near Paris, flying the Morane-Saulnier L. Active throughout the war at various locations on the Western Front, the escadrille replaced its aircraft with Nieuports in early 1915, then with SPADs at the end of 1916. By 11 November 1918 the pilots of the escadrille had logged 9,826 flying hours, with 54 confirmed and 48 probable victories, at a cost of 11 killed and 12 wounded.

== Commanders ==
Sources
Name	Appointed	Notes
Captain Paul Fernand du Peuty	29 March 1915	Served as Directeur du Service Aéronautique from 20 February to 20 August 1917. Returned to the infantry to command a battalion of Zouaves in October 1917 and was killed in action on 30 March 1918.
Captain François de Thonel d'Orgeix	5 September 1915	
Captain Jean Georges Fernand Matton	8 October 1916	Killed in action on 10 September 1917 near Koekelare, Belgium, probably by Josef Jacobs of Jasta 7.
Captain Jacques Victor Sabattier de Vignolle	12 September 1917	
Lieutenant Jean-Marie Thobie	13 February 1918	
Lieutenant Gilbert Sardier	23 July 1918	

== Notable members ==
- Albert Achard (3 April – 29 September 1915)
- René Dousinelle (13 April 1917 – October 1918)
- Gilbert de Guingand (22 April 1917 – 22 October 1918)
- Auguste Lahoulle (19 May 1916 – 4 January 1917 & 16 October 1917 – January 1918)
- René Montrion (6 April 1917 – 28 June 1918 †)
- Jean Navarre (1 – 24 February 1916)
- Jacques Roques (2 January 1917 – November 1918)
- Armand de Turenne (13 June 1916 – 12 January 1918)
- Edmond Caillaux (18 February 1896 – 22 January 1943)

== Aircraft flown ==
The following aircraft were operated by the unit between 1915 and 1918.

- Morane-Saulnier L
- Nieuport 10
- Nieuport 12
- Nieuport 11
- Nieuport 17 (& 23)
- SPAD S.VII
