= Malmy =

- Commune
- Location of Malmy
- Location within France Location within Grand Est
- Coordinates: 49°10′36″N 4°48′43″E
- Country: France
- Region: Grand Est
- Department: Marne
- Arrondissement: Châlons-en-Champagne
- Canton: Argonne Suippe et Vesle
- Intercommunality: Argonne Champenoise

Government
  - Mayor (2020–2026): Arnaud Percheron
- Area^{1}: 4.83 km^{2} (1.86 sq mi)
- Elevation: 128 m (420 ft)
- Population (2023): 38
  - Density: 7.9/km^{2} (20/sq mi)
- Time zone: UTC+01:00 (CET)
  - Summer (DST): UTC+02:00 (CEST)
- INSEE/Postal code: 51341 /51800
- ^{1} French Land Register data, which excludes lakes, ponds, glaciers > 1 km^{2} (0.386 sq mi or 247 acres) and river estuaries.

Malmy (French pronunciation: [malmi]) is a commune in the Marne department in north-eastern France.
