= La Contemporaine =

French library, archive center and museum

Coordinates: 48°51′24″N 2°18′47″E

La contemporaine
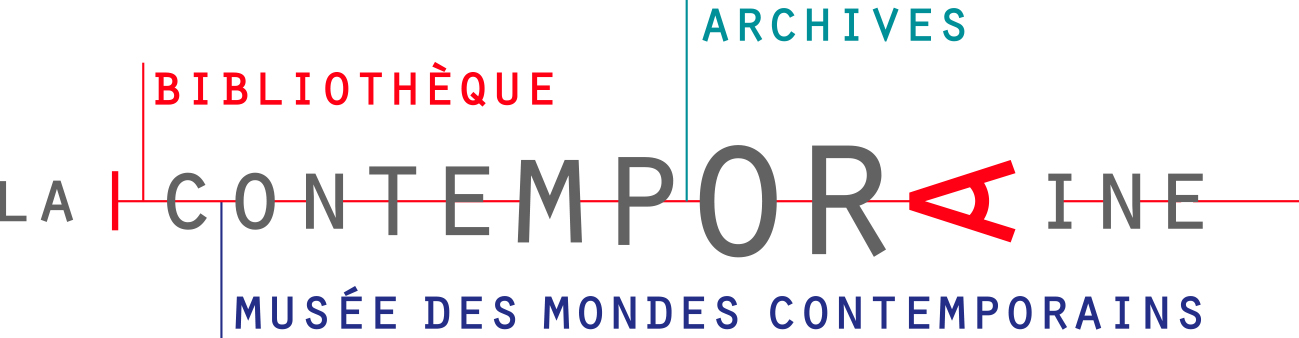
- Location: Nanterre, France
- Type: Research library
- Established: 1918

Other information
- Director: Xavier Sené (since 2022)
- Website: http://www.lacontemporaine.fr

La Contemporaine. Bibliothèque, archives, musée des mondes contemporains (The Contemporary. Library, archives and museum of contemporary worlds) is a French cultural and scientific institution composed of a library, an archive center and a museum, specialized in the history of the 20th and 21st centuries. Founded in 1918, it is located since 2021 in a new building on the campus of the Paris Nanterre University.

== Collections ==
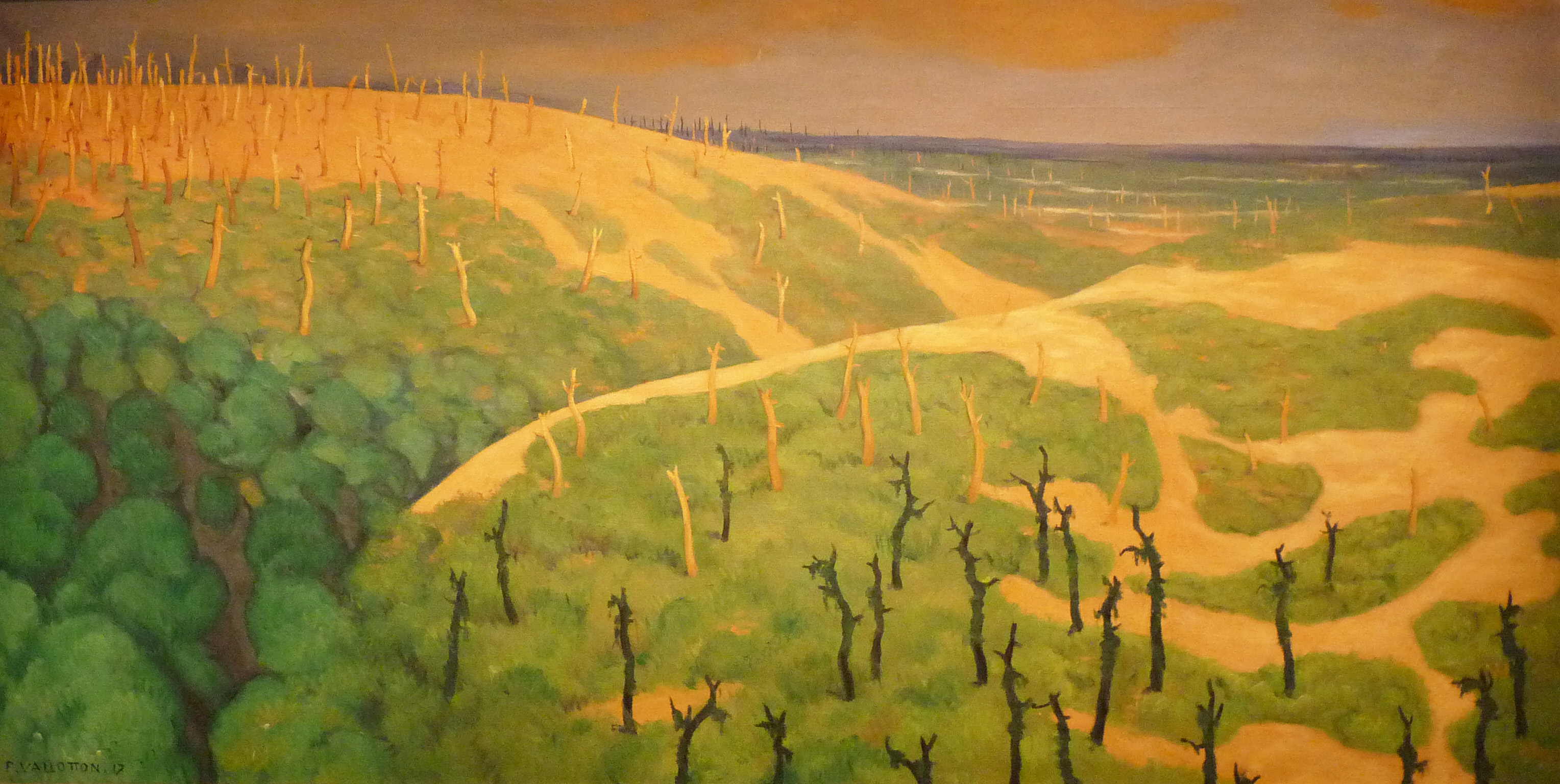
Le Bois de la Gruerie et le ravin des Meurissons (1917), painting by Félix Vallotton on the battlefields of the Argonne (Meuse, France) during World War I, part of the collections of la Contemporaine.

The collections of La Contemporaine focus on the following areas:

- wars and conflicts, in particular the two world wars
- exiles and migrations
- colonial empires and decolonization
- social movements and human rights
- history of international relations

The collections encompass a wide variety of materials, in several different languages (French, English, but also Russian, German, Spanish, Italian, Polish, Serbian and others). La Contemporaine holds close to 3 million text-based documents - books, newspapers and journals, as well as written and audiovisual archives; and nearly 1,5 million works in its image-based collections – posters (around 80.000), photographs (over 1 million units), paintings, drawings, objects, postcards... Its collections are recognized as unique due to the diversity of their origins, the range of topics covered, and the variety of the types of documents that are preserved.

== Activities ==
La Contemporaine acts as a preservation and research facility, ensuring its collections are made available to researchers, organizing scientific events and training sessions and workshops for students and pupils, but also as a cultural institution for the general public through a permanent exhibition as well as yearly thematic exhibitions. As part of its scientific mission, it carries out publishing activities, including of exhibition catalogues, resources guides as well as the journal Matériaux pour l'histoire de notre temps (Materials for our history's time).

It also develops partnerships with institutions both in France (for example as a member of the research libraries' network CollEx-Persée and of the CODHOS network of archive centres on social history) and internationally (for example as a member of the IALHI network of labour history institutions).

La Contemporaine created in 2014 its own digital library, L’Argonnaute, which gives free access to 200.000 digitized documents from its collections.

== History ==
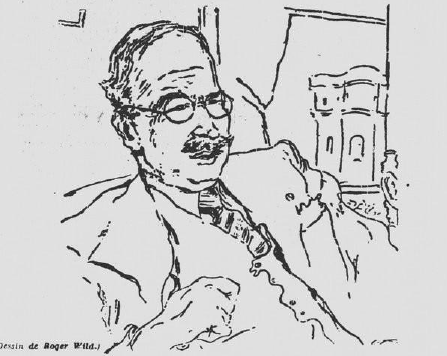
Director of the Bibliothèque-Musée de la Guerre Camille Bloch in his office at the Château de Vincennes.

The institution was founded in 1918 as the « Bibliothèque-musée de la Guerre » (BMG - Library-Museum of the War) on the basis of a private collection put together by French industrialists Henri and Louise Leblanc during World War I to document the ongoing conflict. In 1934, the BMG is administratively linked to the University of Paris and renamed « Bibliothèque de documentation internationale contemporaine » (Library of international contemporary documentation) or BDIC. It retains that name through several location and status changes, until it becomes « La Contemporaine » in 2018. Starting in 1970, the institution has two centers, the main one, hosting the archives and the library was located in the Paris Nanterre University campus, that was founded in the outskirts of Paris in 1964, while the museum ("Musée d'histoire contemporaine") was seated within the premises of the Hôtel National des Invalides in the 7th arrondissement of Paris. In 2021, both centers are relocated in a new facility created by architect Bruno Gaudin, at the entrance of Paris Nanterre University campus.

== See also ==
- List of libraries in France
- List of museums in France
