= Marcel Marc Dhôme =

WW1 French flying ace & racing driver

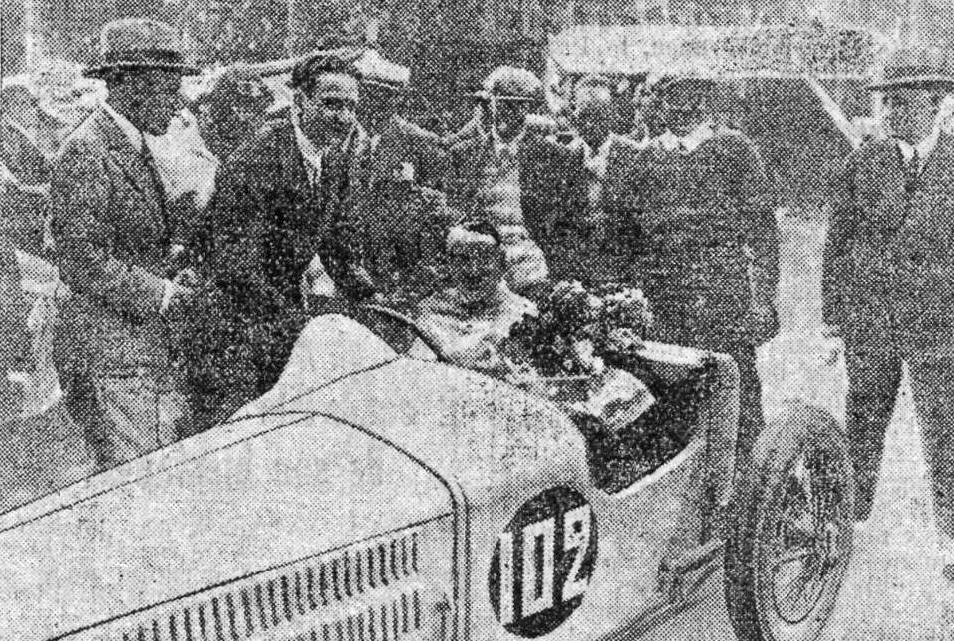
- Marcel Marc Dhôme, was a military person.
- Born: 24 January 1893; Neuilly-sur-Marne, France
- Died: 6 May 1960 (aged 67)
- Military career
- Allegiance: French Third Republic; France
- Branch: Aviation; infantry; aviation
- Service years: 1913 – 1955
- Rank: Colonel
- Units: 1e Groupe Aeronautique; 2e Groupe de Aviation; 140e Regiment d'Infanterie; 1e Groupe de Aviation; Escadrille 81
- Commands: Groupe de Chasse 1/55
- Conflicts: World War I; World War II; Korean War
- Awards: Légion d'honneur Médaille militaire Croix de Guerre; Mentioned in Dispatches five times
- Other work: Retired as a colonel in 1955

Colonel Marcel Marc Dhôme began his military career during World War I, when he became a flying ace credited with nine confirmed aerial victories. He also served France in World War II, and during the Korean War.

== Early life ==
Marcel Marc Dhôme was born on 24 January 1893 in Neuilly-sur-Marne.

== World War I ==
On 22 October 1913, Dhôme voluntarily enlisted for three years military service. He was assigned to aviation. After World War I broke out, on 25 September 1914, he was transferred to infantry duty. While in this assignment, he was wounded by shrapnel in the right thigh on 10 June. On 1 October 1915, he was transferred back to aviation to attend pilot's training. On 16 November, he reported to the aviation school at Buc. On 5 February 1916, Dhôme received his Military Pilot's Brevet, No. 2624. Six days later, he was promoted to Corporal. On 10 August 1916, he was assigned to instruct at Juvisy. On 14 December 1916, he was promoted to Sergeant.

Dhôme was then rotated through schools at Avord, Cazaux, and Pau. On 2 March 1917, he was stationed at Villacoublay. On 28 April, he reached a frontline unit when he was stationed with Escadrille 81 as a Spad VII pilot. He scored his first win on 12 August 1917. He shared his second triumph with another pilot a week later. After his third victory on 23 September, he was advanced to Adjutant on 15 November 1917. He downed an enemy plane on both the 11th and 15 December to become an ace, a feat which earned him the Médaille militaire to add to his Croix de Guerre.

Dhôme received his Médaille militaire on 2 January 1918. Two days later, he shared his sixth victory with Henri Albert Péronneau. Dhôme would reap three more wins during 1918, including a win over an observation balloon (which was shared with Armand de Turenne). On 11 August, Dhôme was awarded the Légion d'honneur. On 24 September, he was commissioned a Sous lieutenant.

== Post World War I ==
Dhôme competed in motor racing during the 1920s and 1930s, driving three- and four-wheeled cyclecars. Scattered records show him campaigning a Lombard in 1922 and 1929, a Sandford in 1923, a Morgan in 1924, and a Darmont-Morgan Blackburne in 1927. His last known entry in racing came in 1931. This was the same year he registered his private plane there in France; on 26 June 1931, he was listed as a part-owner for Potez 36.14 with civil marking FALJY.

He would be elevated within the Légion d'honneur to Officier in December 1932.

Dhôme also served during World War II, commanding Groupe de Chasse 1/55 and rising to the rank of commandant. He would be promoted to lieutenant colonel in 1945. In May 1947, he reached the top level of the Legion, becoming a Commandeur.

Marcel Marc Dhôme retired as a colonel on 24 January 1955. He died on 6 May 1960.

== Honors and awards ==
Médaille Militaire
"Brilliant pursuit pilot possessing courage and moral values. On 15 December 1917, he downed his 5th enemy plane which crashed in flames in our lines. One wound. Three citations." Médaille Militaire citation, 2 January 1918

Légion d'Honneur
"Elite officer of superb bravery and spirit. Constantly distinguishing himself as a pilot without equal by his scorn of danger and by his skill in combat. After having downed successfully seven enemy planes in the course of his daily combats, he reported his 8th and 9th victories over enemy planes over their lines, and several days later downed a balloon. One wound. Médaille Militaire for feats of war. Five citations." Légion d'Honneur citation, 11 August 1918

He also had been awarded the Croix de Guerre with eight palmes, an etoile de vermeil, and an etoile d'argent.
