= Henri de Turenne (writer) =

French journalist and screenwriter

Henri de Turenne (19 November 1921 – 23 August 2016) was a French journalist and screenwriter.

== Life and career ==
Henri de Turenne was born in Tours. The son of Armand de Turenne, a World War I flying ace, he was raised in Germany and French Algeria, both countries becoming central creative themes in his adult work.

After the Second World War, de Turenne worked as a journalist for Agence France-Presse, Le Figaro, France Soir, and ORTF, reporting from Allied-occupied Germany, covering the Korean War and the Algerian War, and, in 1952, winning the Prix Albert Londres.

Since the mid-1960s, he worked primarily in television, notably on the French Grandes Batailles series for Pathé, making over a hundred documentaries. He was the French producer for a documentary on the Vietnam War, "Vietnam: A Television History", which won six Emmy awards in 1984. His fictional works include Les Alsaciens ou les deux Mathilde (1996), made for Arte, for which he shared a 7 d'Or with Michel Deutsch.

== Filmography ==
- Les Grandes Batailles (series: 1967–1975)
- Les évasions célèbres (1972)
- Les Grandes Batailles du Passé (series: 1973–1977)
- Le Loup blanc (1977)
- Les Grands déserts (1981)
- Fort Saganne (1984)
- Sixième gauche (1990) (TV)
- Maigret et le fantôme (1994) (TV)
- Les alsaciens - ou les deux Mathilde (series: 1996–1997) (TV)
- La ferme du crocodile (1996) (TV)
- L'Algérie des chimères (2001) (TV)
- Apocalypse - La 2e guerre mondiale (2009) (TV)

== Bibliography ==
- Turenne, Henri de; Ducher, François; Deutsch, Michel; (1996). Les Alsaciens, ou, Les deux Mathilde. Paris: Jean-Claude Lattès. ISBN 978-2-7096-1713-0
- Turenne, Henri de; Soulé, Robert; (2000). L'Algérie des chimères. Paris : Jean-Claude Lattès. ISBN 978-2-7096-2138-0
