= Escadrille 15 =

French Air Force unit founded in 1912

Escadrille REP 15 - MS - 15 - N 15 - SPA - 15
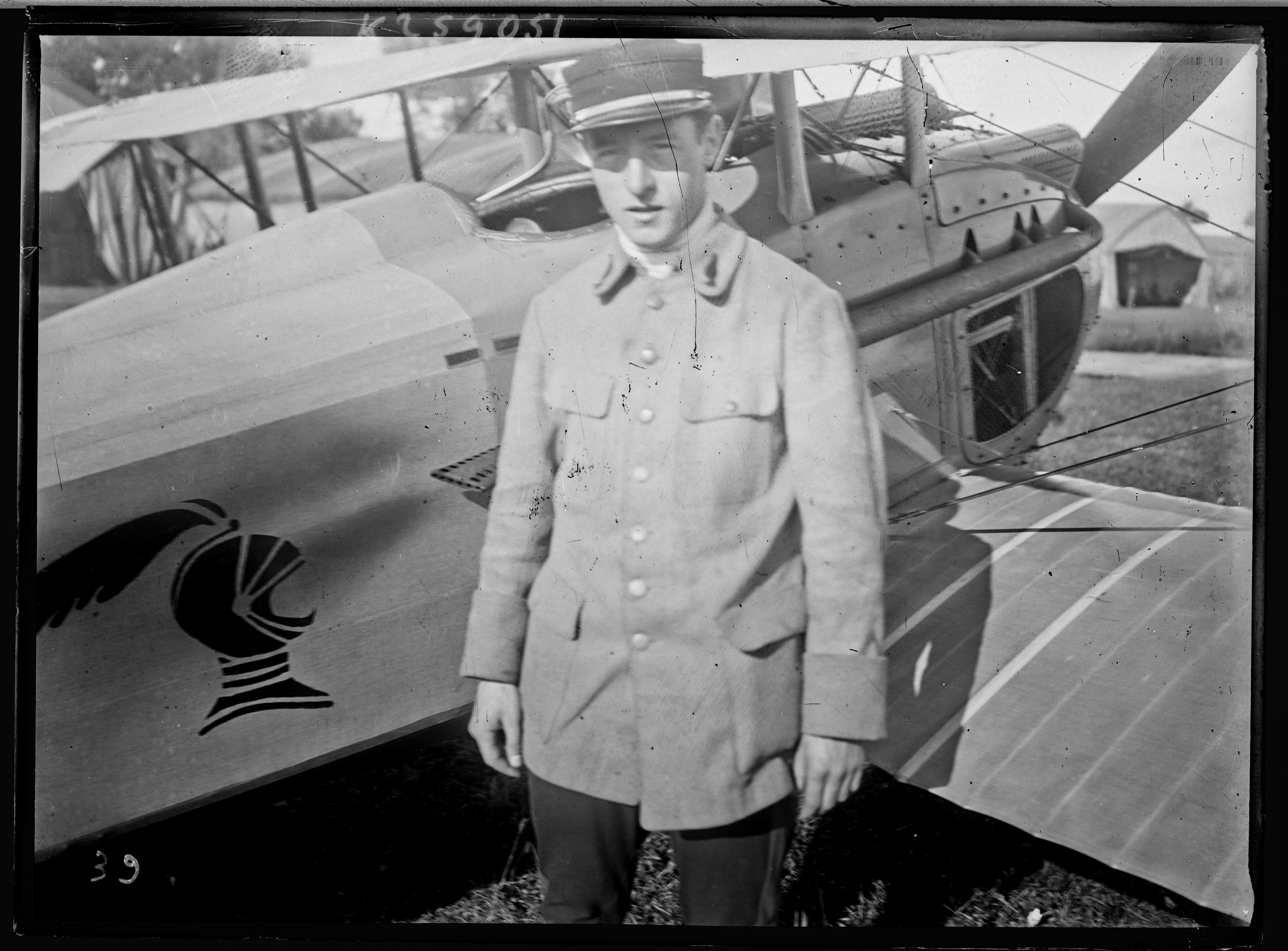
- French ace Gabriel Guérin in front of his SPAD S.VII aircraft, with the 'Casque de Bayard' (Bayard's Helmet), Escadrille 15 insignia.
- Active: 22 August 1912 - Present
- Country: France
- Branch: French Air Service
- Type: Fighter Squadron
- Home station: Reims
- Engagements: World War I

Escadrille 15 is one of the oldest units of the French Air Force, which was founded on 22 August 1912 at Reims, France, and is still active.

== History ==
Escadrille 15 was originally equipped with Robert-Esnault-Pelleterie K 80 machines. When World War I erupted, the escadrille went into action. It moved bases 16 times during August and September 1914. On 7 October 1914, it was posted to X Armee of the French Army.

On 30 March 1915, it re-equipped with Morane-Saulnier L aircraft, becoming Escadrille MS 15. In September 1915, it traded machines again, gaining Nieuport 11s and being renamed Escadrille N 15. The escadrille was then consolidated into an ad hoc Groupe de Chasse along with Escadrille F 16 and Escadrille N 57. Under the command of Capitaine Paul de Peuty, this groupe was committed to the Third Battle of Artois. On 24 October 1915, the groupe was cited for its performance.

In early March 1916, Escadrille N 15 moved to the vicinity of Verdun. On 8 May 1916, it was reassigned to X Armee. On 13 December 1916, it moved again, to VI Armee. It was gathered into the new Groupe de Combat 13 on 12 March 1917. The escadrille was detached again from 17 March to 6 June 1917, to support VI Armee. It then rejoined GC 13 for the remainder of the war.

On 17 October 1917, the escadrille was supplied with SPAD fighters, and became Escadrille SPA 15. Under its new designation, the unit would twice be cited for its deeds. On 10 September 1918, it again shared in a groupe citation. Out of the 166 aerial victories scored by GC 13, Escadrille SPA.15 was credited with 73 victories over aircraft and seven over observation balloons.

Escadrille 15 continues its service in the present French Air Force.

== Commanding officers ==
- Capitaine De Chaunac Lanzac
- Capitaine Rene Geible
- Capitaine Max Boucher: 30 March 1915 - 30 April 1915
- Capitaine Rene Turin: 1 May 1915 - KIA 6 September 1916
- Lieutenant Georges Louis: 7 September 1916 - 15 September 1916
- Capitaine Yves de Chambaudoin d'Erceville: 16 September 1916 - early September 1917
- Lieutenant Paul Gastin: early September 1917 - 8 October 1917
- Lieutenant Ferdinand Chevillion: 9 October 1917 - war's end

== Notable personnel ==
- Sous lieutenant Gabriel Guérin
- Sous lieutenant Bernard Artigau
- Sous lieutenant Lucien J. Jailler
- Adjutant Armond J. Berthelot

== Aircraft ==
- Robert Esnault-Pelterie K-80
- Morane-Saulnier L
- Nieuport 17: September 1915
- SPAD fighters: 17 October 1917
