= Armand Pinsard =

French fighter ace

Amand Pinsard
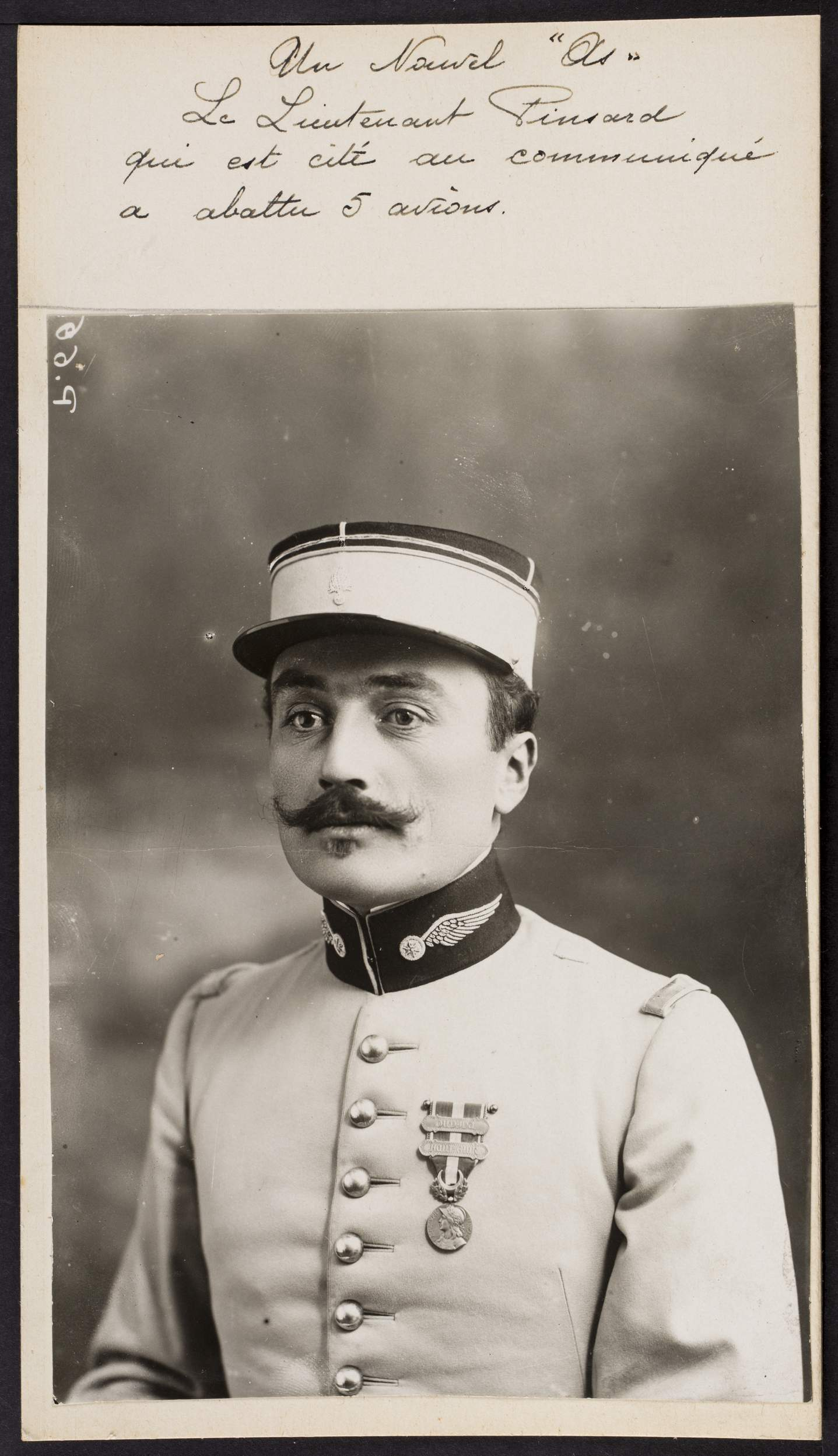
- Born: 28 May 1887; Nercillac, France
- Died: 10 May 1953 (aged 65); Paris
- Burial place: Ceyzériat
- Military career
- Allegiance: France
- Branch: 2nd Regiment de Spahis, Aéronautique Militaire
- Service years: 1906 – c. 1943
- Rank: General
- Units: 2nd Regt de Spahis, MS23, N26, SPA23, 34th Aviation Regt, Groupe de Chasse 21, Legion of French Volunteers
- Awards: Chevalier, Officer, Commander, and Grand Officer of the Légion d'honneur, Croix de Guerre with 19 palms, Médaille militaire, British Military Cross, Italian Military Medal, Moroccan Medal.

Général Amand Pinsard (28 May 1887 – 10 May 1953), Chevalier, Officer, Commander, and Grand Officer of the Légion d'honneur, Croix de Guerre with 19 palms, Médaille militaire, British Military Cross, Italian Military Medal, Moroccan Medal, was a World War I fighter ace credited with 27 victories. He remained in the French air service through World War II, rising to the rank of general.

== Life before World War I ==
Amand Pinsard was born in Nercillac, Department of Charente, in the cognac country of France. He joined the military in 1906 and fought in Morocco as a cavalryman in 2nd Regiment de Spahis. He was decorated there with the Moroccan Medal. He then transferred to aviation in May 1912, becoming one of the rare professional military men to become a prewar pilot. He trained as a pilot at Chateau Fort on a Borel pusher two seater aircraft, and proved to be a natural.

He was awarded the Médaille militaire for his performance flying a Morane in the French army maneuvers of 1913. He was assigned to MS 23 when World War I broke out.

== World War I service ==
At the outbreak of war, Pinsard was a sergeant major. In September 1914, he was promoted to adjutant and received his first citation. In October, he participated in a bombing raid that attempted to kill the German Kaiser. He was commissioned in November 1914 because of this bombing raid. It was about this time that he pioneered the use of an aircraft to place an espionage agent behind enemy lines, an act that brought him a second citation.

On 8 February 1915 he fell into German hands and was held prisoner of war when his plane was forced down behind German lines. It took him a month to recover from injuries received in the accident. Thirteen months and several attempts later, Pinsard tunneled under a 12-foot-tall (3.7 m) prison wall to freedom on 26 March 1916. It took him another two weeks to cross the lines into neutral Switzerland and to repatriate himself on 10 April.

His reward for his daring escape was retraining as a fighter pilot and an assignment to France's foremost fighter squadron, Les Cigognes. By July 1916, he was flying a Nieuport with Squadron N26. On 7 August, in a pioneering close air support role, he made no fewer than six firing passes on German troops attempting to counterattack a French unit. Then he and his three wingmen went on to strafe a train loaded with German troops. He was made a Chevalier of the Légion d'honneur for this action.

On 1 November 1916, he opened his victory roll in air combat. After a winter's layoff, he resumed his winning way on 23 January 1917, flying as Commanding Officer of Squadron N78. He became an ace on 6 March, and would continue to fly Nieuports into battle until his 16th victory on 5 June 1917.

Just one week later, Pinsard crashed and suffered serious injuries. He would be confined to hospital for several months. Upon his recovery, he was appointed commanding officer of Squadron Spa23. Pinsard was entrusted with the first Spad VII fighter to see combat, on 23 August 1917. He painted it black and entitled it, Revanche IV ("Revenge IV").

He picked up his victory skein with his 17th triumph on 20 February 1918. With his next win, on 4 May, he began a string that saw him down nine observation balloons in his final decade of wins. Rather remarkably, he had help downing only one of the heavily defended gasbags. His 27th victory came on 22 August 1918. Just eight days later, on 30 August 1918, he was appointed an Officer of the Légion d'honneur. Pinsard ended the war as a much-decorated captain.

== Between the wars ==
Pinsard remained in the Aeronautique Militaire after World War I. In 1925 he became a Commander of the Légion d'honneur. He served in the 34th Aviation Regiment from at least December 1929 through June 1932, mentoring a future ace, Camille Plubeau.

In 1937, he ascended to the top of the Légion d'honneur as a Grand Officer. Also in 1937, he once again met film maker Jean Renoir; Pinsard had once shot down a German Fokker that had been attacking Renoir's aircraft. Renoir based the main character of his movie La Grande Illusion on Pinsard. Ironically, the movie is considered one of the great anti-war movies of all time.

== World War II and beyond ==
Pinsard began World War II commanding Groupe de Chasse (fighter group) 21. His personal plane, a Morane Saulnier 406, was painted all black and nicknamed "The Pirate." He had just returned from a mission in it when a German bombing raid upon their airfield on 6 June 1940 wounded him so severely that his leg had to be amputated.

Despite this wounding, after the war was over, Pinsard was convicted of collaboration with the Nazis and sentenced to life imprisonment. He had served as Inspector-General of the Legion of French Volunteers Against Bolshevism, which had served with the Nazis on the Eastern Front. However, in 1946, his sentence was commuted to 10 years. He was released from prison in 1947, and had his pension reinstated in 1948. Pinsard's son, Jacques, who'd enrolled in the Milice in 1944, was also tried for collaboration, but fled to Argentina. He died in a road accident in 1947.

Pinsard died during a dinner in Paris that he was attending that was sponsored by a group of flying veterans. He was buried in Ceyzériat, Department of Ain.

== Awards and decorations ==
=== Chevalier de la Légion d'honneur ===
"Has shown, under particularly difficult circumstances, exceptional energy and tenacity. Posted to an escadrille de chasse, at his request, he has had numerous combats during the course of which his plane was riddled by bullets. On 7 August 1916, during an infantry attack, he made six strafing runs from a height of 200 meters as German reserves massed for a counter attack. Already cited twice."

=== Officier de la Légion d'honneur ===
"Incomparable escadrille commander, and at the same time an admirable pilot. Constant example of self-denial, spirit and sacrifice, a model of bravery, audacity and strength. Possesses the highest qualities of a leading pilot. Seriously wounded in 1917, he returned to take his place at the front and continue his glorious exploits, bringing his total to 25 victories. Chevalier de la Légion d'Honneur for feats of war, cited 13 times in army orders."
