= Pierre De Cazenove De Pradines =

French flying ace (1894–1982)

Pierre Fortaner Paul de Cazenove de Pradines
- Born: 14 April 1894; Nantes, France
- Died: 17 January 1982; Paris, France
- Military career
- Allegiance: France
- Branch: Aviation
- Rank: Sous lieutenant
- Unit: Escadrille 81
- Awards: Légion d'honneur Médaille militaire Croix de Guerre

Sous Lieutenant Pierre Fortaner Paul de Cazenove de Pradines (14 April 1894 – 17 January 1982) was a French World War I flying ace credited with seven aerial victories.

== Biography ==
Pierre Fortaner Paul de Cazenove de Pradines was born in Nantes, France on 14 April 1894. On 30 November 1914, he volunteered for three years military service. He successively served in a couple of cavalry units before being sent for pilot's training on 11 March 1916. He received his Military Pilot's Brevet on 15 July 1916. After further training, on 14 December 1916 he was posted to Escadrille 81. Between 26 May 1917 and 30 October 1917, he shot down four German airplanes and an observation balloon. In January 1918, he was commissioned as a Sous lieutenant. He would score two more victories in July 1918.
