= Georges Halberger =

French flying ace

Georges Charles Emmanuel Halberger
- Born: 5 May 1893; Montpellier, France
- Died: 6 October 1984 (aged 91); Poissy, France
- Military career
- Allegiance: France
- Branch: Flying service
- Rank: Adjutant
- Units: Escadrille 79; Escadrille 153
- Awards: Médaille militaire Croix de Guerre with four palms

Adjutant Georges Charles Emmanuel Halberger (5 May 1893 - 6 October 1984) was a French World War I flying ace credited with five aerial victories.

== Biography ==
Georges Charles Emmanuel Halberger was an artilleryman before transferring to aviation. He graduated pilot training with Military Pilot's Brevet No. 6378 on 13 May 1917. On 12 August, he was posted to Escadrille 79. On 6 September, he transferred to Escadrille 153. Nine months later, on 2 June 1918, he helped shoot down a German observation balloon for his first aerial victory. Fighting in consort with his squadronmates, he would shoot down another balloon, along with three enemy airplanes, by 18 October 1918. On 8 November, he was severely wounded while strafing a machine gun nest holding up German troops.

On 25 November 1918, a fortnight after the ceasefire, Halberger was awarded the Médaille Militaire. He had also earned the Croix de Guerre with four palms.
