= Palmes =

Palmes is a surname. Notable people with the surname include:

- Sir Brian Palmes, English landowner and politician
- Sir Guy Palmes, English politician
- Brian Palmes MP
- Lieutenant General Francis Palmes
- Major Billie Palmes
- Captain Laurence Palmes
