= Gabriel Guérin =

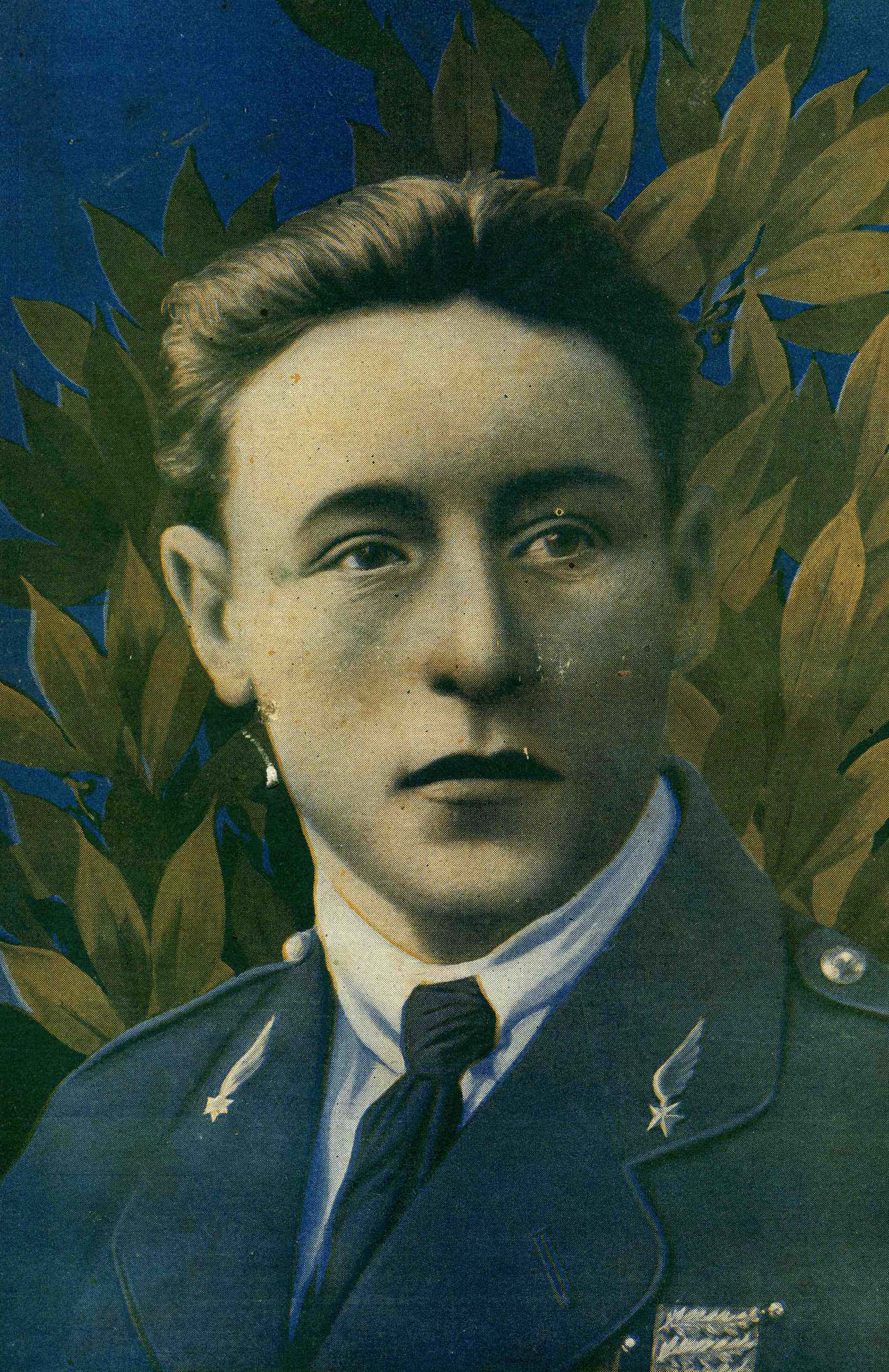
- Born: 25 July 1892; Morocco
- Died: 1 August 1918 (aged 26); Mont-l'Évêque
- Military career
- Allegiance: France
- Branch: Infantry; Air Service
- Service years: 1913–1918
- Rank: Sous Lieutenant
- Units: Escadrille 15, Escadrille 88
- Conflicts: World War I
- Awards: Legion d'honneur, Medaille militaire, Croix de Guerre

Sous Lieutenant Gabriel Fernand Charles Guérin (25 July 1892 – 1 August 1918), Legion d'honneur, Medaille militaire, Croix de Guerre, was a World War I fighter pilot credited with 23 confirmed aerial victories.

== Prewar life ==
Gabriel Fernand Charles Guérin was born in Le Havre, France on 25 July 1892. He joined the 28e Regiment d'Infanterie in October 1913, starting as a soldat de 2e class.

== World War I service ==
Guérin was cited for his service the first time in June 1915, when he had risen to soldat de 1e classe. He was cited a second time as a corporal in July 1916. The following month, he began aviation training. He received Pilot's Brevet 4981 on 10 December 1916.

After advanced training, he was posted to Escadrille 15, a Nieuport squadron on 25 April 1917. He scored his first aerial victory a month later. By July, he was a sergeant credited with four victories. He scored his sixth win on 26 August, and was awarded the Médaille militaire the next day. He was promoted to adjutant by 1 November, when he notched his seventh triumph. He closed out 1917 with 11 victories.

By 27 February 1918, when he was inducted into the Legion d'honneur, he was a triple ace. At some time during the summer, he had access to a Spad XII armed with a 37mm cannon and may have scored with it. Guérin had run his total to 22 when he was wounded in action on 11 May 1918. After convalescence, he was given command of Escadrille 88, a Spad squadron on 7 July 1918. Six days later, he was promoted to a commissioned officer as a lieutenant. Six days after that, he scored his 23rd victory.

On 1 August 1918, while taking off in a Spad VII, Guérin spun in to his death. His victory total of 23 included five shared victories; however, he also had ten claims unconfirmed. In addition to the Legion d'honneur and Médaille militaire, he had won the Croix de Guerre with 15 palms and two bronze stars.

== Citations for military decorations ==
Médaille Militaire, 27 August 1917:

"Never ceases to give the highest examples of bravery, strength, sang-froid, and devotion. On 23 July 1917, he downed his fourth enemy plane. Already cited five times in orders."

Chevalier de la Légion d'Honneur, 27 February 1918:

"Elite officer and incomparable pursuit pilot. Raises the morale and enthusiasm of his Escadrille by his great example, moral courage and the prestige of his victories. On 3 February 1918 he downed his 14th and 15th enemy planes. Médaille Militaire for feats of war and nine citations."
