= Château Fortia =

French wine producing estate

Coordinates: 44.052°N 4.839°E

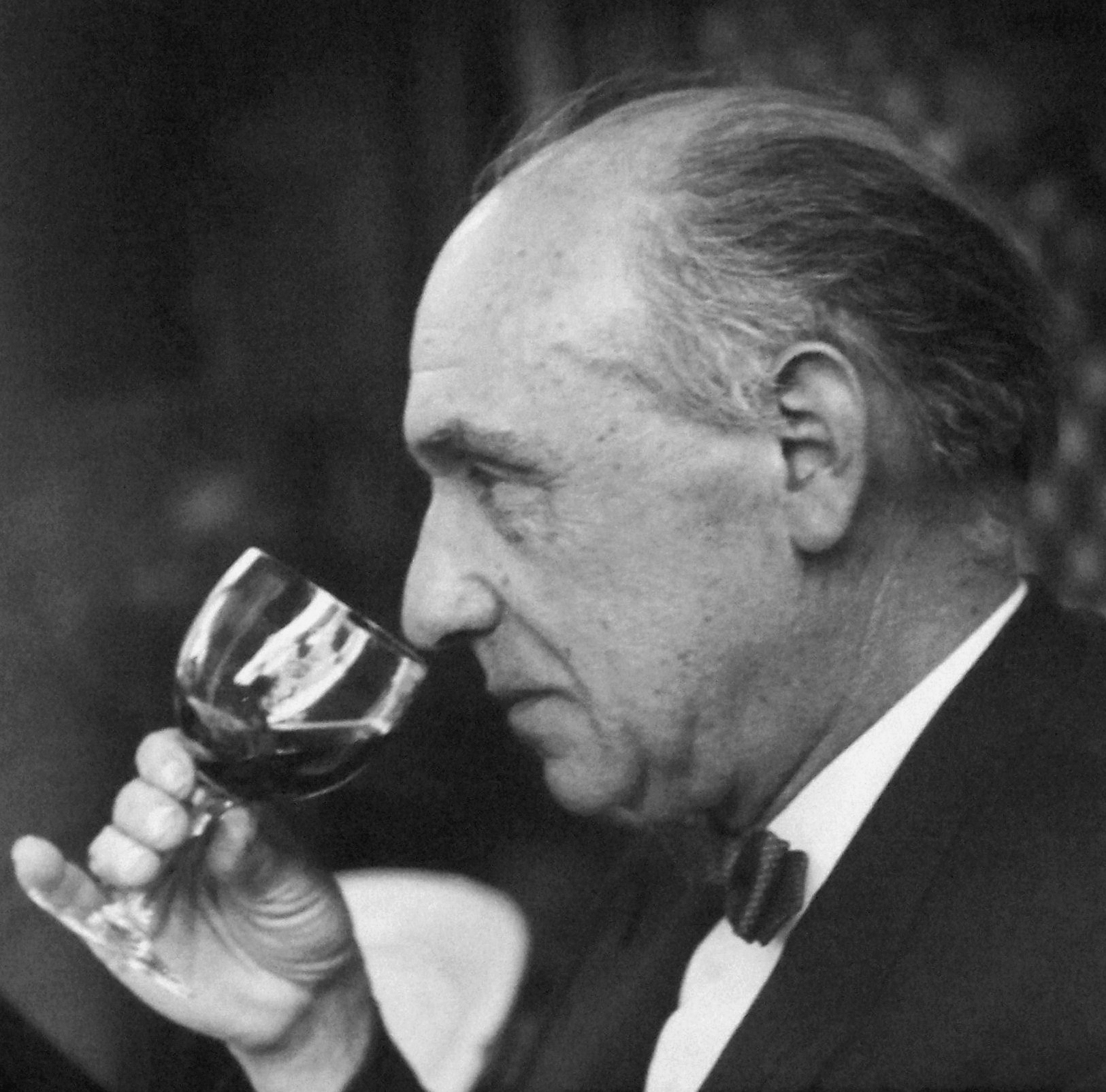
Baron Pierre Le Roy de Boiseaumarié of Château Fortia

Château Fortia is a French wine producing estate in the Châteauneuf-du-Pape region of the Rhône Valley. With a history dating back to the eighteenth century (on land that has been producing wine since at least the fourteenth century), Château Fortia has long been a notable producer in the southern Rhône. In the early twentieth century, the estate came under the direction of Pierre Le Roy de Boiseaumarié. Baron Le Roy went on to be co-founder of the Institut National des Appellations d'Origine (INAO) and guided the creation of the Appellation d'origine contrôlée (AOC) system which is the basis of not only French wine laws but has also been influential in the laws and appellation systems around the globe.

== History ==
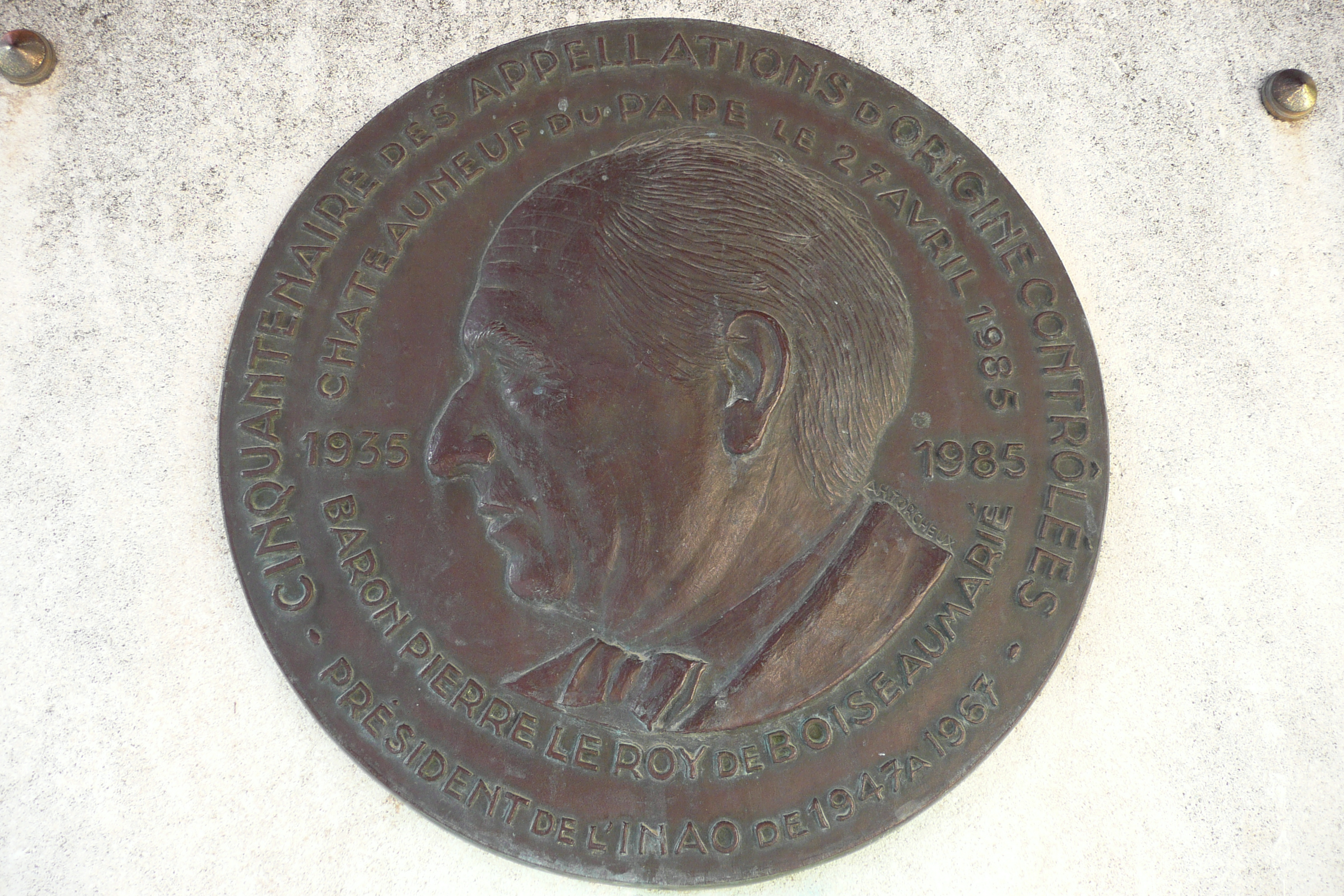
Plaque in Châteauneuf-du-Pape, commemorating the work of Château Fortia's Baron Le Roy in promoting the wines of the region

While the estate has a long winemaking history with ancient cellars that were constructed in the fourteenth century, the modern winemaking history of Château Fortia dates to the mid eighteenth-century when the Marquis de Fortia d'Urban leased a portion of his land in 1763 to sharecroppers who were producing wine. By 1783, the wine being produced from the estate was receiving favorable accolades from consumers in Northern Europe, the British Isles and the West Indies. In writings, the Marquis describes the red Châteauneuf-du-Pape as "... between that of Languedoc and Bordeaux. It is less smoky than the former and its bouquet close to the later."

In the early nineteenth century, the estate passed to a descendant of the Marquis de Fortia, Paul-Antoine de Fortia, who further expanded the vineyard plantings and buildings on the estate. By 1815 there were outside records of a castle La Fortiasse on the estate. In 1843, the Count de Ripert Monclar wrote favorably of the estate and described the hermitage that was among the vineyards. That same year, Paul-Antoine died and the estate passed to his heir Louis de Séguins-Pazzis, comte du Pazzi, who held the financially encumbered estate for only a short time before selling it to a local tax collector, M. de Orollée Virville. The estate continued to pass from owner to owner for the rest of the nineteenth century, being owned at one point by the French branch of the Gondi family, until it was purchased by Bernard Le Saint in 1890. Le Saint was a former director who maintained the official journal of the Egyptian government. He further expanded the estate and gave it its current name, Château Fortia. In 1919, his daughter Edmée married a decorated World War I pilot, Baron Pierre Le Roy de Boiseaumarié.

When Baron Le Roy died in 1967, the estate passed to his son Henri Le Roy. In 1994, Henri's son Bruno Le Roy took over as manager and continued managing the estate until 2004. Since 2001 until now, Didier Robert from ICV served as a consulting enologist and the quality of the wines increased. Since 2004, the estate has been run by Pierre Pastre (Chantal Le Roy de Boiseaumarié's husband) was nominated by the family to manage the estate.

=== Baron Le Roy ===
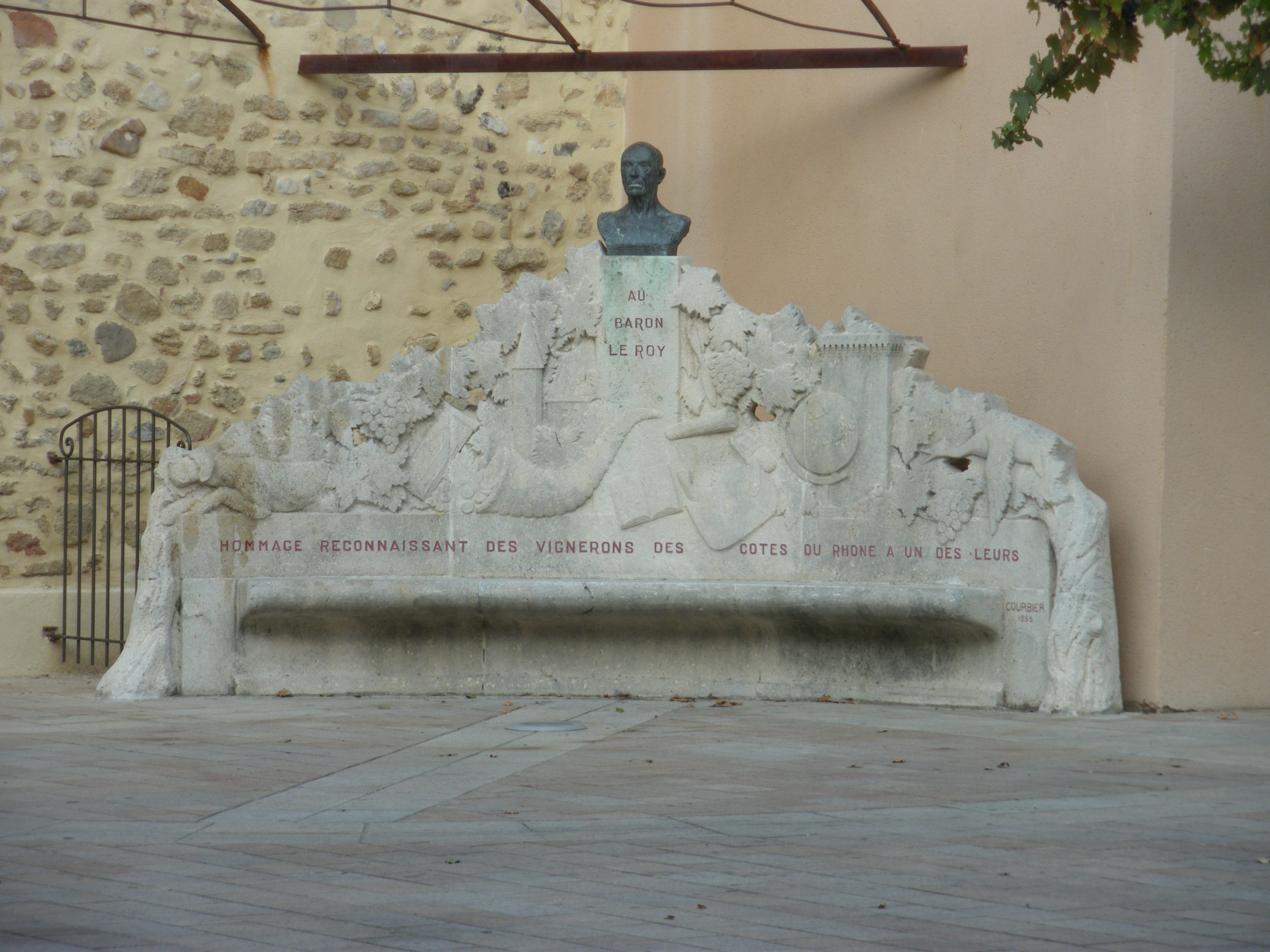
Bust dedicated to Baron Le Roy at Sainte Cécile les Vignes

Baron Pierre Le Roy de Boiseaumarié (5 April 1890-June 1967) was born in Mortagne, Normandy to a family that could trace its history back to the Crusades. As a teenager, Le Roy joined the uprising in the Languedoc over adulteration of wine and chaptalization led by French wine grower Marcellin Albert. Despite the threat from law enforcement, Le Roy was one of the participants who set fire to the Judicial Court of Montpellier. After the events settled down, Le Roy returned to education earning both bachelor of science and master of law degrees.

In 1914, Le Roy was drafted in the cavalry of the French Army but later changed service and became a pilot in the Air Force. After being shot down twice during World War I, Le Roy was awarded the Chevalier of the Legion of Honor and the Croix de Guerre (Military Cross). Returning home to Vendargues, he met married the daughter of Bernard Le Saint in 1919. He soon gained control of Château Fortia and became a prominent figure in not only the history of Châteauneuf-du-Pape but also the history of French wine. In 1935 he co-founded the Institut National des Appellations d'Origine (INAO) and, the next year, spearheaded the creation of the Appellation d'origine contrôlée (AOC) system that would become the basis of the French wine laws and continue to influence European wine laws into the twenty-first century.

The early plans for the INAO and AOC appellation were drawn up by Baron Le Roy in 1923 after a series of meetings among Châteauneuf-du-Pape growers. The growers were responding to the rising wine fraud that plague not only the Rhône but also most of France following the devastation of World War I and the phylloxera epidemic before it. This meeting would lead to the development of the Syndicat de Chateauneuf. Le Roy's plan, focusing then specifically on the Châteauneuf-du-Pape, was one of the first geographical delimitation of an area in France. (Previously, the Douro wine region of Portugal and the Tokaji region of Hungary were delimited by government decrees). Baron Le Roy's plan isolated an area around the village that was infertile and arid, suitable only for growing lavender, thyme and wine grapes.

Further drafting regulations on grape varieties, harvest, yields viticulture and winemaking techniques, under Le Roy's guidance Châteauneuf-du-Pape began using only manual harvesting and rejecting at least 5% of the harvest during sorting. Producers also stopped producing rosé and solely focused on making red and white blends from a set of permitted grape varieties. Le Roy's plan would go on to be the prototype of the AOC system that would eventually influence the Italian Denominazione di origine controllata (DOC), Spanish Denominación de Origen (DO) and Portuguese Denominação de Origem Controlada (DOC) systems as well as appellation systems around the globe.

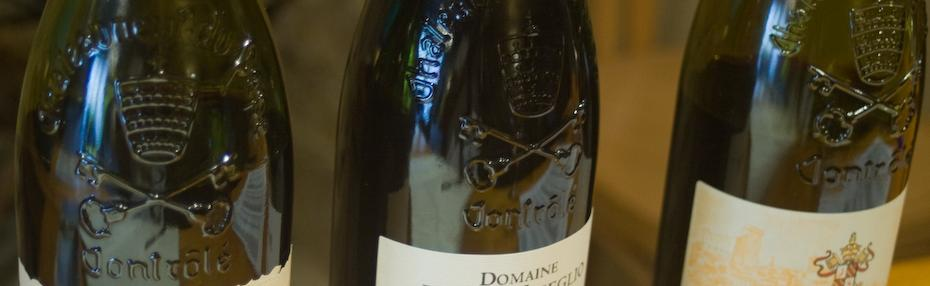
The embossed La Bouteille Armoriee logo featuring the crossed keys and papal tiara was developed by the Syndicat de Chateauneuf under Le Roy's leadership

In another lasting imprint on the Châteauneuf-du-Pape wine industry, the Le Roy led Syndicat de Chateauneuf introduced the La Bouteille Armoriee embossed bottle in 1937. This bottle, featuring the crossed keys of Saint Peter and papal tiara has become a symbol of the Châteauneuf-du-Pape wine region.

Over the course of his long career, Baron Le Roy was honored numerous times for his services to the advancement of the French wine industry. He served as president of the International Wine Office where he was nominated by his peers seventeen times. The French government made him a Commander of the Legion of Honor and in 1955 he received a bust at Sainte Cécile les Vignes.

== Estate ==
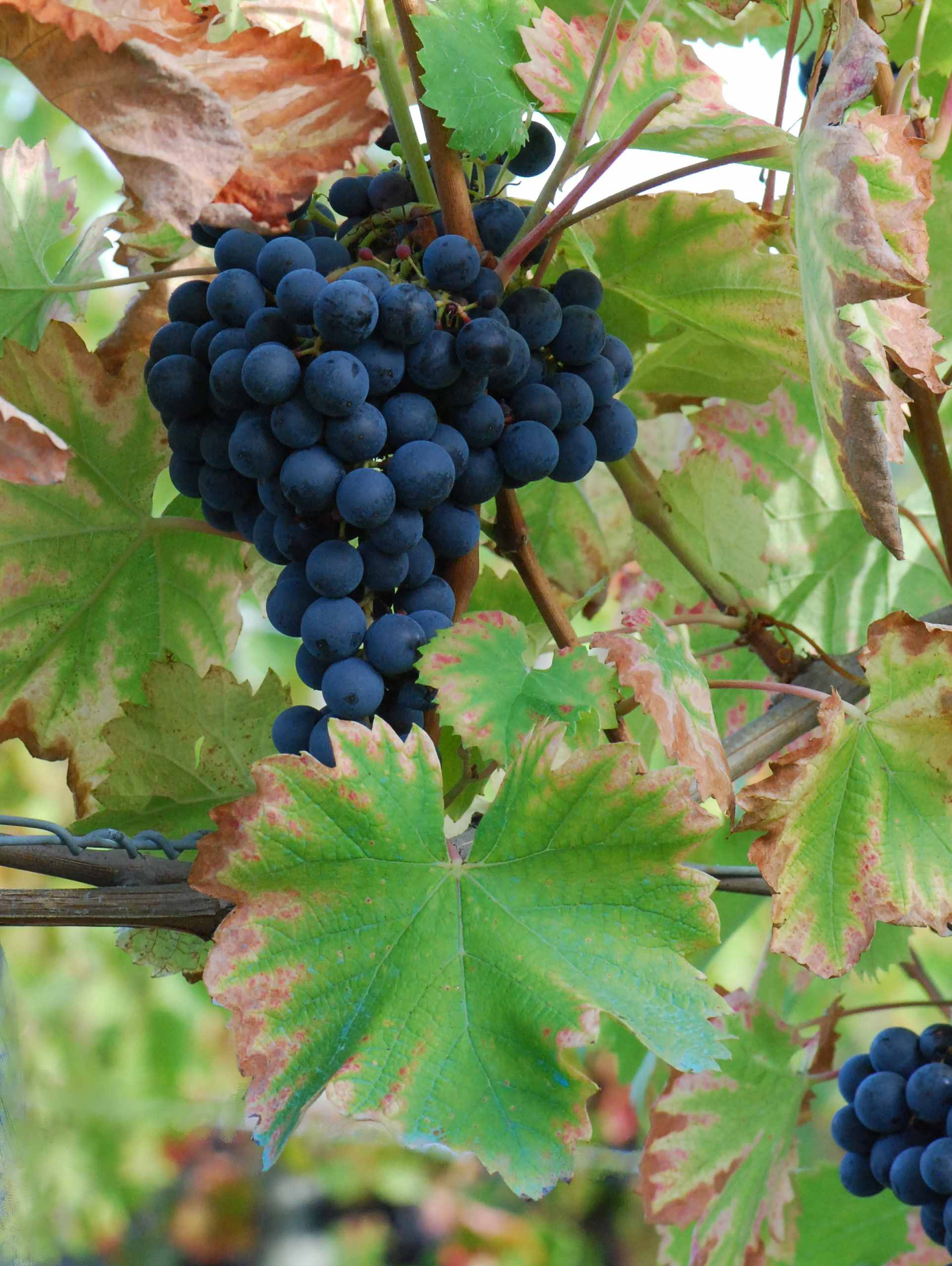
Mourvedre.

Château Fortia sits on a 30 hectare estate located just south-east of the commune of Châteauneuf-du-Pape. The vineyards constitute a single block that includes 27.5 ha (68.75 acres) of red grape varieties (mostly Grenache, Syrah and Mourvedre) and 2.5 ha (6.25 acres) of white varieties (mostly Clairette blanc, Roussanne and Grenache blanc). The vineyard soils range from sandy in the north to clay-limestone in the southern reaches of the vineyards which also feature the large galets roulés stones. The white grape varieties are mostly planted in the north with the southern galets roulés layered reaches dedicated to the red varieties.

The Château itself was built in a neo-Gothic style in the nineteenth century with the north-wing being built adjacent to ancient wine cellars that date to the fourteenth century. During World War II, most of the estate escaped damage from Allied bombing except for the ancient cellars which sustained significant damage and had to be partially restored. The damage came from a Royal Air Force mission in August 1944 to destroy a German headquarters located 7 miles north of Avignon with the Château being hit by collateral damage.

== Winemaking and wines ==
In most vintages, Château Fortia will produce a white and three red blends under the Châteauneuf-du-Pape AOC. The red grapes are usually destemmed and fermented separately in 150 hectoliter sized concrete tanks that are temperature controlled. After around three weeks of maceration and alcoholic fermentation, the wines are pressed and transferred to smaller 20–40 hl concrete tanks for malolactic fermentation and then racked off the lees. Finally the separate wines are blended into the cuvee and placed in large oak foudre barrels where they age for 12–18 months before being fined and filtered prior to bottling.

The single white bottling is produced from grapes that are immediately pressed soon after harvest and fermented in stainless steel tanks at around 68 °F (20 °C) until the wine is completely dry. The wines are then kept sur lie, however the winemakers take steps to prevent malolactic fermentation from taking place in order to maintain fresher aromas. The whites are usually bottled and release in the spring following harvest.
