= History of French wine =

The major wine regions of France.

The history of French wine, spans a period of at least 2600 years dating to the founding of Massalia in the 6th century BC by Phocaeans with the possibility that viticulture existed much earlier. The Romans did much to spread viticulture across the land they knew as Gaul, encouraging the planting of vines in areas that would become the well known wine regions of Bordeaux, Burgundy, Alsace, Champagne, Languedoc, Loire Valley and the Rhone.

Over the course of its history, the French wine industry would be influenced and driven by the commercial interests of the lucrative English market and Dutch traders. Prior to the French Revolution, the Catholic Church was one of France's largest vineyard owners-wielding considerable influence in regions such as Champagne and Burgundy where the concept of terroir first took root. Aided by these external and internal influences, the French wine industry has been the pole bearer for the world wine industry for most of its history with many of its wines considered the benchmark for their particular style. The late 20th and early 21st century brought considerable change—earmarked by a changing global market and competition from other European wine regions such as Italy and Spain as well as emerging New World wine producers such as California, Australia and South America.

== Early history ==
There is archaeological evidence to suggest that the Celts first cultivated the grape vine, Vitis vinifera, in Gaul. Grape pips have been found throughout France, pre-dating Greek and Roman cultural influences, with some examples found near Lake Geneva being over 12,000 years old. A major turning-point in the wine history of Gaul came with the founding of Massalia in the 6th century BC by Greek immigrants from Phocaea in Asia Minor. By the 2nd century BC, Massalia (by then known as Massilia) came under Roman influence as a vital port on the trade route linking Rome to Roman settlements at Saguntum (near what is now modern Valencia in Spain). Roman presence and influence in Massilia grew as the settlement came under attack from a succession of forces including the Ligurians, Allobroges and Arverni. Eventually the area became a Roman province first known as Provincia and later Gallia Narbonensis.

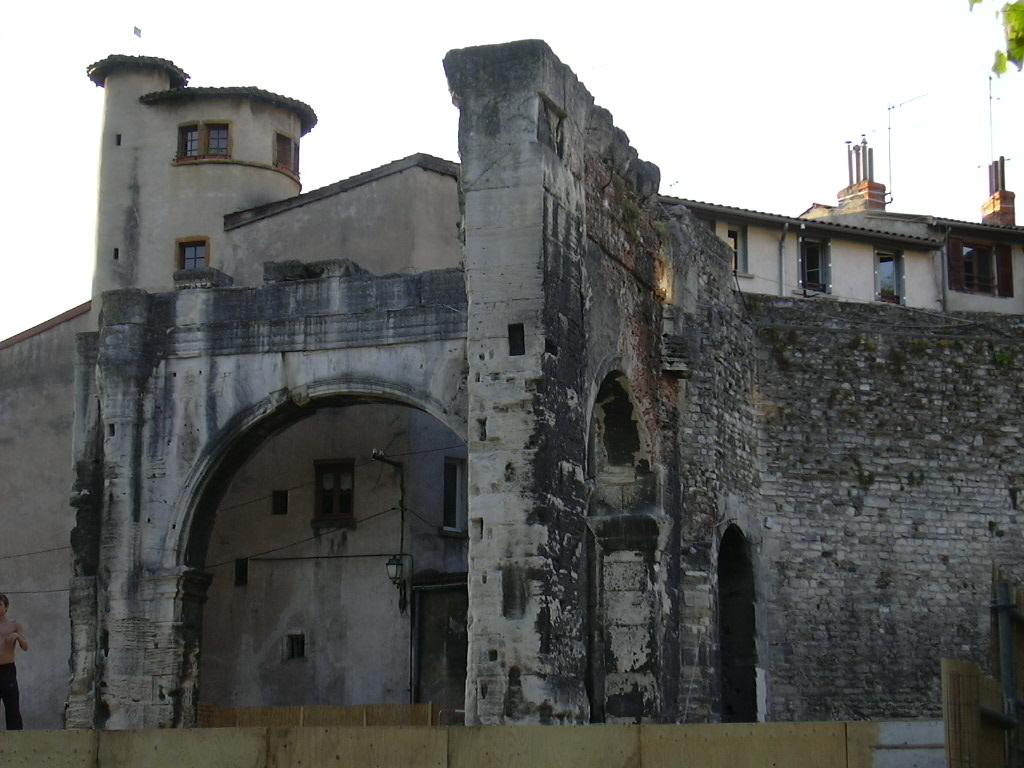
Roman ruins in Vienne. Pliny the Elder noted that the Allobroges in Vienne produced a resinated wine that was highly regarded by both the Romans and the locals.

The early Greek settlers brought a distinctly Mediterranean outlook to viticulture in Gaul. To their understanding, vines grew best in the same climate and area that would support olive and fig trees, therefore most of the early vineyard planting was in the warm, Mediterranean coastal areas. In 7 BC, the Greek geographer Strabo noted that the areas around Massilia and Narbo could produce the same fruits as Italy but the rest of Gaul further north could not support the olive, fig or vine. Under Roman rule, in the century and a half BC, the majority of the wine consumed in the area was required by law to be Italian in origin, as the distribution of fragments of wine amphorae found throughout Gaul after about 100 BC, especially along the coasts and rivers, suggests: some of the earliest amphorae, from the 2nd century BC, bear Iberian shipper's marks, indicating that distribution of wine predated conquest. It wasn't till the first century AD that there was a record of Gaul's wine being of any note or renown. In his Natural History (book xiv), Pliny the Elder noted that in the region near Vienna (modern day Vienne in the Rhone wine region), the Allobroges produced a resinated wine that was held in esteem and commanded a high market price.

It was also during the late first century BC/early first century AD that viticulture started to spread to other areas of Gaul — beyond areas where the olive and fig would grow, where a suitable variety was found to be the biturica, the ancestor of cabernet varieties. The high demand for wine and the cost of transport from Rome or Massilia were likely motivators for this spread. Archaeological evidence dating to the reign of Augustus suggests that large numbers of amphorae were being produced near Bézier in the Narbonensis and in the Gaillac region of Southwest France. In both these areas, the presence of the evergreen holm oak, Quercus ilex, which also grows in the familiar Mediterranean climate served as a benchmark indicating an area where the climate was warm enough to ensure a reliable harvest each year.

Expansion continued into the third century AD, pushing the borders of viticulture beyond the areas of the holm oak to places such as Bordeaux in Aquitania and Burgundy, where the more marginal climate included wet, cold summers that might not produce a harvest each year. But even with the risk of an occasional lost harvest, the continuing demand for wine among the Roman and native inhabitants of Gaul made the proposition of viticulture a lucrative endeavor. By the 6th century AD, vines were planted throughout Gaul including the Loire Valley, the Île-de-France (Paris Basin) which included the areas of modern-day Champagne, as well as Brittany.

The decline of the Roman Empire brought sweeping changes to Gaul, as the region was invaded by Germanic tribes from the north including the Visigoths, Burgundians and the Franks, none of whom were familiar with wine. The invaders set up kingdoms in Aquitaine, Burgundy and Île-de-France. By the time that Charlemagne established his kingdom in the late 8th century, power in France was polarised between south and north: unlike the Mediterranean south, where grapes were easy to cultivate and wine was plentiful, the more viticulturally challenged regions of the north saw wine as a luxury item and a symbol of status. The influence of the Christian Church (which had been largely permeated throughout the region since the 6th century) also enhanced the image of wine in France as it became an integral part of the sacrament of the Eucharist.

== Middle Ages through the Age of Enlightenment ==
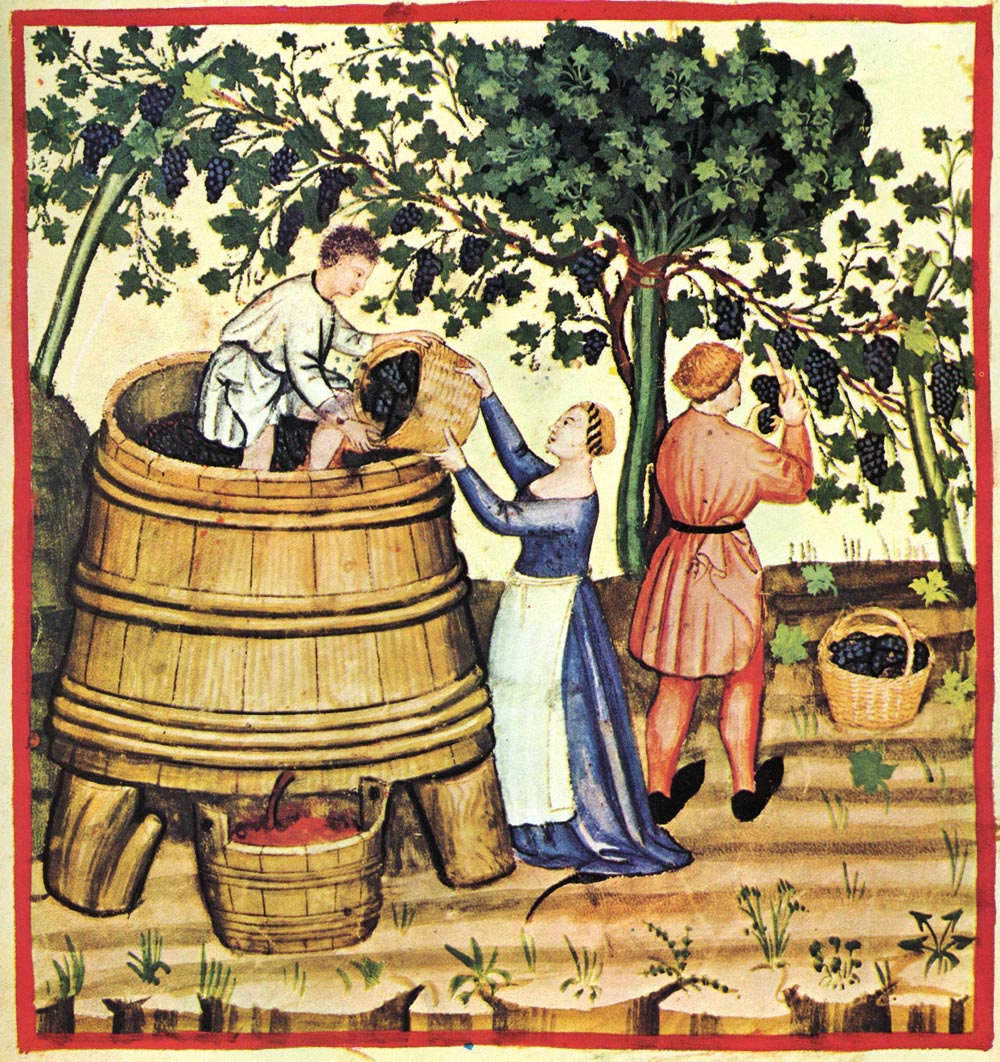
In Medieval France, the landownership system of complant promoted the planting of uncultivated lands with new vineyards.

During the Carolingian era, a new system of land development emerged that was intimately tied with the spread of viticulture in Medieval France. Under this system of complaint, a farmer could approach a land owner with uncultivated land with an offer to plant and tend to the area for a contracted amount of time. After the given length of time, half of the fully cultivated land would revert to full control of the original landowner while the remaining half would become the farmer's under the condition that a percentage or "tithing" of each year's crop would be paid to the original land owner. Under this system, many areas of France were enthusiastically and efficiently planted with little cost to the land owner; such as the Poitou region near La Rochelle. The modern day Loire Valley wine of Quarts de Chaume derives its name from the use of this practice back in the 15th century when the Abbey of Ronceray d'Angers owned a large portion of uncultivated land (chaume) which it contracted out to growers in exchange for a fourth (quart) of the wine produced on the land.

In the Middle Ages, transportation of heavy wooden barrels of wine over land was a costly and risky proposition. Wine regions close to easily navigable rivers, such as the Loire and Garonne, found the possibility of trade to other regions and outside France more attainable and profitable while more isolated and landlocked regions like Burgundy had a harder time developing much of a trade market outside their region. Port cities like Bordeaux, La Rochelle and Rouen emerged as formidable centers of commerce with the wines of Gascony, Haut Pays, Poitou and the Île-de-France. During this period, political climates and alliances played a substantial role in the trade of French wines to other European countries. The 1152 marriage of Eleanor of Aquitaine with Henry Plantagenet, the future Henry II of England, was the beginning of a long and fruitful relationship between Bordeaux and England. The 1295 Auld Alliance between France and Scotland against England gave the Scots ample access to French wines for themselves. At the height of its power, the Duchy of Burgundy included the southern parts of the Netherlands and Flanders—introducing the Dutch to the wines of Burgundy.

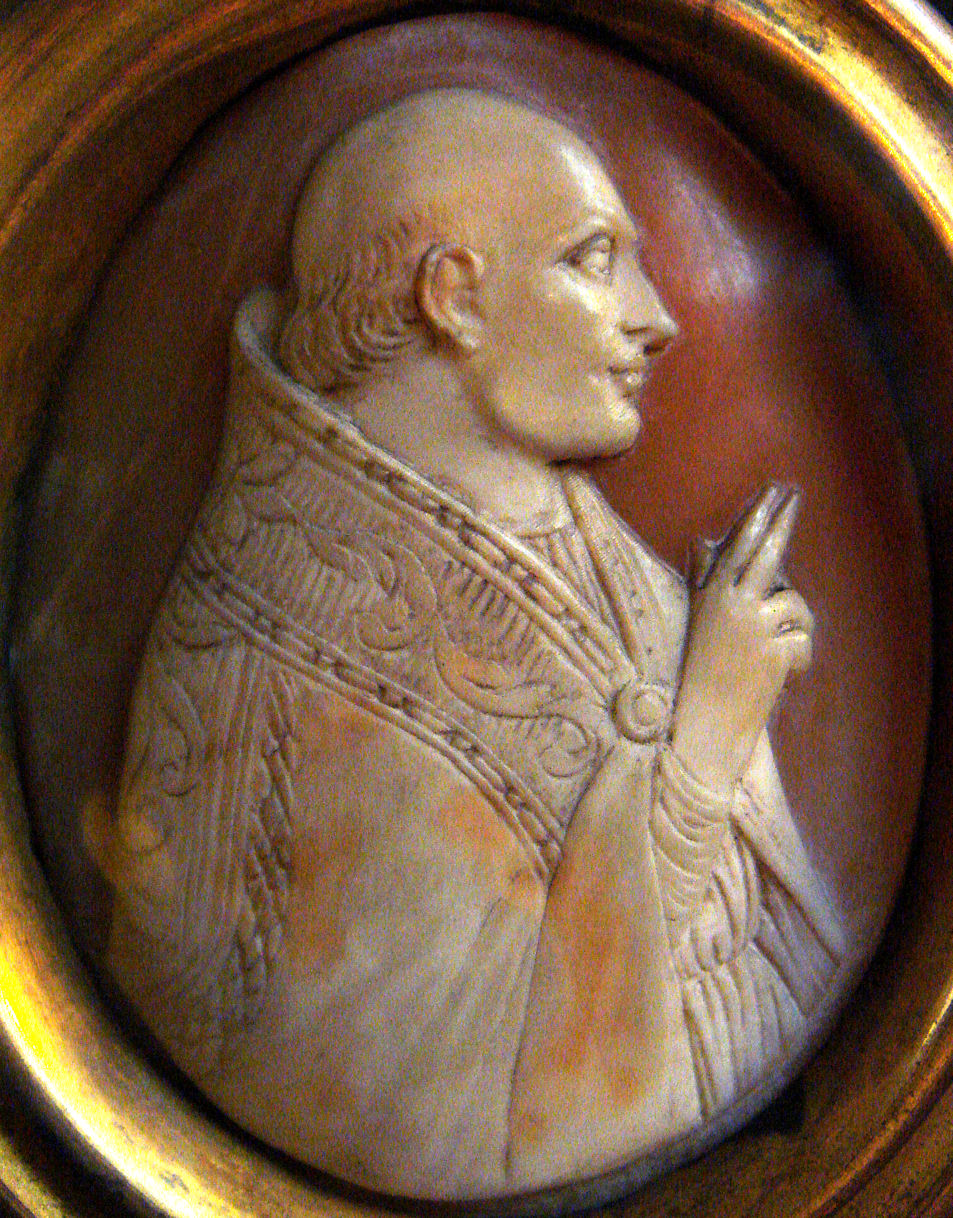
Pope Clement V was a native of Bordeaux and owned the vineyard estate in Graves that is today known as Château Pape Clément.

The 1305 election of Pope Clement V was followed by the move of the papacy from Rome to Avignon. During this time, the wines of the Rhone and Burgundy region received a higher profile due to their preference by the Avignonese popes. When Petrarch wrote to Pope Urban V, pleading for his return to Rome, he noted that one obstacle to his request was that the best Burgundy wines could not be had south of the Alps. Following the prominence of Burgundy wine during the Avignonese papacy, the Valois Dukes of Burgundy took a keen interest in leveraging the region's wines into power and status. The Duchy would become one of the most powerful in France and very nearly its own kingdom—fueled in part by the prestige of the region's wines.

The 14th century was a period of peak prosperity for the Bordeaux-English wine trade that came to a close during the Hundred Years' War when Gascony came back under French control in 1453. Following the expulsion of the English, Dutch wine traders took on a more prominent role in Bordeaux. The Dutch were avid traders, buying wine from across Europe (particularly the Mediterranean countries) for trade with Hanseatic states, and were eager to capitalize on the potential of the French wine industry. For most of the 16th and 17th centuries, the Dutch traders would play an intimate role in the fortunes of the French wine industry. (See Influence section below).

The Age of Enlightenment saw an increase in the study and application of winemaking methods with University sponsored studies and treatises on wine related topics. In 1756 the Academy of Bordeaux invited students to write papers on the topic of clarifying wines and the advantages or disadvantages of using egg whites as a fining agent. In Burgundy, the Academy of Dijon sponsored a study on ways to improve the quality of Burgundy wine. In the vineyards, vignerons began focusing more on which grape varieties performed best in different areas and augmenting their plantings to capitalize on their findings.

== Revolution to Phylloxera ==
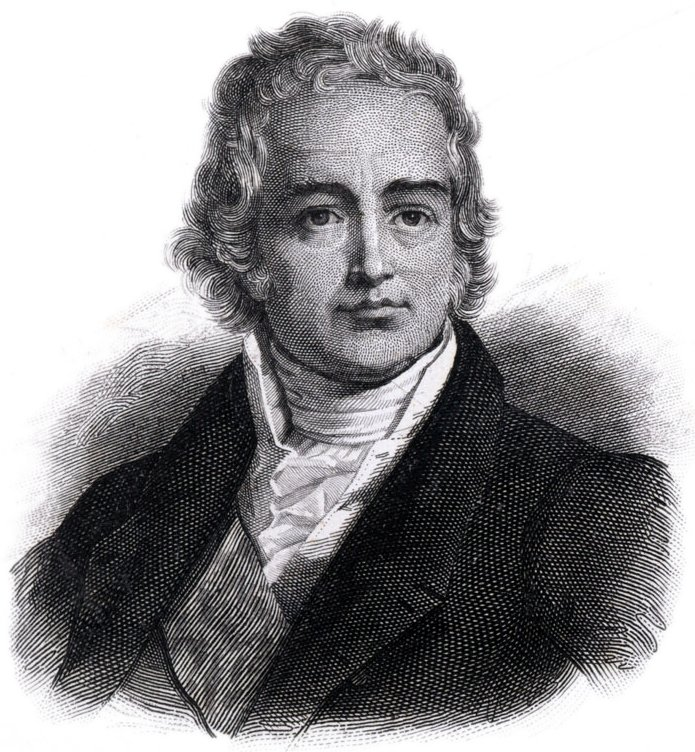
As Minister of the Interior, Jean-Antoine Chaptal played an important role in helping the French wine industry recover from the French Revolution.

Following the French Revolution there was an increase in the amount of poor quality French wine being produced. Jean-Antoine Chaptal, the Minister of the Interior for Napoleon, felt that a contributing factor to this trend was the lack of knowledge among many French vignerons of the emerging technologies and winemaking practices that could improve the quality their wines. In 1801, Chaptal compiled this knowledge into a treatise Traité théorique et pratique sur la culture de la vigne which included his advocacy of adding sugar to the wine to increase alcohol levels—a process now known as chaptalization. Chaptal's treatise was a turning point in the history of wine technology as it synthesized the knowledge current to the beginning of the 19th century.

By the mid 19th century, the wine industry of France enjoyed a golden period of prosperity. A new class of consumers, the bourgeoisie, emerged as a strong market for wine and other culinary products. The Gironde region of Bordeaux, in particular, enjoyed a swell of interest from both the Parisian market as well as its steady trade with England. For the 1855 Paris Exposition, Emperor Napoleon III commissioned the Bordeaux merchants to come out with a ranking of the region's wine estates. The 1855 classification of Bordeaux would become one of the world's most famous rankings of wine estates. Wine was becoming a cornerstone of the French economy and a source of national pride as French wine enjoyed international recognition as the benchmark standards for the wine world.

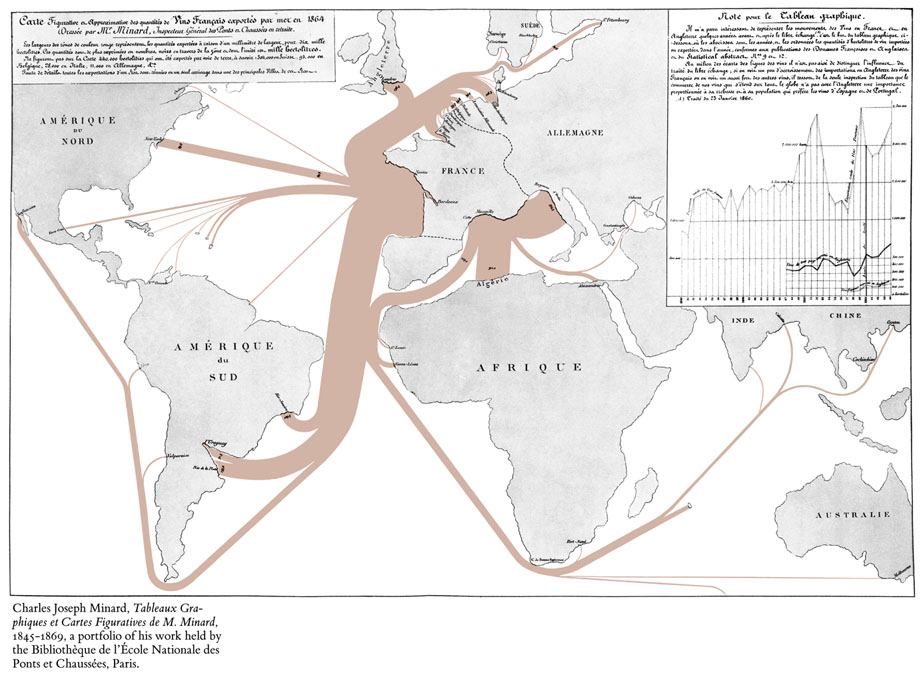
Charles Joseph Minard’s map of French wine exports for 1864.

A series of events brought this golden age of prosperity to an end. In the 19th century, scientific interest in collecting botanical species led to the exchange of many specimens from around the world—with the unintended consequence of introducing new diseases and allments to populations that had no natural resistances to these diseases. North America, in particular, was the source of several grape ailments that would devastate the French wine industry. It started in the 1850s with the introduction of powdery mildew, or oidium, which not only affected the skin color of the grapes but also reduced vine yields and the resulting quality of the wines. The 1854 vintage was particularly hard hit, producing the smallest yields seen in more than 60 years. A solution to the problem was discovered in 1857 when Henri Marès devised a technique of sulfuring vines to combat oidium.

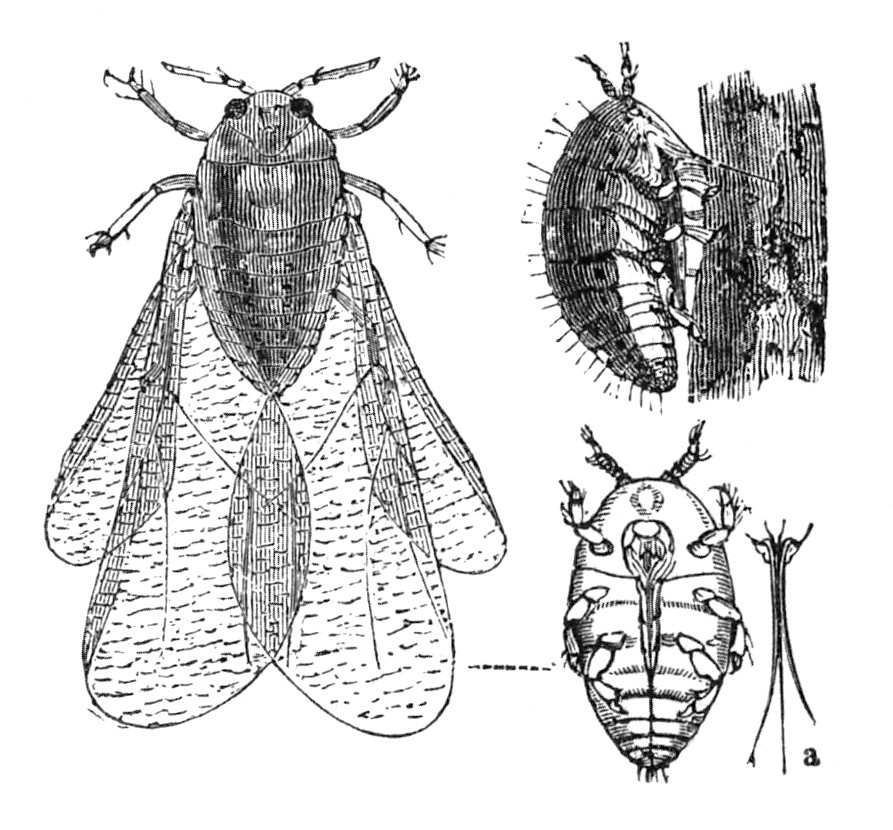
Both the problem and the solution to the phylloxera (pictured) epidemic came from the importation of plant specimens from North America.

But just as French vignerons were recovering from oidium came a new mysterious ailment that caused decay or death in the grapevines. The cause was a tiny louse, known as phylloxera, imported from North America. This louse targets the rootstock of the vine. The solution to this epidemic also came from North America in the grafting of naturally resistant American rootstocks to the European vines. However, while the importing of this new North American plant material helped to stave off the phylloxera epidemic, it brought with it yet more problems-the fungal disease of downy mildew that first surfaced in 1878 and black rot that followed in the 1880s.

The devastation to French vineyards brought with it the opportunity to explore new plantings and many vignerons began to experiment with hybrid plantings—starting first with the American hybrids (such as Delaware and Clinton) with genes from the more resistant American vines species and then moving on to French hybrids (such as Chambourcin and Vidal blanc) that produces wines with flavors more similar to European Vitis vinifera.

== To the modern day ==
In the late 19th century the French government commissioned Louis Pasteur to conduct a study on the problems plaguing the French wine industry. His findings had a lasting influence on the science of French winemaking. Pasteur was asked to help identify wine quality control issues that caused spoilage and other faults. During the 3 to 4 years that Pasteur spent studying wine he observed and explained the process of fermentation—noted that it was living organisms (yeast) that convert sugar in the grape must into alcohol in some form of chemical reaction. He also noted the presence of glycerol and succinic acid in wine as well as the beneficial process of adding tartaric acid during winemaking. Another observation that Pasteur made was that oxygen played a significant role in the aging and improvement of wine.

Pasteur identified several causes of wine spoilage including some that could be controlled during winemaking. He noted that "graisse" was due to the production of polysaccharide, degradation of sugars led to mannitic acid and that the degradation of glycerol led to bitterness in the wine. Pasteur found that the particular problem of Burgundy wine spoiling and turning into vinegar on long voyages to England was caused by the bacterium acetobacter. The results of Pasteur's studies revolutionized the French understanding of winemaking and eventually spread to other wine regions across the globe.

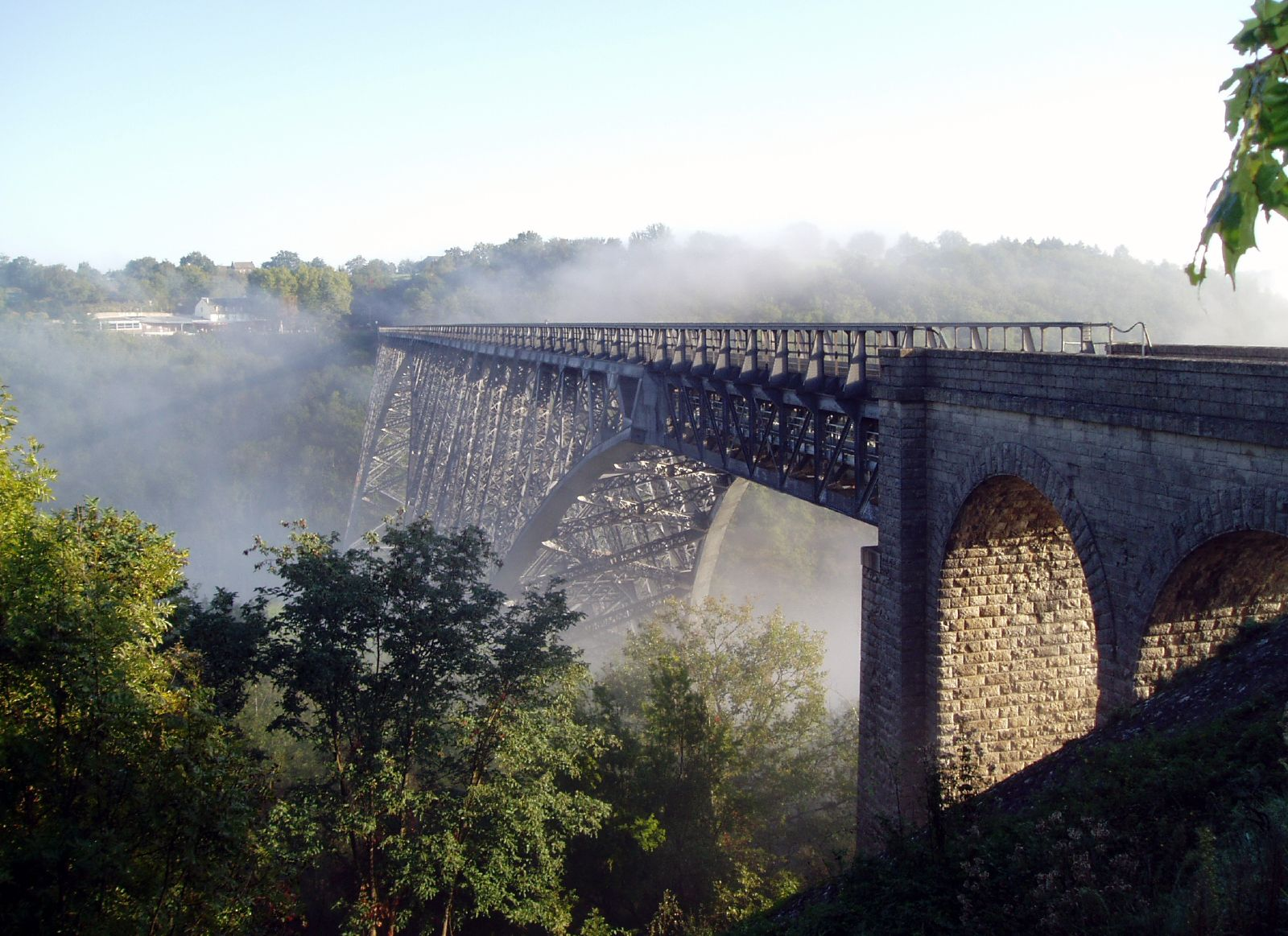
The development of railway networks throughout France opened up new opportunities for wine regions that were historically disadvantaged due to the lack of river-based trading routes.

The development of railway systems broadened the horizon for trade in French wines. Regions that were not historically dependent on river transportation suddenly found new opportunities and more commercial interest in their wines now that they could be transported more easily. The Languedoc region of southern France became a vastly planted expanse of land churning out great numbers of light, simple wines that were sent all over France. Many of these wines were "improved" in alcohol, color and weight with the addition of Algerian wine from the French colony in Africa—providing a sizable impact on the Algerian economy until that country's independence in the mid 20th century.

The 20th century brought two world wars which had devastating effects on some French wine regions, but also brought a renewed focus on reorganization of the country's wine industry. The development of the Institut National des Appellations d'Origine (INAO) and the Appellation d'origine contrôlée (AOC) systems, spearheaded by Châteauneuf-du-Pape producer and lawyer Baron Pierre Le Roy, emphasized the identity of French wines and the concept of terroir. Programs have been enacted, in conjunction with the European Union, to combat the "wine lake" surplus problem by uprooting less desirable grape varieties and ensuring that vignerons receive technical training in viticulture and winemaking. Many of these actions came in response to declining domestic consumption and slumping sales that followed through the close of the 20th century. Heading into the 21st century, some parts of French wine industry have thrived while others have been faced with a crisis of confidence.

== Influences on the French wine industry ==
Throughout its history, the French wine industry has been shaped by the influences of both external and internal forces. Three of the more prominent and pervasive influences came from the English/British people through both commercial interest and political factors, the Dutch who were significant players in the wine trade for much of the 16 and 17th century and the Catholic Church which held considerable vineyard properties until the French Revolution.

=== The British ===
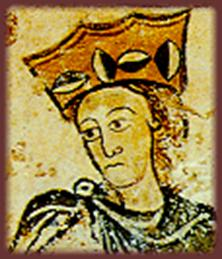
The marriage of Eleanor of Aquitaine to Henry II of England would have a dramatic influence on the development of the prominent French wine region of Bordeaux.

Over several centuries, a number of factors contributed to the prominent influence that Great Britain has had over the French wine industry. With a cool wet climate, the British Isles have historically produced dramatically different styles of wines than the French and in quantities too small to satisfy the London market. This caused the English to look abroad for wines, using the clout of their economic and political power to their advantage. The 1152 marriage between Eleanor of Aquitaine and the future King Henry II of England brought a large portion of southwest France under English rule. When Henry's son John inherited the English crown, he sought to curry favor among the Gascons by bestowing upon them many privileges-the most notable of which was an exemption among Bordeaux merchants from the Grand Coutume export tax. With this exemption and favored treatment in London, Bordeaux wine became the cheapest wine in the London market and gained immense popularity among the English, who call it claret. For over the next 300 years much of Gascony, particular Bordeaux, benefited by the close commercial ties with the English allowing this area to grow in prominence among all French wines. In the aftermath of the Hundred Years War, these lands reverted to French rule but with a lasting imprint of English influence.

Following the restoration of Charles II to the British crown, several French wines came back into fashion in the London market. One such wine was a fizzy drink from the Champagne region that was disparaged among French wine drinkers for its faulty bubbles. A French expatriate, Charles de Saint-Évremond, introduced this sparkling style of Champagne to the London court and it was met with enthusiastic popularity. The development of stronger, thicker bottles by British glass makers encouraged more Champagne winemakers to actively start producing sparkling wine for the lucrative British market.

=== The Dutch ===
In the 16th and 17th century, the Dutch (particularly those from Holland and Zeeland) wielded considerable influence over the development of French wine. Their strength was their sizable merchant fleet and trading access across Northern Europe in places like the Baltic and Hanseatic states. When political conflicts between the French and English flared up, it was the Dutch who stepped in to fill the void and serve as a continuing link funneling the wines of Bordeaux and La Rochelle into England. The town of Middelburg earned a reputation across Europe as a center for trade of French wine.

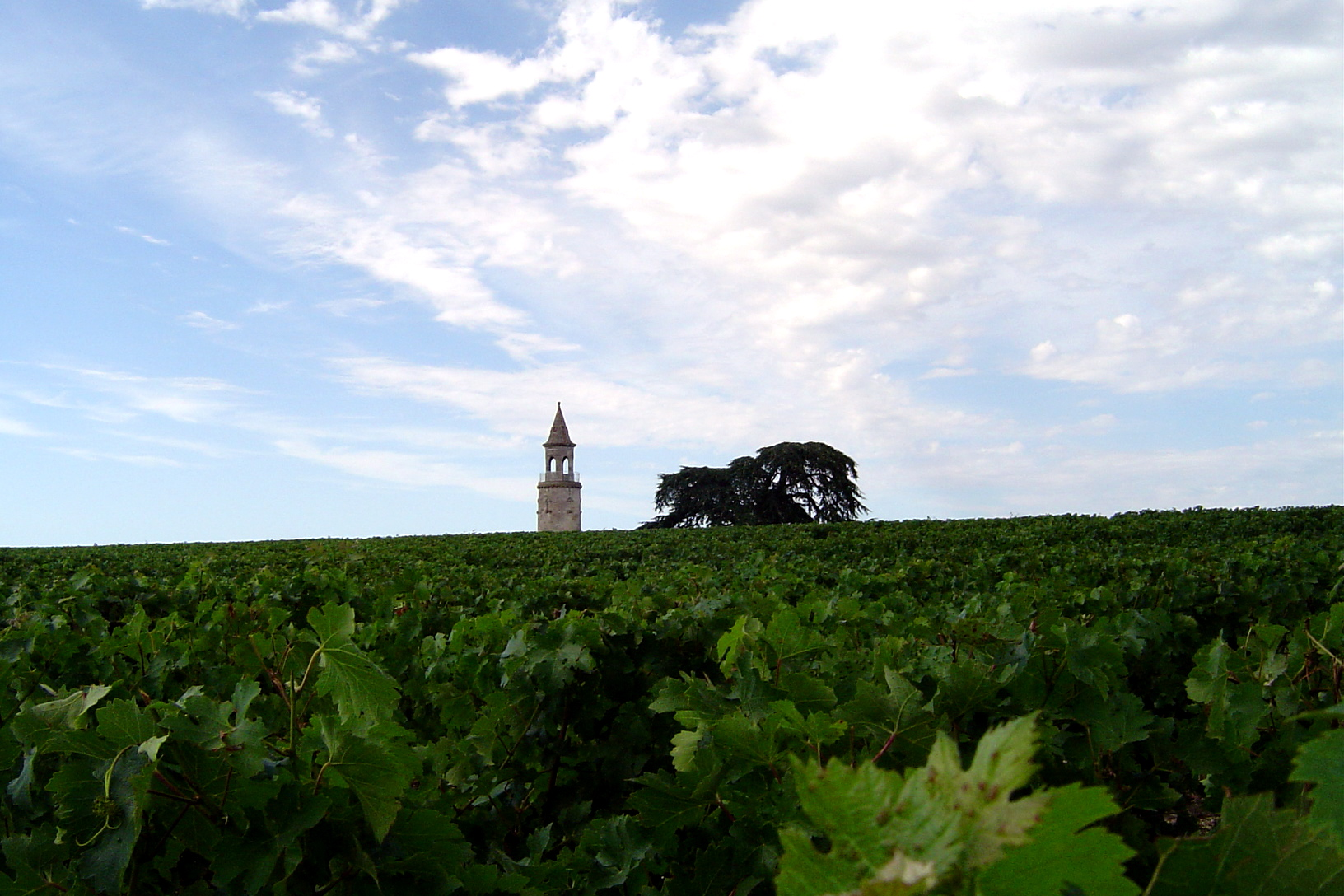
During the Middle Ages, the Medoc region was a marshy plain more suitable for growing corn than grape vines. The skill of Dutch engineers was put to use in draining the marshes, making the region suitable for planting grape varieties like Cabernet Sauvignon and Merlot.

Dutch interest in the wine trade prompted advancement in winemaking styles and technology. One problem that plagued the French wine trade was the perishability of wine which rarely survived longer than the next vintage. French wine during this period was often unbalanced and unstable, being not properly clarified during wine making and lacking the alcohol needed to preserve the wine. This was of concern to the Dutch who would sometimes be delayed in their trading with ports along the Baltic and White Seas when they became impassable in the winter. To ward off spoilage the Dutch developed methods of fortification by adding brandy to the wine to stop fermentation and increase the life expectancy of the wine. The Dutch further introduced to the French a method of sulfuring the wines (known as allumettes hollandaises) which has the effect of stabilizing the wine and preventing some degree of spoilage. The introduction of new Dutch winemaking techniques helped antiquated methods such as the use of lead fall into disuse. Used since the days of Ancient Rome, lead was used in regions such as Poitou to help sweeten and preserve some of their wines leading to various ailments that collectively were known as the "Poitou colic". By the end of the 17th century, most Poitou winemakers had stopped using lead in their wine production.

The Dutch also promoted the plantings of many white wine varieties that were in fashion through Europe. In regions like Muscadet, in the Loire Valley, the Dutch encouraged the planting of Melon de Bourgogne which produced more reliable harvest than the region's red wine varieties. The practice of blending different grape varieties from different areas was also influenced by the Dutch as a means of improving weaker wines or to adapt wines to changing public tastes. When the English developed tastes for stronger sweeter wines, the Dutch were the first to bulk up the Gascon claret wines with the wines of Cahors. Skilled engineers, the Dutch drained the marshy Medoc (left bank) region in the 17th century and began planting the region with vineyards. Prior to this time, Bordeaux's most sought-after wines came from the well-drained soil of the Graves region including the estate of Chateau Haut-Brion. By the end of the 17th century, with the aid of the Dutch, the future First Growth estates of Chateau Lafite, Latour and Margaux were planted and already starting to get notice abroad.

=== The Christian Church ===
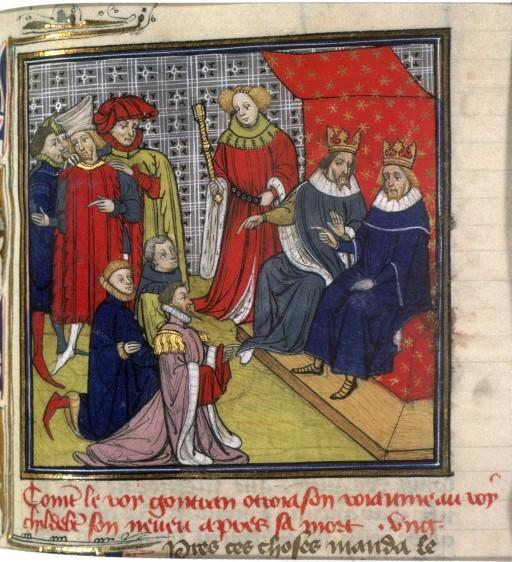
During the rule of the Merovingian kings, the seeds of monastic influence on French wine were planted as extensive tracts of vineyard lands were given to the church.

While there have been theories put forth that the Christian Church "saved" viticulture in France following the fall of the Roman Empire, the Germanic tribes that invaded the region were known to be fond of wine themselves leaving little evidence that viticulture and winemaking needed to be "saved" during this period. The Church, however, did become one of the most prominent and influential forces in French winemaking during the medieval period due to their vast holdings of vineyard lands. The Merovingian period of Frankish rule saw the early seeds of monastic influence on French wine when Guntram, Clovis' grandson, gave a vineyard to the abbey of St. Benignus at Dijon. In 630, the Abbey of Bèze near Gevrey received vineyards in Beaune, Gevrey and Vosnee as a gift from the duke of Lower Burgundy.

The reign of Charlemagne brought in a period of peace, stability and prosperity that helped foster the growth of the emerging wine regions of France. In 775 he gave the abbey of Saulieu a plot of land that bears his name today in the grand cru vineyard of Corton-Charlemagne. The spread of viticulture during Charlemagne's reign was fueled in part by the expansion of the Christian Church which needed a daily supply of wine for the sacrament of the Eucharist, the monks' personal consumption as well as for hospitality extended to guests. Important guests visiting the monasteries would be more likely to support the Church generously if they were entertained well during their stay. The extent of their holdings of vineyards and the quality of wine they produced became a status symbol for the bishops, putting them on par with the nobility. Some bishoprics even moved to be closer to their vineyard holdings, such as the bishopric of Saint-Quentin which moved to Noyon near Paris and the bishopric of Langres which moved to Dijon just north of the Côte-d'Or in Burgundy. The influence of Christianity helped to create two categories of wine in Medieval France-simple, basic wine meant for daily consumption and more superior, premium wine that was reserved for impressing important guests.

Various monastic orders became synonymous with certain wine regions due to their ownership of what is today considered some of most prized vineyards lands. The first group of monks to acquire vineyards on a large scale were the Benedictines of Cluny who came to own most of what is now Gevrey-Chambertin by 1273. In 1232, the abbey of St-Vivant received the vineyard lands now known as Romanee-Conti, Romanee-St-Vivant, Richebourg, La Romanee and La Tâche as a gift from the duchess of Burgundy. The Benedictines were also prominent vineyard owners with the wine produced in the abbey of St-Pourcain being one of the most highly regarded wines in medieval France. In the Loire Valley, the Benedictine monasteries in Bourgueil and La Charité extensively cultivated the lands around them while the abbey of St-Nicolas included large vineyards around Anjou. In Bordeaux, the Benedictines owned several properties including what became the modern classified estate of Chateau Prieure in Cantenac as well as the Graves estates of Chateau Carbonnieux. Other regions with Benedictine vineyards include Cornas and St-Peray in the Rhone as well six monastic estates in the Champagne region of Rheims.

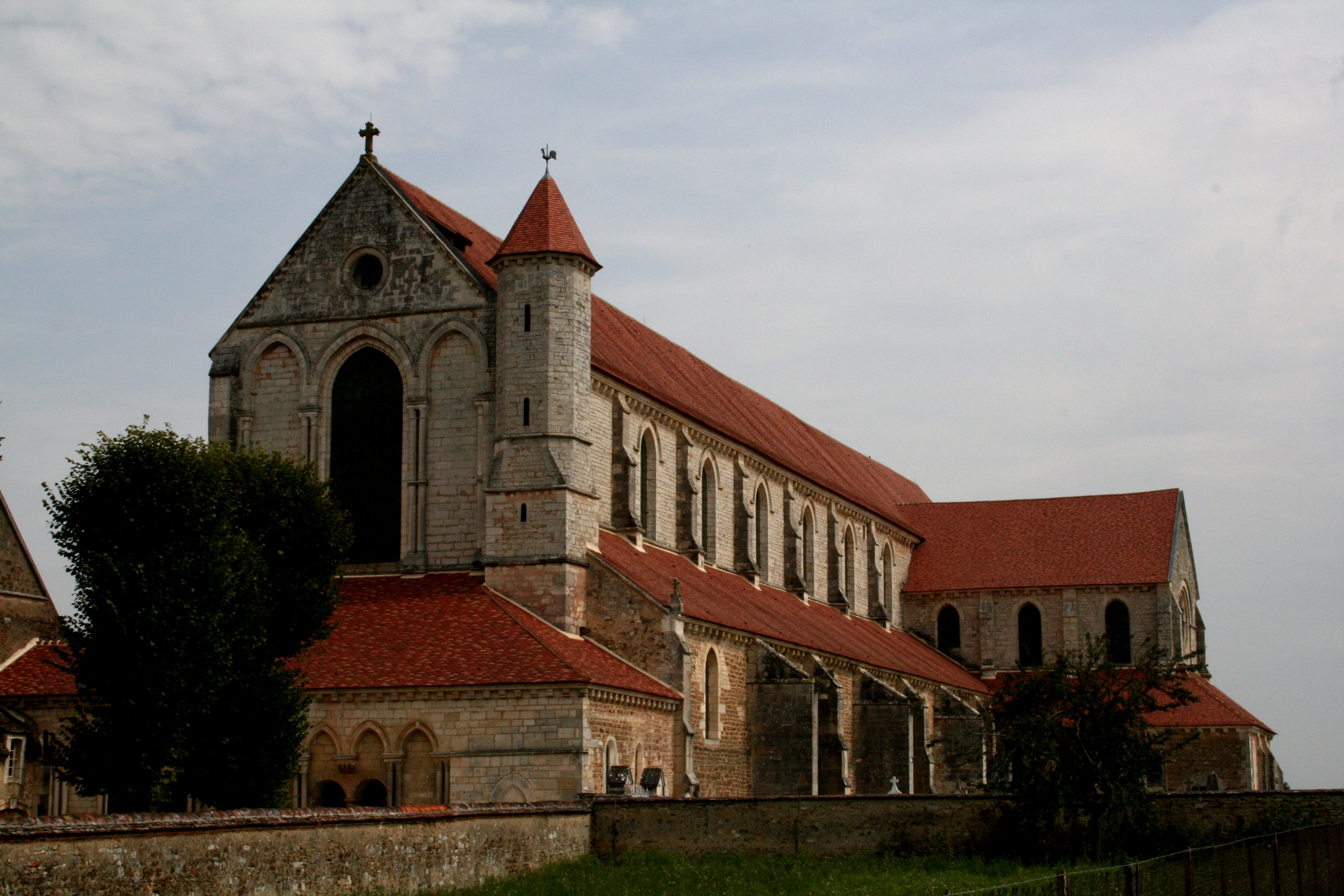
The vineyards owned by the Cistercian monks of the Pontigny Abbey is believed to have been one of the first areas in Chablis to be planted with Chardonnay.

One of the most famous holdings of the Cistercians was the walled vineyard of Clos de Vougeot but the extent of their lands included holdings in Beaune, Meursault, Pommard as well as Chablis where the Pontigny Abbey was believed to have been the first to plant Chardonnay in the region. Cistercian vineyards produced highly regarded wines in Provence and Sancerre. The Cistercian monks applied their ascetic habits, skilled labour and organization philosophy to wine making in a manner unique to French wine. Through their detailed record-keeping and observations, the monks began to notice that certain plots of lands, even those only a few feet apart, produced remarkably different wines. These observation laid the groundwork on the identification of certain "crus" of vineyards and the French understanding of terroir.

Through their extensive holdings, the monasteries of the Christian Church made many advances in French winemaking and viticulture with the study and observation of key vineyards sites, identifying the grape varieties that grew best in certain regions and discovering new methods of production. In 1531 it was a monk in the Languedoc region of Limoux that discovered the process of turning still wine into sparkling wine. Though the widespread tale of Dom Pérignon "inventing" the sparkling wine known as Champagne is inaccurate, the Benedictine monk nonetheless made several important contributions to the history of French wine. In 1668, Brother Pierre Perignon was appointed treasurer of the abbey of Hautvillers, located north of Épernay with his role including management of the abbey's vineyard holdings and the collection of tithes from the community in the form of grapes and wines. Dom Perignon took the wine from all these sources and blended them to produce a wine that fetched far higher prices than wines from other parts of Champagne. Perignon's practice of blending from several different vineyards was unique and largely unheard of till then. He also pioneered the practice of severe pruning in the vineyard to keep yields low.

== See also ==
- History of wine
- History of Champagne

== Works cited ==
- J. Robinson (ed) The Oxford Companion to Wine Third Edition pp. 281–83 Oxford University Press 2006 ISBN 0-19-860990-6.
