= Escadrille Spa.78 =

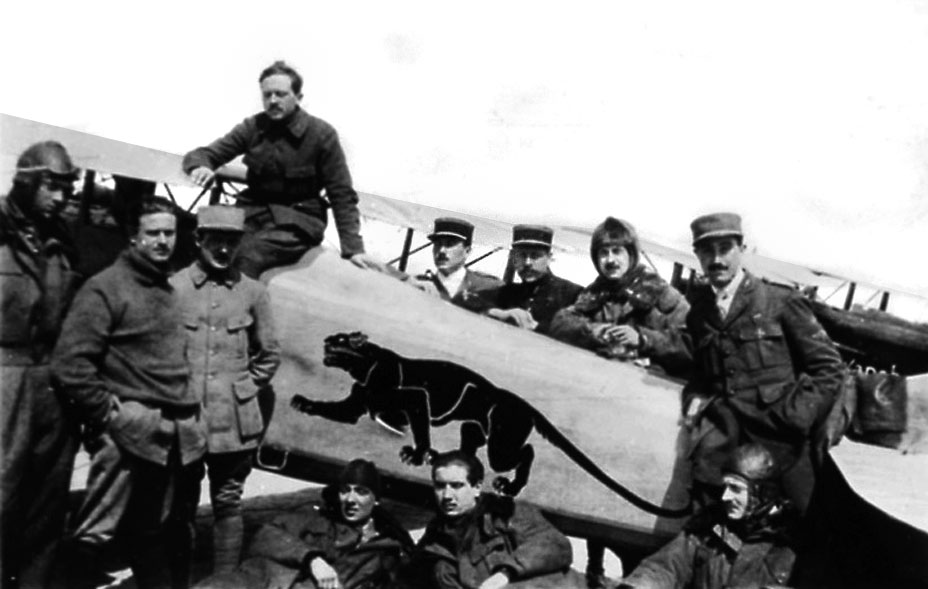
- Escadrille N 78, end of April 1917
- Active: 1916–1918
- Country: France
- Branch: French Air Service
- Type: Fighter Squadron

Escadrille Spa.78 (originally Escadrille N.78) was a French fighter squadron active from December 1916 until the end of World War I on 11 November 1918. It spent most of its existence as a component of a larger Groupe de Combat involved in offensive operations. The squadron was credited with a minimum of 40 confirmed aerial victories during the war.

== History ==
Escadrille N.78 was organized on 12 December 1916 at Saint Etienne-a-Temple, France. It was formed under the guidance of Lieutenant Armand Pinsard. On 17 March 1917, it was one of four squadrons combined into Groupe de Combat 15 in support of IV Armee. In the latter part of 1917, the squadron re-equipped with SPAD fighters, and renamed Escadrille Spa.78.

The squadron would fight as part of the Groupe until the Armistice on 11 November 1918. The Groupe would operate with various French field armies until 10 September 1918. It fought in support of the U.S. First Army until 28 September, when it passed to support of IV Armee. On 23 October 1918, it moved to its final assignment with V Armee.

Escadrille Spa.78 ended World War I credited with destruction of at least 40 German aircraft, with another 40 claims judged probable victories.

== Commanding officers ==
- Lieutenant Armand Pinsard: 12 December 1916wounded in action 12 July 1917
- Capitaine Eugene Verdon: 12 July 1917 - 25 September 1917
- Capitaine Gustave Lagache: 25 September 1917 - war's end

== Notable members ==
- Lieutenant Armand Pinsard
- Sous lieutenant Pierre Le Roy de Boiseaumarié, who later co-founded of the Institut national de l'origine et de la qualité (INAO).

== Aircraft ==
- Various types of Nieuport fighters: 12 December 1916 - late 1917
- SPAD fighters: Late 1917 - war's end
