= Pierre Le Roy de Boiseaumarié =

Pierre Gabriel Vincent Ernest Le Roy de Boiseaumarié
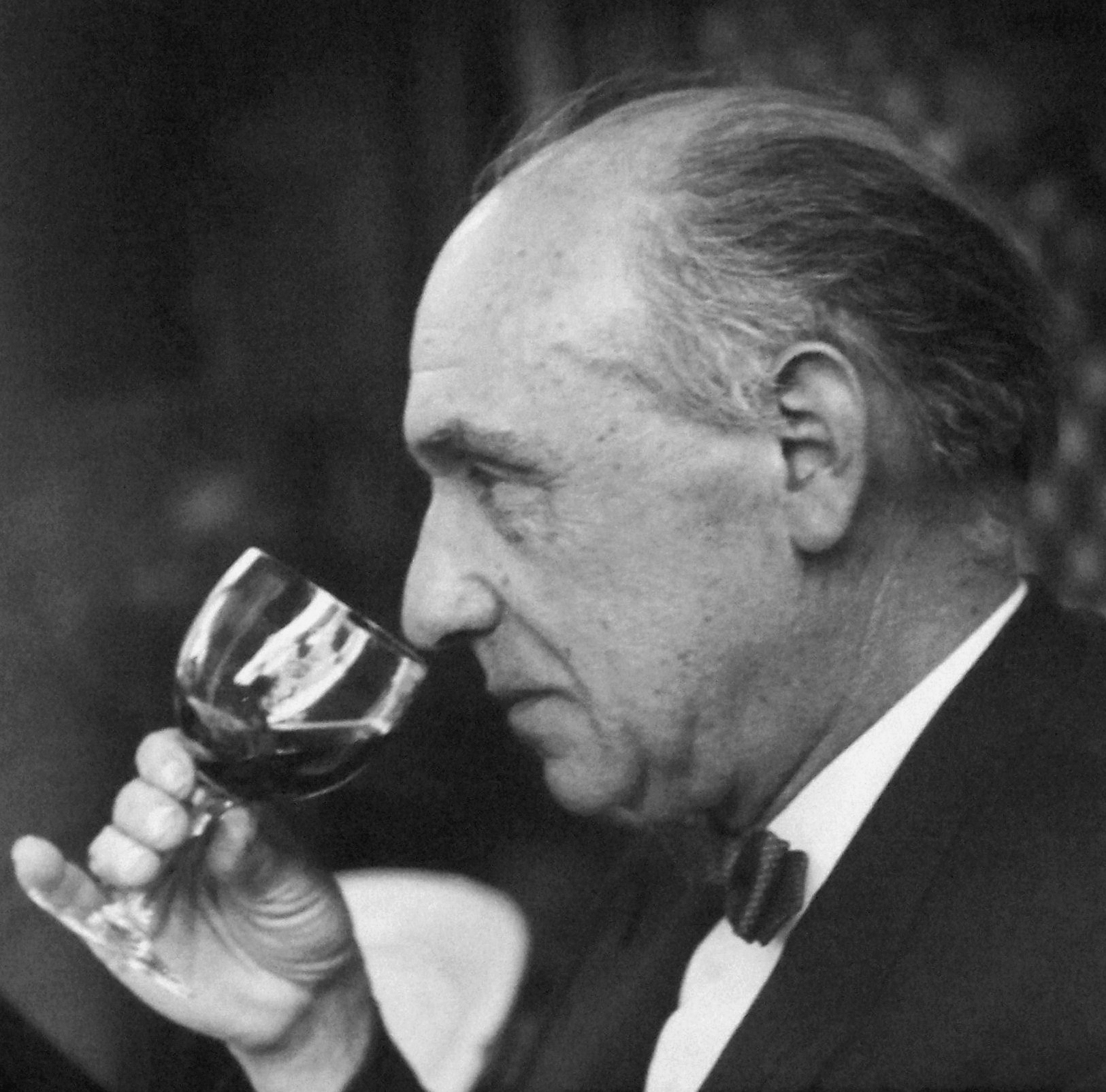
- Pierre Le Roy de Boiseaumarié tasting.
- Born: 5 April 1890; Mortagne-au-Perche, Orne, France
- Died: 16 June 1967 (aged 77); Chateauneuf du Pape, Vaucluse, France
- Occupations: lawyer and viticulturist
- Awards: Médaille militaire, Croix de Guerre, Légion d'honneur

Pierre Gabriel Vincent Ernest Le Roy de Boiseaumarié (French pronunciation: [pjɛʁ ɡabʁijɛl vɛ̃sɑ̃ ɛʁnɛst lə ʁwa də bwazomaʁje]; 1890-1967), nicknamed Baron Le Roy, was a World War I fighter pilot credited with five aerial victories.

He was the co-founder of the Institut National des Appellations d'Origine (INAO) and guided the creation of the Appellation d'origine contrôlée (AOC) system which is the basis of not only French wine laws but has also been influential in the laws and appellation systems across the globe.

== Life ==
Pierre Le Roy de Boiseaumarié (full name Pierre Marie Gabriel Le Roy de Boiseaumarié) was born on 5 April 1890 in Mortagne-au-Perche, Orne, Normandy.

His father was a cavalry officer who was decommissioned from the army for protesting again the law separating the church and the state. The family left their property in Mortagne-au-Perche and moved to Vendargues in the Hérault where they managed an estate producing wine. Le Roy studied law. On 9 June 1907 during the revolt of the Languedoc winegrowers Le Roy set fire to the door of the courthouse of Montpellier to prevent the troops who had been confined inside from shooting at the demonstrators.

Pierre Le Roy de Boiseaumarié began his mandatory military service on 10 October 1911. He began service as an infantryman, was transferred to artillery. On 21 February 1916, he began pilot training. He graduated with his Military Pilot's Brevet on 2 August 1916. After advanced training, he was posted to a fighter squadron, Escadrille N.78, on 19 February 1917. There he was promoted from the enlisted ranks to the rank of Sous lieutenant. While with this fighter squadron, he shot down two observation balloons and three enemy airplanes His fifth victory came on 7 June 1918; that same day, he was so seriously wounded that he had to be medically evacuated. On 17 August, he returned to his squadron; he was subsequently posted to Escadrille Spa.15. During the war, he was awarded the Médaille militaire, Croix de Guerre with three palmes, and the Légion d'honneur.

In 1919 he married Edmée Bernard Le Saint, heiress of the Château Fortia, one of the most prestigious wine producing estates in the village of Châteauneuf-du-Pape in the Vaucluse department of southern France. He became a prominent figure in not only the history of Châteauneuf-du-Pape but also in the history of French wine. In 1935 he and Joseph Capus co-founded the Institut National des Appellations d'Origine (INAO) and spearheaded the creation of the Appellation d'origine contrôlée (AOC) system that would become the basis of the French wine laws and continue to influence European wine laws into the twenty-first century.

He left a son and a daughter. His Breton ancestor had been created a baron by Napoleon, though he had been a royalist, and was involved in the British embassy in Paris.

== Distinctions ==
- Officier de la Légion d'Honneur
  - Chevalier de la Légion d'Honneur
- Médaille militaire
- Croix de Guerre 1914-1918 3 palms (mentioned in the Army Order)

== Posterity ==
Several streets bear his name: in Paris in the 12th arrondissement where rue Baron-Le-Roy was created during the reconstruction of Bercy, two in Occitania in Pujaut and, in Saint-Victor-la-Coste, and another one in Provence-Alpes-Côte d'Azur in Châteauneuf-du-Pape. A statue in his likeness was inaugurated in his presence in one of the squares of Sainte-Cécile-les-Vignes (Provence-Alpes-Côte d'Azur).

== Sources ==
- Pouget, Richard, Evènements Viticoles de 1907 (in French)

Information from his son and Barbara Whittingham-Jones, 'A Visit to Chateauneuf-du-Pape', Ridley's Wine & Spirit Trade Circular, 16 January 1952.
