= Selby Whittingham =

Selby Whittingham (born 8 August 1941 in Batu Gajah, Malaysia) is an art expert in London who has specialized in the work of J. M. W. Turner. Whittingham is a consultant to museums and institutions. He is the secretary and founder of The Independent Turner Society and is the author of a number of books about art and museums.

== Family ==
Whittingham was born in Batu Gajah, Malaysia. He was baptised Jeremy Selby Whittingham Oppenheim in 1941 in Malaya. His parents dropped the name "Oppenheim" in 1945 by deed poll due to anti-German feeling. His mother, Barbara Whittingham-Jones, worked in politics before the Second World War but later became a noted journalist. His father was Henry Rolf Oppenheim, a chartered accountant. Whittingham's uncle, Sir Duncan Oppenheim, besides his life in business, was an artist and Chairman of the Design Council and of the Royal College of Art as well as a member of the V&A Advisory Council.

== Education ==
Whittingham was educated at Shrewsbury School and Oriel College, Oxford, then at the University of Manchester. After Shrewsbury, he filled his gap year by attending the French Civilisation Course at the Sorbonne and by working as an assistant at the National Portrait Gallery at the invitation of the Director. At Oxford, he studied Mods and Greats of Literae Humaniores (classics). He graduated Ph.D. at the University of Manchester for a thesis on realism in medieval portraiture.

== Career and interest in Turner ==
It was as a young man that Selby began to take a special interest in J. M. W. Turner. His father had the same name as his ancestor, Henry Oppenheim, a neighbour of Benjamin Godfrey Windus, whose correspondence with Turner and John Ruskin Selby Whittingham discovered and published.

After Oxford, Whittingham was an assistant in the Conway Library at the Courtauld Institute of Art and then went to Manchester City Art Gallery as a trainee assistant for 2 years. He worked as a temporary assistant at the National Portrait Gallery and was then appointed assistant keeper at Manchester City Art Gallery in 1975. The same year he rejoined the staff of Manchester City Art Gallery. He then founded the Turner Society.

Whittingham was an admirer of Ruskin and involved with the fine collections of Turner watercolours at Manchester. Whittingham launched the proposal for a Turner Society to reunite the Turner Bequest in a separate Turner Gallery. Henry Moore became its president, and vice-presidents included the Earl of Harewood, John Piper, Victor Pasmore etc. Opposed were the museums (represented by Cecil Gould for the National Gallery, Andrew Wilton for the British Museum and Sir Norman Reid for the Tate). Whittingham considered that the original Turner Society had abandoned the aims for which it was founded - to reunite the whole Turner Bequest in a separate Turner Gallery -, so he created a new society, The Independent Turner Society.

Whittingham has published many studies relating to Turner's work and life. He has expressed a special interest in ensuring that the wishes that Turner expressed in his will are honoured.

Whittingham organised a Turner Symposium at the University of York in 1980 and an International Colloquium on Artists' Museums at the University of Paris in 1990). He was a guest curator for the Turner Museum in the United States, in 2009. He has worked closely with ArtWatch International and contributes often to the ArtWatchUK Journal and The Jackdaw. He was awarded Art Watch's Frank Mason Prize in 2011.

== Publications ==
Whittingham has published numerous works on J. M. W Turner.

His other publications include:

1. An Historical Account of the Will of J.M.W.Turner, R.A., 5 fascicules, 415 pp., Independent Turner Society, 2nd edition, 1993–1996;
2. The Fallacy of Mediocrity: The Need for a Proper Turner Gallery, 4 fascicules, Independent Turner Society, 1992;
3. English Watercolours and Drawings from the Manchester City Art Gallery, Thos. Agnew and Sons Ltd, October 1977, Catalogue by Selby Whittingham (nos 93-116 Turner watercolours);
4. Of Geese, Mallards and Drakes: Some Notes on Turner's Family, with contributions from others, Parts 1–4. 1. The Danbys, 1993, 138 pp.;The Turners of Devon, 1995, 134 pp.; Mrs Booth of Margate, 1996, 144 pp.; The Marshalls & Harpurs, 1999, 290 pp., in 2 fascicules, Independent Turner Society, 1993–1999.
5. The World Directory of Artists' Museums, Lists some 500 museums, houses, monuments, libraries, including those which no longer exist, 148 pp., Independent Turner Society, 1995;
6. Ruskin's Guide to the Turners in the Clore Gallery, Ed. With Robert Walmsley, Independent Turner Society;
7. 'Turner, Ruskin and Constable at Salisbury', The Burlington Magazine, CXIII, May 1971, pp. 272–5
8. A Vision of the First Proper National 'Turner's Gallery', Independent Turner Society, 2007;
9. Ruskin as Turner's Executor, Essay and documents, 70 pp., Independent Turner Society, 1995;
10. Turner Exhibited 1856–61, Critique of the Turner Bequest pictures, 1856–61, 78 pp., Independent Turner Society, 1995;
