= Law of 6 May 1919 relating to the Protection of Appellations of Origin =

French intellectual property law

The Law of 6 May 1919 relating to the Protection of Appellations of Origin (loi du 6 mai 1919 relative à la protection des appellation d'origine) is a French intellectual property law protecting geographical indications of the origins of products, particularly of wine and spirits. It is not the earliest such law but is probably the most influential, as it instituted the well-known system of appellations d'origine contrôlées. As such it laid the base for the protection of geographical indications across Europe. It now forms Title II of Book VII of the French Intellectual Property Code, where it is considered a special form of trademark law.

== General protection ==
The first part of the law creates both civil and criminal actions against false appellations applied to natural or manufactured products. An appellation may be false if it misstates the origin of the product or if it is applied contrary to "local, loyal and constant usage", in effect a quality clause. The criminal penalties (Art. 8) are three to twelve months imprisonment and 100 to 2000 francs fine.

== Protection of wines and spirits ==
Wines and spirits in general, and champagne in particular, receive special protection under the law. The geographical indications associated with wines and spirits cannot become genericized or otherwise fall into the public domain (Art. 10). A system of registration is implemented to follow the production from the vineyard through to wholesalers. The producers of spirits under an appellation of origin or of champagne must store their production separately from any production which does not qualify for an appellation of origin.
