= Joseph Capus =

French politician (1867–1947)

Joseph Marie Capus
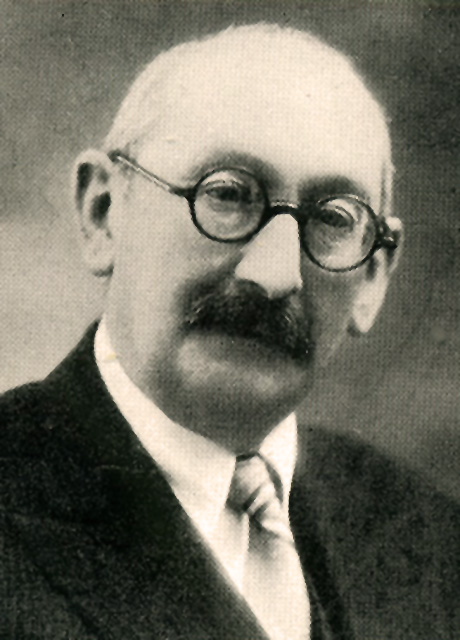
- Capus in 1919

Minister of Agriculture
- In office 29 March 1924 – 13 June 1924
- Preceded by: Henry Chéron
- Succeeded by: Henri Queuille

Personal details
- Born: 18 August 1867 Marseille, France
- Died: 1 May 1947 (aged 79) Paris, France
- Occupation: Agriculturalist

Joseph Marie Capus (French: [kapy]; 18 August 1867 – 1 May 1947) was a French agriculturalist and expert on grape vines. He became a deputy in the French national parliament, and was Minister of Agriculture for a few months in 1924. He was active in legislation related to agriculture and was the driving force behind introduction of the Appellation d'origine contrôlée for French wines.

== Early years ==
Joseph Marie Capus was born on 18 August 1867 in Marseille. His father was a lawyer in Marseille and his mother, who died while he was a child, was the daughter of a notary from Vaucluse. His brother Alfred Capus, ten years his senior, was a writer who became editor of Le Figaro. Capus studied at the Lycée Condorcet in Marseille, the École de Grignon, the École Pratique d'Ondes and the École Pratique de Cézany. He became a professor of agriculture at Cadillac, Gironde. He was appointed director of the Cadillac station of plant diseases from 1900, and in 1915 became director of the agricultural station of the Gironde.

Capus undertook important studies on diseases of the vine, particularly black-rot and mildew. He set up the first meteorological warning station to warn farmers of approach of diseases that could threaten their crops. He studied grafting of vines, and developed the procedure known as "Cadillac grafting". In 1918 the Academy of Sciences gave him the Montagnac prize.

== Political career ==
Capus ran for election to parliament on 16 November 1919 on the Republican Union platform, and was elected deputy for the Gironde. He was very active as a deputy on questions related to agriculture. He was appointed Minister of Agriculture on 29 March 1924 in the third cabinet of Raymond Poincaré, He was reelected deputy for the Gironde in the general elections of 11 May 1924 on the Republican Concentration platform. He left the ministry when the Poincaré government resigned on 1 June 1924. He was again Minister of Agriculture in the cabinet formed the next day by Frédéric François-Marsal, but this lasted only one day. Capus returned to the chamber and resumed his contributions on agriculture issues.

Capus was a friend of Jean-Raoul Paul, director of the Compagnie du Midi and owner of a vineyard in Vayres. On 3 January 1926 Capus and Paul founded the wine-making syndicate of Graves and Vayres to combine the winegrowers of this Bordeaux wine region in order to protect them against competition. In 1927 Capus was elected Chairman of the Committee on Agriculture. He ran unsuccessfully for election in the 7th district of Bordeaux in the general elections of 22/29 April 1928. He was elected to the Senate in a by-election on 2 February 1930, and was re-elected on 15 October 1932. He was a member of the committee on Customs and Trade Agreements from 1931 to 1936, and the committee on Foreign Affairs from 1934 to 1940. In 1935 he submitted the draft law, approved on 30 July 1935, that created appellations d'origine. During World War II (1939–45), on 10 July 1940 he voted to give Marshal Philippe Pétain the power to form a new government in Vichy.

== Last years ==
Capus retired from the Senate after voting for Pétain and was appointed President of the Comité national des vins à appellation d'origine contrôlée (National Committee of Wines of Controlled Origin). He held this office when he died on 1 May 1947 in Paris. He was a Knight of the Legion of Honour, a member of the Academy of Agriculture and of the Academy of Bourdeaux.

== Appellations d'Origine Contrôlée ==
The French "appellations d'origine" (designation of origin) for wine at first just indicated where the wine had been made, with no restrictions on the types of grape used or the way the wine was made. They reduced fraud but had little effect on quality. In 1906 Capus spoke at a congress of the Société des Viticulteurs de France in which attendees tried to describe the distinctive qualities of the wines from their regions. Capus represented growers of the Gironde, and when he spoke made the case for adding "controllée" (controlled) to "appellation d'origine". In his view the existing system, which simply identified the place of origin of the wine, was unable to prevent fraud. To confirm a wine's origin the authorities would have to taste it and analyze the chemical composition, and for this to work there had to be standards defining the types of grape used, yield, purity and content of alcohol. The attendees almost unanimously rejected the proposal as an intolerable interference.

Some years later, Pierre Le Roy de Boiseaumarié insisted on tighter regulations in Châteauneuf-du-Pape, and Capus then worked to ensure that quality controls for the appellations were introduced throughout France. Le Roy de Boiseaumarié wanted to establish the framework within which a great vineyard could develop, while Capus wanted to protect wine areas that had earned a reputation for quality. Both thought the label on a wine bottle should indicate the type of wine and the way it had been made, not just the region.

When Capus introduced his first bill to define appellation in this way in 1925 there was considerable debate. The makers of the best wines favored quality rules, but most winemakers did not. The law eventually passed in 1927 was a compromise. The legislation required that vinters follow "best practices" in growing grapes and making wine, with the civil courts ruling in case of disputes. However, "best practices" is a poorly defined concept and the courts often took the side of the large winemakers, so quality did not automatically improve. Some progress was made in 1930, when the industry faced a crisis of declining consumption coupled with increased production. Édouard Barthe of the Hérault department, leader of the wine lobby in parliament, formed an alliance with the deputies who represented regions where fine wines were grown to pass legislation that increased state control of the industry.

On 30 July 1935 Capus obtained passage of the law that originated the Appellation d'origine contrôlée (AOC). Under this law the Comité National des appellations d'origine (CNAO) was given the sole authority to rule on matters related to the quality of wine. The members of the committee included delegates of ministries of agriculture, finance and justice and presidents of viticulture syndicates. They consulted with the top wine producers in each region to define the boundaries of appellations and the rules for a wine to qualify. The CNAO was funded by a fee paid by the producers. Many small wine producers were eager to escape the state regulations imposed on bulk winemakers, and sought to join. However the CNAO enforced high standards and the percentage of French wine designated as AOC actually declined in the first years after the CNAO was formed. After World War II the committee became the public-private Institut National des Appellations d'Origine (INAO). The regulations became a model for other European countries.

== Selected publications ==
- Joseph Capus. Observations sur l'Anthracnose maculée; les invasions de black-rot et de mildiou en 1905.
- Joseph Capus (1906). Les invasions de black rot et de mildiou en 1905: communication présentée à l'Assemblée générale du Comice de Cadillac, le 5 novembre 1905. imprimerie J. Laburthe. p. 16.
- Joseph Capus (1909). Eudémis et Cochylis: moeurs et traitements. Ch. Amat.
- Joseph Capus (1919). Traitement des maladies de la vigne: black rot, mildiou, oïdium, pourriture grise, anthracnose. Féret & fils. p. 40.
- Louis de Vogüé; Pierre Jules Joseph de Monicault de Villardeau; Joseph Capus (1922). L'agriculture et l'impôt. Société des agriculteurs de France. p. 35.
- Joseph Capus (1930). Comment combattre le mildiou de la vigne, par M. Joseph Capus. impr. Hémery, 18, rue d'Enghien; 'le petit Parisien'. p. 8.
- Joseph Capus. Examen de la loi du 2 décembre 1940 sur l'organisation corporative de l'agriculture.
- Joseph Capus (1941). L'assainissement du marché des vins par le contrôle des appellations d'origines: une expérience corporative. Poulet-Malassis. p. 18.
- Joseph Capus (1942-04-29). La réceptivité de la vigne à l'égard du Mildiou. Communication to the Academy of Agriculture.
- Louis Larmat; Joseph Capus; Roger Descas; Pierre baron Le Roy de Boiseaumarié (1943). Atlas de la France vinicole... l'auteur. p. 24.
- Germain Lafforgue; Joseph Capus; Georges Chappaz (1947). Le Vignoble girondin. Le Moil et Pascaly. p. 324.
- Joseph Capus (1947). J. Capus,... L'Évolution de la législation sur les appellations d'origine. Genèse des appellations contrôlées. Le Moil et Pascaly. p. 82.
- Joseph Capus. L'œuvre du Comité national des appellations d'origine des vins et eaux-de-vie.
- Joseph Capus. Traitement des maladies de la vigne.
- Joseph Capus. Le régime corporatif dans l'Europe moderne; Aperçu sur la corporation agricole en France.

== Sources ==
- Bouneau, Christine (1998). "CAPUS Joseph, Marie 1867-1947". Dictionnaire des parlementaires d'Aquitaine sous la Troisième République (in French). Presses Univ de Bordeaux. ISBN 978-2-86781-231-6.
- Colman, Tyler (2008-07-14). Wine Politics: How Governments, Environmentalists, Mobsters, and Critics Influence the Wines We Drink. University of California Press. ISBN 978-0-520-93473-3.
- Jolly, Jean (1977). "Joseph CAPUS". Dictionnaire des parlementaires français de 1889 à 1940 (in French).
- "Joseph CAPUS" (in French). Ministère de l’agriculture, de l’agroalimentaire et de la forêt. 2012-08-31.
- Loubère, Leo A. (2014-07-14). The Wine Revolution in France: The Twentieth Century. Princeton University Press. ISBN 978-1-4008-6116-3.
- Lukacs, Paul (2013-10-21). Inventing Wine: A New History of One of the World's Most Ancient Pleasures: A New History of One of the World's Most Ancient Pleasures. W. W. Norton. ISBN 978-0-393-23964-5.
