= Barbara Whittingham-Jones =

British politician and writer (1907-58)

(Mary Edith) Barbara Whittingham-Jones, later Oppenheim (1907-1958), was a British politician, historian and journalist. She spent some time living in Malaya, and became known for her writing on Malaya in the late 1940s.

== Life ==
Whittingham-Jones was the daughter of the Revd Edward Evan Whittingham-Jones and Edith Muriel, the daughter of Walter Robert Taylor, a paint manufacturer of Liverpool and London. As a teenager, she stayed with a French family at the Château du Grésil near Rouen, then at Heidelberg ("The Adopted Son", Blackwood's Magazine, January 1951). She was educated at Huyton College and Newnham College, Cambridge, and studied for the Bar at Gray's Inn. She was called to the Bar on 17 June 1931, but abandoned the law for politics.

In the mid-1930s, she supported Randolph Churchill's unsuccessful efforts to stand as an Independent Conservative parliamentary candidate in Liverpool constituencies (contesting the 1935 Liverpool Wavertree by-election, and in the 1935 general election for the Liverpool West Toxteth constituency). In 1936 she wrote a series of pamphlets criticising the sectarianism of the Liverpool Conservatives under its 'boss' Sir Thomas White, which she described as a 'tripod of religious bigotry, class jealousy and caucus formation'.

In 1936 she stood unsuccessfully as a Conservative City Councillor in Croxteth. At the end of the decade she established the Progressive Democratic Union in Liverpool, and as its chair, she criticised Britain's 'nerveless foreign policy' in July 1939, calling for Winston Churchill to be prime minister.

In 1940 Whittingham-Jones married Henry Rolf Oppenheim (1902–87). Their child, art expert Selby Whittingham, was born in Malaya in 1941. The family's escape from Singapore in February 1942 is related in her husband's diary (typescript at Cambridge University Library). In the aftermath of the war, her 1946 article 'Malaya Betrayed' caused a sensation in Malaya. In September 1947 she was the first British correspondent to visit the Patani district. She carried out an effective propaganda campaign supporting Tengku Mahmood Mahyideen and the claims of Malay Muslims of Patani. She reported on the lead-up to Indonesian independence for The Observer and Far Eastern Review, whose parliamentary correspondent she became. She was a member of the Royal Asiatic Society.

In the 1950s she embarked on a series of books, starting with a study of Shakespeare's plays, and embracing a study of the royal succession in the 15th century and the history of Southwark and its Shakespeare festival; they remained incomplete at her death. She lived at 1 Scarsdale Villas, Kensington, where the previous occupant was Lady Benson; Sir Frank Benson inspired her early love of Shakespeare. (She failed to get a blue plaque erected to them, but one has now been to Michael Flanders and Donald Swann, who lived in the studio at the back which Lady Benson used for her drama school. Swann was a lodger at no.1 for a short period before he married his first wife.) The first recording of 'At the Drop of a Hat' mentions Mrs Oppenheim as a neighbour.

Whittingham-Jones died suddenly on 28 November 1958 while flying from London to Gibraltar. Her papers are held at the School of Oriental and African Studies. In the 1930s she had collected material for a historical book on Liverpool politics, and after her death some of this material was published in the Transactions of the Historic Society of Lancashire and Cheshire. Her papers relating to Liverpool politics in 1930s are held by her son Dr Selby Whittingham.

== Works ==
- The Pedigree of Liverpool Politics: White, Orange & Green. [Liverpool], 1936.
- More about Liverpool Politics: Red Flag, Rome and Shamrock, 1936.
- Down with the Orange Caucus!. [Liverpool], 1936.
- China Fights in Britain. A factual survey of a fascinating colony in our midst. London: W.H. Allen & Co, 1944.
- 'The works of Maurice Collis', Asiatic Review, Vol. 41 (July 1945), pp. 298–300
- 'Malaya Betrayed', World Review, May 1946
- 'Patani – Malay State outside Malaya', The Straits Times, October 30, 1947.
- 'The new Malaya', Spectator, No. 6240 (January 30, 1949), pp. 126–7
- 'Moslem Community in Siam Oppressed by Buddhist Rulers. Patani Isolated', Scotsman, March 22, 1948.
- 'Patani Appeals to UNO', Eastern World, Vol. 2, No. 4 (April 1948)
- 'Spindrift of an Asian tour – II. Burma', The Asiatic Review. Vol. 44 (April 1948), pp. 212–219.
- 'Independent Indonesia', Contemporary Review, Vol. 178 (February 1950), pp. 87–91
- 'The Strangers Gallery', The Quarterly Review, 1951
- Electioneering in Lancashire before secret ballot: II Liverpool’s political clubs, 1812-1830, Transactions of the Historic Society of Lancashire and Cheshire, Vol. 3, 1959, pp. 117–138
- 'The Dugdale Shakespeare', The Quarterly Review, 1964
