= Henri Marès =

French agronomist

Henri Marès (18 January 1820 – 9 May 1901) was a French agronomist.

Mares was born in Chalon-sur-Saone, France, in 1820. He went to school in Montpellier, and later studied in Paris. In the 1850's, Mares developed a method of using sulphur to treat mildew on vines.
