= Appellation d'origine contrôlée =

French protected geographic appellation

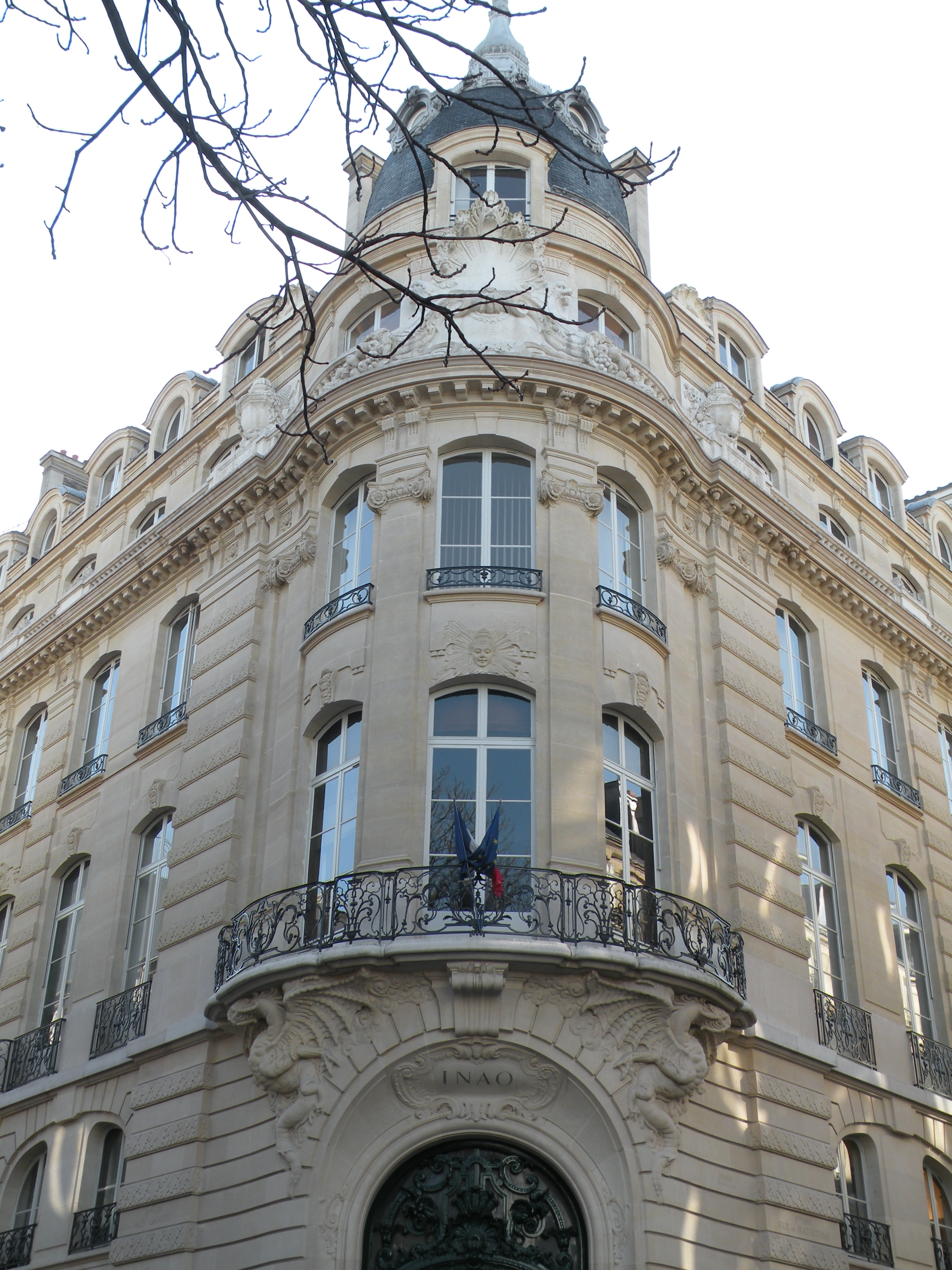
Headquarters of the Institut national de l'origine et de la qualité in Paris

In France, the label appellation d'origine contrôlée (French pronunciation: [apɛlasjɔ̃ dɔʁiʒin kɔ̃tʁole], lit. 'controlled designation of origin'; abbr. AOC [a.o.se]) identifies an agricultural product whose stages of production and processing are carried out in a defined geographical area – the terroir – and using recognized and traditional production methods. The specificity of an AOC product is determined by the combination of a physical and biological environment with established production techniques transmitted within a human community. Together, these give the product its distinctive qualities.

The defining technical and geographic factors are set forth in standards for each product, including wines, cheeses and meats. Other countries and the European Union have similar labeling systems. The European Union's protected designation of origin (PDO and PGI) system has harmonized the protection of all geographical indications and their registration. When labelling wine however, producers may still use recognized traditional terms like AOC, and are not required to display the PDO and PGI logos or terms, mostly for aesthetic reasons.

== How the labeling system works ==
The AOC certification of authenticity is granted to certain geographical indications for wines, cheeses, butters, and other agricultural products by the Institut national de l'origine et de la qualité (INAO). The certification system is designed to protect distinctive and traditional regional products, based upon the concept of terroir. Terroir refers to a given geographical area having specific environmental and human features that affect an agricultural product's key characteristics. These factors are meant to capture unique environmental features (e.g. type of soil, topology of the production environment, local climate) and farming and processing practices (e.g. the steps taken and inputs used in producing a specific type of cheese). Thus, it includes the traditional savoir-faire that goes into the production of AOC products. Taken together, these give the product its distinctive qualities.

The terroirs of AOCs vary dramatically in size. Some cover vast expanses with a variety of climatic and soil conditions, while others are small and highly uniform. For example, the Côtes du Rhône AOC covers some 75,000 acres (about 30,000 hectares) and 171 villages, making it one of the largest AOCs. However, within its area lies one of the smallest AOCs, Château-Grillet, which occupies less than 4 hectares (9.9 acres) of land.

The INAO's mission is to ensure that all AOC products are held to a rigorous set of clearly defined standards; they are to be produced in a consistent and traditional manner with ingredients from specifically classified producers in designated geographical areas. The products must also be aged at least partially in the respective designated area.

Under French law, it is illegal to manufacture and sell a product under one of the AOC-controlled geographical indications if it does not comply with the criteria of the AOC. In order to make them easily recognizable, all AOC products carry a seal. The seal displays a number as well as the name of the certifying body. The color of the seal indicates the product classification: green for field products and red for dairy products.

To prevent any possible misrepresentation, no part of an AOC name may be used on a label of a product not qualifying for that AOC. This strict label policy can lead to confusion, especially where towns share names with appellations. If the town of origin of a product contains a controlled appellation in its name, the producer (who is legally required to identify the place of origin on the product label but legally prohibited from using the full town's name unless the product is an approved AOC product) is enjoined from listing anything more than a cryptic postal code. For example, there are a dozen townships in l'Aude that have Cabardès in their names, several of which are not even within the geographical boundaries of the Cabardès AOC. Any vineyard that produces wine in one of those towns must not mention the name of the town of origin on the product labels.

== History ==
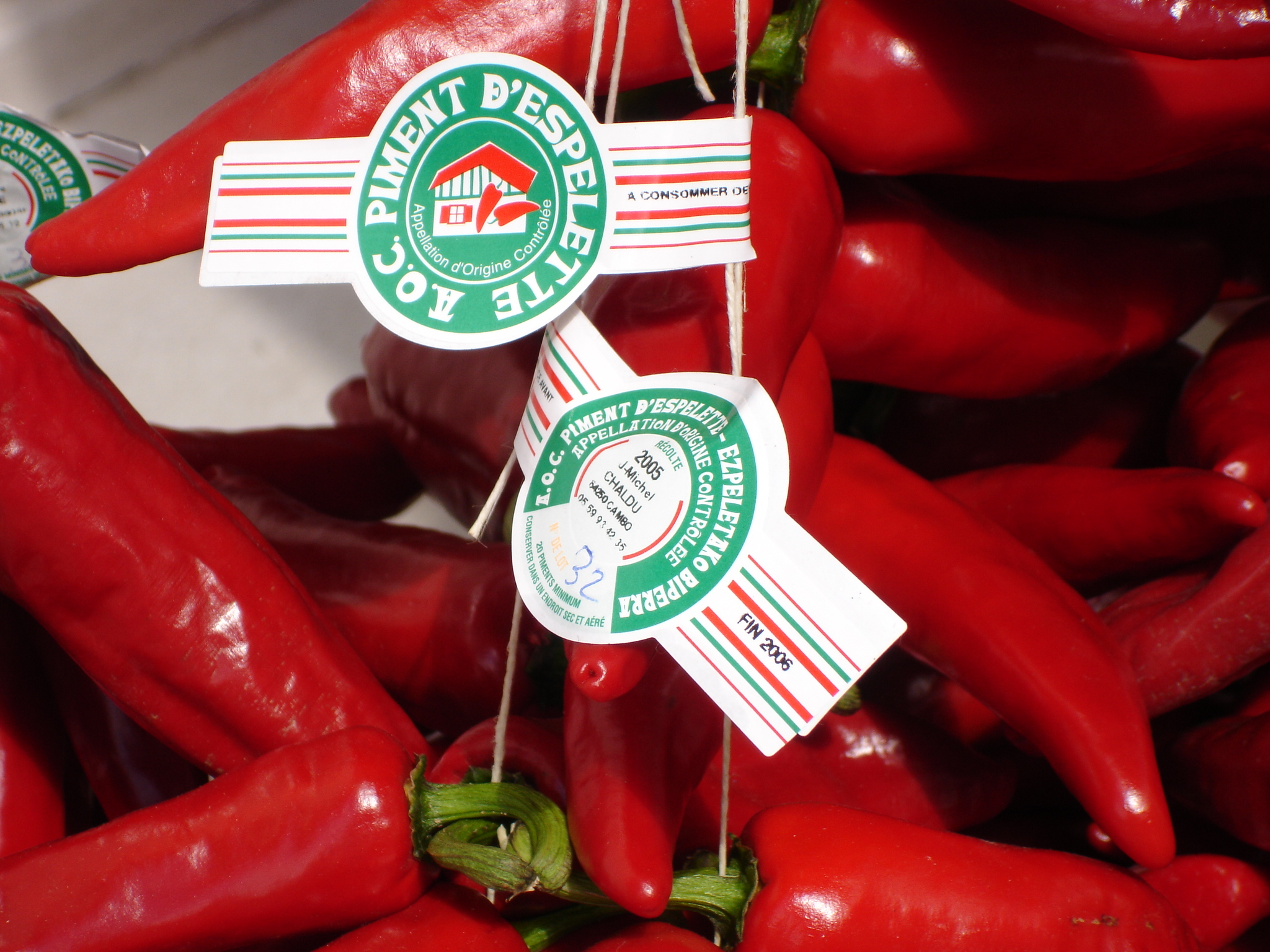
Peppers with AOC of Espelette

The origins of AOC date to 1411, when the production of blue Roquefort cheese was regulated by parliamentary decree. The first French law determining viticultural designations of origin dates to the 1 August 1905, and, on 6 May 1919, the Law for the Protection of the Place of Origin was passed, specifying the region and commune in which a given product must be manufactured. This law has since been revised many times.

On 30 July 1935, the Comité National des appellations d'origine (CNAO) was created by representatives of the government and the major winegrowers to manage the administration of the AOC process for wines at the initiative of Joseph Capus. In the Rhône wine region Baron Pierre Le Roy Boiseaumarié, a trained lawyer and winegrower from Châteauneuf-du-Pape, successfully obtained legal recognition of the "Côtes du Rhône" appellation of origin in 1936.

After World War II the Committee became the public-private Institut National des Appellations d'Origine (INAO). The AOC seal was created and mandated by French laws in the 1950s, 1960s and 1970s. On 2 July 1990, the scope of work of the INAO was extended beyond wines to cover other agricultural products.

== Product coverage ==
=== Wine ===
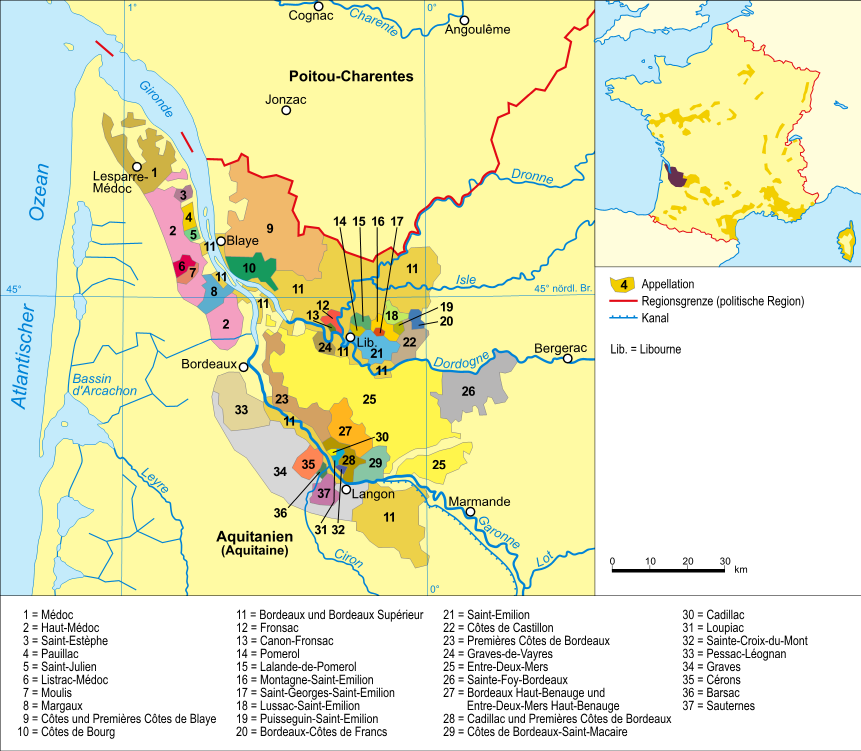
Bordeaux wine map (click to enlarge)

Over 300 French wines are entitled to the display the AOC seal on their label. Wines still may use this label, despite classification under EU and UK law as Protected Designation of Origin. In 2018, 47% of the wines produced in France were wines with a controlled designation of origin.

Legislation concerning the way vineyards are identified makes recognizing the various AOCs very challenging for wine drinkers not accustomed to the system. Often, distinguishing classifications requires knowledge of esoteric label laws such as "Unless the wine is from a Premier Cru vineyard, the vineyard name must be printed in characters no more than half the height of the ones used for the village name."

On the other hand, while the process of label approval is enforced to the millimetre, the quality control for the wine in the bottle is less strict. A blind taster must approve the wine for it to receive AOC classification, but this tasting often occurs before the product is even bottled, and by a local expert who may well have ties to the local vintners. Even if the taster is objective, the wine sample may not be representative of the actual product, and there is almost no way to verify that the finished bottled product is the same as the original AOC sample.

=== Cheese ===
In 1925, Roquefort became the first cheese to be awarded an AOC label, and since then over 40 cheeses have been assigned AOC status. They generally are also classified as Protected Designations of Origin under EU law, and thus use the PDO/AOP logo, rather than the AOC logo.

=== Other products ===
- Meat: On 15 August 1957, the National Assembly gave AOC status to the poultry of Bresse (Poulet de Bresse). In 2006, it awarded AOC status to salt marsh lamb raised in the Bay of the Somme. In September of the same year, the INAO validated the Fin gras du Mézenc.
- Lavender oil: In 1981, the AOC label was given to Haute-Provence Lavender Essential Oil. It refers to a very high-quality production and concerns only the essential oil of fine lavender - Lavandula angustifolia. The fields must be located within a specific territory at a minimum altitude of 800 meters. This geographic area covers 284 communities in the Alpes-de-Haute-Provence, Hautes-Alpes, Drôme and Vaucluse regions.
- Lentils from Le Puy-en-Velay have AOC status as well as PDO-status as Lentille verte du Puy.
- Honey from the island of Corsica has been given AOC status. There are six certified varietals of Corsican honey: Printemps, Maquis de printemps, Miellats du maquis, Châtaigneraie, Maquis d'été, and Maquis d'automne.
- Butter: France recognizes the Charente, Charente-Maritime, Vienne, Deux-Sèvres and Vendée AOC regions for butter. The Beurre Charentes-Poitou was accorded AOC status in 1979 and PDO status in 1996 as Beurre Charentes-Poitou / Beurre des Charentes / Beurre des Deux-Sèvres.
- Spirits: Armagnac, Calvados, Cognac and Martinique Rhum agricole all have AOC status.

== Other countries' labels ==
=== European Union ===
EU law has created a similar type of protection for regional products called the AOP (appellation d'origine protégée; or, in English, Protected designation of origin, PDO). This protection recognizes products that are the "result of a unique combination of human and environmental factors that are characteristic of a given territory."

Most products with an AOC designation also have a protected designation of AOP under EU law. For those products, only the EU PDO/AOP designation can be used. However, wines with a PDO/AOP status can still use the French AOC designation.

After Brexit, all geographic indications already established under EU law as of 31 December 2020 are also recognized under UK law, according to Article 54, paragraph 2 of the withdrawal treaty.

=== Other EU countries ===
Many other countries have based their controlled place name systems on the French AOC classification. Italy's Denominazione di Origine Controllata and Denominazione di Origine Controllata e Garantita followed the model set by the French AOC, and the EU standard for Quality Wines Produced in Specified Regions (QWpsr) also corresponds closely.

While Spain's denominación de origen is very similar, the classification of Rioja in 1925 and Sherry in 1933 preceded the French AOC system by a few years and show that Spain's DdO system developed parallel to France's AOC system to some extent. Similarly, Germany's Qualitätswein bestimmter Anbaugebiete is a wine classification system based on geographic region, but it differs from the AOC in important ways. Qualitätswein bestimmter Anbaugebiete wines are commonly seen as less prestigious than Qualitätswein mit Prädikat, making it more similar to the Vin de Pays or Vin Délimité de Qualité Supérieure systems.

Portugal's Denominação de Origem Controlada, Austria's Districtus Austria Controllatus, South Africa's Wine of Origin, and Switzerland's AOC-IGP are all similar to the French AOC system as well.

=== Switzerland ===
Switzerland has an appellation d'origine contrôlée certification for wines and an appellation d'origine protégée certification for other food products.

=== South Africa ===
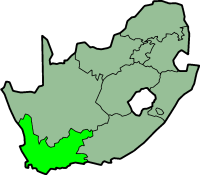
Although the majority of South Africa's wine regions lie in the Western Cape, recent pioneering efforts have included the Eastern Cape and KwaZulu-Natal as wine regions.

Drafted in 1973, the "Wine of Origin" (WO) programme legislates how wine regions of South Africa are defined and can appear on wine labels. While some aspects of the WO are taken from the French Appellation d'Origine Contrôlée (AOC) system, the WO is concerned primarily with accuracy in labelling and does not place any additional regulations on wine regions such as permitted varieties, trellising methods, irrigation and crop yields. Wine regions under the WO system fall under one of four categories – the largest and most generic are geographical units (such as the Western Cape region) which include the smaller, but still largely defined regions (such as Overberg), followed by districts (like Walker Bay) and then finally wards (such as Elgin). The Eastern Cape province is South Africa's most recent wine region. While geographical units, regions and districts are largely defined by political boundaries – wards are the level of origin designation that is most defined by unique terroir characteristics.

=== United States ===
The United States' American Viticultural Areas also follows the model set by the French AOC. The United States Department of the Treasury's Alcohol and Tobacco Tax and Trade Bureau even uses the legal terminology "Appellation of Wine Origin" to describe a vintage wine's location of origin. The AVA indication on a label indicates that 85% of the grapes for wine are grown in the designated AVA. Overall, the appellation of a wine simply says where the grapes are from, although there are some particularities. If the appellation is a state, 100% of the grapes which go into the wine must come from the specific state. If a winery gets grapes from a neighboring state (for example, a California vintner getting Pinot noir from Oregon), it may label the wine "Oregon", but if the state is not a neighboring one (for example, a California vintner getting Cabernet from Washington state), the only permitted appellation is "American".

=== Canada ===
In Canada, there is a government-sanctioned wine standard called Vintners Quality Alliance (VQA). It only applies to Canadian wines, and only the provinces of Ontario and British Columbia regulate it.

== International trade issues ==
The protections afforded by the AOC status may not be available in foreign markets. Part of the problem arises from the fact that European migrants to various countries marketed food products under the names referring to the places they came from (e.g. Parmesan, Rioja). After many years, such names became simply generic names for food products. Thus, products which are labelled AOC in France or AOP in the European Union may compete in international markets with foreign products that refer to a geographical origin that has nothing to do with where the product is produced (e.g. Parmesan that is produced in the United States and not in a narrowly defined region of northern Italy).

In such cases, bilateral agreements with other countries, whereupon the signatories agree to accord a special status to a list of designated products. The Comprehensive Economic and Trade Agreement between Canada and the European Union is an example.

Since each country has its own legal and agricultural framework, the specifics of each trade relationship are likely to vary. Also, there are often conflicts between trademarks and geographical indications. For instance, in Canada, only Canadian wines can be VQA approved but other certification trademarks can be registered under the intellectual property regime. The owner of a certification trademark is then allowed to sell licences to be used for certain products meeting the owner's criteria. Thus in the case of wines, one AOC certification trademark is owned by the French Republic, while another is owned by Maison des Futailles, a wine producer, of which the publicly owned Société des alcools du Québec is a partner.

== See also ==
- Appellation (wine)
- Denominazione di origine controllata, a similar certification regulated by Italian law
- French cuisine
- Geographical indications and traditional specialities in Switzerland
- Geographical indications and traditional specialities in the European Union
- List of Appellation d'Origine Contrôlée cheeses
- List of Appellation d'Origine Contrôlée liqueurs and spirits
- List of Appellation d'Origine Contrôlée wines
- Protected designation of origin, a classification defined in European Union Law
- Terroir
