= Institut national de l'origine et de la qualité =

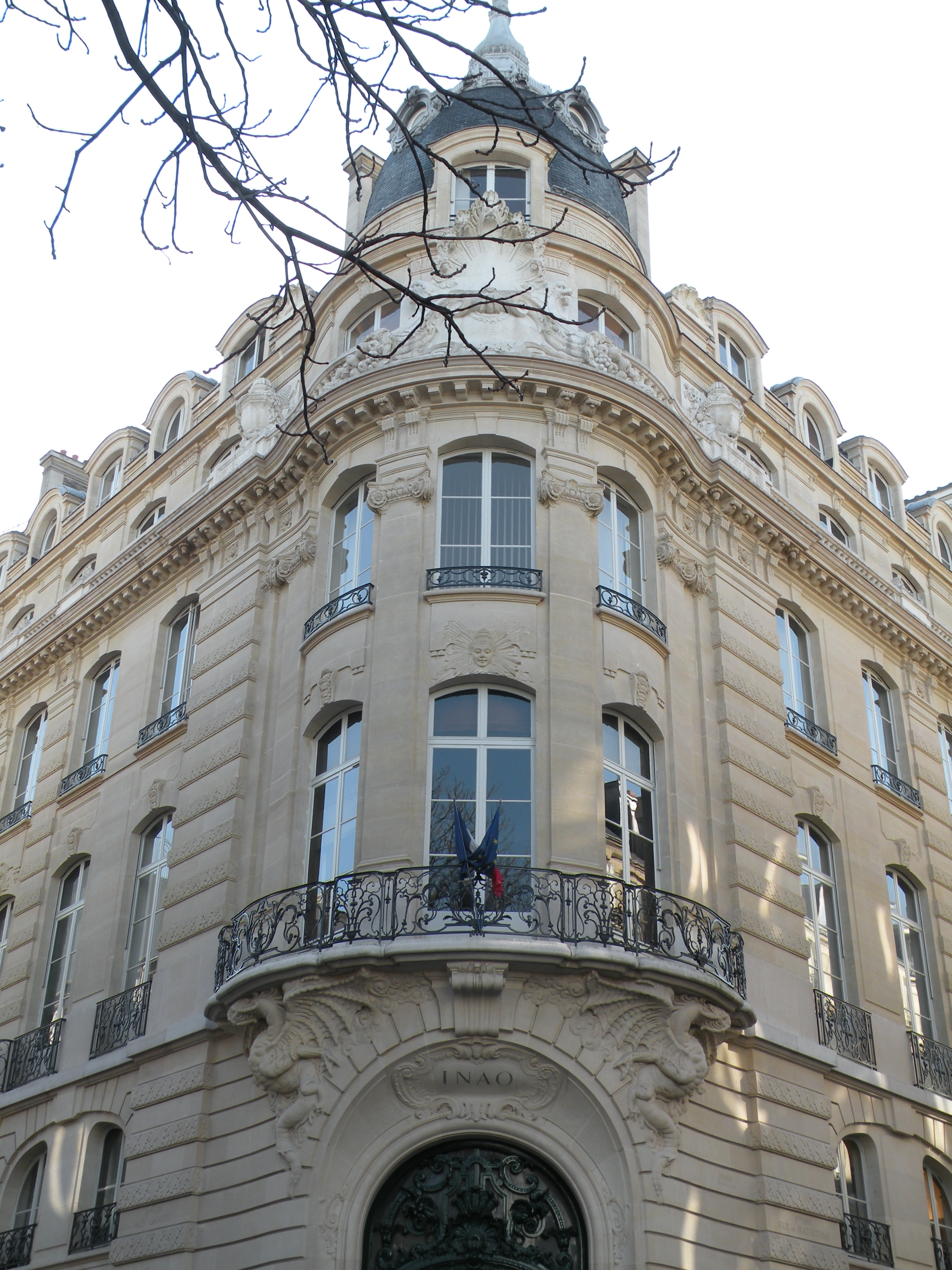
INAO's seat in Paris

The Institut national de l'origine et de la qualité (French: [ɛ̃stity nɑsjɔnal də lɔʁiʒin e d(ə) la kalite]; INAO; previously Institut National des Appellations d'Origine) is the French organization charged with regulating French agricultural products with protected designation of origin (PDOs). It is controlled by the Government of France, and it forms part of the Ministry of Agriculture. The organization was co-founded by Châteauneuf-du-Pape producer Baron Pierre Le Roy.

Every appellation d'origine contrôlée (AOC), the French term for PDOs, is produced according to rules codified by the INAO. Because its primary purpose is to regulate the use of noteworthy names, one of its primary tasks is to delimit the geographic area entitled to produce a product. For wine this means vineyards, but the INAO also regulates the places of processing and aging.

The INAO, like other organizations charged with regulating and helping producers, is often put in a contradictory position. An individual farmer may want his farm to be included in the limited area, but that might have the effect of diluting the average quality of the area. Rarely is this without controversy, and it is a delicate balancing act.

== History ==
Government control of agricultural products began with the law of August 1, 1905, granting the government authority to define the official boundaries for the production of certain agricultural products. At first, the appellations were not designed as measures of quality of the produce and failed to resolve the problem of over-production of wine, a problem that continues to this day. A second law, passed on May 6, 1919, gave the courts power to act in cases where the regulations were not being followed. This once again was an initial failure, as the resulting prosecutions proved to be long and fraught with difficulty.

In a further attempt to address problems in the wine industry, the INAO was created by a decree initiated by Joseph Capus and enacted on July 30, 1935. Under this law the Comité National des appellations d'origine (CNAO) was given the sole authority to rule on matters related to the quality of wine. The members of the committee included delegates of ministries of agriculture, finance and justice and presidents of viticulture syndicates. They consulted with the top wine producers in each region to define the boundaries of appellations and the rules for a wine to qualify. The CNAO was funded by a fee paid by the producers. A number of small wine producers were eager to escape the state regulations imposed on bulk winemakers, and sought to join. However the CNAO enforced high standards and the percentage of French wine designated as AOC actually declined in the first years after the CNAO was formed. The first AOC laws were passed in 1936, and most of the classical wines from Bordeaux, Burgundy, Champagne and Rhône had their initial set of AOC regulations before the end of 1937.

After World War II the committee became the public-private Institut National des Appellations d'Origine (INAO). In 1990, the economic success of the appellations led parliament in a law of July 2 to extend the powers of the INAO to cover all agricultural produce.

Since January 1, 2007, the Institute is renamed Institut national de l'origine et de la qualité and also guarantees organic and Label Rouge certifications. In spite of the name change it retains the abbreviation INAO.

== See also ==
- René Renou
- French wine
- Champagne Riots of 1911

== Sources ==
- Bouneau, Christine (1998). "CAPUS Joseph, Marie 1867-1947". Dictionnaire des parlementaires d'Aquitaine sous la Troisième République (in French). Presses Univ de Bordeaux. ISBN 978-2-86781-231-6.
- Colman, Tyler (2008-07-14). Wine Politics: How Governments, Environmentalists, Mobsters, and Critics Influence the Wines We Drink. University of California Press. ISBN 978-0-520-93473-3.
- Lukacs, Paul (2013-10-21). Inventing Wine: A New History of One of the World's Most Ancient Pleasures: A New History of One of the World's Most Ancient Pleasures. W. W. Norton. ISBN 978-0-393-23964-5.
