= 1924 in aviation =

This is a list of aviation-related events from 1924:

== Events ==
- Violating the Treaty of Versailles, Germany establishes a secret training base for German pilots at Lipetsk in the Soviet Union. More than 450 German personnel will train there over the next ten years.
- Following a military revolt, Brazil abolishes Brazilian Army and Brazilian Navy control of aviation and places all military aviation units under the direct control of the general staff.
- The Tachikawa Aircraft Company Ltd. is founded at Tachikawa, Japan.

=== January ===
- January 29 – Pateras Pesara flies an experimental helicopter in Paris. The machine flies 800 metres (2,640 ft) in just over 10 minutes.

=== February ===
- February 20 – Three French Army officers make the first two-way aerial crossing of the Sahara Desert in a Breguet 14.
- February 21 – Piloting a de Havilland DH-4, Farthest North Aviation Company pilot Carl Ben Eielson makes the first official air mail flight in the Territory of Alaska, a 280-mile (451 km) trip carrying 164 pounds (74.4 kg) of mail from Fairbanks to McGrath that takes him under three hours. Transportation of mail on the route by dog sled takes at least 18 — and as many as 30 — days.

=== March ===
- The admirals′ committee of the Regia Marina (Italian Royal Navy) considers an objection to the construction of aircraft carriers based on the observation that launching 40 planes from a carrier at present takes three hours, decides that the use of several carriers would solve the problem, and recommends that Italy construct at least two carriers.
- The Cierva C.6 makes a 10.5-kilometer (7-mile) flight in Spain from Cuatro Vientos airfield to Getafe airfield. The eight-minute flight is considered a major step forward in the development of autogiros and, by extension, of rotary-wing aircraft in general.
- March 1 – The Royal Air Force renames its Marine and Armament Experimental Establishment as the Marine Aircraft Experimental Establishment.
- March 25 – Squadron Leader Archibald Stuart Charles Stuart-MacLaren, Flying Officer William Noble Plenderleith, Sergeant W. H. Andrews of the Royal Air Force set off from Calshot in a Vickers Vulture II in an eastbound attempt to circumnavigate the world. Their attempt ultimately will fail on August 4 in the Commander Islands in the Bering Sea.
- March 27 – United States Army Air Service Second Lieutenant Oscar Monthan — a noted aeronautical engineer — dies along with four other men when their Martin NBS-1 bomber crashes after it fails to clear a baseball field backstop on take-off from Luke Field, Ford Island, Oahu, Territory of Hawaii.

=== April ===
- The International Commission for Aviation passes a resolution stating that "women shall be excluded from any employment in the operating crew of an aircraft engaged in public transport." A concern of the era is that women would have difficulty controlling an aircraft while menstruating.
- French Navy aviation pioneer Paul Teste flies from Paris to Saint-Raphaël in an FBA 17 amphibious aircraft to survey a potential route for large military seaplanes traveling from the Atlantic Ocean to the Mediterranean Sea and to assess the suitability of the Garonne and Aude river basins as landing and staging areas for seaplanes. In 20 hours of flight, he flies 2,000 kilometres (1,240 mi; 1,080 nmi) and performs 13 ground landings and 21 water landings — including stops at Bordeaux and Toulouse — without incident.
- April 1
  - Imperial Airways is formed, with the backing of the British government.
  - Flights of Royal Air Force aircraft operating from Royal Navy ships are given the collective title "Fleet Air Arm of the Royal Air Force." This will later be shortened to "Fleet Air Arm."
  - The Government of Canada approves the title "Royal" for the Canadian Air Force, establishing the new Royal Canadian Air Force (RCAF). In addition to its military duties, the RCAF takes over the responsibility for the control and regulation of all civil aviation in Canada.
- April 6 – Four United States Army Air Service Douglas World Cruisers depart Seattle, Washington, beginning a six-month westbound journey which will culminate in the first aerial circumnavigation of the world.
- April 7 – Portuguese Commander Brito Pais and Captain Sarmento de Beires depart Lisbon eastbound in the Breguet 16.Bn2 Patria, beginning an attempt to fly around the world. They will crash Patria in India, but will continue in the de Havilland DH.9A Patria II before being forced to end their attempt in June in China, a short walk from its border with Hong Kong.
- April 24 – French Captain Georges Pelletier d'Oisy and Adjutant Lucien Besin depart Paris eastbound in a Breguet 19.A.2, beginning an attempt to fly around the world. They will be forced to end their attempt in May in Shanghai.
- April 26 – Imperial Airways makes its first scheduled flight, from Croydon Aerodrome to Paris, using a de Havilland DH.34.
- Apr 30 – Regular Belfast–Liverpool airmail flights are inaugurated by Alan Cobham, using de Havilland DH.50 craft.

=== May ===
- Russian World War I flying ace Mikhail Safonov dies in a flying accident while testing a flying boat for the Republic of China Navy over the Ming River in China.
- May 2 – English first-class cricketer Eric Martin dies in an airplane collision at Duxford Aerodrome in Duxford, Cambridgeshire, England.
- May 17 – During its first aerial circumnavigation of the world, the westbound United States Army Air Service flight of Douglas World Cruisers arrive in northern Japan, completing the first crossing of the Pacific Ocean by airplane.
- May 19 – The first aerial circumnavigation of Australia is carried out, by a Royal Australian Air Force crew in a Fairey IIID.
- May 20 – French Captain Georges Pelletier d'Oisy and Adjutant Lucien Besin crash their Breguet 19.A.2 on a golf course in Shanghai, ending their attempt to fly around the world eastbound. They had covered 10,580 miles (17,037 km) in 26 days since leaving Paris.
- May 27 – French pilot Adrienne Bolland sets a world record for consecutive loop-the-loops by a woman, completing 212 loops in 73 minutes. She breaks her own record of 98, which she had set on 18 October 1923.

=== June ===
- Flying the Nieuport-Delage NiD 42S, the French pilot Joseph Sadi-Lecointe wins the Coupe Beaumont race as the only finisher, then continues flying to establish a new world speed-over-distance record over a distance of 500 km (310.69 miles), averaging 306.696 km/h (190.572 mph).
- Ludovic Arrachart wins the Michelin Cup long-distance flying competition.
- June 5 – Rowan Daly, a British flying ace credited with three aerial victories during World War I and four more during the Allied intervention in the Russian Civil War, dies in the mid-air collision of two Airco DH.9As over the airfield at Spittlegate, England. His observer and the two-man crew of the other plane also die.
- June 6 – Walter Kypke, a German flying ace credited with nine aerial victories during World War I, dies in an airplane crash at Magdeburg, Germany.
- June 16 – The Royal Air Force′s Marine Aircraft Experimental Establishment moves from Isle of Grain, Kent, to the former Seaplane Experimental Station at Felixstowe, Suffolk.
- June 23 – Lieutenant Russell Maughan makes the first one-day crossing of the United States, completing the flight from Long Island, New York, to San Francisco, California, in a Curtiss PW-8 in 21 hours 48 minutes.
- June 23–24 (overnight) – United States Navy Lieutenants Frank Wead and John D. Price make a flight in a Curtiss SC that sets five world records for seaplanes in its class. The flight sets a record for distance, covering 963.123 miles (1,549.996 km), and duration, remaining airborne for 13 hours, 23 minutes, 15 seconds. It also sets records for speed over a distance of 500 kilometres (311 mi), averaging 73.41 miles per hour (118.14 km/h); speed over a distance of 1,000 kilometres (621 mi), averaging 74.27 miles per hour (119.53 km/h) and speed over a distance of 1,500 kilometres (932 mi), averaging 74.17 miles per hour (119.37 km/h).
- June 24
  - In Shenzhen, close to the China-Hong Kong border, Portuguese Commander Brito Pais and Captain Sarmento de Beires give up on their eastbound attempt to circumnavigate the world in the de Havilland DH.9A Patria II after covering 11,000 miles (17,713 km) from Lisbon.
  - The Regia Aeronautica (Italian Royal Air Force) has 1,181 aircraft, of which 748 are combat-ready.
- June 25 – Westbound from Rangoon to Akyab, the United States Army Air Service flight of Douglas World Cruisers attempting the first aerial circumnavigation of the world unknowingly flies over the Vickers Vulture II amphibian of the Royal Air Force team of MacLaren, Plenderleith, and Andrews, which is sheltering in a coastal bay in Burma while eastbound from Akyab to Rangoon during its own attempt at a circumnavigation.

=== July ===
- July 1 – Regular night airmail services commence in the United States, linking Chicago, Illinois, with Cheyenne, Wyoming.
- July 10 – Japanese aircraft sink a ship for the first time, when Imperial Japanese Navy bombers use level bombing from an average height of 1,000 meters (3,281 feet) over the course of four hours to sink the retired coast defense battleship Iwami off Yokosuka.
- July 11–12 (overnight) – United States Navy Lieutenants Frank Wead and John D. Price make a flight in a Curtiss SC that sets two world records for seaplanes in its class. The flight sets a record for distance, covering 994.19 miles (1,599.99 km), and duration, remaining airborne for 14 hours, 53 minutes, 44 seconds.
- July 15 – French physician, parapsychology researcher, and director of the Institute Metapsychique International Gustav Geley dies in an airplane accident.
- July 17 – French Captain Georges Pelletier d'Oisy completes a flight from Paris to Tokyo, using a Breguet 14 borrowed from the Republic of China government after the May crash of his Breguet 19.A.2 at Shanghai. The journey from Paris takes 120 hours in the air over 84 days.

=== August ===
- The Bolivian Air Force is formed, as the Cuerpo de Aviación ("Aviation Corps").
- The Regia Aeronautica (Italian Royal Air Force) participates in the first large-scale Regia Marina (Italian Royal Navy) maneuvers since 1910. The air force aircraft are tasked to conduct surveillance in coastal waters, reconnoiter enemy bases, and strike enemy ships that come within range. The air force is hampered by poor communications with the navy, the grounding of its airships – necessary for reconnaissance at ranges of more than 100 miles (161 km) – due to weather, and difficulty in distinguishing between ship types and between friendly and enemy ships. In a final fiasco, the "Red" fleet "torpedoes" the "Blue" fleet's flagship, the battleship Andrea Doria, as the "Blue" fleet enters port at Augusta, Sicily, at the end of the maneuvers after the "Blue" fleet's air escort breaks formation to overfly the fleet in a celebratory pass.
- August 4 – The attempt of the Royal Air Force team of MacLaren, Plenderleith, and Andrews to circumnavigate the world eastbound ends when they are forced down in the Bering Sea by fog and their Vickers Vulture amphibian is irreparably damaged. They taxi to safety at Bering Island in the Commander Islands. They had covered 13,100 miles (21,095 km) in 130 days.
- August 5 – Harold Albert Kullberg, an American World War I flying ace who flew with the British Royal Air Force and was credited with 19 aerial victories, dies in an airplane crash while instructing a student pilot near Hudson, Ohio.
- August 8 – The U.S. Navy dirigible USS Shenandoah (ZR-1) docks with the airship tender USS Patoka (AO-9) while the Patoka is underway off Newport, Rhode Island, showing that airships could operate from support ships far out to sea.
- August 9 – Polish aviation pioneer Władysław Toruń, one of the Polish Air Force's first pilots, dies in an airplane crash.
- August 16 – George S. L. Hayward, a British air observer in Bristol F.2B Fighters credited with 24 victories during World War I, and a pilot he is instructing suffer fatal injuries when their Avro 504K suffers an engine failure and crashes at RAF Digby in Lincolnshire, England. Both men die later that day.
- August 24 – The U.S. Navy light cruiser USS Richmond (CL-9) rescues the crew of an Italian flying boat that is forced down in the Arctic Ocean by bad weather.
- August 31 – Six United States Army Air Service aviators flying Douglas World Cruisers arrive in Labrador, completing the transatlantic leg of their first aerial circumnavigation of the world.

=== September ===
- September 2 – While preparing for the National Air Races, United States Army Air Service test pilot Lieutenant Alexander Pearson Jr., the holder of numerous flight records, dies instantly when a wing strut of the Curtiss R-8 he is flying fails as he attempts to recover from a dive and the plane crashes into the ground at 260 miles per hour (418 km/h) near Fairfield, Ohio.
- September 3 – A U.S. Army Air Service pilot sets a speed record for a flight from Boston, Massachusetts, to New York City, completing the trip in 58 minutes.
- September 11 – Canada's first regular airmail service begins, with Laurentide Air Services linking Haileybury, Ontario, with Rouyn, Quebec.
- September 27-October 4 – The Daily Mail sponsors the Two-Seater Dual-Control Light Aeroplane Competition at Lympne Aerodrome in Lympne, England, the second of the three light airplane trials held there. Maurice Piercey wins in the Beardmore Wee Bee.
- September 28 – Greeted by 50,000 people and a congratulatory telegram from President Calvin Coolidge, two of the original four United States Army Air Service Douglas World Cruisers that had set out from Seattle, Washington, on April 6 arrive in Seattle, completing the first aerial circumnavigation of the world. Their westbound journey had covered 27,534 miles (44,338 km) in 371 hours in the air, taking 175 days. They have made 57 hops during the trip, averaging 483 miles (778 km) per hop, and visited 25 U.S. states and 21 foreign countries.

=== October ===
- October 1 – The fourth annual Air League Challenge Cup race takes place over a 100-mile (161-kilometer) triangular course beginning and ending at Lympne Airport in Lympne, Kent, England. Three flights, each consisting of three Sopwith Snipes flown by Royal Air Force pilots, participate; one flight represents No. 25 Squadron at RAF Hawkinge, another No. 32 Squadron at RAF Kenley, and the third No. 56 Squadron at RAF Biggin Hill. Each flight flies the race in formation. No. 25 Squadron's flight finishes third with a time of 59 minutes 7.4 seconds, but is declared the winner when the other two flights are disqualified for cutting the western turning point and therefore failing to fly the entire course. The race is not held again until 1927.
- October 4 – Burt E. Skeel dies during the National Air Races when the wings of his Curtiss airplane break away from its fuselage at an altitude of 2,000 feet (610 metres) and the plane dives into the ground at about 275 mph (443 km/h) as 50,000 spectators look on at Dayton, Ohio.
- October 9 – In the United Kingdom, the Royal Auxiliary Air Force is established.
- October 10 – United States Navy Lieutenants Andrew Crinkley and Rossmore Lyon make a flight in a Curtiss SC covering 1,460 miles (2,350 km) in 20 hours minutes, 28 minutes. Although the flight would have set new world records for distance and duration for a seaplane in the Curtiss SC's class, the flight was not officially timed and was therefore not recognized as setting any world records.
- October 12–15 – The Luftschiffbau Zeppelin-built dirigible LZ 126 is flown from Friederichshafen, Germany, nonstop to the Lakehurst, New Jersey, in the United States under guidance of Hugo Eckener for delivery to the U.S. Navy as a World War I war reparation. It is the longest nonstop airship flight in history at the time, covering 5,060 miles (8,148 km) in 81 hours and passing over the Azores, the Dominion of Newfoundland, and New York City along the way.
- October 18 – Italian World War I ace and aviation pioneer Giovanni Ancillotto dies in an automobile accident in Caravaggio, Lombardy, Italy.

=== November ===
- Twenty-two of Brazil's 39 naval pilots are arrested for antigovernment activity.
- November 2 – The Pitcairn Flying School and Passenger Service is formed. It later will become Eastern Airlines.
- November 8 – Warrant Officer Florentin Bonnet sets the French speed record, reaching 393.340 km (244.410 mi) in the Bernard SIMB V.2 at Istres, France.
- November 11
  - While Georges Madon — the fourth-ranked French flying ace of World War I, credited with 41 confirmed aerial victories and 64 probables — is preparing for a tribute to the French aviation pioneer and flying ace Roland Garros at Bizerte, Tunisia, his plane suffers an engine failure. He crashes it into the roof of a villa to avoid hitting spectators and dies at Tunis later in the day of injuries he sustained in the crash.
  - Lieutenant Dixie Kiefer makes the first night catapult launch from a ship, the U.S. Navy battleship USS California (BB-44).
- November 15 – Portuguese aviation pioneer Sacadura Cabral and his copilot disappear during a flight over the English Channel. Wreckage of their seaplane is discovered on November 19, but their bodies are never found.
- November 24 – A KLM Fokker F.VII makes the first flight from the Netherlands to the Dutch East Indies, taking 127 hours 16 minutes.
- November 25 – The German-built dirigible LZ 126 is commissioned into United States Navy service as USS Los Angeles (ZR-3) at Naval Air Station Anacostia in Washington, D.C.

=== December ===
- December 11 – Flying the Bernard SIMB V.2, Warrant Officer Florentin Bonnet sets an absolute world speed record at Istres, France, averaging 448.171 km/h (278.481 mph) during four runs over a 3-kilometre (1.86-mile) course. His speeds for each run are 442.623 km/h (275.033 mph), 450.000 km/h (279.617 mph), 446.280 km/h (277.306 mph), and 453.781 km/h (281.966 mph). To increase his speed, he exploits a loophole in Fédération Aéronautique Internationale (FAI) regulations — which stipulate a maximum altitude of only 50 metres (164 feet) at 500 metres (1,640 feet) before each base crossing, where officials calculate the speed of each run — by climbing to an altitude of 40 metres (131 feet) at each turn and diving 30 metres (98 feet) to gain speed before crossing the 500-metre (1,640-foot) marker.
- December 12
  - Flying the Dewoitine D.8, French pilot Marcel Doret sets a new world speed record for an aircraft with a load of 250 kilograms (551 pounds) over a closed-circuit 1,000-kilometre (621-mile) course, averaging 221.775 kilometres per hour (137.805 mph).
  - The Cierva C.6 autogyro makes the first cross-country flight by a rotary-wing aircraft, piloted by Captain Joaquín Loriga the 10.5 km (7 statute miles) from Cuatro Vientos airfield to Getafe, Spain, in eight minutes.
- December 13 – In an early parasite fighter experiment, Lieutenant Clyde Flinter unsuccessfully attempts to dock his Sperry Messenger with the United States Army airship TC-3.
- December 14 – A Martin MO-1 is launched using an explosive-driven catapult fitted to a gun turret on the United States Navy battleship USS Mississippi (BB-41), requiring less distance than ever for the take-off.
- December 23 –Flying the Dewoitine D.8, Marcel Doret sets three new world speed records for an aircraft with a load of 250 kilograms (551 pounds) over a closed-circuit course, averaging 231.292 kilometres per hour (143.718 mph) over 100 kilometres (62.1 miles), 225.705 kilometres per hour (140.247 mph) over 200 kilometres (124.3 miles), and 223.098 kilometres per hour (138.627 mph) over 500 kilometres (310.7 miles).
- December 24 – Imperial Airways de Havilland DH.34 G-EBBX crashes at Purley, Surrey, in the United Kingdom, shortly after takeoff from Croydon Airport, killing all eight people on board. It is Imperial Airways' first fatal accident, and as a result of a public inquiry into the disaster Croydon Airport is expanded to absorb almost all of Beddington Aerodrome. The airliner's pilot, David Stewart, had been a World War I flying ace credited with 16 aerial victories.

== First flights ==
- Avia BH-10 (Czech air arm designation Avia B.10)
- Avia BH-12
- Avia BH-17
- Avro 562 Avis
- Dewoitine D.9
- Latécoère 14
- Levasseur PL.5
- Levasseur PL.6
- Martin N2M
- Potez 25
- Potez 27
- Thomas-Morse TM-23
- Summer 1924 – Latécoère 6
- Mid-1924 – Avro 557 Ava
- ca. 1924 – Dewoitine D.7

=== January ===
- Grigorovich I-1

=== February ===
- February 18 – Latécoère 5

=== March ===
- Cierva C.6

=== April ===
- Farman F.140 Super Goliath
- April 23 – Stout 2-AT Pullman

=== May ===
- Bernard SIMB V.1
- May 4 – Sikorsky S-29-A
- May 9 – Westland Dreadnought
- May 26 – Tupolev ANT-2
- May 30 – Marinens Flyvebaatfabrikk M.F.8

=== June ===
- June 16 – Blériot-SPAD S.51
- June 23 – Focke-Wulf A 16
- June 28 – Avro 561 Andover

=== July ===
- July 19 – Blériot 135

=== August ===
- Bernard SIMB AB 10
- Hawker Cygnet
- Potez 26
- Savoia-Marchetti S.55
- August 13 – Dewoitine D.15
- August 20 – Fairey Pintail IV
- August 21 – Fokker F.VII
- August 24 – FBA 19

=== September ===
- Aero A.24
- September 4 – Curtiss F4C-1
- September 14 – Westland Woodpigeon
- September 19 – Junkers G.24, also known as Junkers G.23
- September 22 – Westland Widgeon

=== October ===
- October 2 – Bernard SIMB V.2
- October 4 – Curtiss XPW-8A, predecessor of the XPW-8B, prototype in turn of the Curtiss P-1 Hawk

=== November ===
- Kawanishi K-7 Transport Seaplane
- November 4 – Grigorovich I-2
- November 6 – Dornier Do J
- November 24 – Fokker F.VII

== Entered service ==
- Grigorovich M-24 with Soviet Naval Aviation
- Mitsubishi B1M with Imperial Japanese Navy
- Autumn 1924 – Breguet 19 (A.2 reconnaissance variant; first operational variant) with the 32e, 33e, 34e, and 35e Régiments d'Aviation of the French Army's Aéronautique Militaire

=== March ===
- Fairey Fawn with No. 12 Squadron RAF

=== May ===
- Armstrong Whitworth Siskin III with No. 41 Squadron, Royal Air Force

=== July ===
- Avro 549 Aldershot with No. 99 Squadron, Royal Air Force
