= Caspar CS 14 =

CS 14
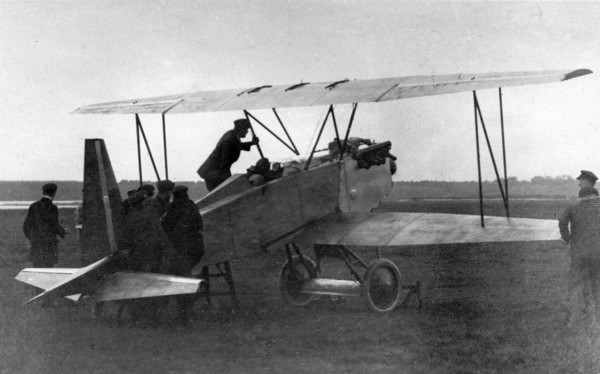

General information
- Type: Fighter aircraft
- Manufacturer: Dansk Aero
- Designer: E. von Lössl
- Number built: 1

History
- First flight: 1924

The Caspar CS 14 was a German military aircraft built in the 1920s. At first it was seen as a single seat fighter but was later modified to the reconnaissance role with a second seat.

== Design and development ==
The Caspar CS 14 was designed by Caspar's engineer E. von Lössl but built in Copenhagen by Dansk Aero in order to avoid the restrictions on military aircraft construction imposed on Germany by the Allies after World War I. It was an equal span, two bay biplane powered by a 450 hp (340 kW) Napier Lion W-12.

Apart from the more powerful engine and a 1.0 m (3 ft 3 in) increase in the span of the rectangular inner panels and a consequent increase in wing area, the CS 14 was unchanged from the earlier Caspar CJ 14.

== Operational history ==
Like its predecessor the CJ 14, the CS 14 failed to sell. Despite the proposed change in role enabled by the second seat only one was built and development was ended in 1926.

== Specifications (two seat variant) ==
Data from

General characteristics

- Crew: Two
- Length: 6.58 m (21 ft 7 in)
- Wingspan: 10.00 m (32 ft 10 in)
- Height: 2.97 m (9 ft 9 in)
- Wing area: 30.70 m^{2} (330.5 sq ft)
- Empty weight: 1,130 kg (2,491 lb)
- Gross weight: 1,780 kg (3,924 lb)
- Powerplant: 1 × Napier Lion IV W-12 water-cooled piston engine, 340 kW (450 hp)
- Propellers: 2-bladed fixed pitch propeller

Performance

- Maximum speed: 250 km/h (160 mph, 130 kn)
- Cruise speed: 210 km/h (130 mph, 110 kn)
- Range: 800 km (500 mi, 430 nmi)
- Service ceiling: 4,200 m (13,800 ft)
