= Caspar CJ 14 =

Prototype aircraft

CJ 14

General information
- Type: Fighter aircraft
- Manufacturer: Dansk Aero
- Designer: E. von Lössl
- Number built: 1

History
- First flight: 1924

The Caspar CJ 14 was a German fighter aircraft prototype built in the 1920s.

== Design and development ==
The Caspar CJ 15 was designed by Caspar's engineer E. von Lössl but built in Copenhagen by Dansk Aero in order to avoid the restrictions on military aircraft construction imposed on Germany by the Allies after World War I. It was an equal span, two bay, single seat biplane intended to be powered by a 380 hp (280 kW) Armstrong-Siddeley Jaguar radial engine, though the prototype was at first fitted with a water-cooled, 300 hp (220 kW) Hispano-Suiza engine. The broadly similar though longer span (and later two seat) Caspar CS 14 was powered by a Napier Lion W-12.

The wings had wooden structures and plywood covering and, for a biplane of the period, quite thick-sections informed by the early post-war German concentration on gliders. In plan they had rectangular centre-sections and trapezoidal outer panels. The upper wing was a one piece structure, held high over the fuselage by a cabane of outward-leaning, N-form steel tube cabane struts, and the lower was in two parts, mounted on steel tube false spars under the fuselage. Upper and lower wings were braced together with light stagger by N-form struts. Ailerons were fitted only to the upper wing.

The CJ 14's fuselage was in three parts, with a steel tube forward section mounting the engine, a central wooden, ply-covered section containing the cockpit and a metal, pointed tail section carrying the empennage. The pilot was positioned just behind the upper trailing edge and there were transparent apertures in the upper wing to increase the field of view. Proposed armament was a pair of Vickers guns mounted in the nose. The tail was conventional, though the near triangular fin and rudder were both unusually tall and narrow as well as being well ahead of the rear of the fuselage.

The CJ 14's powerful engine required a large diameter propeller and hence long landing legs to provide ground clearance. The axle was streamlined and hinged on pairs of narrow-V form drag struts.

== Operational history ==
The CJ 14 was first flown in 1924 but only one was built. Development of its successor, the CS 14, was abandoned in 1926.

== Specifications ==
Data from Les Ailes April 1925

General characteristics

- Crew: One
- Length: 5.4 m (17 ft 9 in)
- Wingspan: 8.6 m (28 ft 3 in)
- Height: 2.78 m (9 ft 1 in)
- Wing area: 15.3 m^{2} (165 sq ft)
- Empty weight: 800 kg (1,764 lb)
- Gross weight: 1,200 kg (2,646 lb)
- Powerplant: 1 × Armstrong Siddeley Jaguar III 14-cylinder air-cooled radial piston engine, 280 kW (380 hp)
- Propellers: 2-bladed fixed pitch propeller

Performance

- Maximum speed: 270 km/h (170 mph, 150 kn)
- Cruise speed: 225 km/h (140 mph, 121 kn)
- Range: 600 km (370 mi, 320 nmi)
