= Blériot-SPAD S.61 =

S.61
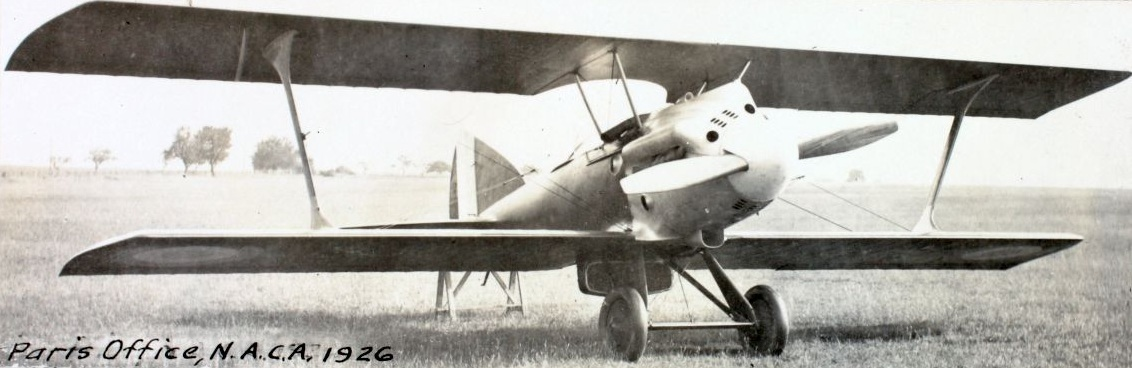

General information
- Type: Fighter
- Manufacturer: Blériot, and CWL/PZL under licence
- Designer: André Herbemont
- Primary users: Polish Air Force Romanian Air Force
- Number built: ca. 350, plus 30 built under licence in Poland

History
- First flight: 6 November 1923

The Blériot-SPAD S.61 was a French fighter aircraft developed in 1923. Designed by André Herbemont, the S.61 was a conventional biplane, abandoning the swept upper wing used by Herbemont in several previous designs. The prototype S.61 was evaluated by the French Air Force alongside the S.51 as a potential new fighter, but like its stablemate, was rejected. The Polish Air Force (which had also purchased the S.51) was impressed enough to order 250, as well as purchase licences for local production. The Romanian Air Force also ordered 100 aircraft. About 30 were built in Poland, by the CWL (Centralne Warszaty Lotnicze - Central Aviation Workshops, a predecessor of PZL).

== Operational history ==
Apart from their military service, S.61s were used in France for racing and record-setting attempts. On 25 June 1925, Pelletier d'Oisy won the cross-country Coupe Michelin in an S.61, and another of the type won the 1927 competition and was placed second in 1929. An S.61 was also used by Jean Callizo in his fraudulent attempt on the world altitude record that saw him stripped of his Légion d'Honneur. A Polish S.61 placed second in the Capitaine Echard race at the Zürich aerial meeting in 1927.

The S.61 (known in Poland simply as Spad S.61) had a poor reputation in Poland due to numerous crashes, many attributed to a weak wing mounting. During the period from 1926 to 1931, 26 pilots were killed while flying the S.61.

== Variants ==
S.61/1
prototype for French evaluation, powered by a 320 kW (430 hp) Lorraine-Dietrich 12E W-12 engine with supplementary supercharger.

S.61/2
production version for Poland and Romania, powered by a 340 kW (450 hp) Lorraine-Dietrich 12E W-12 engine with supplementary supercharger.

S.61bis
converted S.61/2, powered by a 320 kW (430 hp) Lorraine-Dietrich 12E W-12 engine with supplementary supercharger.

S.61/3
single machine with reduced wingspan, powered by a 320 kW (430 hp) Lorraine-Dietrich 12E W-12 engine with supplementary supercharger.

S.61/4
single machine with a 360 kW (480 hp) Lorraine-Dietrich 12Ee W-12 engine.

S.61/5
three machines with a 340 kW (450 hp) Hispano-Suiza 12Gb W-12 engine.

S.61/6
racer prototype converted from the S.61bis, powered by a 320 kW (430 hp) Lorraine-Dietrich 12E W-12 engine with supplementary supercharger.

S.61/6a:single racer

S.61/6b:The S.61/6a converted with extra fuel tankage for the 1924 Coupe Michelin race

S.61/6c:single aircraft built to contest world airspeed record; destroyed in the attempt

S.61/6d:single aircraft built for unsuccessful attempt on world airspeed record.

S.61/7
Powered by a 340 kW (450 hp) Lorraine-Dietrich 12Eb W-12 engine, with Rateau supercharger for world altitude record attempt.

S.61/8
A single S.61/5 refitted with a 370 kW (500 hp) Hispano-Suiza 12Hb V-12 engine.

S.61/9

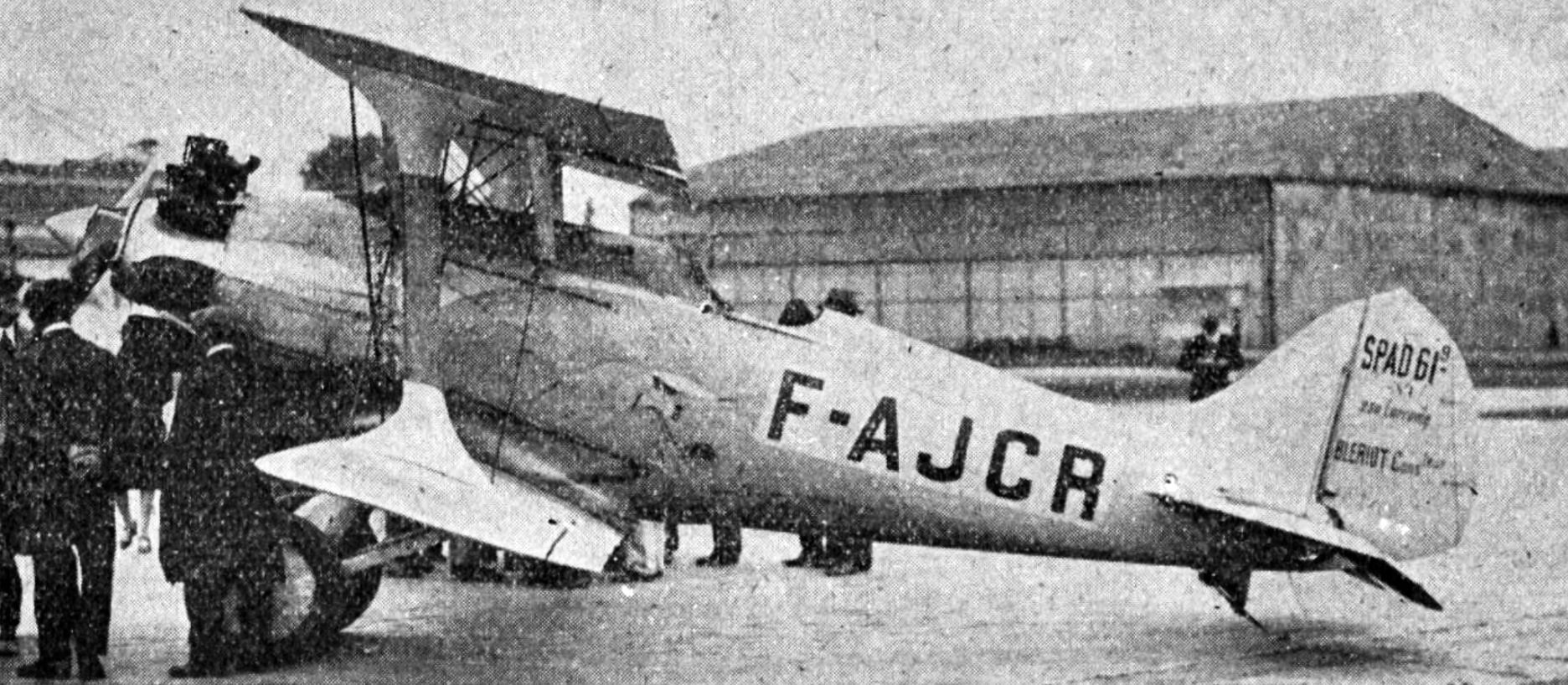
Blériot-SPAD S.61/9 photo from L'Aérophile July,1929

single S.61/6d modified for 1929 Coupe Michelin race, powered by a 170 kW (230 hp) Lorraine 7Ma Mizar radial engine.

S.61Ses
(Ses for Sesquiplane) This was the final version of the Bleriot S.61, fitted with sesquiplane wings, powered by a 340 kW (450 hp) Lorraine-Dietrich 12Eb W-12 engine. (1 built).

== Operators ==
Poland

- Polish Air Force
  - 2nd Fighter Regiment
  - 3rd Fighter Regiment
  - 4th Fighter Regiment
  - 11th Fighter Regiment

Romania

- Royal Romanian Air Force - 100 purchased

Soviet Union

- Soviet Air Force - One aircraft, used for tests and trials.

== Specifications (S.61/2) ==
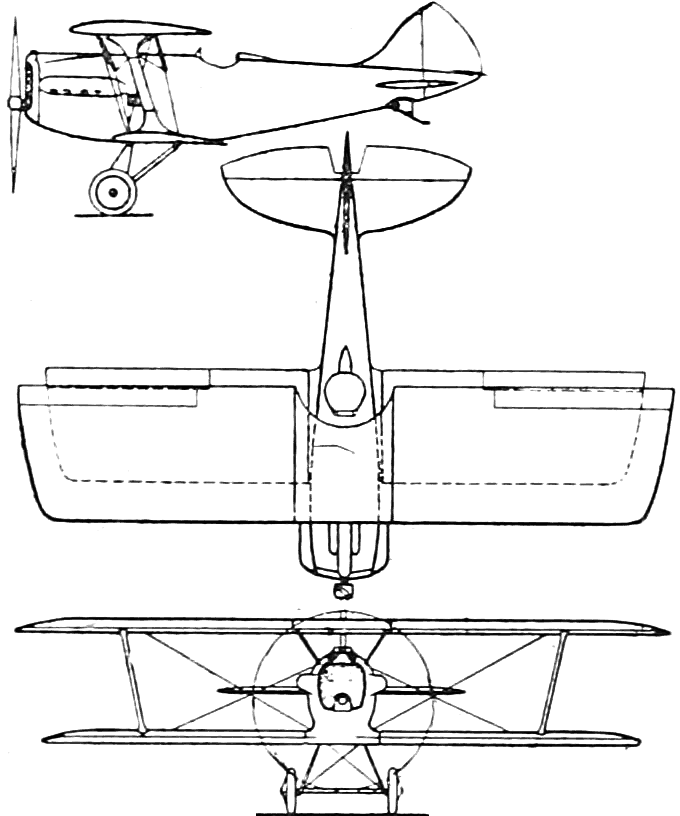
Bleriot-SPAD S.61 3-view Aero Digest August,1930

Data from Jane's all the World's Aircraft 1928, Aviafrance:S.61/2

General characteristics

- Crew: 1
- Length: 6.6 m (21 ft 8 in)
- Upper wingspan: 9.62 m (31 ft 7 in)
- Lower wingspan: 8.96 m (29 ft 5 in)
- Height: 3.1 m (10 ft 2 in)
- Wing area: 30 m^{2} (320 sq ft)
- Empty weight: 1,012 kg (2,231 lb)
- Gross weight: 1,522 kg (3,355 lb)
- Powerplant: 1 × Lorraine-Dietrich 12E W-12 water-cooled piston engine, 340 kW (450 hp)
- Propellers: 2-bladed fixed pitch propeller

Performance

- Maximum speed: 260 km/h (160 mph, 140 kn)
- Range: 400 km (250 mi, 220 nmi)
- Service ceiling: 8,500 m (27,900 ft)
- Time to altitude: 4,000 m (13,000 ft) in 9 minutes 29 seconds
- Wing loading: 50.7 kg/m^{2} (10.4 lb/sq ft)
- Power/mass: 0.2108 kW/kg (0.1282 hp/lb)

Armament
2 × fixed, forward-firing 7.7 mm (0.303 in) Vickers machine-guns

== See also ==
Related lists

- List of Interwar military aircraft

== Bibliography ==
- Kotelnikov, V.; Kulikov, V. & Cony, C. (November 2001). "Les avions français en URSS, 1921–1941" [French Aircraft in the USSR, 1921–1941]. Avions: Toute l'Aéronautique et son histoire (in French) (104): 37–43. ISSN 1243-8650.
- Passingham, Malcolm; Noël (October 1989). "Les avions militaires roumains de 1910 à 1945". Le Fana de l'Aviation (in French). No. 239. pp. 14–15, 17–21.
