= Marcel Pierre Vialet =

French World War I flying ace

- Born: August 21, 1887; Lyon, France
- Died: September 21, 1925 (aged 38)
- Military career
- Allegiance: France
- Branch: Cavalry; aviation
- Rank: Sous lieutenant
- Units: 7e Regiment de Cuirassiers; Escadrille 53; Escadrille 67
- Awards: Légion d'honneur Médaille militaire Croix de Guerre
- Other work: Served in Rif War in Morocco

Sous lieutenant Marcel Pierre Vialet (21 August 1887–21 September 1925) was a French World War I flying ace credited with nine aerial victories. Postwar, he would serve in the Rif War in Morocco, dying there from an illness.

== Early life ==
Marcel Pierre Vialet was born in Lyon, France, on 21 August 1887. Vialet traveled in his youth, but returned home to France as World War I began.

== World War I service ==
Vialet immediately joined the cavalry, but was seriously wounded in late 1914. While in hospital, he applied for a transfer to aviation. On 23 February 1915, he started training; on 12 November, he received Military Pilot's Brevet No. 2533. He then served as a test pilot on Caudrons. From there, he was assigned to Escadrille 53, having already logged 376 flight hours. On 28 April 1916, he was credited with his first aerial victory, over a German Fokker Eindekker. Two days later, he flew a successful escort mission despite having his controls cut. A Médaille militaire followed, on 22 May 1916.

In June 1916, he was reassigned to a Nieuport unit, Escadrille N.67. He would run up eight more victories there, including one shared with Georges Flachaire.

Postwar, he remained in the military. He later died on 21 September 1925 in Briançon, France from an illness contracted during the Rif War in Morocco.

== Honors and awards ==
=== Médaille militaire ===
"Marechal-des-Logis of the Escadrille C53. A pilot of great value who always shows his courage, audacity and sang-froid. On 28 April 1916, returning from a reconnaissance over German lines, from close in he attacked a German plane which was seen to fall disabled. On 30 April [1916] he resolutely attacked an enemy scout in order to ward it away from an airplane he was protecting. Having had his controls cut, he succeeded after a fall of 2,000 meters to stabilize his plane and save his observer."

=== Légion d'honneur ===
"Marechal-des-Logis pilot of Escadrille N67, wounded twice in the cavalry, requested a transfer to aviation where he has become a pilot of the highest order, of remarkable strength and exceptional audacity. Already has the Médaille Militaire for downing two enemy planes, under particularly difficult circumstances, in March and April 1916; on 6 August [1916] he succeeded during the course of the same flight to down two other German planes sequentially one behind our lines the other near the trenches."

He also won the Croix de guerre.
