= Jean Navarre =

French aviator

Jean Marie Dominique Navarre
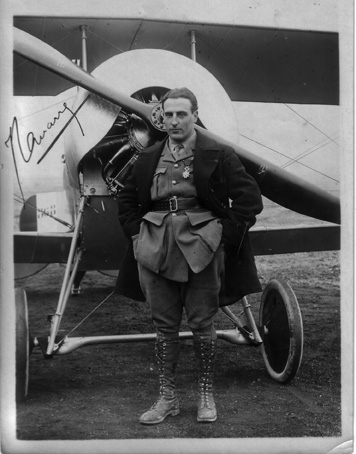
- Born: 8 August 1895; Jouy-sur-Morin, France
- Died: 10 July 1919 (aged 23); Villacoublay, France
- Military career
- Allegiance: France
- Branch: French Army
- Service years: 1914–1919
- Rank: Sous lieutenant
- Nickname: "The Sentinel of Verdun"
- Units: Escadrille 8; Escadrille 12; Escadrille 67
- Awards: Légion d'honneur; Médaille militaire; Croix de guerre

Jean Marie Dominique Navarre (8 August 1895 – 10 July 1919) was a French aviator during World War I. As one of the pioneer flying aces, he was credited with twelve confirmed aerial victories and fifteen unconfirmed ones.

== Early life ==
Jean Marie Dominique Navarre.

Born on 8 August 1895 in Jouy-sur-Morin, Navarre turned out to be a difficult child who challenged his teachers and frequently played truant with his twin brother, Pierre.

Navarre earned Civil Pilot's Brevet No. 581 on 22 August 1911. This earned him immediate entry into French military aviation in August 1914, when the World War began.

== World War I service ==
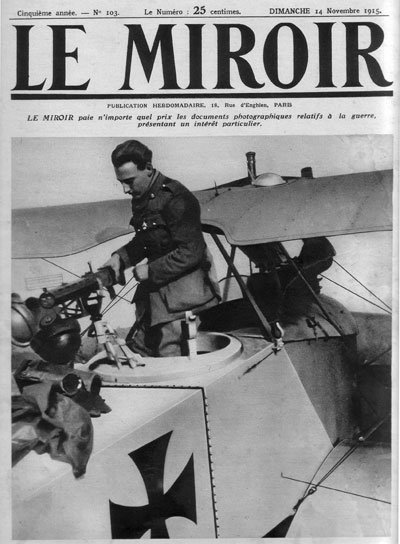
Jean Navarre inspecting a captured German aircraft (Le Miroir, 14 November 1915). (Possibly his 3rd official credit: FA 33 - LVG C II n°523/15 captured 26 October 1915

In September 1914, Navarre earned Military Pilot's Brevet No. 601. He was originally assigned to Escadrille MF8. (Note: The "MF" designating the unit's use of Maurice Farman aircraft.) He then joined the MS12 reconnaissance squadron, flying Morane-Saulnier L aircraft, nicknamed 'parasol' due to the large upper wing covering most of its narrow fuselage. Shortly thereafter, on 1 April 1915, Navarre was the pilot when his observer shot down a German Aviatik north of Fismes. Navarre's first victory earned him a Médaille militaire, awarded just five days later, to join his Croix de Guerre. On 13 April 1915, Navarre again scored while flying, this time with a different gunner. On 2 August 1915, he was made a Chevalier de la Légion d'honneur, with the citation based as much on secretive special missions as on aerial victory. He would score once more, on 26 October 1915, before reassignment to Escadrille 67 to fly a Nieuport.

Navarre was flying an aircraft that he had painted a patriotic and striking red, white, and blue. When he received new Nieuport 11 and Nieuport 16 fighters in May 1916, he deliberately painted both red to challenge and intimidate the enemy in the skies over Verdun, well before his German counterpart would gain notoriety as the Red Baron. (Note: Sources report Navarre as having an all-red Nieuport as early as February 1916. Richthofen was first known to have a red Albatros in January 1917.) Navarre began his victory string with his new unit by scoring one of the first "doubles" of the war, downing a Fokker E.III and a German two-seater on 26 February 1916, and becoming one of the first flying aces in history. He was dubbed the first official French flying ace, though Adolphe Pégoud preceded him. Navarre tallied half a dozen more wins during the next three months and on May 19, 1916, he shot down a German Aviatik C over Chattancourt, France, becoming the first Allied ace credited with 10 victories.

On 17 June 1916, Navarre teamed with Georges Pelletier d'Oisy, and they achieved Navarre's twelfth win. In the process, Jean Navarre was shot down and sustained severe head injuries from which he never fully recovered. Navarre's twin brother was killed in a flying accident at about the same time. Jean Navarre was removed from active duty and sent to a sanatorium to convalesce. He would return to duty in 1918, though he would not again fly in combat.

== Personal life during World War I ==
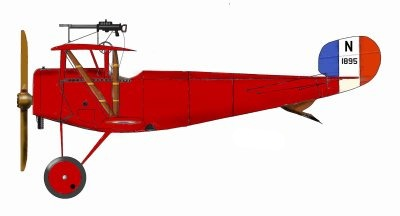
Navarre's red Nieuport 11. The "Guardian of Verdun".

In the early days of the war, flyers mainly flew reconnaissance missions, and their aircraft were not armed.

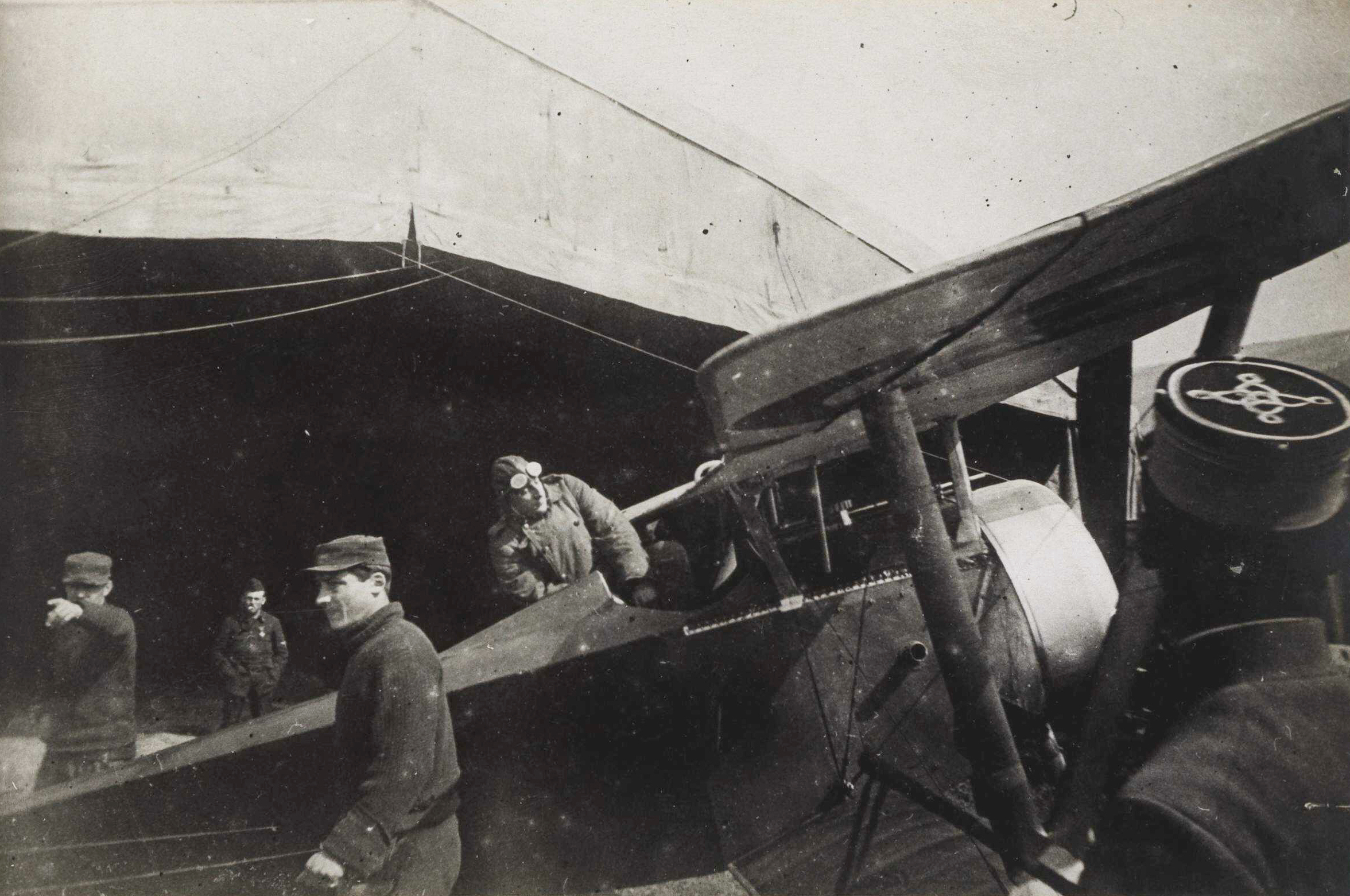
Jean Navarre, the Sentinel of Verdun boards his red Nieuport 16 fighter N1130 at Lemmes airfield 16 May 1916 (cropped)

Flyers would sometimes wave at their opponents when meeting in the air. Navarre felt strongly that combatants should kill their enemies; there was no room for fraternizing gestures. He later became one of the first flying aces.

Navarre continuously experimented with ways to improve his aircraft's armament, at one point installing rockets. By this time, Navarre had achieved 12 victories despite his technical handicap.

Navarre became close friends with fellow ace Charles Nungesser, who was as reckless and insubordinate as himself. In addition to their growing reputation as flying aces, Navarre and Nungesser also became extremely popular in Parisian nightlife for a number of colorful and unorthodox stunts.

== Post-World War I ==
After the end of hostilities, a victory parade was planned on the Champs Élysées on 14 July 1919. However, the high command ordered airmen to participate on foot rather than flying their aircraft. The headstrong 'heroes of the air' took this as an insult. At a meeting in the 'Fouquet' bar on the Champs Élysées, they decided to respond to this by selecting one of their number to fly through the Arc de Triomphe. Navarre, as the first among the aces, was considered the ideal choice despite his injuries. Navarre crashed his aircraft while practicing for this stunt and died at Villacoublay aerodrome on 10 July. He was 23 years old. Fellow pilot Charles Godefroy would eventually perform the historic flight through the Arc de Triomphe a few weeks later on 7 August 1919.

== Honors and awards ==
Médaille militaire

"Sergent pilot of Escadrille MS12 of remarkable skill and audacity. He has battled two enemy aircraft in one week, meeting them and attacking from a few meters in spite of the enemy observer's fire. He forced one of them to land behind our lines, allowing the pilot and observer, both of whom had been wounded by his observer's fire, to be taken prisoner."

Légion d'honneur

"Adjudant pilot of Escadrille MS12, remarkably adroit and devoted, he has had several aerial combats, one of which permitted the capture of two enemy officers and an enemy aircraft. He volunteers for all the delicate missions, and has executed special and particularly perilous missions with complete success."

== Footnotes ==
Preceded by Georges Guynemer	Top Flying Ace; France, World War I	Succeeded by Charles Nungesser
