= Escadrille 67 =

Escadrille N 67 - SPA 67
- Active: 1915
- Country: France
- Branch: French Air Service
- Type: Reconnaissance/Fighter
- Engagements: World War I

Escadrille 67 of the French Air Force was founded at Lyon-Bron Airport during the First World War, on 17 September 1915. On 24 September, they were assigned to the IV Armee of the French Army. By late October, the escadrille was assigned to the defense of Verdun.

== History ==
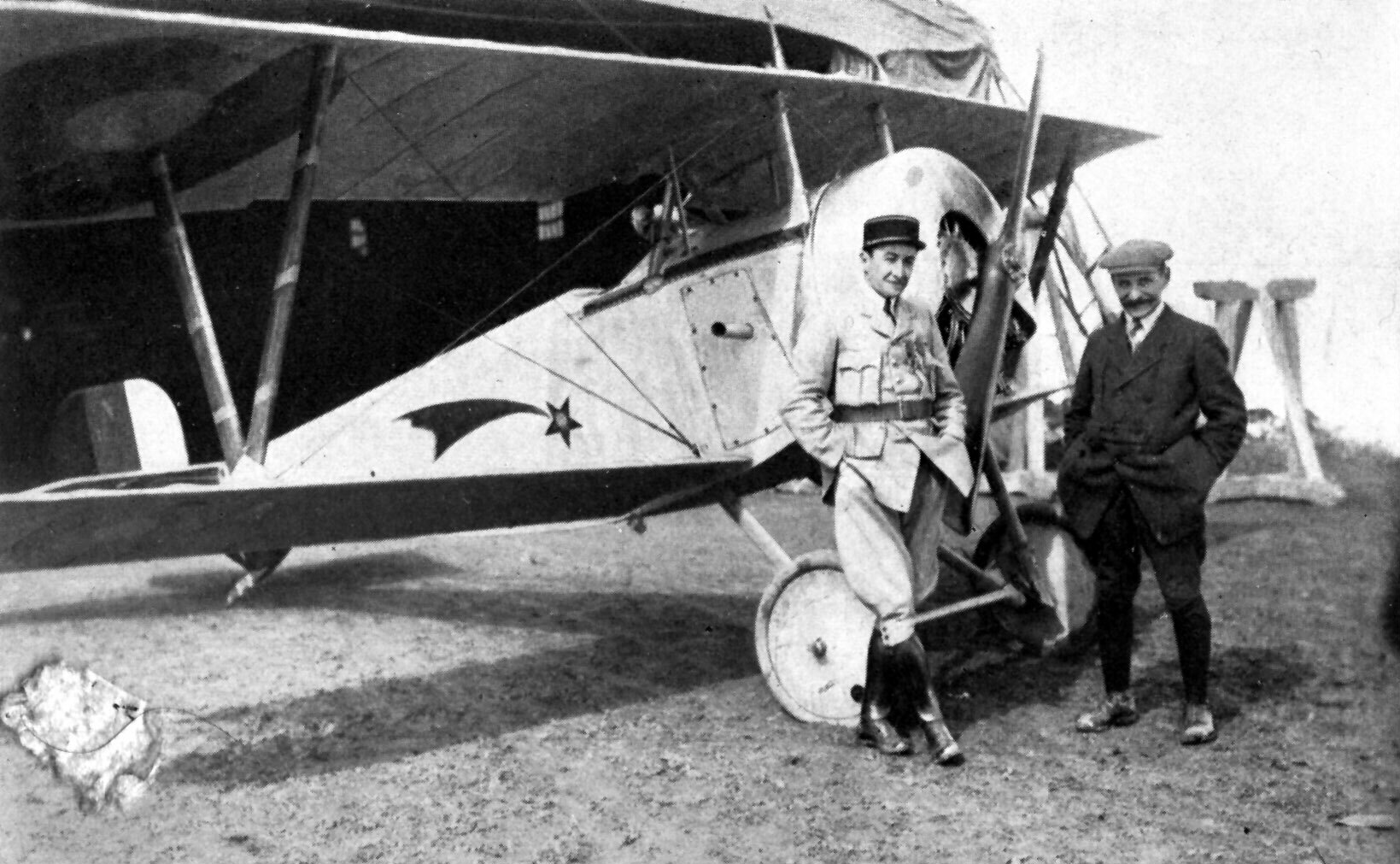
A Nieuport 11, the first French single-seat fighter.

Dubbed Escadrille N67 for the Nieuport two-seaters they operated, the new unit performed numerous reconnaissance, photographic, artillery direction, and bombing missions. For their efforts, they were cited on 25 January 1916. In July, they were cited a second time, for engaging in 257 combats and downing 11 enemy aircraft. The second citation entitled the unit to wear a fourragere denoting a unit award of the Croix de Guerre; Escadrille N 67 was the first aerial unit to win this award. During that Summer of 1916, the escadrille traded its two-seaters for Nieuport single-seater fighters. On 1 November 1916, the unit would be incorporated into Groupe de Combat 13, joining Escadrille 65, Escadrille 112, and Escadrille N.124.

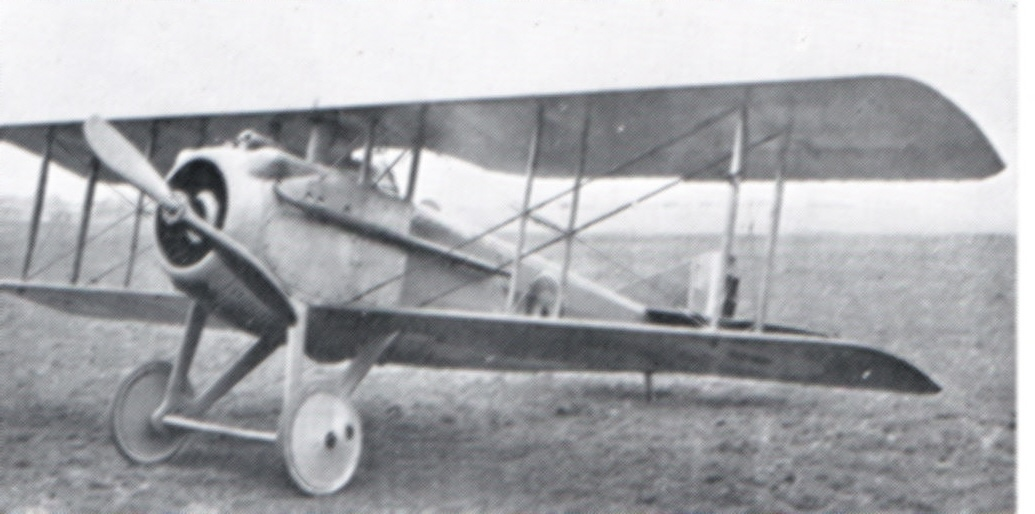
A SPAD S.VII single-seat fighter .

After service with GC 13, the escadrille was detached from the groupe on 1 June 1917. It was assigned to an ad hoc Groupe Provisoire de Bonneuil subordinated to III Armee. After 1 August 1917, the escadrille re-equipped with SPAD fighters, becoming Escadrille SPA.67. On 18 January 1918, it was posted to replace Escadrille 73 in Groupe de Combat 12. Escadrille SPA 67 remained with GC 12 until war's end. The escadrille was credited with 42 victories during the war.

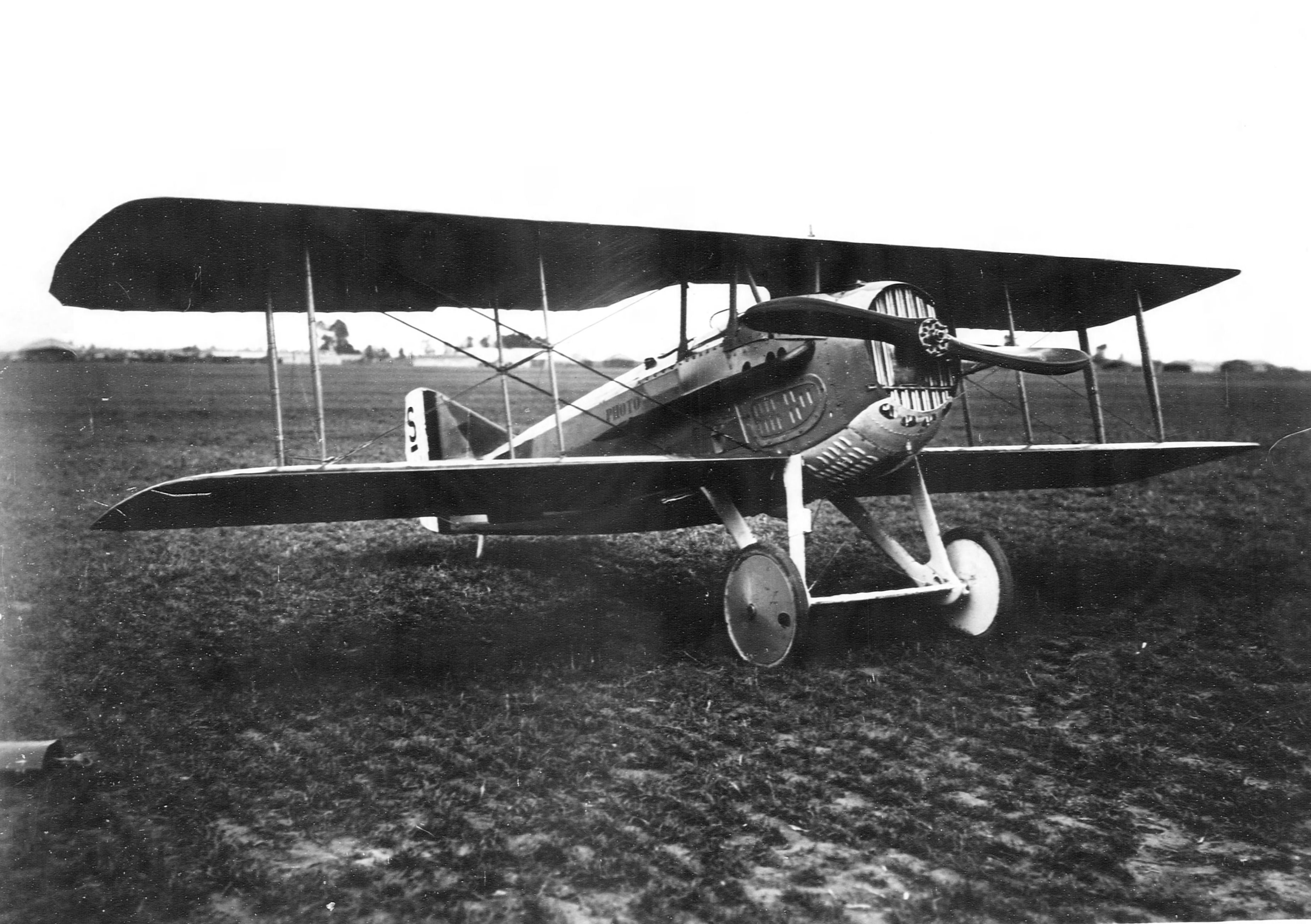
A SPAD S.XIII, typical of the escadrille's equipment.

Escadrille SPA 67 remains an active part of the French Air Force.

== Commanding officers ==
- Sous lieutenant Mathieu Tenant de la Tour 17 September 1915 - 20 September 1915
- Capitaine Olivier Galouzeau de Villepin: 21 September 1915 - 21 February 1916
- Capitaine Henri Constans de Saint-Sauveur: 22 February 1916 - 31 July 1917
- Capitaine Jacques d'Indy: 1 August 1917 - 5 April 1919

== Notable personnel ==
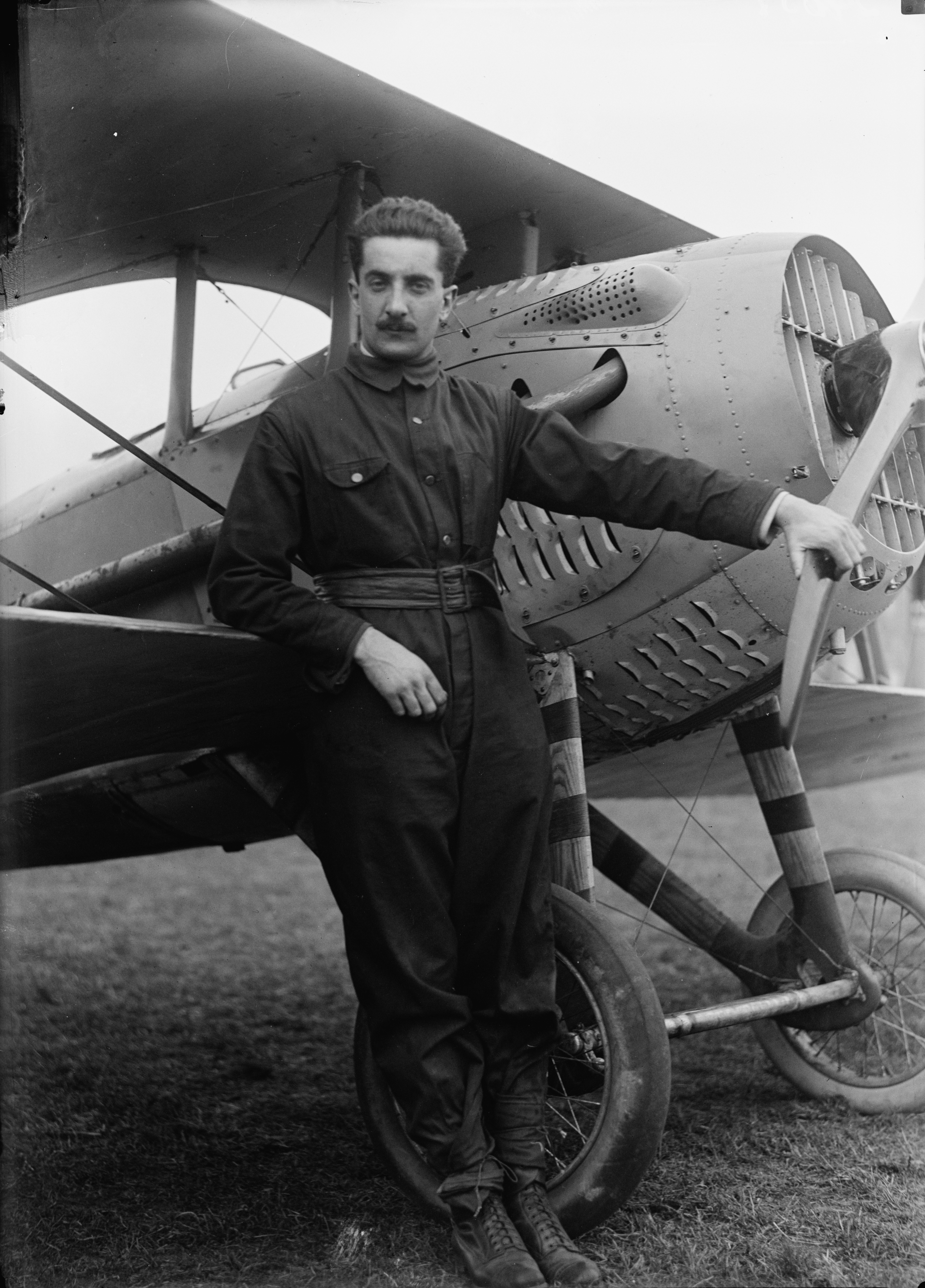
Georges Flachaire, one of the squadron's aces.

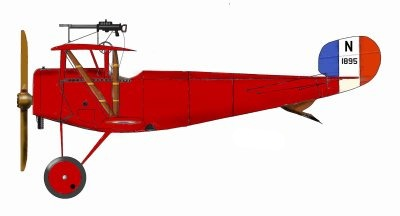
Jean Navarre was the original ace to paint his airplane scarlet.

- Sous lieutenant Jean Navarre
- Sous lieutenant Georges Flachaire
- Sous lieutenant Marcel Vialet
- Lieutenant David Endicott Putnam
- Sous lieutenant Mathieu Tenant de la Tour

== Aircraft ==
- Nieuport
- SPAD
