= Jean Matton =

Jean Georges Fernand Matton
- Born: 27 October 1888; Saint-Maur-des-Fossés, France
- Died: 10 September 1917 (aged 28)
- Military career
- Allegiance: France
- Branch: Cavalry; aviation
- Rank: Capitaine
- Units: 30e Regiment de Dragons; Escadrille 20; Escadrille 57; Escadrille 77
- Commands: Escadrille 48
- Awards: Legion d'honneur Croix de Guerre; Mentioned in Dispatches four times

Capitaine Jean Georges Fernand Matton was a French World War I cavalryman and flying ace. He was credited with nine confirmed and two unconfirmed aerial victories.

== Biography ==
=== Early life ===
Jean Georges Fernand Matton was born in Saint-Maur-des-Fossés on 27 October 1888.

== Military service ==
Matton began World War I as a cavalryman. He earned a Mention in Dispatches for his performance, followed by an award of the Legion d'honneur on 5 January 1915. His award citation read, "Ignoring a serious wound incurred during the course of a reconnaissance, he transmitted the vitally important information that he had gathered."

He then undertook aviation training, receiving Military Pilot's Brevet No. 2349 on 14 January 1916. At first he was posted to Escadrille MF20 (the 'MF' denoting the unit's use of Maurice Farman airplanes). On 23 July 1916, he was transferred to Escadrille N57. Five days later, he scored his first aerial victory, sharing it with Georges Lachmann and Georges Flachaire. This garnered Matton another Mention in Dispatches. On 2 October 1916, he was transferred to command Escadrille 48. He scored his first victory there (second overall) on 15 December.

Victory number three for Matton was a German observation balloon, destroyed on 16 February 1917. Matton would continue to score, right up until he joined Armand de Turenne in a double win on 9 July, for his final victories. Both his fifth and sixth wins had earned him Mentions in Dispatches.

Capitaine Jean Georges Fernand Matton was killed in action in defense of his nation on 10 September 1917.
