= Georges Lachmann =

French flying ace

Georges Marcel Lachmann
- Born: 10 August 1890; Paris, France
- Died: 12 August 1961 (aged 71); Tonnerre, France
- Military career
- Allegiance: France
- Branch: Aviation
- Rank: Capitaine
- Units: 2eme Groupe d'Aviation, Escadrille REP27, Escadrille 15, Escadrille 57, Ecadrille 92/392
- Commands: Escadrille 581, Escadrille 406
- Awards: Légion d'honneur, Médaille militaire, Croix de Guerre with ten palmes, Italian Croce di Guerra and Order of the Crown of Italy, Russian Order of Saint George

Capitaine Georges Marcel Lachmann was a French World War I flying ace. He was credited with nine confirmed aerial victories.

== World War I ==
On 21 July 1914, Georges Marcel Lachman was awarded the civil pilot's license he had earned. On 2 August 1914, as France began World War I, Sergeant Lachmann reported to duty with the 2eme Group d'Aviation and received Military Pilot's Brevet No. 499. He would be one of the rare aces who began and ended World War I with aviation, and he served on all major fronts of the war.

He was first assigned to Escadrille 27; it was while he was with them he flew his first war mission, on 31 August. In January 1915, he was transferred to Escadrille 15, which was also operating Robert Esnault-Pelterie K-80 airplanes. On 8 March 1915, he was promoted to Adjutant. A month later, he was retrained on different airplanes. On 26 May 1915, he continued his peripatetic career by being posted to Escadrille 57 on the Western Front in France. On 31 July 1915, he was commissioned as a Sous lieutenant. On 13 August 1915, he was transferred to Escadrille 92 on the Italian Front. At first, he was only one of three pilots and three observers assigned to fly Nieuport 10s in defense of Venice, though later Escadrille 92 gained three more pilots. He was a major participant in the hour's air combat of 15 October 1915 that discouraged further Austro-Hungarian raids on the city.

On 24 March 1916, he returned to the Western Front and Escadrille 57. On 15 July 1916, Lachmann scored his first aerial victory, using a Nieuport to destroy an enemy observation balloon over Ham. On 28 July, he teamed with Georges Flachaire and Jean Matton to share in a win over an Albatros two-seater observation plane. On 12 August 1916, Lachmann downed another foe.

Georges Marcel Lachmann was inducted into the Légion d'honneur on 6 January 1917. On 21 March 1917, Lachmann was posted to the Russian Front to serve in Escadrille 581 as a Spad pilot. He was wounded in action on 26 June 1917. On 8 July 1917, he assumed command of the squadron. During September and October 1917, he scored six victories, three over enemy airplanes and three as a balloon buster. On 24 December 1917, he was promoted to Lieutenant.

On 7 January 1918, Lachmann's command expanded to include a second squadron, Escadrille 406. In February 1918, he was withdrawn from Russia. In April, he was posted as an advisor to the military attaché in Leghorn, Italy. In August, he returned to Russia; in November, he was back in France.

== Post World War I ==
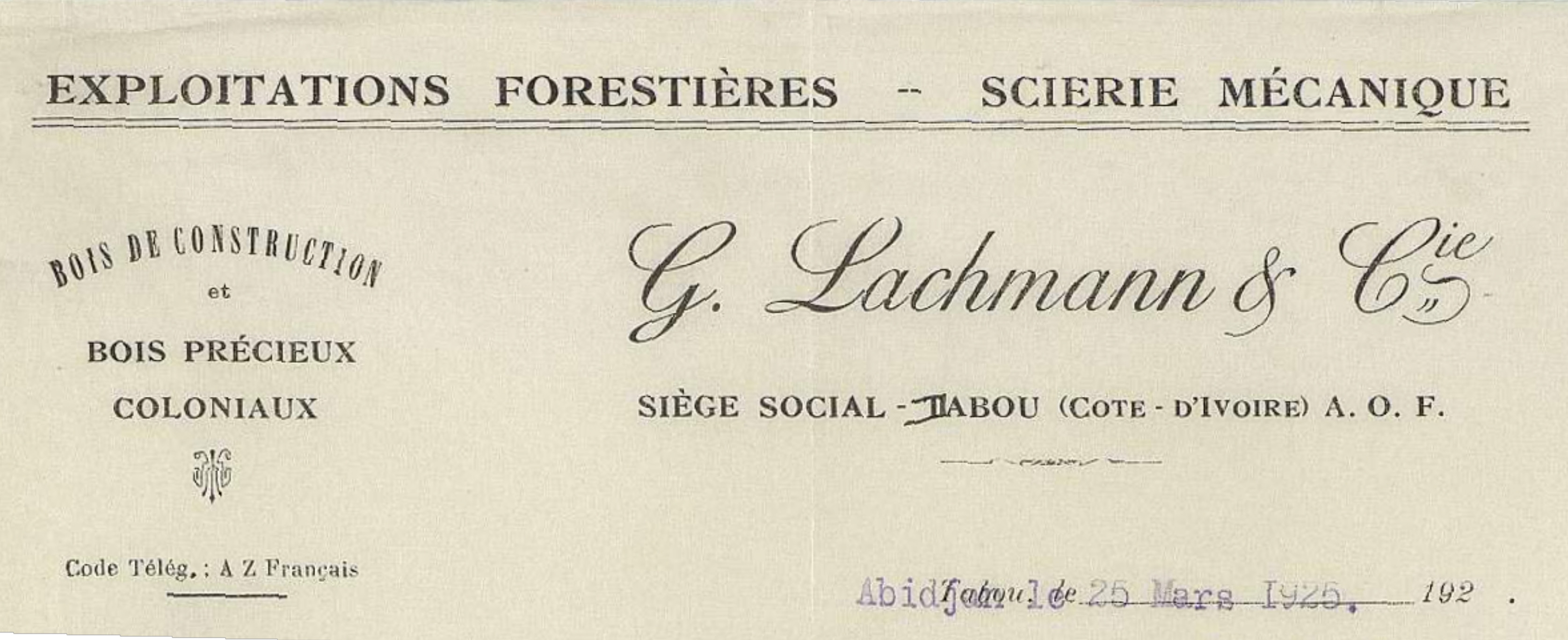
Company for the exploitation of colonial products, (formerly Établissements G. Lachmann), Abidjan: Logging, sawmilling, coffee, cocoa

Lachmann went to Africa, and spent some time surveying landing fields. In 1923, he had completed a 6400 kilometre flight from Dakar via Bamako, Ouagadougou, Bamako, Bouakié, Bamako to Dakar, with a single plane and a single mechanic and without "breaking wood".

He founded the Établissements G. Lachmann & C^{ie} in Abidjan, which later changed its name to Société d'Exploitation de Produits Coloniaux (S.E.P.C.) and was involved in forest exploitation by logging and sawmilling as well as the agricultural exploitation by cultivating coffee and cocoa.

His erseverance, tenacity and constant energy in the endeavour as a pilot were reflected in the management style of Lachmann's sawmill in Abidjan on the shores of Banco Bay, which was described as a model. Until his forestry operations were fully utilised, Lachmann aimed to saw tropical timber for the ever-increasing local demand in the French colony, which would also be easy to export if necessary.

The sawmill and the boilers were set up in two large halls. The equipment consisted of:

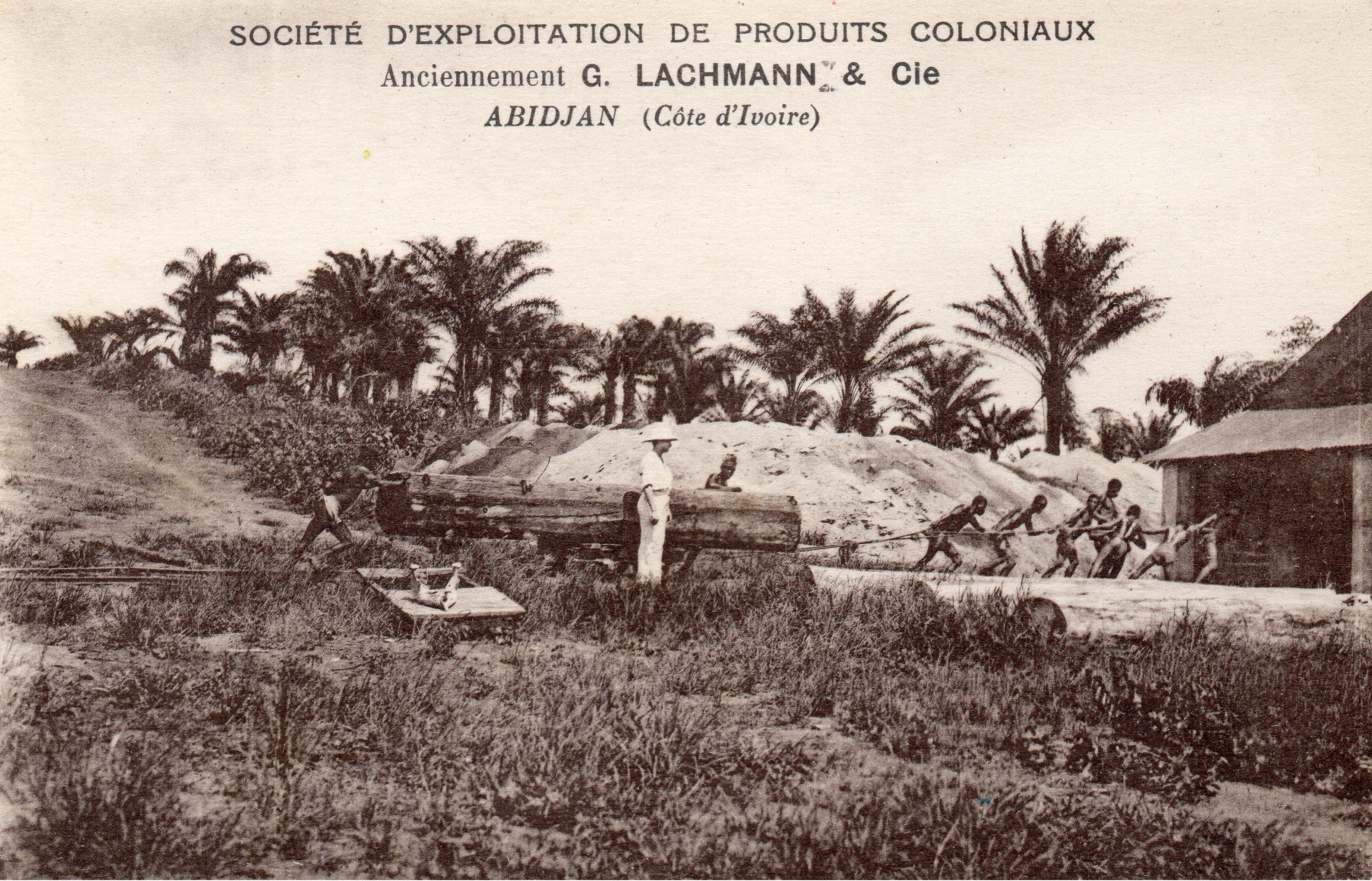
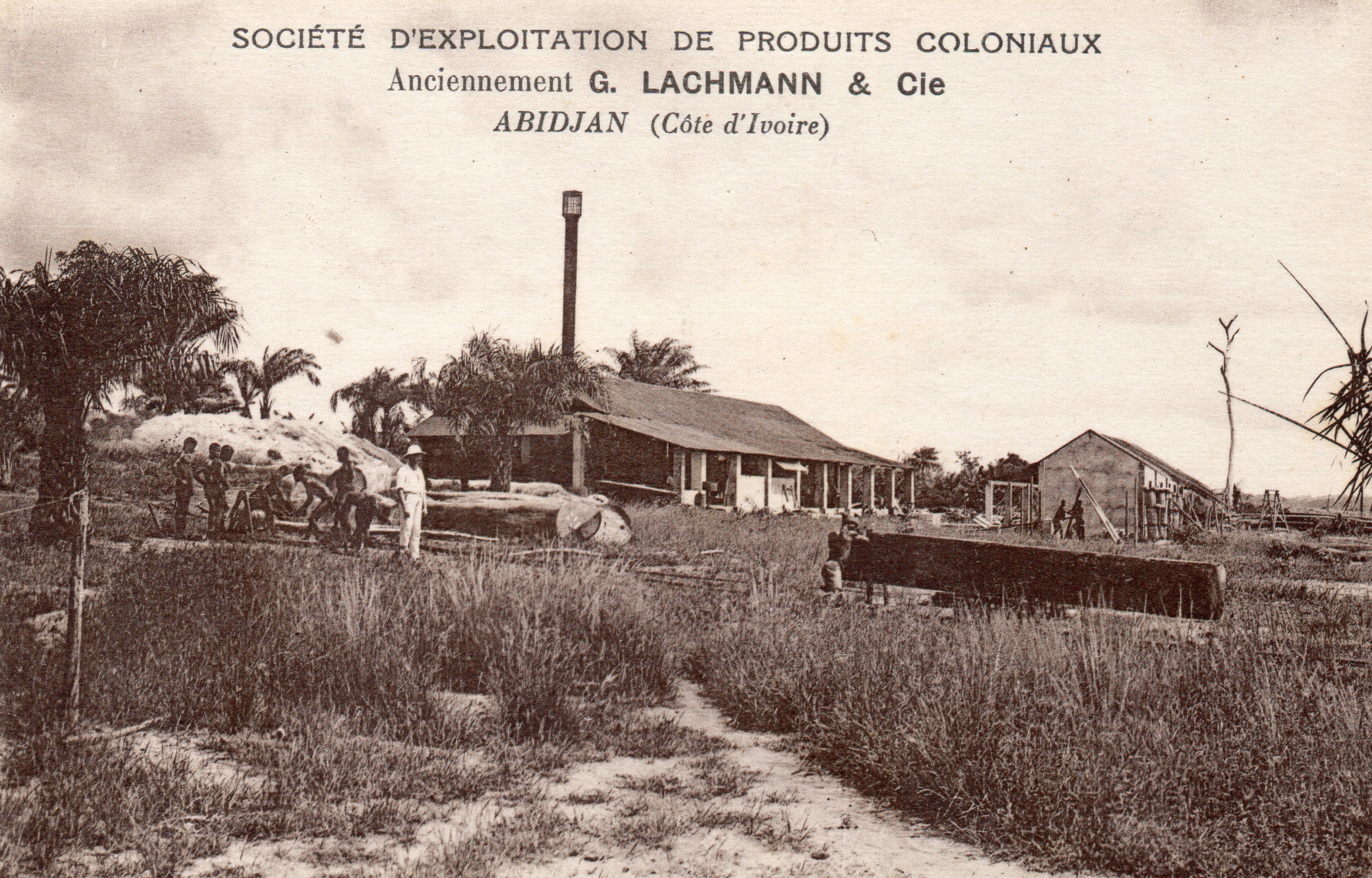
The hand-operated Decauville railway of G. Lachmann sawmill
- A Clark double circular saw with a capacity of 1.25 m × 8.50 m, with 4-claw carriage and automatic retraction, which enabled a high cutting speed
- A Tower triple circular saw that cut the large panels of the previous saw into planks and rafters (automatic feed)
- A circular saw with automatic carriage especially for boards and battens from banana boxes
- A chainsaw with a pendulum.

The timber and finished products were transported from one machine to another by automatic conveyors with controlled rollers. An 8-tonne steam boiler with a heating surface of 140 square metres, of a design similar to that of steam locomotives, supplied the steam for an 85 hp steam engine with a very powerful flywheel and underground transmission shafts to the various machines.

The plant in which the modern machines were housed allowed a throughput of 20 cubic metres of finished products per ten-hour day. Even if this had been halved, the yield would still have been considerable and sufficient to be profitable and to provide all possible uses for the various and numerous types of timber and to supply the export market, as many ships favoured sawn timber over logs as cargo. The sawmill was connected to the Ébrié lagoon by a hand-operated, narrow gauge Decauville railway.

He died at Tonnerre on 12 August 1961.

== Honours and awards ==
Légion d'honneur
Médaille militaire
Croix de Guerre with ten palmes
Croce di Guerra (Italy)
Knight of the Order of the Crown of Italy
Knight of the Order of Saint George 4th Class (Russia) (31.10.1917)

== Bibliography ==
- Cony, Christophe (April 1996). "Un as français: Georges Lachmann (1^{e} partie)" [A French Ace: Georges Lachmann]. Avions: Toute l'aéronautique et son histoire (in French) (37): 19–22. ISSN 1243-8650.
- Cony, Christophe (May 1996). "Un as français: Georges Lachmann (2^{e} partie)". Avions: Toute l'aéronautique et son histoire (in French) (38): 30–36. ISSN 1243-8650.
