= Georges Flachaire =

French flying ace

Georges Charles Marie François Flachaire
- Born: 24 October 1892; Grasse, France
- Died: 30 April 1973 (aged 80); Caracas, Venezuela
- Military career
- Allegiance: France
- Branch: Artillery; aviation
- Rank: Sous lieutenant
- Units: Escadrille 67, Escadrille 105
- Awards: Légion d'honneur, Médaille militaire, Croix de Guerre, British Military Cross
- Other work: Served entirety of World War II

Sous lieutenant Georges Charles Marie François Flachaire (24 October 1892—30 April 1973) was a French World War I flying ace credited with eight aerial victories. On 1 September 1939, he returned to French military service, to serve past the end of World War II.

== Early life ==
Georges Charles Marie François Flachaire was born in Grasse, France on 24 October 1892. He was recalled to military service when World War I began.

== World War I ==
Flachaire joined the artillery in 1914. He soon volunteered for aviation, transferring on 31 December 1914. On 15 January 1915, he was assigned to Escadrille 105. On 10 May 1915, Flachaire departed for initial aviation training at Avord. Promotions followed, as he moved through the phases of pilot's training. He received his pilot's brevet, No. 957, on 31 August 1915.

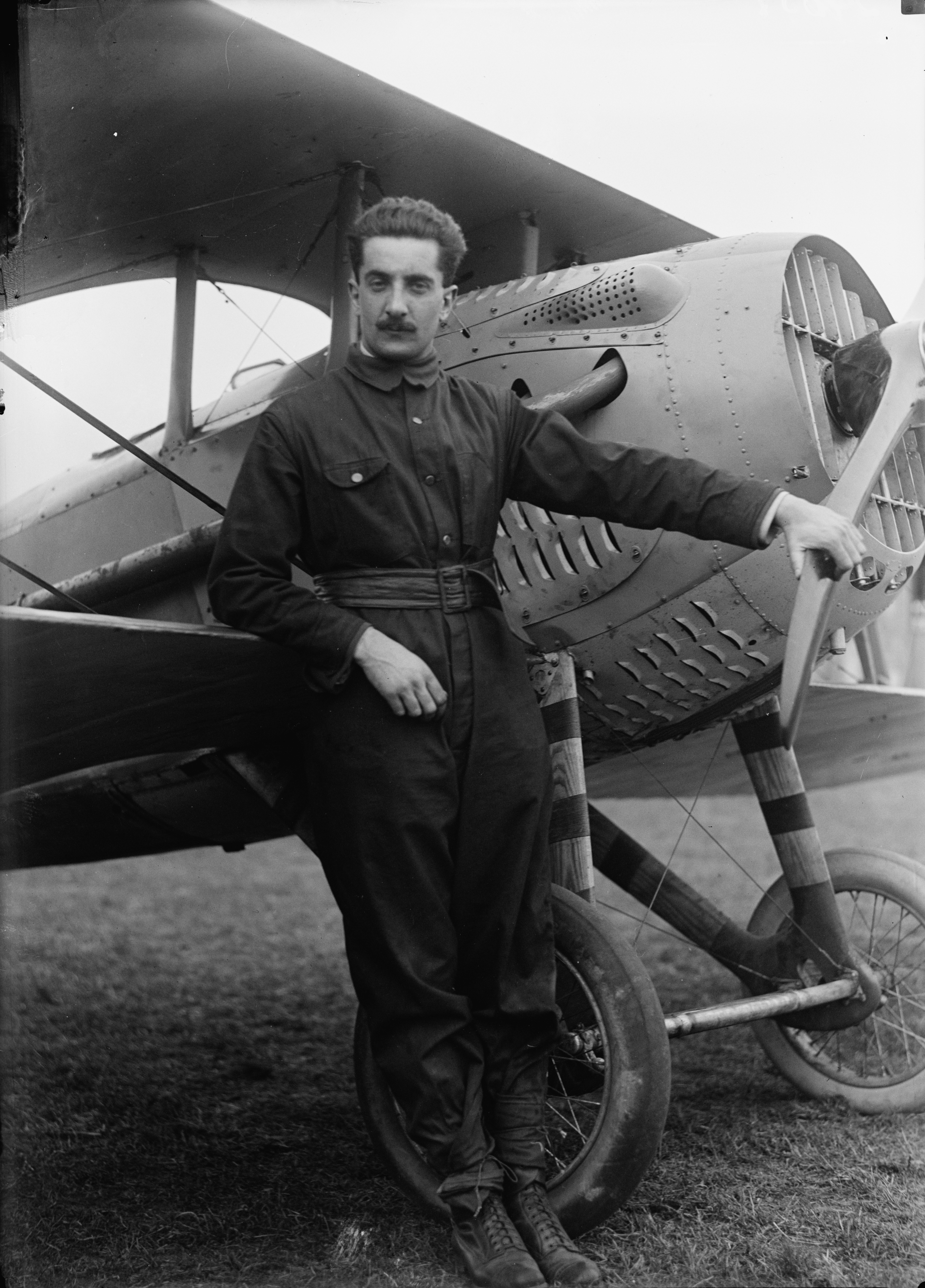
Georges Flachaire and his SPAD XIII.

Flachaire was posted to Escadrille 67 on 1 September 1915. He piloted two-seater Nieuports until the new single-seated fighters showed up. On 20 December 1915, he was promoted to Marechal-des-logis. He then scored his first triumph on 30 April 1916, earning the Médaille militaire by his actions. His next victory, on 28 July 1916, was shared with Georges Lachmann and Jean Matton. He scored once in September, three times in October, and notched his seventh on 23 November 1916. He was awarded the British Military Cross on 8 May 1917. He scored one last win on 17 August 1917.

With a temporary promotion to Sous lieutenant, Flachaire was sent to the United States as part of a French military mission in October 1917. The war would end before his return.

== Post World War I ==
Flachaire would return to his nation's military service at the beginning of World War II, on 1 September 1939. He would serve until his release from the reserves on 24 October 1945.

He retired to Caracas, Venezuela, and died there on 30 October 1973.

== Honors and awards ==
Médaille militaire
(Per Ordre No. 2891 D of 10 May 1916)
"On 30 April 1916, he attacked an enemy plane that was bombing our positions. After a serious combat during which he ran out of ammunition and fuel, he manoeuvred so adroitly that he forced his adversary to land in our lines where the pilot and observer were made prisoners. Already cited in Orders."

Légion d'honneur
(Per Ordre No. 4090 D of 18 November 1916)
"Remarkable pilot of skill, courage and audacity, which he displayed during recent operations, during the course of which he provided the most highly conspicuous services. On 20 and 21 October 1916, he downed, in the most brilliant fashion, his fourth and fifth enemy planes. The first in our lines and the second in the German Lines. Médaille militaire and cited in orders three times."
