= Cierva C.6 =

Autogyro designed by Juan de la Cierva

C.6
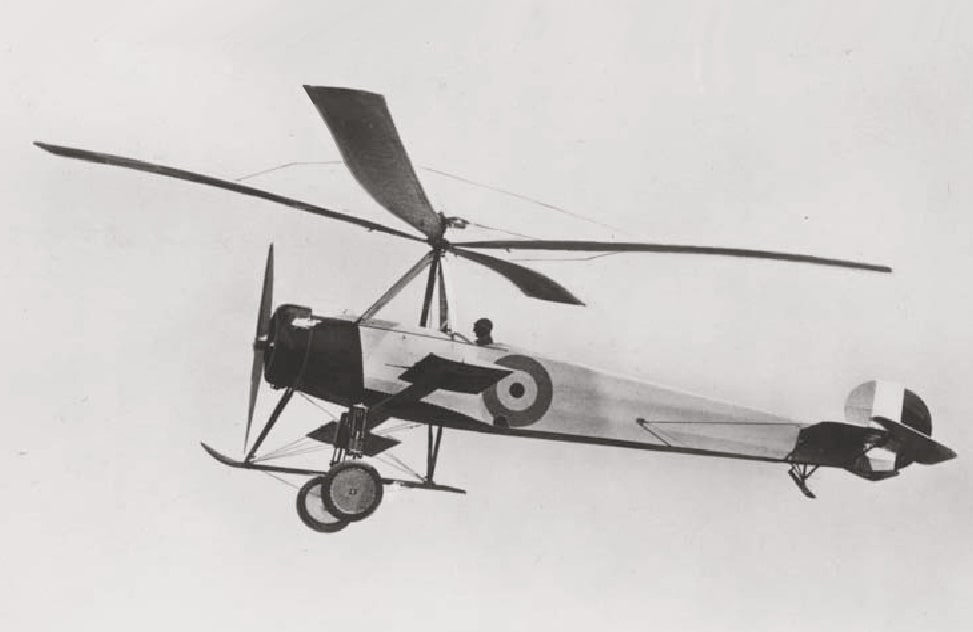
- Cierva C.6 autogyro taking off

General information
- Type: Autogyro
- Manufacturer: Cierva
- Designer: Juan de la Cierva
- Number built: 1

History
- First flight: March 1924
- Developed from: Cierva C.5

The Cierva C.6 was the sixth autogyro designed by engineer Juan de la Cierva, and the first one to travel a "major" distance. Cierva, the engineer responsible for the invention of the autogyro, had spent all his funds on the research and creation of his first five prototypes. Therefore, in 1923, he turned to the Cuatro Vientos Aerodynamics Laboratory chief, Commander Emilio Herrera, who succeeded in persuading General Francisco Echagüe, the director of the Military Aviation Aeronautics Department, to take over the second stage in the research and development of Cierva's autogyros.

After several wind tunnel tests, Military Aviation built a Cierva C.6 autogyro in an Avro 504 frame. This machine, piloted by Captain Joaquín Loriga Taboada, made three flights, all of them in March 1924. One of those flights, the eight-minute trip from Cuatro Vientos airfield to Getafe airfield (10.5 km or 6.5 miles), was considered a giant step for Cierva's autogyros.

The Cierva C.6 prototype was fitted with ailerons mounted on two small wings, also with elevators and a rudder. This complete three-axis control scheme was needed because the pilot had only limited control over the rotor. The engine powered the propeller at the front while the rotor on top was unpowered, driven instead by air flowing upward through the inner region of the rotor disc. This meant that the aircraft, like all autogyros, could not hover. But so long as there was sufficient airflow to turn the rotor the aircraft could safely descend, even at low airspeeds where a conventional airplane would stall and possibly crash.

A replica of the Cierva C.6 was built to be shown in Murcia pavilion in Seville Expo '92 World's Fair. That replica can be now be seen in Museo del Aire (Spain), Cuatro Vientos, Madrid, Spain.

== Variants ==
Cierva C.6
Prototype.
Cierva C.6A
Powered by an 82 kW (110 hp) Le Rhône 9Ja rotary piston engine.
Cierva C.6B
Cierva C.6C
Powered by a 97 kW (130 hp) Clerget 9B rotary piston engine. Built in the United Kingdom as Avro Type 574.
Cierva C.6D
Powered by a 97 kW (130 hp) Clerget 9B rotary piston engine. Built in the United Kingdom as the Avro Type 575.

== Specifications (C.6) ==
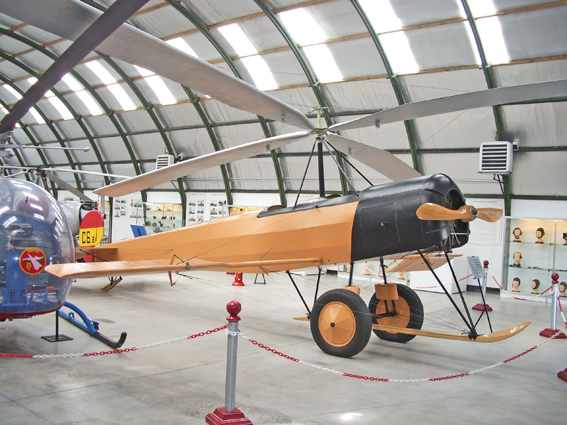
Cierva C.6 replica at the Museo del Aire, Spain

General characteristics

- Crew: one to two
- Length: 29 ft 6 in (9 m)
- Max takeoff weight: 1,984 lb (900 kg)
- Powerplant: 1 × Le Rhône 9Ja 9-cyl. air-cooled rotary piston engine, 110 hp (82 kW)
- Main rotor diameter: 32 ft 10 in (10 m)
- Main rotor area: 845.5 sq ft (78.55 m^{2})
- Propellers: two-bladed wooden propeller

Performance

- Maximum speed: 54 kn (62 mph, 100 km/h)

== See also ==
Related lists

- List of experimental aircraft
