= Georges Pelletier d'Oisy =

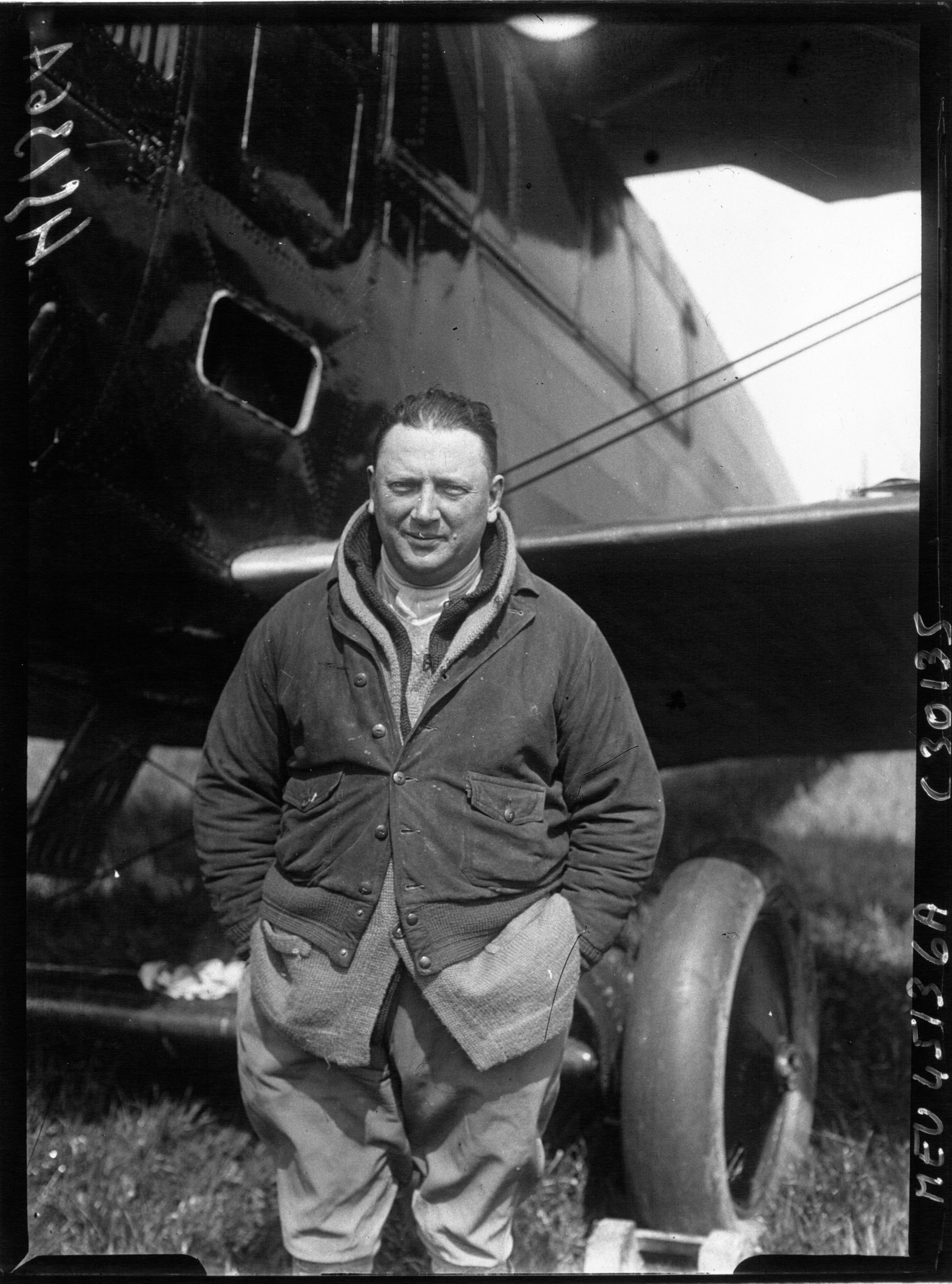
- Pelletier-Doisy in 1927
- Born: 9 March 1892; Auch, France
- Died: 10 May 1953 (aged 61); Marrakesh, Morocco
- Military career
- Allegiance: France
- Branch: French Air Service
- Rank: Capitaine
- Nickname: Pivolo
- Units: Escadrille HF.19; Escadrille MS.12; Escadrille N.69
- Awards: Légion d'honneur Médaille militaire Croix de Guerre

Capitaine Georges Pelletier d'Oisy (1892–1953) was a French aviator and World War I ace. He attempted a circumnavigation of the world in 1924. Pelletier d'Oisy began his aviation career as a World War I flying ace credited with five aerial victories.

== Biography ==
=== Early life and training ===
Georges Pelletier D'Oisy was born in Auch on 9 March 1892. He enlisted for five years on 23 May 1910. He served as a Dragoon until 14 October 1912, when he entered pilot training. He graduated with Military Pilot's Brevet No. 284 on 18 June 1913, and was posted to Escadrille HF.19 on 1 July.

=== World War I service ===
When the First World War began, Pelletier d'Oisy was serving with Escadrille HF.19. On 20 November 1914, he received one of the first Médaille militaires awarded in the war.

He transferred to Escadrille MS.12 on 1 March 1915. On 2 April, he scored one of the first aerial victories in history when he shot down an Albatros reconnaissance plane. Six days later, he was appointed as a Chevalier de la Legion d'honneur. On 27 September, he was promoted from the ranks to be a Sous lieutenant.

He scored two more aerial victories, on 12 and 17 May 1916. On 18 May he was transferred to a fighter squadron, Escadrille N.69. He and Jean Navarre teamed to shoot down a German Fokker on 18 June 1916 for d'Oisy's fourth victory. He would score a fifth victory to become a flying ace on 11 May 1917. On 27 September, he became a full Lieutenant.

On 30 December 1917, he was withdrawn from his squadron to serve on the staff of Groupe de Combat 16. He would serve in this position until 26 October 1918, when he was posted back to his former unit, now known as Escadrille Spa.69.

=== Aviation record activities ===
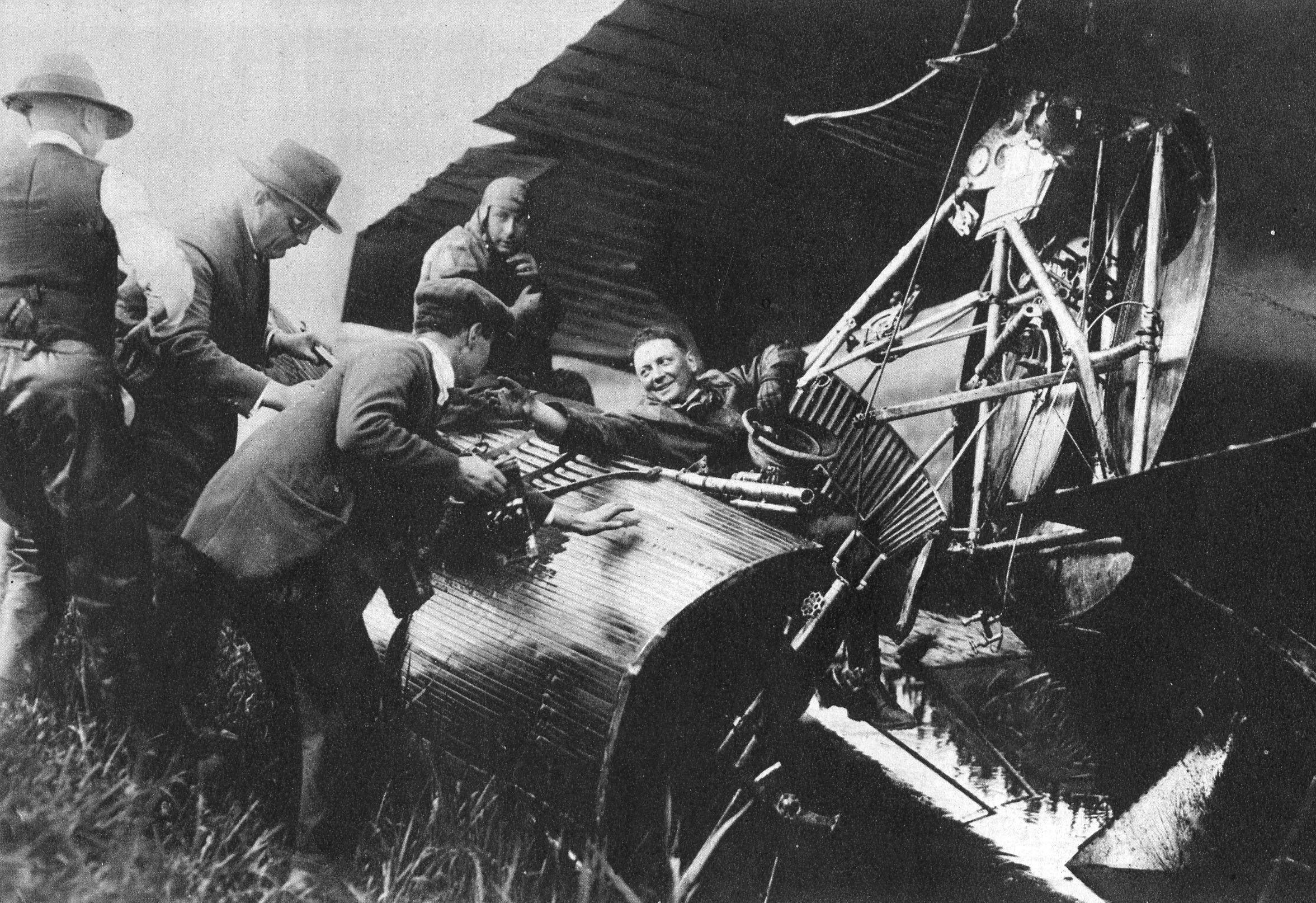
Pelletier-Doisy emerging from his crashed Breguet in Shanghai

On 24 April 1924, Pelletier d'Oisy and Adjutant Lucien Besin departed Paris eastbound in a Breguet 19.A.2 in an attempt to fly around the world. Their attempt ended when they crashed their airplane on a golf course in Shanghai, China on 20 May 1924. They had covered 10,580 miles (17,037 km) in 26 days.

Pelletier d'Oisy was in Hong Kong when a British Royal Air Force team of aviators making an eastbound attempt to circumnavigate the world arrived there on 30 June 1924, and he traded flying stories with Squadron Leader Archibald Stuart-MacLaren and Flying Officer William Plenderleith of the British team. While in Shanghai, he reunited with Zhu Binhou, a fellow ace of the French Air Service whom Pelletier d'Oisy had previously met in France. With Zhu in charge of the Anhui clique's air corps at the time, he could lend Pelletier d'Oisy a Breguet 14, allowing him to depart for Japan. Pelletier d'Oisy arrived in Tokyo on 17 July 1924. The entire trip from Paris to Tokyo had taken 120 hours in the air over 84 days.

In June 1925, flying a Blériot-SPAD S.61, he won the Michelin Cup, completing the 2,835 km (1,762 mi) course in 15hr 8 min.

During the interwar period, joyful and talkative Pelletier d'Oisy was a popular character in France, best known by his nickname of Pivolo (phonetical pun for Pie-vole-haut -High flies the magpie- which his comrades-in-arms had coined after his habit as a flight instructor to always end a briefing by telling greener recruits the catchphrase :"et p(u)is vole haut", stressing the importance of starting air combat with an altitude advantage. A popular brand of Vermouth with an iconic poster and label by Art-Deco artist Adolphe Mouron Cassandre, was named after him. As of 2023 a bar-Restaurant in Toulouse (capital city of his native Gascony) still honours his name

=== World War II and beyond ===
Having served in both Indochina and Tunisia, d'Oisy rose to the rank of General by the end of the Second World War. He died in Morocco on 10 May 1953.

== Honors ==
- Chevalier of the Legion d'honneur: 8 April 1915 (later raised to Commandeur) in the Legion
- Medaille Militaire: 20 November 1914
- Croix de Guerre with four palmes and an etoile de vermeil
- The inaugural Harmon Trophy in 1926
