= Eric Martin (Middlesex cricketer) =

English cricketer (1894–1924)

Eric Martin (20 May 1894 – 2 May 1924) was an English first-class cricketer active 1919–23 who played for Middlesex. He was born in Barnet and educated at Christ's College, Finchley. He played intermittently for Middlesex between 1919 and 1923 as a lower middle-order batsman without making any real impact. His best score was 64 against Essex at Leyton in 1919, when he helped add 152 for the ninth wicket in an hour and a quarter. He was captain of Finchley CC and a prominent member of the Casuals FC. He was killed in an airplane collision at Duxford Aerodrome.
