= Oscar Monthan =

American aeronautical engineer (1885–1924)

Oscar Monthan (1885–1924) was an American aeronautical engineer.

== Early life and education ==
Born in Dewsbury, England, Oscar Monthan moved with his family to Canada and then, in 1900, to Arizona, the United States. The Monthan Family ranched along the Tanque Verde River until 1915 when they purchased a ranch in Vail, Arizona along the Cienega Creek. There the family diverted water from the creek to create a lake for irrigation. The ranch was later known as Rancho De Lago.

When the U.S. entered World War I in 1917, Oscar and two of his brothers; Eric and Carl, enlisted in the Army Air Corps.

In 1918, Oscar graduated from the Boston School of Technology and also received his pilot's wings that year. In 1920, he became the Chief Engineer at Rockwell Field in San Diego, California. By 1921, Oscar was involved in the latest advances in Aeronautical Engineering in Dayton, Ohio. In 1922, he was in charge of the Air Corps Engineering School at McCook Field in Dayton, Ohio.

== Career ==
In these early years of the Army Air Corps (according to the History of the 8th Air Force, July–December 1948), Lt. Oscar Monthan was known as one of the best and foremost engineers. During this time he became acquainted with General Billy Mitchell. According to Oscar’s brother, Guy Monthan, who passed the family history on to his son George, General Mitchell and Oscar enjoyed fishing together on the lake at the Monthan ranch when they were on leave.

In 1922, Oscar married Mae Pouqette. At the time, Mae was an Army nurse. In 1923, Oscar was Chief Engineer at Luke Field in Hawaii near Honolulu. It was also about the same time General Mitchell was reassigned to the Territory of Hawaii. At this time Oscar was considered one of the Army’s finest aeronautical engineers and was a founding member of the Order of the Daedaleans.

== Death ==
On March 27, 1924 Oscar and four other airmen died in the crash of their Martin MB-2 bomber while on a training mission. Only 15 of these bombers were made by the Army for Night Bombardment-Short Distance. It was also the bomber that General Mitchell used in the famous ship bombing trials flying out of Langley Field Virginia in 1921. These Martin Bombers sank a destroyer, cruiser and a battleship to prove air power's worth in aerial bombardment

== Legacy ==
A street on Hickam Air Force Base in Honolulu, Hawaii is named “Monthan Street,” in honor of Oscar Monthan.

On September 23, 1927 Charles Lindbergh dedicated Davis-Monthan Air Field (now Air Force Base) in Tucson, in honor of Lt. Samuel Davis and Lt. Oscar Monthan. Oscar Monthan is buried in Tucson, Arizona.

== See also ==
- List of accidents and incidents involving military aircraft (pre-1925)
