= Jouy-sur-Morin =

- Commune
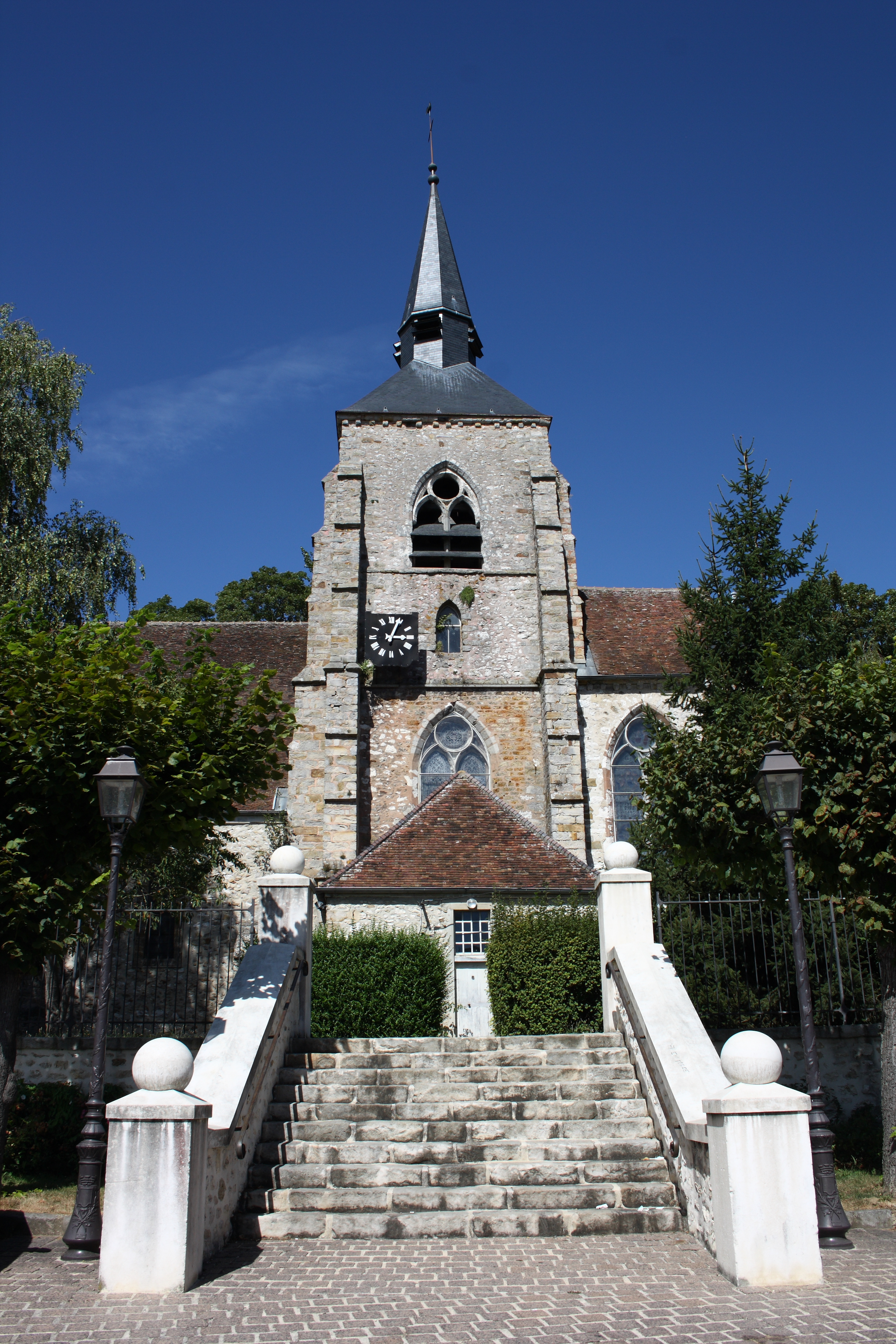
- The church in Jouy-sur-Morin

- Coat of arms
- Location of Jouy-sur-Morin
- Location within France Location within Île-de-France (region)
- Coordinates: 48°47′43″N 3°16′21″E
- Country: France
- Region: Île-de-France
- Department: Seine-et-Marne
- Arrondissement: Provins
- Canton: Coulommiers

Government
  - Mayor (2020–2026): Michael Rousseau
- Area^{1}: 18.45 km^{2} (7.12 sq mi)
- Highest elevation: 181 m (594 ft)
- Lowest elevation: 94 m (308 ft)
- Population (2023): 2,230
  - Density: 121/km^{2} (313/sq mi)
- Time zone: UTC+01:00 (CET)
  - Summer (DST): UTC+02:00 (CEST)
- INSEE/Postal code: 77240 /77320
- ^{1} French Land Register data, which excludes lakes, ponds, glaciers > 1 km^{2} (0.386 sq mi or 247 acres) and river estuaries.

Jouy-sur-Morin (French pronunciation: [ʒwi syʁ mɔʁɛ̃], literally Jouy on Morin) is a commune in the Seine-et-Marne department in the Île-de-France region in north-central France.

== Population ==
Historical population
Year	Pop.	±% p.a.
1968	1,504	—
1975	1,660	+1.42%
1982	1,637	−0.20%
1990	1,806	+1.24%
1999	1,929	+0.73%
2007	1,999	+0.45%
2012	2,176	+1.71%
2017	2,096	−0.75%
2023	2,230	+1.04%
Source: INSEE

Inhabitants are called Jouyssiens in French.

== See also ==
- Communes of the Seine-et-Marne department
