= Rowan Daly =

Rowan Heywood Daly
- Born: 30 March 1898; Trieste, Austria-Hungary
- Died: 5 June 1924 (aged 26); RAF Spittlegate, Grantham, Lincolnshire
- Military career
- Allegiance: United Kingdom
- Branch: British Army; Royal Navy; Royal Air Force
- Service years: 1914–1924
- Rank: Captain
- Nickname: Bill
- Units: London Regiment; Home Defence RNAS; No. 10 Squadron RNAS; No. 47 Squadron RAF; No. 100 Squadron RAF; No. 39 Squadron RAF
- Awards: Distinguished Service Cross; Distinguished Flying Cross

Captain Rowan Heywood Daly DSC, DFC (30 March 1898 – 5 June 1924) was a British flying ace credited with three aerial victories during World War I, and an additional four victories in Russia during 1919.

== Biography ==
Daly was born in Trieste, then a part of Austria-Hungary, to British parents Charles V. and Kate A. Daly.

In August 1914 Daly (then only 16½ years old) enlisted as a private in the 14th Battalion, London Regiment. In February 1915 he was transferred to an electrical engineering unit.

On 13 August 1916 he was commissioned into the Royal Naval Air Service as a probationary temporary flight sub-lieutenant. He was granted the Royal Aero Club Aviators Certificate No. 4450 at Royal Naval Air Station Chingford on 8 February 1917, and was confirmed in his rank on 11 May 1917.

On 7 July 1917 the Germans launched a daylight air raid against London. Twenty-two Gotha heavy bombers dropped bombs over the City and the East End, killing 57 people and injuring 193. The British flew 100 sorties in response, losing two fighters. Daly, flying a Sopwith Triplane in a RNAS Home Defence squadron, shot down a Gotha G.III fifteen miles off Ostend, gaining his first aerial victory. It was the only German loss during the raid. Daly subsequently received a mention in despatches, and in August was awarded the Distinguished Service Cross. His citation read:

Distinguished Service Cross
Flight Sub-Lieutenant Rowan Heywood Daly, RNAS.
For skill and gallantry in attacking enemy aircraft returning from a raid on England. After a long chase he engaged and brought down one machine in flames. Afterwards he engaged a second machine, but his gun jammed, and though he continued the pursuit to the enemy coast, he failed to clear the jam, and was obliged to return to his aerodrome.

Daly was then assigned to No. 10 Naval Squadron, flying the Sopwith Camel, gaining two more victories over Houthulst, Belgium, on 24 and 26 September, being wounded during the latter. In December 1917 he was promoted to flight lieutenant.

Daly was promoted to captain, and confirmed his rank on 21 January 1919. He served with 47 Squadron in South Russia from early 1919 to March 1920, taking part in operations supporting the White Army against the Red Army in the Russian Civil War, gaining four more victories in April and May 1919. He was awarded the Order of St. Vladimir (4th class) and the Cross of St. George (4th class) by the Russians, and also received the Distinguished Flying Cross in July 1920 for his Russian service.

Daly was granted a short service commission in the Royal Air Force on 4 August 1920 with the rank of flying officer. In 1922 he was serving with No. 100 Squadron based at RAF Spittlegate, near Grantham, Lincolnshire, and took part in the third RAF Aerial Pageant at Hendon Aerodrome in June, winning the Landing Competition – landing in a defined area 100 yd (91 m) square after stopping the engine at an altitude of 1,000 ft (300 m).

On 14 May 1923 Daly was transferred to 39 Squadron, also based at Spittlegate. On 5 June 1924 he was flying a DH.9A over the airfield when he was involved in a mid-air collision with another DH.9A of the squadron. Daly, his observer, and the crew of the other aircraft were killed.
