= Blériot-SPAD S.51 =

S.51
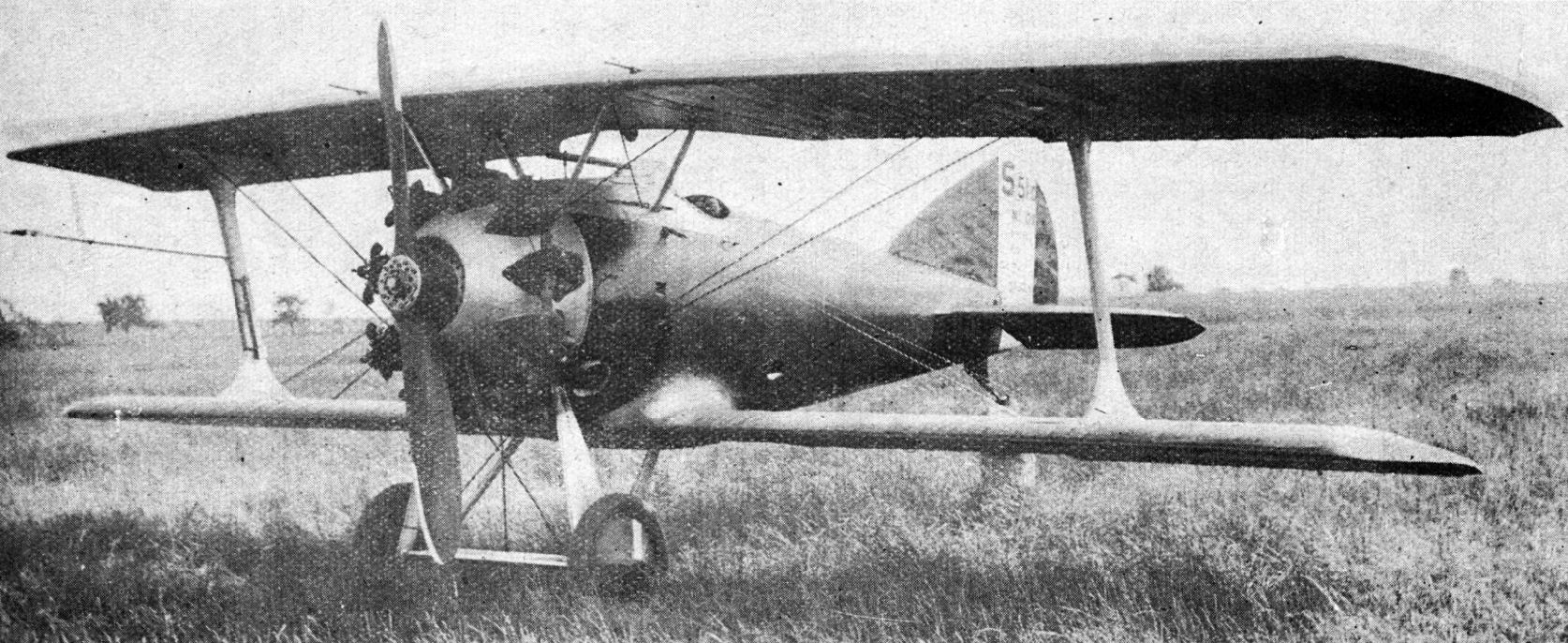

General information
- Type: Fighter
- Manufacturer: Blériot
- Designer: André Herbemont
- Primary users: Polish Air Force Turkish Air Force; Soviet Air Force
- Number built: ca. 60

History
- First flight: 16 June 1924

The Bleriot-SPAD S.51 was a French fighter aircraft developed in 1924 in response to a French Air Force requirement for an aircraft to replace their obsolete Nieuport-Delage NiD.29s.

== Design and development ==
Designed by André Herbemont, the S.51 shared its basic configuration with his other aircraft of the period, being a biplane with a swept upper wing and unswept lower wing, joined by I-shaped interplane struts. Unlike earlier designs, the S.51 used metal construction for the wings.

The prototype S.51 was rejected by the French authorities, but revised versions found export customers in the Polish Air Force, which bought 50 of them, and the Turkish and Soviet air forces which each bought a single example. Another development, the S.51/3, was experimentally fitted with the first controllable-pitch propeller developed in France, also designed by Herbemont.

== Variants ==
S.51
Prototype for French evaluation, 1x 280 kW (380 hp) Gnome et Rhône 9Aa radial engine.
S.51/2
Refined version exported to Poland, 1x 310 kW (420 hp) Gnome et Rhône 9Ab radial engine.
S.51/3
Prototype with variable-pitch propeller.
S.51/4
Export version for Turkey and the USSR with two extra machine guns in the wings.

== Operators ==
Poland

- Polish Air Force
  - 11th (Kościuszko) Squadron

Soviet Union

- Soviet Air Force – One aircraft, used for tests and trials.

Spain

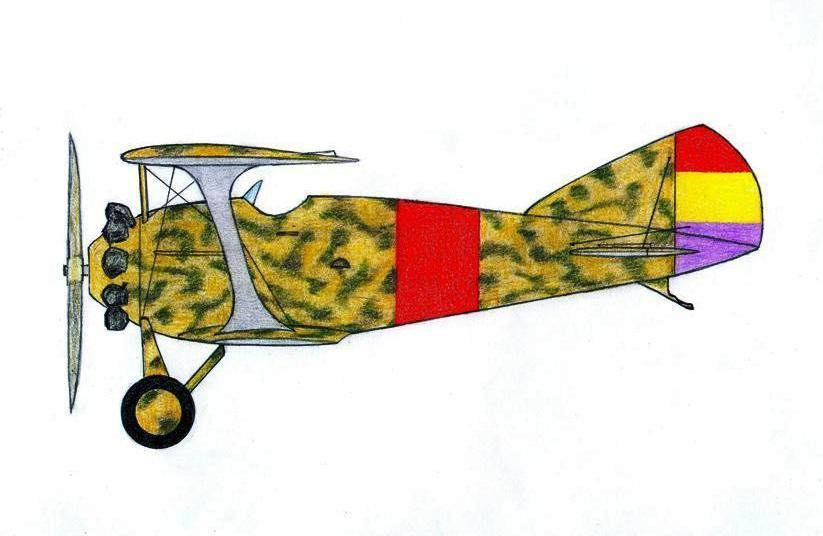
Spanish Blériot-SPAD S 51

- Spanish Republican Air Force

Turkey

- Turkish Air Force

== Specifications (S.51/2) ==
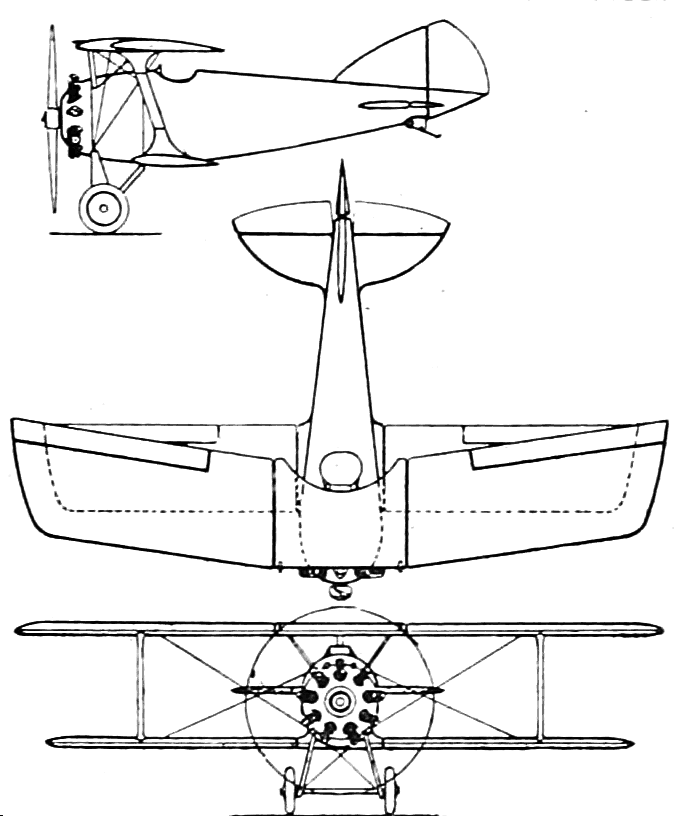
Bleriot-SPAD S.51 3-view Aero Digest August,1930

Data from Jane's all the World's Aircraft 1928, Aviafrance:S.51-2

General characteristics

- Crew: 1
- Length: 6.45 m (21 ft 2 in)
- Wingspan: 9.47 m (31 ft 1 in)
- Height: 3.1 m (10 ft 2 in)
- Wing area: 24.27 m^{2} (261.2 sq ft)
- Empty weight: 990 kg (2,183 lb)
- Gross weight: 1,360 kg (2,998 lb)
- Powerplant: 1 × Gnome & Rhône 9Ab Jupiter 9-cylinder air-cooled radial piston engine, 310 kW (420 hp)
- Propellers: 2-bladed fixed pitch propeller

Performance

- Maximum speed: 245 km/h (152 mph, 132 kn) at 100 m (330 ft)
- Rate of climb: 7.2 m/s (1,420 ft/min)
- Time to altitude: 4,000 m (13,000 ft) in 9 minutes
- Wing loading: 52.6 kg/m^{2} (10.8 lb/sq ft)
- Power/mass: 0.24537 kW/kg (0.14925 hp/lb)

Armament
2 × fixed, forward-firing 7.7 mm (0.303 in) Vickers machine-guns

== See also ==
Related lists

- List of aircraft of the Spanish Republican Air Force
- List of Interwar military aircraft

== Bibliography ==
- Bruner, Georges (1977). "Fighters a la Francaise, Part One". Air Enthusiast (3): 85–95. ISSN 0143-5450.
- Kotelnikov, V.; Kulikov, V. & Cony, C. (November 2001). "Les avions français en URSS, 1921–1941" [French Aircraft in the USSR, 1921–1941]. Avions: Toute l'Aéronautique et son histoire (in French) (104): 37–43. ISSN 1243-8650.
