= Romolo Ticconi =

Italian flying ace

- Born: 25 March 1893; Acuto, Kingdom of Italy
- Died: 26 August 1919 (aged 26); Montecelio, Kingdom of Italy
- Military career
- Allegiance: Italy
- Branch: Aviation
- Rank: Sergente
- Units: 76a Squadriglia, 81a Squadriglia
- Awards: Silver and Bronze Medal for Military Valor, Croce di Guerra

Sergente Romolo Ticconi was a World War I flying ace credited with six aerial victories.

== Biography ==
Romolo Ticconi was born in Acuto, the Kingdom of Italy, on 25 March 1893. Ticconi was conscripted into military service on 21 August 1914, before Italy had entered World War I. On 16 December 1916, he was promoted to Caporal. On 20 September 1917, he was reported at the Italian aviation replacement depot as a Sergeant Pilot.

On 27 January 1918, Ticconi joined a fighter squadron, 76a Squadriglia. He scored his first aerial victory on 3 May 1918, when he helped shoot down an enemy two-seater craft. On 24 May, he suffered an inflight fire in his cockpit that burned his right leg; it was one of three flying accidents he would survive during the war. On 25 June 1918, Ticconi and his squadronmates Giulio Lega and Silvio Scaroni vanquished two enemy fighters over Moreno di Piave for Ticconi's second and third victories.

On 7 July, Ticconi shared in one of Silvio Scaroni's victories, but was not credited with another other one. Also in July, he received the Silver Medal for Military Valor to add to his Croce di Guerra; by this time, he had flown 111 hours on 74 combat sorties for the squadron. Ticconi would strike twice more. On 14 August 1918, backed by Giorgio Michetti, he downed his fifth foe and became an ace. The next day, he shot down another enemy plane, for his final victory. Ticconi would fight through war's end, continuing to fly despite illness.

On 21 November 1918, in the wake of war's end, Ticconi transferred to 81a Squadriglia. His perseverance in flying while ill helped him win a belated award of the Bronze Medal for Military Valor. On 26 August 1919, Romolo Ticconi was killed in a flying accident at Montecelio.

== See also ==
- Medal of Military Valor
- Italian Air Force
