= Timeline of the 2011 Libyan civil war before military intervention =

Map of Libya
- The situation in Libya on 19 March 2011, just before the start of the international military intervention. • Cities controlled by pro-Gaddafi forces • Cities controlled by anti-Gaddafi forces • Ongoing fighting/unclear situation

The Libyan Civil War began on 15 February 2011 as a chain of civil protests and later evolved into a widespread uprising against the regime of Muammar Gaddafi. On 25 February, most of eastern Libya was reported to be under the control of protesters and rebel forces. Gaddafi remained in control of the cities of Tripoli, Sirte and Sabha. By 15 March, however, Gaddafi's forces had retaken more than half a dozen lost cities. Except for most of Cyrenaica and a few Tripolitania cities (such as Misrata) the majority of cities had returned to Gaddafi government control.

On 17 March, the United Nations Security Council passed a resolution which authorized member states "to take all necessary measures ... to protect civilians and civilian populated areas under threat of attack in the Libyan Arab Jamhariya, including Benghazi, while excluding an occupation force". This began a new phase in the conflict.

== Early phase (15–26 February) ==
=== 15 February ===
- In the evening approximately 200 people began demonstrating in front of the police headquarters in Benghazi following the arrest of human rights activist Fathi Terbil. They were later joined by others, totaling between 500 and 600 protesters. The protest was broken up violently by police, causing as many as forty injuries among the protesters.
- In Bayda and Zintan, hundreds of protesters called for "the end of the regime" and set fire to police and security buildings. In Zintan, the protesters set up tents in the town centre.

=== 16 February ===
- Protests continued in Benghazi, where hundreds of protesters gathered at Maydan al-Shajara before security services tried to disperse the crowd using water cannons. After clashes between the two groups, the police left. The protesters set fire to two cars and burnt down the headquarters of the traffic police. In the ensuing clashes with police six people died and three were injured. In Al-Quba, more than 400 protesters over a wide range of ages set fire to the police station. Protests were also reported in Derna and Zintan, though there were no injuries.
- Pro-government rallies of many dozens of Gaddafi supporters and Tripolitanian people also took place.
- Reportedly as a response to the demonstrations, Libya released 110 members of the Libyan Islamic Fighting Group from prison on 16 February.

=== 17 February: Day of Revolt ===
- Libyans called for a "Day of Revolt." The National Conference for the Libyan Opposition stated that "all" groups opposed to Gaddafi both within Libya and in exile planned the protests in memory of the demonstrations in Benghazi on 17 February 2006 that were initially against the Jyllands-Posten Muhammad cartoons, but which turned into protests against Gaddafi.
- In Benghazi, the government released thirty prisoners from jail, armed them and paid them to fight against protesters. Demonstrators claimed at the time that several people were killed by snipers and gunfire from helicopters. The Evening Standard and Al Jazeera estimated that fourteen people were killed. The latter reported that an eyewitness saw six unarmed protesters shot dead by police. The BBC News reported that "at least 15 people" were killed in the clashes.
- Libya al-Youm (يوم) reported that four people were shot dead by sniper fire in Bayda and a Libyan human-rights group reported thirteen people had been killed. In Ajdabiya and Derna at least ten and six protesters were killed by police, respectively. Protests also took place across Tripoli and in Zintan, where a number of government buildings including a police station were set on fire.

=== 18 February ===
- Thousands of anti-government protesters gathered in front of the Benghazi courthouse. According to the BBC News, a "doctor at Benghazi's Jalla hospital" told them that he had "seen 15 bodies – all dead from gunshot wounds" by the time he left the hospital "in the early hours of [the day]". Police and army personnel later withdrew from the city after being overwhelmed by protesters. Some army personnel also joined the protesters; they then seized the local radio station. In Bayda, unconfirmed reports indicated that the local police force and riot-control units joined the protesters. Two police officers who were accused of shooting protesters were hanged by protesters.
- According to a local activist, protesters in Bayda succeeded in capturing its military airbase, and then "executed 50 African mercenaries and two Libyan conspirators". He also claimed that other "conspirators were executed" in Derna by burning down a police station, where they were locked up in cells.
- The Libyan newspaper Quryna reported that about 1,000 non-political prisoners had escaped from a Benghazi prison. A security source told Agence France-Presse that four inmates were shot dead during a breakout attempt in Tripoli.
- The Libyan government initially restricted access to the Internet in Libya for several hours, but later imposed a more comprehensive and sustained blackout.

=== 19 February ===
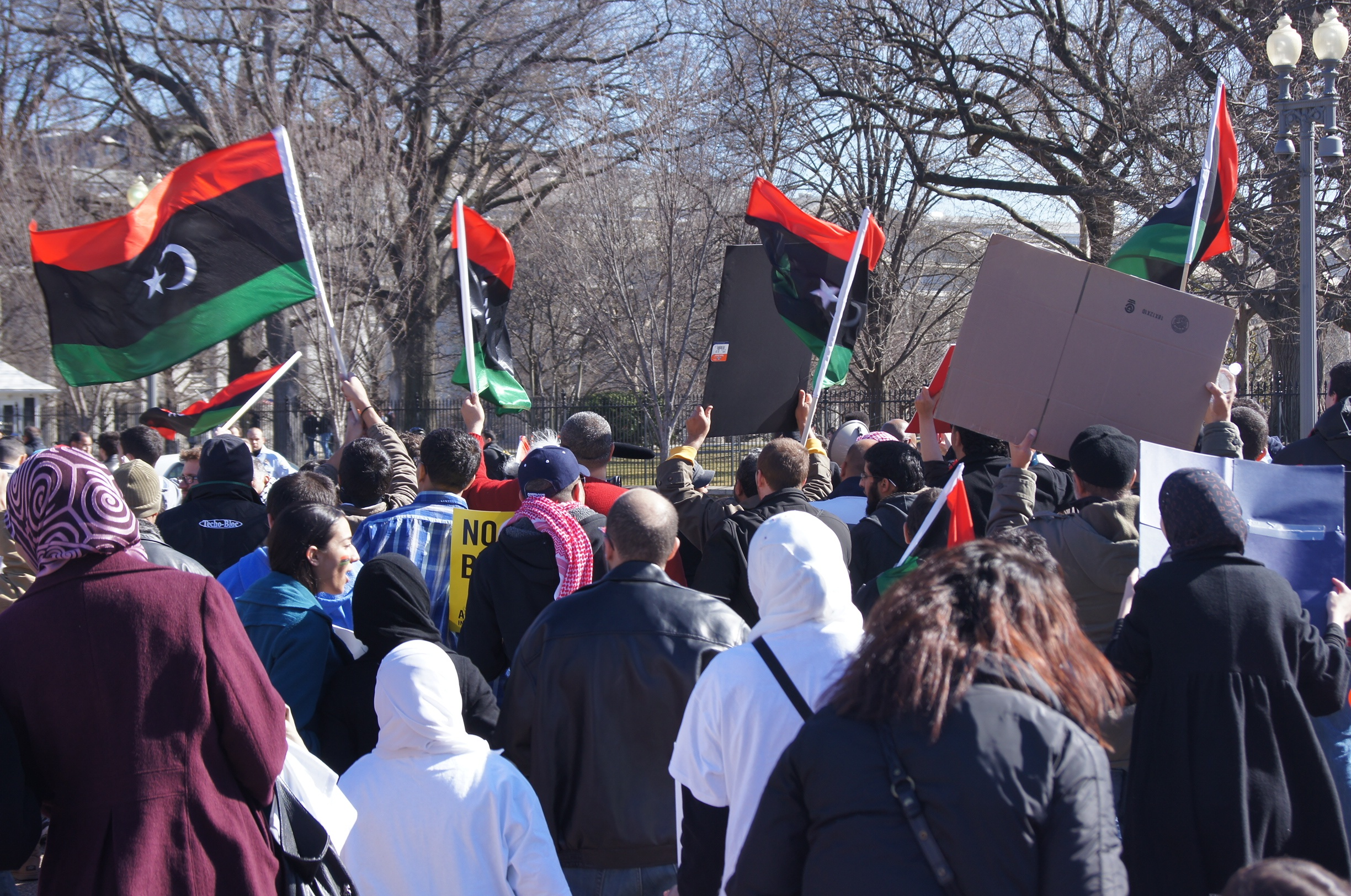
Opposition protests outside the White House, Washington, D.C., on 19 February

- Widespread protests continued for another day. Demonstrators in Benghazi had reportedly taken control of Benina International Airport early in the day.
- The opposition warned civilians of a massacre by the government, unless the international community applied pressure. Witnesses in Libya have reported helicopters firing into crowds of anti-government protesters. The army withdrew from the city of Bayda. Human Rights Watch and the Libyan newspaper Quryna said thousands of demonstrators had poured out onto the streets in Benghazi and other eastern cities on 18 February, a day after the clashes in which 49 people were killed, and that some protests were still continuing. Artillery, helicopter gunships and antiaircraft missile launchers were used to kill protesters. Security forces reportedly opened fire at a funeral for dead protesters in Benghazi, killing at least fifteen people and injuring scores more.
- A doctor from Benghazi's Al-Jalah Hospital said staff there had received fifteen bodies and were treating numerous people following the shootings at the funeral. "This is not a well-equipped hospital and these injuries come in waves," he said. "All are very serious injuries, involving the head, the chest and the abdomen. They are bullet injuries from high-velocity rifles." The hospital counted forty-four deaths in three days, and was struggling to treat the wounded. The residents of Benghazi told Al Jazeera that at least 200 people had died, while the Human Rights Watch put the countrywide death toll at a "conservative" 104 on 19 February.
- Anti-Gaddafi protests were also reported in Misrata, where thousands of people took part in peaceful protests. They were demonstrating against state brutality and censorship, rather than calling for a change in government.
- Both pro- and anti-government protests broke out in other major cities, including Bayda, Derna, Tobruk and Misrata.
- Several hundred government supporters and party activists took to the streets in large numbers, and security forces prevented large demonstrations against Gaddafi's government.
- According to figures compiled by Agence France-Presse from local sources, at least forty-one people had been killed since demonstrations first started on 15 February. The toll excludes two policemen, newspapers said, who had been hung in Bayda on 18 February. Human Rights Watch, citing phone interviews with hospital staff and eyewitnesses, said that security forces had killed more than eighty anti-Gaddafi protesters in eastern Libya. Opposition groups later put the number of dead at over 120. The residents of Benghazi told Al Jazeera that at least 200 people had died while Human Rights Watch put the countrywide death toll at a "conservative" 104. The security forces of Benghazi were in their barracks while the city was in a state of civil mutiny.
- Mohamed Abdulmalek, the chairman of the human rights group Libya Watch, commented that the delay of protests in the west was due to the heavy presence of Libya's State Security Forces and secret police were out there and "not because the people did not want to go out".
- Former UK Foreign Secretary and Chairman of the Commons Intelligence and Security Committee Sir Malcolm Rifkind told BBC News that the protests across the Middle East were resembling the anti-Communist/pro-democracy events in Eastern Europe of 1989. UK Foreign Secretary William Hague said he was "deeply concerned" by the "unacceptable violence" used against protesters.

=== 20 February ===
- Protests escalated with residents also reporting small protests beginning in Tripoli, indicating a widening of the unrest from the eastern half of Libya into Gaddafi's center of power. Hospitals confirmed that they had run out of supplies and doctors estimated the death toll in Benghazi to be between 200 and 300. After the people of Benghazi beat back the police and captured several key military barracks local military brigades joined the protesters. By this time, protesters in Benghazi numbered in the tens of thousands, possibly in the hundreds of thousands. Reports also emerged of pro-Gaddafi militia by the Elfedeel Bu Omar compound "being butchered by angry mobs." Al Jazeera said that protesters were in control of the city as government security forces fled to the airport. Further military units were reported to have defected in order to protect protesters. Several senior Muslim clerics and tribal leaders from around Libya called for an end to the bloodshed by the government, and for the government to step down. A "spontaneous" protest occurred in Tripoli by night where the protesters quickly overran police. One tribal leader threatened to block oil exports.
- The Tuareg tribe in the south was said to have answered a call by the larger Warfalla tribe to take part in the protests. The Tuareg towns of Ghat and Ubari were also locations for violence, with members of the tribe reportedly attacking government buildings and police stations.
- Gaddafi's second son Saif al-Islam appeared on state television and said that the unrest "may cause civil war". He also said that Libya was different from its neighbours. He ended by warning, "We will fight to the last man and woman and bullet. We will not lose Libya. We will not let Al Jazeera, Al Arabiya and BBC trick us". State-run Al-Shababiya was reportedly attacked in the evening following Saif al Islam's address.
- The United States Department of State, through the American Embassy, issued a travel warning to US citizens due to the continuing unrest in Libya. The European Union called on the government to refrain from using force and to answer the protesters' grievances.
- In the night, clashes escalated in Tripoli, with protesters trying to seize control of Green Square. Witnesses reported snipers firing into the crowds, and Gaddafi supporters driving around the square shooting and running demonstrators over. Protesters burned a police and security forces' station and the General People's Congress' building. Hospital mortuaries in Tripoli were reportedly overrun with bodies many having gunshot wounds to the head and chest. It is estimated that 600 to 700 people were killed.

=== 21 February ===
- Gaddafi's son Saif al-Islam Gaddafi called for a "general assembly" to discuss grievances.

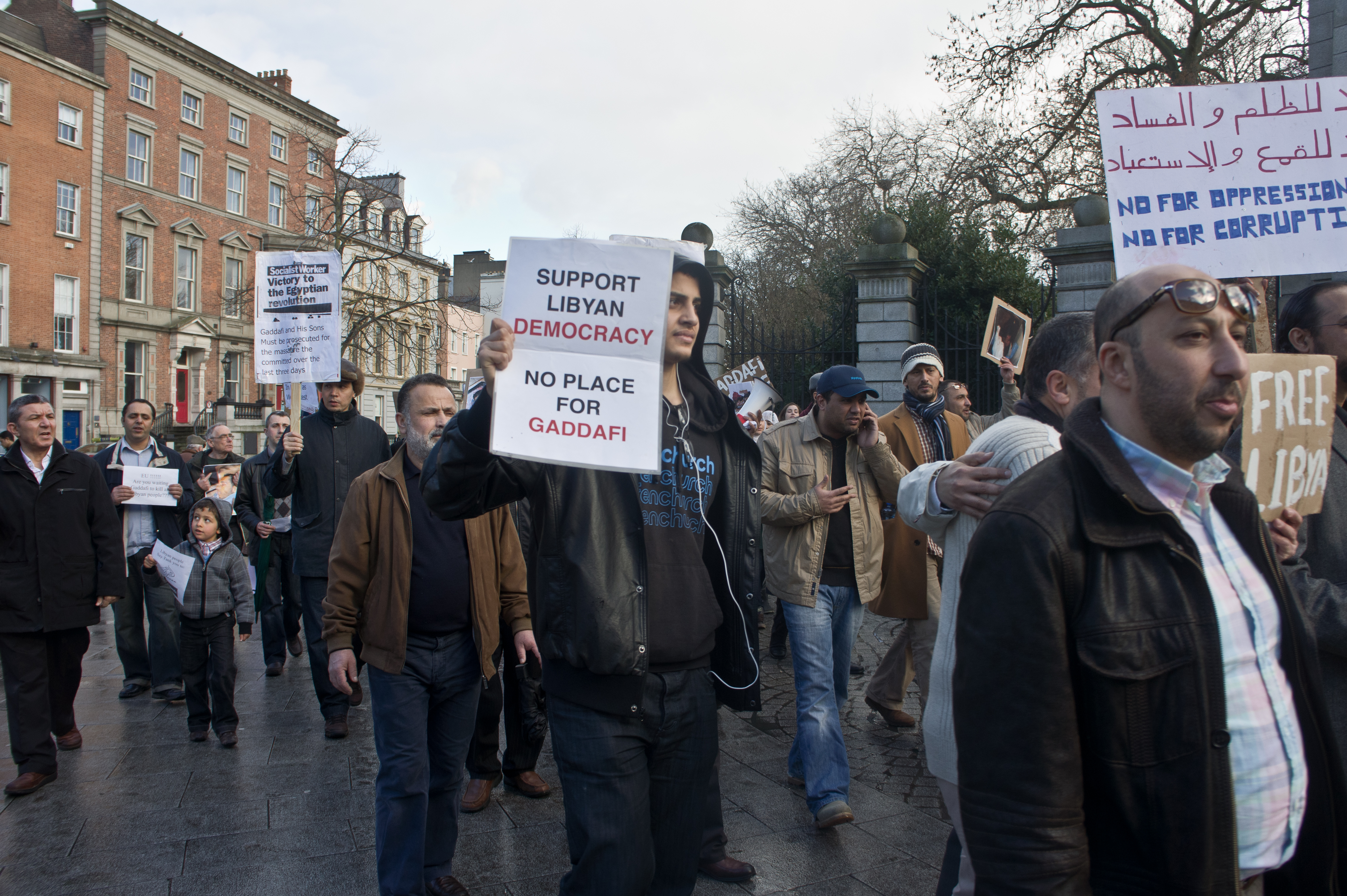
Representatives of the Libyan Community in Ireland demonstrating in Dublin, Ireland, against Gaddafi on 21 February 2011.

- In Benghazi, protesters took control of the streets, looted weapons from the main security headquarters and seized the local radio station, starting their own broadcasts under the name Voice of Free Libya. Demonstrators also lowered the Libyan flag from above the main courthouse and replaced it with the flag of Libya's old monarchy. Libyan Air Force warplanes and attack helicopters launched airstrikes on protesters, reportedly targeting a funeral procession and a group of protesters trying to reach a military base. Two senior mutineering air force pilots flew their Dassault Mirage F1 fighter jets to Malta and requested political asylum after defying orders to bomb protesters. Two civilian helicopters also landed in Malta, carrying seven passengers who claimed to be French oil workers.
- Reports indicated the People's Hall in Tripoli, which serves as the meeting place for the General People's Congress, had been set on fire. There were also reports that the state-television building had been smashed up by protesters and that at least one Tripoli police station was burned down. Libyan Navy warships were reported to have begun bombardment of residential areas causing an unknown number of casualties. Banks and other government buildings were looted throughout the day. Demonstrators clashed with security forces, and heavy gunfire was heard throughout the city. At least sixty-one people were killed.
- Some people alleged that they were offered money to turn up for pro-Gaddafi rallies outside Libya. Within Libya, state-run television showed pro-Gaddafi rallies, though the international media doubted the authenticity of these protests as possibly having been staged.
- The Libyan Navy reportedly shelled demonstrators from the sea, and Gaddafi allegedly issued execution orders to soldiers refusing to fire on protesters.
- UK Foreign Secretary Hague said that he had received information that Gaddafi had left Libya and was travelling to Venezuela. Venezuelan government officials denied reports that Gaddafi had left Libya and was on a plane bound for Caracas. It was later reported that one of Gaddafi's sons arrived on Isla Margarita, Venezuela, around the time that Hague made his allegation.
- The BBC News reported that the Libyan Army was "fighting forces loyal to Colonel Gaddafi, who appears to be struggling to hold on to power." A group of army officers also called upon their fellow soldiers to "join the people" and remove Gaddafi from office. Islamic leaders and clerics in Libya urged all Muslims to rebel against Gaddafi. The Libyan Ambassador to Poland stated that the flood of defections by elements of the Army and Air Force, as well as by government ministers, could not be stopped and that Gaddafi's days in power were numbered. He also said that firing on the protesters was only increasing the unrest and that it was the sign of a dying government. The Libyan Ambassadors to Indonesia, Bangladesh, the European Union and India also resigned in protest of the actions of the Gaddafi government.
- Protesters seized control of the oil town of Ra's Lanuf and workers set up committees to protect the oil installations.
- Activists claimed that protesters surrounded Gaddafi's Bab al-Aziza compound and were trying to storm it, but were forced back by heavy gunfire that killed up to 80 people.

=== 22 February ===
- Gaddafi made a brief appearance on Libyan state television in which he said he had been speaking to the youth in Tripoli's Green Square. He also said:

I am in Tripoli. Do not believe the (news) channels belonging to stray dogs.

Gunfire was reportedly heard throughout the night of 21–22 February. Government soldiers were reported to have continued some bombarding to keep defecting soldiers away from the protests. Fighter jets were reported to have targeted army ammunition depots in order to prevent troops from joining the protesters.

- A Libyan naval vessel was reportedly sighted off the coast of Malta. According to Al Jazeera, five Italian fighter jets overflew the ship, and the Italian Navy began conducting surveillance. The ship reportedly had its flag lowered, suggesting that the crew may want to defect. The Armed Forces of Malta several times denied reports in the international media that it was monitoring any such vessels approaching Maltese shores.
- Former Libyan Ambassador to India Ali Abd-al-Aziz al-Isawi, stated that he feared returning to Libya. He also confirmed that fighter jets were used to bomb civilians, and that foreign mercenaries, who seemed to have come from other African states, were "massacring" people.
- Former Libyan Ambassador to Bangladesh A. H. Elimam, was also reported to have "disappeared" after 9:00 Bangladesh time. Al Jazeera said the last conversation with him noted "a sense of panic" in his voice and that his phone had been switched off. He indicated a feeling of being threatened by an intelligence officer at the embassy, who was from the same village as Gaddafi. The Bangladeshi Foreign Ministry and other diplomats in that state could not confirm his whereabouts.
- A doctor in Tripoli told Asharq Al-Awsat that mercenaries broke into his hospital and killed injured people.
- Former UK Foreign Secretary David Owen said that a "military intervention" via a no-fly zone was immediately necessary. The Austrian Army reported that the airspace around Tripoli had been closed, but later retracted the statement. An Austrian Defense Ministry spokesman, Michael Huber, said: "One of our sources said that initially that it (airspace) was closed, but then another later confirmed otherwise. Our plane was able to leave."
- Eyewitnesses reported that thousands of African mercenaries were flown into Tripoli to put down the uprising. One insider source reportedly said that Gaddafi now could only rely on his own clan and 5,000 men, out of 45,000, and knew he could not retake Libya. According to this source, he apparently planned to force a Pyrrhic victory on his opponents; to whittle down their numbers with many skirmishes, harm the economy by sabotaging oil reserves, and in every sense damaging infrastructure to the best of his ability, stating "I have the money and arms to fight for a long time". Oil infrastructures may be sabotaged to cut economic supply to rebel clans, while fights may lead thousands to flee Libya to pressure them. Thus, all may prefer to accept the Gaddafi's status quo.
- In a second speech within twenty-four hours, believed by commentators to be made from his family compound in the Bab al-Azizia military barracks in southern Tripoli, Gaddafi blamed foreign powers and hallucinogens being forced on the protesters for the unrest. He rejected stepping down, saying he had no official position from which he could step down, and stated that he would "die as martyr". The scenery of the speech indicated that Gaddafi was in Libya.
- In his hour-long speech, he blamed the uprising on "Islamists", and then warned that an "Islamic emirate" has already been set up in Bayda and Derna, where he threatened the use of extreme force to stop the Islamfication of Libya. Gaddafi vowed to fight on and die a "martyr" on Libyan soil. He then called on his supporters to take back the streets on the 23rd from protesters and tribal rebels, who were demanding that he step down. He also went on to state that he had "not yet ordered the use of force", and warned viewers that "when I do, everything will burn".
- Gaddafi vowed to fight his opponents "until the last drop of his blood had been spilt" rather than step down, describing anti-government protesters as "rats" and "mercenaries" working for foreign states and corporate agendas. Gaddafi said the rioting urban youths that were opposed to his rule were manipulated by others who gave them drugs and who were trying to turn Libya into an Islamic state. (In earlier speeches he blamed "Zionists" for the riots.) Furthermore, he threatened a Tiananmen-style crackdown. The speech would later be parodied in a viral YouTube video entitled Zenga Zenga.
- Abdul Fatah Younis, who held the position of top general and interior minister, escaped from house arrest, resigned, and called for the army and police to fight Gaddafi and his government. Until his resignation, General Younis was regarded as the second most powerful man in Libya.
- Human Rights Watch said that at least 233 people had been killed up to 22 February.
- By nighttime, the Arab League had suspended the Libyan delegation from meetings until the Libyan people were safe.

=== 23 February ===
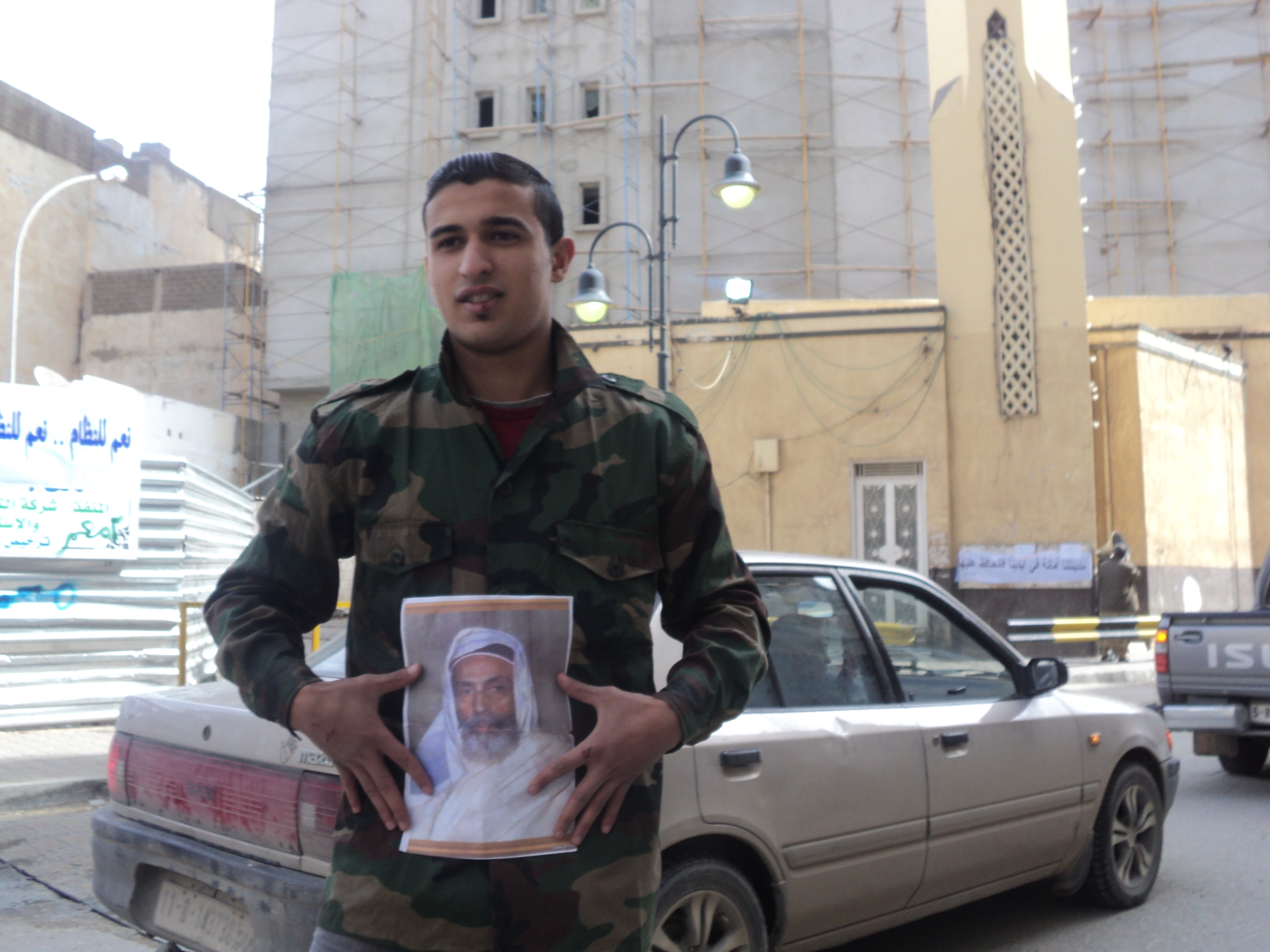
A young Libyan carrying King Idris's photograph during a protest in Benghazi on 23 February 2011.

- UK Foreign Secretary Hague said in a press release that there were "many indications of the structure of the State collapsing in Libya". He also urged the Libyan state to listen to people's demands. Luxembourger Foreign Minister Jean Asselborn called the situation in Libya a genocide and called for massive intervention from the international community. He argued a resolution was needed allowing control of Libyan airspace so as to stop mercenaries entering Libya. He called Gaddafi a "sick and dangerous" "tyrant".
- Peru fully severed diplomatic ties with Libya's government and the African Union conducted a security meeting on the rapidly changing situation in Libya. The European Union agreed in principle to impose sanctions, the form of which to be decided the following Friday, and the Dutch government met in emergency session to consider freezing billions of euros of assets invested by Tamoil, the Libyan government's oil company.
- The Warfalla, the largest of the numerous tribes in Libya, joined calls from other tribes for Gaddafi to stand down.
- Mustafa Abdul Jalil, Libya's justice minister, who had resigned on 21 February in protest at the "excessive use of violence" against protesters along with diplomats at the Libyan Mission to the United Nations, who called on the Libyan Army to help remove "the tyrant Muammar Gaddafi". He had also asserted that Gaddafi personally ordered the Lockerbie bombing of 1988.
- Youssef Sawani, a senior aide to Gaddafi's son Saif al-Islam Gaddafi, resigned from his post "to express dismay against violence" and thousands of foreigners continue to leave, with chaos at Tripoli International Airport.
- Tripoli's streets were deserted after Gaddafi urged attacks on protesters, but Tobruk was still full of protesters. Italian Foreign Minister Franco Frattini said there were credible reports that about 1,000 people have been killed in Libya's week-old rebellion. Frattini also confirmed that the eastern half of Libya, known as Cyrenaica, was no longer under Gaddafi's de facto control. Unconfirmed reports suggested that the government now only controlled a few parts of Tripoli and the southern desert town of Sabha. Misrata was confirmed to be under protester control. The pre-Gaddafi 1951–1969 royalist Libyan flag was also reportedly raised in Zawiya, 50 km (31 mi) west of Tripoli. Both coastal Tripolitania and most of northern Cyrenaica were in rebel hands by the middle of the day. The Paris-based International Federation for Human Rights said that the anti-Gaddafi protesters also controlled Sirte, Misrata, Khoms, the Tarhunah District, Zintan, Zawiya and Zuwara. Pro-Gaddafi forces were sent to Sabratha after demonstrators burned government buildings and joined in the rebellion, according to Libyan newspaper Quryna.
- A 23 February Reuters article stated that according to a WikiLeaks-leaked US cable, Gaddafi pressed the US to foster division and disagreements in Saudi Arabia and exerted heavy pressure on the US as well as on oil companies to reimburse the $1.5 billion Libya had paid in 2008 into a fund to settle terrorism claims from the 1980s.
- By the end of the day, headlines in online news services were reporting a range of themes underlining the precarious state of the regime – former justice minister Mustafa Abdul Jalil alleged that Gaddafi personally ordered the 1988 Lockerbie bombing, resignations and "defections" of close allies, the loss of Benghazi, the second-largest city in Libya, reported to be "alive with celebration" and other cities including Tobruk and Misrata reportedly falling with some believing that government had retained control of "just a few pockets", Gaddafi family members allegedly refused entry to safe jurisdictions (an unscheduled plane said to be carrying Gaddafi's daughter Aisha was denied permission to enter Malta, although the Maltese government later denied knowing whether she was on board), mounting international isolation and pressure, and reports that Middle East media considered the end of his "disintegrating" regime all but inevitable.
- Around midnight, some reports began to emerge describing the situation as civil war or revolution, with Gaddafi trying to ensure control over the capital and his political base Tripoli.

=== 24 February ===
- Protesters assumed complete control of Tobruk, where soldiers and residents celebrated by waving the former Libyan flag used during the Kingdom of Libya (1951–1969), firing guns into the air and honking horns. Army units in Tobruk and throughout eastern Libya sided with protesters, with some soldiers and officers participating in demonstrations. Commanders pledged to defend the "liberated territory" with their lives after Gaddafi threatened to take it back by force. Two airmen bailed out of their jet, which crashed into the desert, after defying orders to bomb Tobruk. In the collapse of central authority, residents formed public-defence committees for security, and opened welfare organisations to ensure that residents had enough to eat. At newly established security checkpoints, demonstrators handed out bottled water and juice to passing motorists.
- Cities and towns close to Tripoli were reported to be falling to protesters, while in Tripoli itself, pro-Gaddafi militia patrolled the streets to prevent demonstrations. In the east, civilian protesters and military units that had defected and reorganized armed themselves to prepare for an upcoming "Battle of Tripoli". Meanwhile, Gaddafi prepared for the defense of the city by gathering pro-government forces in the capital and deploying tanks in the suburbs.
- The North African wing of al-Qaeda announced that they would support the Libyan uprising. In a televised phone call to the people of Zawiya, where fighting was taking place, Gaddafi claimed the revolts could be blamed on Osama bin Laden, and that young Libyans had been duped with drugs and alcohol. Gaddafi dispatched an envoy to Zawiya, who warned protesters of a "massacre" if they did not leave.
- Pro-Gaddafi Libyan forces and foreign mercenaries opened fire on a mosque in Zawiya, where residents, some armed with hunting rifles, had been holding a sit-in to support the protesters in Tripoli. The troops blasted the mosque's minaret with an anti-aircraft gun, killing 10 people and wounding 150. Thousands of people then gathered in Zawiya's main square to demonstrate against Gaddafi. Hours after the attack, Gaddafi gave a speech on state television, where he expressed condolences for the deaths, but scolded the city's residents for siding with the uprising, saying "shame on you, people of Zawiya, control your children", and that "they are loyal to Bin Laden. What do you have to do with Bin Laden, people of Zawiya? They are exploiting young people... I insist it is Bin Laden". He also blamed teenagers on hallucinogenic pills given to them "in their coffee with milk, like Nescafé".
- Pro-Gaddafi militia and foreign mercenaries also attacked an airport outside Misrata, which was defended by protesters armed with rifles, in what would become the Battle of Misrata. During the fighting, the militia bombarded the protesters with rocket-propelled grenades and mortars, while the protesters managed to seize an anti-aircraft gun and turn it against the militia. At the same time, officers from an air-force school near the airport mutinied, and with the help of local residents, overran an adjacent airbase where Gaddafi supporters were holed up, and disabled fighter jets to prevent their use against protesters. Five people were killed during the fighting: four protesters and one pro-Gaddafi militiaman, and another forty wounded.
- In Tripoli, militia and foreign mercenaries continued patrolling the streets, firing guns into the air, while neighbourhood-watch groups barricaded side streets to try to keep the fighters out. Security forces also raided numerous homes around the city and arrested suspected political opponents. Armed militiamen entered a hospital to search for government opponents among the wounded.
- Ahmed Gaddaf al-Dam, a cousin and one of Gaddafi's closest aides, defected to Egypt, protesting what he called "grave violations of human rights and human and international laws.
- The European Union called for Libya to be suspended from the United Nations Human Rights Council, and for the United Nations Security Council to approve a probe to investigate "gross and systematic violations of human rights by the Libyan authorities", while Switzerland froze all of Gaddafi's assets there. Sources in the UK government including the UK Treasury, announced that Gaddafi's assets were being tracked and that £20 billion in liquid assets and a £10-million mansion in London would be seized within days.

=== 25 February ===
- For the first time in days, thousands took to the streets of Tripoli to protest, with protester and civilian death tolls rising.
- The dual military and civilian Mitiga International Airport, about 11 kilometres (6.8 mi) east of Tripoli, seemed to have been taken over by anti-Gaddafi protesters in the afternoon, "after a series of defections". The Guardian described the takeover as "confirmed"; Guardian journalist Ian Black, stated, "If Mitiga air base near Tripoli is confirmed as having gone over to the Libyan popular uprising it would be a serious blow for the regime close to the heart of the capital."
- Gaddafi in Tripoli's Green Square, with a crowd of supporters, "Sing, dance and be ready, we will fight those who are against us" and "If the people of Libya and the Arabs and Africans don't love Muammar Gaddafi then Muammar Gaddafi does not deserve to live."

=== 26 February ===
- United Nations Security Council Resolution 1970 was passed unanimously, referring the Libyan government to the International Criminal Court.
- Witnesses told Al Jazeera Arabic that Libyan protesters had taken control of a number of areas in Tripoli. Security forces had abandoned the working-class Tajoura district, after five days of anti-government demonstrations, residents told foreign correspondents who visited the area.
- In Benghazi, a small naval base became controlled by the opposition. The naval force consisted of a missile cruiser, a frigate, a decommissioned minesweeper and a decommissioned submarine. The commander of the fleet that remained, after his superiors deserted their posts, said that he would defend the city against Gaddafi forces, saying that "He [Gaddafi] means nothing to me, he sees the east part of the country as enemies and he will do anything to exterminate us".
- In Benghazi, a spokesman for the revolution told Agence France-Presse that they were drawing up plans for a transitional government to take power, but in the nearby town of Ajdabiya, local residents said food was becoming scarce.
- By the end of the day, an interim government had been formed by former justice minister Mustafa Abdul Jalil. Libyan Ambassador to the US Ali Suleiman Aujali became the first Libyan diplomat to recognise the new government.
- For the first time, US President Barack Obama urged Gaddafi to step down from power and avoid further violence. US Secretary of State Hillary Clinton took the same stance.

== National Transitional Council established (27 February – 3 March) ==
=== 27 February ===
- After distancing itself from the Gaddafi government, the Italian government officially suspended the "friendship" treaty it holds with Libya. The treaty forbids warfare or military confrontation between the two states, but the suspension of the treaty would allow otherwise.
- On 27 February, the Tripoli Post reported that the UN Security Council on 26 February had voted unanimously to impose sanctions against the Libyan authorities, imposing an arms embargo and freezing the assets of its leaders, while referring the ongoing violent repression of civilian demonstrators to the International Criminal Court.
- Gaddafi gave an interview to Serbian television station RTV Pink, calling the UN Security Council resolution "invalid in accordance with the United Nations Charter" and that the resolution was based on the news reports rather than on actual state in Libya. He vowed to stay in Libya blaming the "foreigners and Al-Qaeda" for the unrest, saying that the protests began when "the gangs of drugged young men attacked regular army forces".
- A National Transitional Council was formed in Benghazi. It was created not as a provisional government but rather seeking to act as the "political face of the uprising". The efforts of former justice minister Mustafa Abdul Jalil to form a provisional government appeared to have stalled.
- Tripoli was largely quiet during the morning, with militiamen erecting additional roadblocks and tanks parked at major intersections. Residents said the Libyan leader was arming civilian supporters to set up checkpoints and roving patrols around the capital to control movement and quash dissent.
- Zawiya, a city of 290,000 just 50 km (31 mi) west of Tripoli, appeared to be a potential focal point for clashes as anti-government forces mounted tanks and anti-aircraft guns throughout the city center, and Gaddafi forces surrounded the outskirts with tanks and military checkpoints, according to an Associated Press reporter who visited the city.
- The UK revoked the diplomatic immunity of Gaddafi and his family, UK Foreign Secretary Hague said, urging the dictator to step down. The Belgian government announced that it would shut down its embassy in Tripoli on 28 February, temporarily discontinuing diplomatic activities in the troubled north African state, the foreign ministry said. Canada, France, the UK and the US were among the states that had already temporarily shut their embassies in Tripoli and evacuated their staff amid growing unrest over demands for Gaddafi to quit.
- US Secretary of State Clinton offered "any kind of assistance" to Libyans and opposition groups seeking to overthrow Gaddafi.
- Hafiz Ghoga, spokesman for the National Transitional Council, said the council was not an interim government, was not contacting foreign governments and did not want them to intervene. "We will help liberate other Libyan cities, in particular Tripoli through our national army, our armed forces, of which part have announced their support for the people," Ghoga said, but he did not give details about how the council would help. Although not a direct response to Clinton's remarks, Ghoga said: "We are completely against foreign intervention. The rest of Libya will be liberated by the people and Gaddafi's security forces will be eliminated by the people of Libya."

=== 28 February ===
- It was reported that opposition forces shot down a government warplane during the Battle of Misrata.
- The US Navy began positioning several ships near the coast of Libya, although it was still unclear what action they might take. Calls for a military enforced no-fly-zone on Libya became increasingly prominent. UK Prime Minister David Cameron, proposed the idea of a no-fly zone to prevent Gaddafi from airlifting mercenaries and using his military aeroplanes and armoured helicopters against civilians. Rhetoric used by US Secretary of State Hillary Clinton suggested that the implication of such was likely. Clinton also stepped up her rhetoric against Gaddafi, calling for his immediate removal.
- Gaddafi had reportedly appointed the head of Libya's foreign intelligence service to speak to the leadership of the anti-government protesters in the east of Libya.
- The US froze US$30 billion of assets belonging to the Libyan government, the largest amount of assets ever frozen.
- Pro-Gaddafi forces tried to retake control of the western border crossings with Tunisia that had fallen under opposition control and they bombed an ammunition depot in the rebel-held east, residents in the area said. The Libyan Defense Ministry denied the bombing.
- Government forces attacked Zawiya and Misrata, but were repelled by anti-government forces with a small number of casualties on both sides.

=== 1 March ===
- On 1 March, Australian Minister for Defence Stephen Smith confirmed that his government was considering military options against Gaddafi, saying that international intervention to enforce a no-fly zone was probable. Smith asserted that "no one is expecting" Gaddafi to leave power voluntarily. Al Jazeera reported that Misrata was once again under attack, this time from a combined armor and air assault. According to a witness quoted by Al Jazeera, Gaddafi's forces were using heavy weapons against protesters and rebels in the city, while the anti-Gaddafi forces were fighting back with small arms.
- Abdul Fatah Younis, Gaddafi's former interior minister and the leader of a growing rebel force, told Al Jazeera that if Gaddafi could not be dislodged from Tripoli, he would welcome foreign intervention in the form of targeted airstrikes, though he said a land invasion was unwanted and offered the use of Libyan military airbases only in case of emergency to foreign aircraft. Al Jazeera also reported that anti-Gaddafi forces had repulsed a six-hour offensive by government forces attempting to seize Zawiya, securing the city for the opposition.
- Rebel leaders debated whether to ask for Western airstrikes under the United Nations banner against military assets of the government. One senior official said, "If he falls with no intervention, I'd be happy, but if he's going to commit a massacre, my priority is to save my people."
- Brigadier Musa'ed Ghaidan Al Mansouri, the head of the Al Wahat Security Directorate, and Brigadier Hassan Ibrahim Al Qarawi defected to the protester side.
- Brigadier Dawood Issa Al Qafsi later defected to the opposition as well. The brigadier also confirmed that the eastern towns of Brega, Bishr, El Agheila, Sultan and Zuwetina are under opposition control as well.
- By night, the UN had suspended Libya from the UN Human Rights Council.
- Britain's foreign secretary William Hague said that a no-fly zone could be imposed "even without a Security Council resolution – it depends on the situation on the ground".
- Gaddafi's government sought to show that it was the state's only legitimate authority and that it continued to feel compassion for areas in the east that fell under the control of its opponents. A total of eighteen trucks loaded with rice, flour, sugar and eggs left Tripoli for Benghazi. Also in the convoy were two refrigerated cars carrying medical supplies.
- Gaddafi's government attempted to retake Gharyan and Zliten. The governments's forces were repelled from Zliten, but remained local at Gharyan, where there was ongoing fighting.

=== 2 March ===
- The Gaddafi government attempted to retake the city of Brega, but the attack was largely repelled by the rebels. At least fourteen were reported killed in the fighting, although reporters who came in from the Benghazi area saw only four dead, two of which were apparently pro-Gaddafi fighters. The attack on Brega was believed to be more towards psychological warfare against the eastern cities.
- Warplanes were also sent to Ajdabiya in an attempt to bomb the weapons storage. Two fighter jets attacked the weapons storage area, one of which was shot down by anti-aircraft guns.
- Benghazian residents stated that a convoy of armed opposition fighters, accompanied by army officers, had embarked on a long journey south. They were expected to attempt to reach Tripoli by navigating around the town of Sirte.
- The opposition's interim-government council had formally requested the UN to impose a no-fly zone and to conduct precision air strikes against Gaddafi's forces. US Secretary of State Clinton, after backing down from the idea of a no-fly zone, re-engaged in supporting the idea of a military enforced no-fly zone. The Arab League stated that a no-fly zone was necessary. It also said that in cooperation with the African Union, it could impose a military-enforced no-fly zone without the UN's backing.
- By the end of the day, rebels in the southwest city of Ghadames managed to take control of the city.

=== 3 March ===
- The International Criminal Court announced it would begin to launch an investigation into war crimes committed by Gaddafi, his sons and his inner circle. Opposition forces were also to be investigated as well to assure no crimes were being committed on its side.
- The Libyan opposition rejected calls from Venezuelan President Hugo Chávez to conduct peaceful dialogue with Gaddafi, after Chávez convinced Gaddafi to start "peaceful talks with protesters". The Libyan opposition refused to conduct talks or negotiations with the government.

== Initial rebel advance (4–5 March) ==
=== 4 March ===
- Occasional air strikes continued on Ajdabiya's weapon-storage area, with no reported casualties.
- Government forces in Tripoli prepared for an expected mass protest by anti-government activists after Friday prayers. By the afternoon, demonstrators gathered in the thousands, but did not amount to a siege of the city.
- Government forces attempted to retake the oil refineries in Zawiya, but were met with heavy resistance, with casualties on both sides according to witnesses. During the night, pro-Gaddafi forces withdrew to the outside of the city, according to local witnesses.
- According to eye-witness accounts, opposition forces had begun an assault on the small port town of Ra's Lanuf. The opposition forces claimed that they numbered 7,000 personnel in the attack on Ra's Lanuf. They also reported that there were "massive" defections at the local pro-Gaddafi military base in Ra's Lanuf.
- By night, the opposition forces managed to capture the entire town of Ra's Lanuf, including the airbase.

=== 5 March ===
- In battles occurring in the morning of 5 March in Zawiya, thirty-three people were reported killed, twenty-five of them rebels and eight pro-Gaddafi soldiers. Pro-Gaddafi forces used tanks to destroy residential buildings and kill some protesters, but rebels were able to overcome them by capturing some and lighting another six tanks on fire. By mid-day, pro-Gaddafi soldiers were reported to have been beaten back.
- Witnesses reported that a fighter jet was shot down in Ra's Lanuf after it attempted to bomb the town. They later report that they had found the remains of two pilots. This incident is confirmed through video evidence.
- Rebels prepared to try to capture the city of Sirte, Gaddafi's home town and stronghold. Rebels took control of Bin Jawad, a town between Ra's Lanuf and Sirte. Political divides and hostilities had already formed amongst the local population in Sirte because of the killing of several tribesmen by government forces.
- After previously backing down from the idea, France re-engaged in support for a no- fly zone and was working with the US and UK to get the resolution passed.
- The National Council established by the opposition declared itself Libya's sole representative.

== First loyalist offensive (6–16 March) ==
=== 6 March ===
- Opposition forces advancing on Sirte were targeted by Libyan warplanes in the morning, although the effectiveness of the airstrikes was unclear, and a witness fighting for the opposition reported heavy fighting in Bin Jawad as Government soldiers apparently launched a counterattack against the town. Al Jazeera reported that opposition forces were massing for a decisive battle at the town of Wadi al Ahmar, which could determine control of Sirte itself.
- At least some advancing rebels withdrew toward Ra's Lanuf under helicopter attack, Al Jazeera and Reuters reported, and Libyan warplanes again bombed positions near both Ra's Lanuf and Zawiya. Administration of Bin Jawad was resumed by government forces as the rebels retreated, but Al Jazeera reported opposition forces pushed west after reportedly shooting down an attack helicopter and two warplanes and reasserted control over the hamlet. Al Arabiya and other agencies reported that forces loyal to Gaddafi began shelling the city of Misrata, the largest opposition stronghold in Tripolitania.
- According to local witnesses, the rebels fended off the attack on Misrata by Gaddafi's forces. 21 rebels and civilians were killed, including a twelve-year-old boy. 22 of Gaddafi's soldiers were killed, and another twenty captured.

=== 7 March ===
- France and the UK were attempting to get a no-fly zone established through the UN Security Council, after previously backing down from the idea. The gulf states in the Middle East had officially called for a no-fly zone to be placed, and an Arab League emergency meeting will discuss the implication of one backed by its own organization.
- Hundreds of Gaddafi's soldiers entered Zawiya with tanks. According to local witnesses, the soldiers used the tanks to fire at houses and many homes were destroyed. The death toll was a minimum of eight, with dozens of civilians casualties expected to be found. Rebels still controlled Zawiya, however, but was fighting the fiercest battle yet, according to witnesses. Some witnesses went on to say "the whole town is in ruins".
- By the morning of 7 March, BBC News had reported that the town of Bin Jawad was under the control of government forces and they were advancing on Ra's Lanuf.
- While rebels in Ra's Lanuf managed to successfully fend off attacking infantry forces, fighter jets continued to launch air-strikes in Ra's Lanuf, causing several casualties.

=== 8 March ===
- Air strikes continued on Ra's Lanuf, which was still held by rebels. The air strikes on 8 March caused no casualties. Zawiya was still held by rebels, but under repeated artillery fire by pro-Gaddafi forces. A video posted on YouTube, allegedly provided by Sky News reporters who sneaked into Zawiya, debunked the government's claims that they controlled the city.
- The National Transitional Council issued a statement to Gaddafi, saying that if he and his family were to call off fighting and leave Libya within seventy-two hours, the council would not prosecute them for crimes committed.

=== 9 March ===
- Rebels still held on to Zawiya but were still under assault by tanks, snipers, and heavy artillery from Gaddafi's forces. Local witnesses said the government's military temporarily captured Zawiya's main square, but by night were driven back to 1 kilometre (0.62 mi) from the city center.
- The rebels attempted to move against Bin Jawad once more; however, after firing off around fifty rockets and making some advances, they were hit by artillery and air strikes and retreated to Ra's Lanuf. The rebels then claimed that they had eventually retaken Bin Jawad, although this could not be confirmed.
- The European Parliament urged all European states to recognize the National Interim Council as the government of Libya.

=== 10 March ===
- On 10 March, France officially recognized the National Transitional Council as Libya's only legitimate government. Portugal later also recognized the council.
- Zawiya was retaken by government forces. Reporters from The Times and ITV reported from the square in the city where they confirmed it was under government control and clean-up operations were underway. At the same time on the eastern front, after beating back the rebels from Bin Jawad, government forces launched their largest attack yet against Ra's Lanuf and began to move into the town. Opposition forces were in retreat from the city along with some of the civilian population and were attempting to regroup east of Ra's Lanuf.
- In spite of Libyan state television claiming that Gaddafi forces had cleared Ras Lanuf of "armed gangs" and Government military forces intensifying their attack "with heavy artillery from the sea and the air", anti-Gaddafi forces still controlled the town.
- The African Union announces the composition of the Ad hoc High Level Committee on Libya

=== 11 March ===
- On the morning of 11 March, the first government ground troops entered Ra's Lanuf with 150 soldiers, backed up by three tanks, and managed to get to the town center. At the same time, four transport boats came in from the sea and unloaded between forty and fifty soldiers each on the beach near the Fadeel hotel. They were engaged by hard-core rebel remnants, who had not retreated from the town the previous day. Government troops captured the residential area, but the rebels continued to hold out in the oil-port facilities throughout the day and recaptured much of the town in a counteroffensive in the afternoon.
- Rebels claimed they were still in control in Zawiya; however, just a few hours later, a pro-Gaddafi rally was held in the center of the city, witnessed by 100 foreign journalists, confirming the city was retaken.

=== 12 March ===
- On 12 March, rebels fighting in Ra's Lanuf retreated in the afternoon to the town of Uqayla west of Brega. Later during the day, the government took foreign journalists to the city for confirmation of the town's fall.
- Arab League Secretary-General Amr Moussa called for a no-fly zone to be put in place after previously resisting the idea. The league met and did not allow Libyan diplomats from Gaddafi's government to join despite Gaddafi's government's request to attend. The league "called on the United Nations Security Council to impose a no-fly zone over Libya in a bid to protect civilians from air attack". Its request was announced by Omani Foreign Minister Yusuf bin Alawi bin Abdullah. He stated that all member states present at the talks agreed with this.
- The league also announced it now recognized the National Transitional Council as the government of Libya.
- Al Jazeera cameraman Ali Hassan al-Jaber was shot dead near Benghazi. He was the first journalist killed since the uprising started.

=== 13 March ===
- Before dawn on 13 March, pro-Gaddafi forces, advancing eastward from Ra's Lanuf, had taken the town of Uqayla and the village of Bisher and were heading toward Brega. Rebel forces in Brega had started a retreat for Ajdabiya. Brega was captured later in the day by pro-Gaddafi forces.
- According to human-rights watchers, Tripoli was in a state of fear as pro-Gaddafi forces arrested people along with disappearances taking place. According to residents of the city, scores of anti-government protesters had been arrested and were subjected to torture.
- Ali Atiyya, a colonel of the Libyan Air Force at the Mitiga military airport near Tripoli defected and joined the rebellion.
- Amnesty International condemned the killing of al-Jaber, the Al Jazeera journalist, the day before.
- Rebels forces returned to fight in Brega. Reports from rebels and Al Jazeera sources claimed that the rebels had recaptured the town, killing twenty-five of Gaddafi's soldiers and capturing twenty in the process. With the destruction of the Ra's Lanuf oil refinery, Gaddafi only controlled one oil refinery in Zawiya. Most military analysts believed that Gaddafi was running out of fuel; and his supply lines were vulnerable and extended.
- Al-Jazeera reported that Zawiya was being besieged by pro-Gaddafi forces, with no further details given; it was unclear whether the report was accurate or in error.

=== 14 March ===
- On the western front, government forces launched an artillery barrage on Zuwara. A group of rebels managed to fend off a military assault against a rebel checkpoint outside of the city, but within hours, government tanks had captured the city's main square. Rebels in Zuwara still launched counterattacks at night. Government warplanes also launched airstrikes on rebel targets in Ajdabiya. A few occasional clashes also took place around the outskirts of Misrata.
- Al Jazeera reported that former Libyan army commander Khalifa Haftar, who served in the Chadian–Libyan conflict, had returned to Libya to aid and support the rebels.

=== 15 March ===
- On 15 March, pro-Gaddafi troops attacked Ajdabiya. Reuters reported that civilians and rebel forces were massively retreating from Ajdabiya, giving up their position, which was confirmed by a journalist from Le Monde. Soon after, Libyan state television announced that pro-Gaddafi forces were in full control of Ajdabiya. Al Jazeera reported that the opposition's airforce has destroyed and sunk two Gaddafi warships and hit a third, off the coast of Ajdabiya and Benghazi. In the meantime, the oil town of Brega was reclaimed by pro-Gaddafi forces. Google maps show that the desert breaks away to farmland and trees near Benghazi, and the rebel tactics may have changed to withdraw into terrain that is better suited to a lightly equipped rebel force where they could try to simply bleed the government dry.
- By that evening, there were conflicting reports that rebel forces in Ajdabiya had either retreated from the city or there was still some fighting. It was confirmed that pro-Gaddafi forces had entered the city centre earlier in the day. Rebel forces claimed they repulsed the attack, while the government claimed otherwise.
- The Independent reported that four men had been arrested in Ajdabiya by the rebel forces, with evidence linking them to the death of Al Jaber, the Al Jazeera journalist who was killed near Benghazi on 12 March. Under questioning, the suspects allegedly confessed that they had been ordered to silence opposition figures and drive out international presence from territories of the protest movement. The men had five guns, some of them with silencers, and they also had night sights. Bullets from two of them matched those used to kill the journalist. Several thousands dinars were found in their pockets, but the suspects denied that the money were related to the assassination.
- Sporadic gunfights were reported inside Benghazi, as rebel forces were fighting with the Gaddafi military after the rebels began searching in Benghazi for sleeper agents working for the government.
- According to Mustafa Gheriani, an opposition spokesman, a rebel frigate seized a Greek oil tanker carrying 25,000 tons of fuel for the government.

=== 16 March ===
- On 16 March, Al Manara Media reported more defections. Two fighter jets allegedly landed at the Benghazi airport and joined the rebel forces. It was also reported that two battalions of pro-Gaddafi forces defected in Sirte, taking control of the airport. Also, Manara stated that twenty-five soldiers and an officer from the fifth battalion, who were in Misrata, also defected and joined the revolution. In Tobruk, six cars filled with pro-Gaddafi forces from the Khamis battalion surrendered to the opposition. However, no other independent media confirmed the defections.
- On 16 March, both the pro-Gaddafi forces and the opposition forces were still fighting in Ajdabiya, with neither side gaining the upper hand. By night, things were changing in the rebels' favor, as government soldiers themselves told journalists that they were facing stronger resistance from the rebels, forcing many government soldiers to retreat. Agence France-Presse reported at least twenty-six deaths in fights around Ajdabiya.
- The UN called for a ceasefire on both sides, and established a draft resolution for a no-fly zone.
- The Libyan military attacked Zintan and Misrata. In Misrata, the opposition defeated attacking pro-Gaddafi forces in the south and west corners of the city, capturing several tanks. Low-intensity warfare continued in eastern outskirts of the city, with opposition holding ground and the city in their control. At least eleven deaths were reported. The situation in Zintan was unclear.
- The New York Times announced that four of its journalists were reported missing as of 15 March. Second-hand reports indicated that the journalists may have been swept up by Libyan government forces.

== Libyan no-fly zone approved (17–18 March) ==
=== 17 March ===
- Just after midnight on 17 March, government troops successfully reoccupied the southern gate of Ajdabiya after a three-hour fight. Later in the morning government forces sealed the eastern entrance to the city and entered the small port town of Zuwetina to the northwest of Ajdabiya. Gaddafi also vowed to attack Benghazi that same night. He promised amnesty to rebels that laid down their arms but said his forces would show "no mercy" to those that continued fighting. Rebel leader Mustafa Abdul Jalil said the rebels would stand firm and would not be intimidated.
- Washington shifted its position to support aggressive armed action against Gaddafi's forces. US Ambassador to the UN Susan Rice pushed for the Security Council to approve a no-fly zone and aerial bombing of Gaddafi's army in today's vote. The council was also to consider the possibility of placing the money in Gaddafi's frozen accounts in the US under rebel control to help them purchase weapons. Gaddafi threatened to retaliate against air and sea traffic in the Mediterranean Sea if Libya is attacked.
- The day marked the first time the rebel forces used aircraft and heavy armor to launch a counterattack at Ajdabiya. A helicopter raid eventually stopped the Gaddafi army from progressing any further. Pro-Gaddafi elements of the air force responded by bombing the Benghazi airport. Two pro-Gaddafi fighter jets were shot down in the attack, with little damage to the airport.
- Avaaz.org announced that over one million signatures had been collected through Avaaz.org from all over the world, for the imposition of a no-fly zone in Libya.
- Politiken reported that Folketing, the Danish parliament, was prepared to send the Royal Danish Air Force to Libya to enforce a no-fly zone, even if the UN was unable to agree on intervention. The article also has reported of a family in Ajdabiya that witnessed airstrikes on the city's hospital, bus station and various blocks of flats.
- US State department official William Burns said the opposition Libyan National Council might set up an office in Washington DC.
- A Maltese newspaper, The Times, reported that activists were attempting to block an oil shipment to Tripoli that would have departed from Malta. According to the activists, the deal was made by Yahya Ibrahim Gaddafi, an official from a Libyan state oil company.
- The United Nations Security Council adopted UN Resolution 1973, which authorized member states "to take all necessary measures... to protect civilians and civilian populated areas under threat of attack in the Libyan Arab Jamhariya, including Benghazi, while excluding an occupation force". The vote was 10–0 with five abstentions. China and Russia, both of which have veto power, abstained, as did Brazil, India and Germany. The Guardian reported that the US, Britain, France and several Arab states, would join forces to throw a protective ring around the rebel stronghold of Benghazi within hours of the vote. Reuters reported that Italian Defense Minister Ignazio La Russa announced that Italy would serve as a base for any military action against Libya.
- According to Al Jazeera, a few hours before the UN voting, Gaddafi stated in Portugal's public media that "The UN Security Council has no mandate. We don't acknowledge their resolutions. If the world is crazy, we will be crazy too". On the contrary, after the voting, Libyan Deputy Foreign Minister Khalid Kaim stated to reporters in Tripoli that his government is ready for the ceasefire decision, but requires an interlocutor to discuss how to implement it.
- The Wall Street Journal reported that Egypt's military had begun shipping arms to the rebel forces in Libya several days beforehand.

=== 18 March ===
- Rebel fighters began attacking government positions near the western mountain town of Nalut. One rebel fighter was reported killed, and four pro-Gaddafi fighters were claimed to have been killed, along with 18 captured.
- The Gaddafi government announced an immediate ceasefire in accordance with the UN Security Council resolution. saying it "accepts that it is obliged to accept the U.N. resolution" and that it was acting to protect its civilians from likely military action which had been authorized by the UN Security Council resolution.
- In the evening, pro-Gaddafi forces were reported to approach Benghazi, with clashes occurring at Magroun and Suluq which are about 50 kilometres (31 mi) from the city. However, the government stated that it was the rebels who were advancing against their positions in Magroun. This was later confirmed by Agence France-Presse. Also, there was fighting in the port town of Zuwetina, where a government force had landed from the sea the previous day and taken the town. The rebels had been besieging them since then. According to the rebels, several of their fighters, along with a number of civilians, were killed and they also claimed to have captured twenty government soldiers. Later, anti-aircraft fire following a loud explosion was heard in Benghazi.

== Coalition intervention begins (19 March) ==
International military operations in Libya began on 19 March.

== See also ==
- List of modern conflicts in North Africa
- Arab Spring
- National Transitional Council
