= Tripoli Central Hospital =

Tripoli Central Hospital (in Arabic: مستشفى طرابلس المركزي)

Geography
- Location: Tripoli, Libya
- Coordinates: 32°52′26.40″N 13°8′37.41″E

Organisation
- Type: • Teaching hospital • Trauma center

History
- Former name: L'Ospedale Coloniale di Vittorio Emanuele III
- Founded: Pre-1910

Links
- Lists: Hospitals in Libya

The Tripoli Central Hospital (in Arabic: مستشفى طرابلس المركزي) is a general hospital, located in Tripoli, Libya.

Tripoli's second-largest hospital, it is located downtown and occupies a big complete block between Zawia Street (شارع الزاويه) and Saidi Street (شارع السيدي.).

It houses the city's main and the oldest trauma center as well Libya's first and only organ-transplantation program.

== History ==
It was built on a piece of land that was occupied by some smaller clinics around Assaidi Street. These clinics used to care for patients with [tuberculosis] during the 1920s. The clinics were known locally as " Assomaa Alhamra ", which literally means the red [minaret], which was named because of " Assomaa Alhamra mosque " which has a red minaret in Assaidi street.

The main buildings that are standing now were built during the Italian administration of Libya in 1910. It was known as L'Ospedale Coloniale di Vittorio Emanuele III (or Vittorio Emanuele III Colonial Hospital). The service during those days used to be headed by Italian doctors.

Notable among them was Tomaso Casoni (1880–1933) who practiced there from 1912 to 1932. He described a test for diagnosing hydatid disease based on dermal hypersensitivity known after him as the Casoni test. The original building is still standing and is occupied by the hospital's surgery department.

== Today ==
The hospital continues to serve as the main trauma center in downtown Tripoli. During last three decades of the 20th century, it served as the sole trauma center for all of Tripoli.

It is also one of the main two teaching hospitals for the Al Fateh University's medical-sciences department, the other being the Tripoli Medical Center.

In 2005, the Libyan National organ transplantation program was initiated. A building annexed to the old surgery serve as the transplantation department.

Outpatients clinics and departments dealt with approximately 250,000 cases in 2019.

== See also ==
- Health in Libya
- List of buildings and structures in Libya
