= Giulio Lega =

Italian WWI flying ace

- Born: 12 November 1892; Florence, Kingdom of Italy
- Died: 11 July 1973 (aged 80)
- Military career
- Allegiance: Italy
- Branch: Flying service
- Rank: Capitano
- Units: 21a Squadriglia, 81a Squadriglia, 76a Squadriglia
- Awards: Silver and Bronze awards of Medal for Military Valor, Croce di Guerra

Capitano Giulio Lega was a World War I flying ace credited with five aerial victories. After finishing the war, he completed medical school, and began a near lifelong career caring for the Italian Chamber of Deputies.

== Early life and service ==
Giulio Lega was born in Florence on 12 November 1892. He was a medical student when he was accepted for officer's training in 1915. Because of his height, he became an "extended infantryman" in the Grenadiers. He went into action with their 2o Reggimento and made his mark with them at the Fourth Battle of the Isonzo. On 20 November 1915, he was awarded the War Merit Cross for valor. He fought through May 1916, winning a Bronze Medal for Military Valor in close-quarters combat, awarded on the battlefield on 30 May 1916.

== Aerial service ==
Lega volunteered for aviation in late 1916. He qualified as a pilot on 1 September 1916, and was granted his license on 1 November 1916. By 30 January 1917, he had finished pilot's training, as he was then posted to reconnaissance duty with 21a Squadriglia. He was further rated in Savoia-Pomilio SP.2s on 14 February 1917; he was also promoted to tenente. His duties as a reconnaissance pilot between May and November 1917 earned Lega a Silver Medal for Military Valor. He remained with this squadron until it was withdrawn from service in the wake of the Battle of Caporetto. He was selected for fighter pilot training, which he began on 16 November 1917 at Malpensa. When that was complete, he went for gunnery training; on 27 December 1917, he passed his gunnery test with a "mediocre" rating. Lega then returned to action as a member of 76a Squadriglia. He would fly 46 combat sorties with them.

On 17 March 1918, he teamed with two other Italian pilots for his first victory. Eight days later, he again split a victory, this time over Montello. His final victories came during the last Austro-Hungarian offensive. On 24 June 1918, he downed a Hansa-Brandenburg C.I from Flik 2d. The following day, he shot down an Albatros D.III from Flik 42j and shared a second win with Silvio Scaroni and Romolo Ticconi. This string of victories earned him another Silver Medal for Valor.

In July 1918, Lega transferred to the 81st Squadriglia. He would serve through war's end with no further victories. By the Armistice, he had earned a Bronze Medal for Valor, as well as the two Silver ones and the War Cross.

== Post World War I ==
Lega finished his medical studies, though briefly interrupted by a recall to military duty. He graduated from the University of Bologna in July 1920. He remained in the Air Force Reserves, and would eventually rise to tenente colonnello in May 1935. On 13 March 1931, he was appointed head of the medical service for Italy's Chamber of Deputies. During World War II, Lega would be assigned to the headquarters of the Servizi Aerei Speciali. He would not give up his post with the Chamber until 1957.

He eventually qualified as a university instructor. When he died on 11 July 1973, he was still a medical consultant to the Italian parliament.
