= Giorgio Michetti =

Italian flying ace (1888–1966)

- Born: May 29, 1888; Francavilla al Mare, Kingdom of Italy
- Died: February 4, 1966 (aged 77); Rome, Italy
- Relatives: Francesco Paolo Michetti (father)
- Military career
- Allegiance: Italy
- Branch: Flying service
- Rank: Tenente Colonnello
- Units: 43a Squadriglia, 76a Squadriglia
- Awards: 2 Silver awards of Medal for Military Valor
- Other work: Promoted Italian aviation sales in Argentina

Tenente Colonnello Giorgio Michetti (May 29, 1888 - February 4, 1966) was a World War I flying ace credited with five aerial victories.

== Early life and service ==
Giorgio Michetti was born in Francavilla al Mare, Kingdom of Italy on 29 May 1888. He was the son of famous painter Francesco Paolo Michetti. The younger Michetti was raised in a bohemian household on the Adriatic seafront; he grew up in a progressive atmosphere, knowing Gabriele d'Annunzio. Giorgio Michetti served his conscription duty in 1905. Ten years later, he was recalled to military service when Italy entered World War I.

== World War I ==
Michetti originally served with the 27th Field Artillery Regiment, but volunteered for aviation. On 1 August 1915, he was forwarded for aviation training at Cameri as an aspirant. Beginning 26 March 1916, he was posted to a reconnaissance unit, rank sergente. By January 1917, he was serving with 43a Squadriglia, where he first met Silvio Scaroni. On 20 June 1917, he went off to fighter training on Nieuports at Malpensa, and was commissioned. He moved to Pisa for a quick gunnery course on 25 July. On 29 July 1917, he was posted to 76a Squadriglia and reunited with Scaroni. During the next few months, he clocked up flying time for experience, but had few brushes with the enemy. It was probably during this era that Michetti played one of the practical jokes for which he was noted; he bombed the Austro-Hungarians with a bag full of rats. On the day after Christmas, he scored his first victory, being one of several winners over a German DFW C.I. His old friend Scaroni shared in the victory, as did Antonio Riva and three British fliers. The victory, shared or not, won Michetti a Silver Medal for Military Valor.

On 12 March 1918, while landing at Casoni, Michetti rammed a plane from 22a Squadriglia. Although the airmen escaped with minor injuries, both planes were totally destroyed. On the 21st, he unsuccessfully claimed to share a victory with Scaroni; the victory was awarded solely to the latter. On 3 May 1918, he shared his second confirmed aerial victory with Flavio Baracchini. Michetti then downed three more enemy planes during May and June. He ended this string on 24 June 1918, when his fifth confirmed win made him an ace. June would also see him awarded a second Silver Medal for Military Valor. He would stake one more unsuccessful claim in August. In September 1918, he was assigned to Aerial Gunnery School; the war ended while he was still in this slot.

== Post World War I ==
On 1 February 1919, an Italian military intelligence committee released its evaluation of World War I aerial victory claims. Michetti was deemed to have downed five enemy planes in combination with other pilots; however, other claims he had filed were awarded as sole victories to Romolo Ticconi and Silvio Scaroni. At about the same time in 1919, Michetti and Scaroni promoted Italian aircraft sales in a visit to Argentina. The 350a Squadriglia was formed just for this purpose. On 20 June 1919, Michetti flew an attention-grabbing round trip flight between Buenos Aires and Montevideo in 3 hours 5 minutes.

Nothing more is known of Michetti until he was divorced in Austria in May 1935. The following year, he moved to Rome. He was promoted to Tenente Colonnello in the Italian Air Force reserves in 1938.

Giorgio Michetti died in Rome on 4 February 1966.
