= Alessandro Buzio =

Italian World War I flying ace

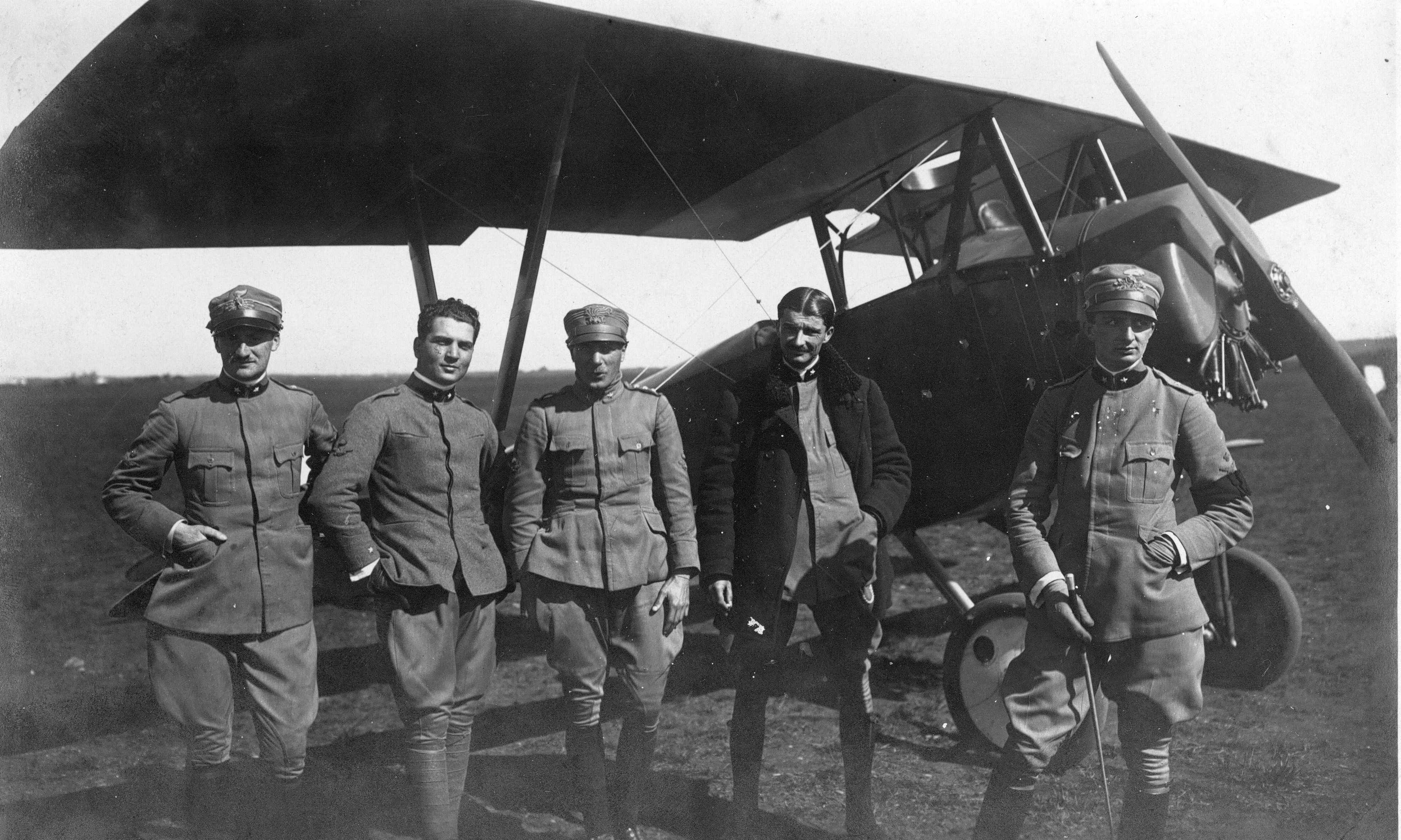
- Born: 13 January 1893; Pavia, Italy
- Died: 1 October 1972 (aged 79)
- Military career
- Allegiance: Italy
- Branch: Aviation
- Rank: Tenente Colonnello
- Units: 75a Squadriglia, 81a Squadriglia, 76a Squadriglia
- Awards: Medal for Military Valor

Tenente Colonnello Alessandro Buzio was an Italian World War I flying ace credited with six aerial victories, four of them shared.

== Early life and service ==
Alessandro Buzio was born in Pavia on 13 January 1893. He studied accounting in school. On 13 December 1913, he reported for his reserve officer training in military service with the 1st Engineers Regiment. After earning a couple of promotions in the enlisted ranks, Buzio was commissioned as a Sottotenente in the 5th Engineers Regiment on 8 November 1914.

== Aerial service in World War I ==
On 23 May 1915, Buzio was assigned to aviation duty. He began pilot's training on 9 June 1915. On 7 December 1915, he was awarded his military pilot's license.

By February 1916, Buzio was flying Macchi Parasols. On 24 April 1916, he was posted to 75a Squadriglia. On 27 June 1916, he scored his first aerial victory in concert with Guido Nardini and other Italian pilots. This feat earned him a Bronze Medal for Military Valor. In October 1916, he was promoted to Tenente.

On 27 April 1917, he was posted to the 81a Squadriglia. He would score another shared victory while with this squadron, and be awarded a Silver Medal for Military Valor. He would score his third victory with 76a Squadriglia on 22 September 1917, though records show his official transfer as being on 1 November. He would score three more times with 76a, with a couple of shared victories on 3 May 1918 rounding off his tally.

On 15 July 1918, during the Battle of the Piave River, Buzio managed to taxi his Hanriot Scout airplane into that of Lieutenant J. W. Davis of No. 66 Squadron RAF in a ground accident.

== Post World War I ==
A postwar committee from military intelligence vetted the wartime aerial victory claims and released verification on 1 February 1919. Alessandro Buzio was credited with five confirmed victories.

Buzio served in the air force reserves in the 1930s. In 1940, he left flight status as a Tenente Colonnello. Alessandro Buzio died on 1 October 1972.
