= Scaroni =

Scaroni is a surname of Italian origin. Notable people with the surname include:

- Christian Scaroni (born 1997), Italian cyclist
- Paolo Scaroni (born 1946), Italian businessman
- Silvio Scaroni (1893–1977), Italian World War I fighter pilot
- Susannah Scaroni (born 1991), American Paralympic athlete

== See also ==
- Scaroni crime family
