= 76a Squadriglia =

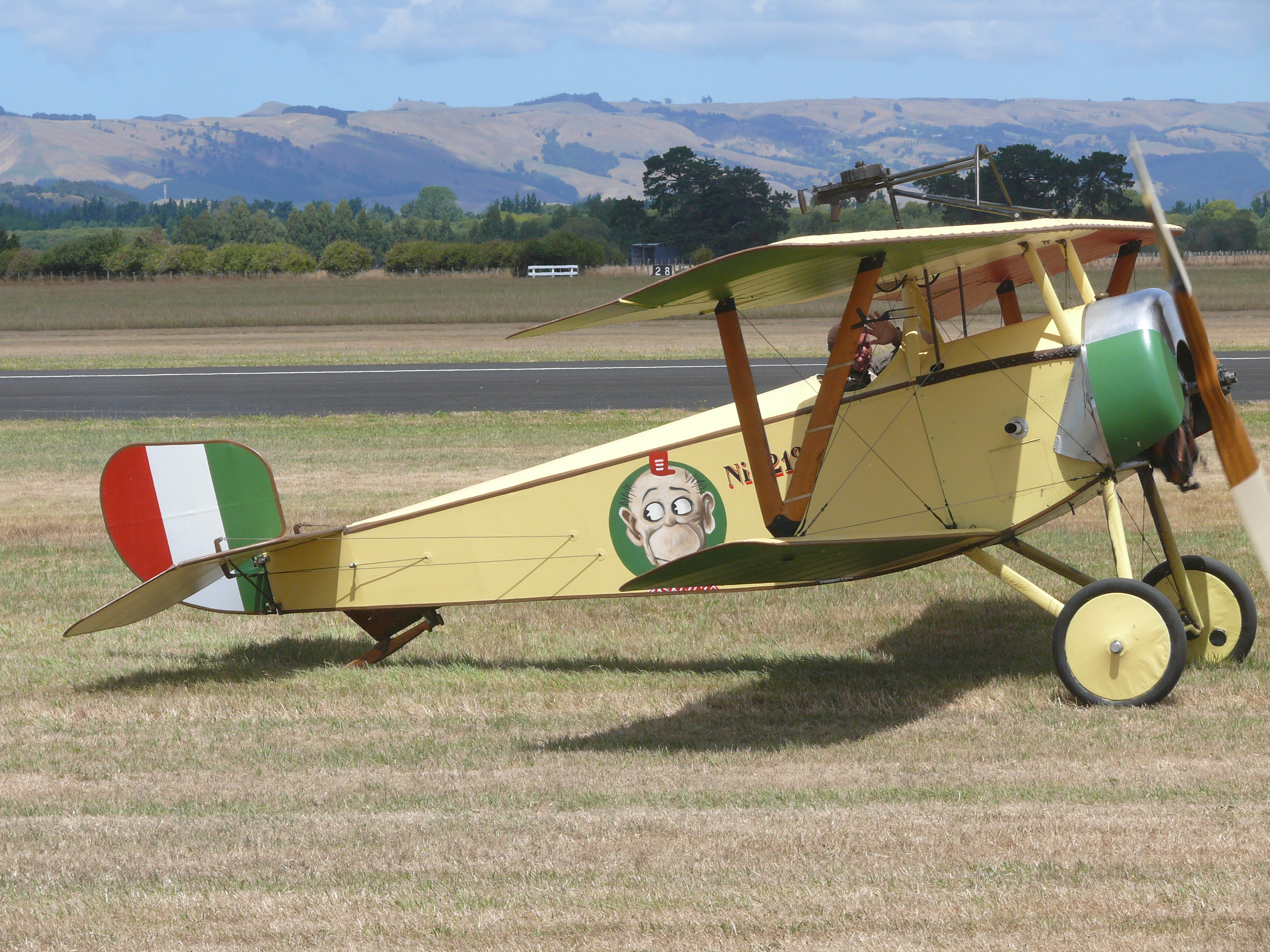
- Nieuport 11
- Active: Founded 25 May 1916
- Country: Kingdom of Italy
- Allegiance: Italy
- Branch: Corpo Aeronautico Militare
- Type: Fighter squadron
- Engagements: World War I

Aircraft flown
- Fighter: Nieuport 11; Hanriot HD.1

76a Squadriglia of the Corpo Aeronautico Militare was one of Italy's original fighter squadrons, being founded during World War I on 25 May 1916. On 30 May 1916, the new unit began its combat career. Between 22 April and 3 October 1917, three of its commanding officers became casualties. It was drawn into the air fighting over Caporetto in late 1917, and forced to retreat three times during November as a consequence of the Italian defeat.

76a Squadriglia continued to serve through war's end, by which time they had been credited with 69 aerial victories at the cost of four dead.

== History ==
76a Squadriglia was founded during World War I, on 25 May 1916, as one of Italy's original fighter squadrons. It began at La Comina, with five pilots and four Nieuport 11 planes. Two days later, it was attached to 1o Gruppo. On 30 May, it flew its first combat mission. Mario Stoppani scored the squadron's first victory on 18 July 1916.

On 22 April 1917, the squadron began a string of command casualties, as it had two commanders killed and another wounded during the year (see below). Then the Battle of Caporetto defeat, with its forced retreat, caused 76a Squadriglia to relocate quickly thrice in November 1917. Once joined to 6o Gruppo, the squadron re-equipped with Hanriot HD.1s. The squadron took place in the famous air battle above its home base of Istrana on 26 December 1917.

Night bombing raids by Austro-Hungarian aircraft prompted squadron relocations on 2 and 17 February 1918. Once settled at Casoni, the squadriglia served through the war's end in the dissolution of its opponent, the Austro-Hungarian Empire. The squadron still had 19 pilots and 17 aircraft in service. It had fought 340 combats during its 5,088 wartime sorties and staked claim to 69 victories. 76a Squadriglia had paid a blood price of four killed.

== Commanding officers ==
- Capitano Ettore de Carolis: 25 May 1916 until promoted out
- Luigi Olivi: 22 April 1917 - KIA 17 June 1917
- Capitano Salvatori Calori: 1 July 1917 - 11 August 1917
- Tenente Gastone Novelli: 11 August 1917 - WIA 21 August 1917
- Tenente Francesco di Rudini: 28 September 1917 - KIA 3 October 1917
- Capitano Alberto De Bernardi: From 1 November 1917
- Capitano Amerigo Notari: 9 September 1918 through war's end

== Duty stations ==
- La Comina: From 25 May 1916
- Borgnano: From 24 February 1917
- Aviano: November 1917
- Arcade: November 1917
- Istrana: November 1917
- Isola di Carturo: 2 February 1918
- Casoni: 17 February 1918 through war's end

== Notable members ==
- Silvio Scaroni, 26 confirmed aerial victories. Others who became aces (scored at least five victories) within the squadron's ranks:
  - Flavio Baracchini
  - Luigi Olivi
  - Romolo Ticconi
  - Giorgio Michetti
  - Giulio Lega
  - Mario Stoppani

== Aircraft ==
- Nieuport 11: Original equipment
- Hanriot HD.1: Late 1917
