= Casoni =

Casoni is a surname. Notable people with the surname include:

- Bernard Casoni (born 1961), French football manager and player
- Filippo Casoni (1733–1811), Italian Roman Catholic cardinal
- Filippo Casoni (bishop) (1599–1659), Italian Roman Catholic bishop
- Giulia Casoni (born 1978), Italian tennis player
- Lorenzo Casoni (1645–1720), Italian Roman Catholic cardinal
- Tomaso Casoni (1880–1933), Italian physician

== See also ==
- Casoni test
