= Mario Stoppani =

Italian World War I flying ace

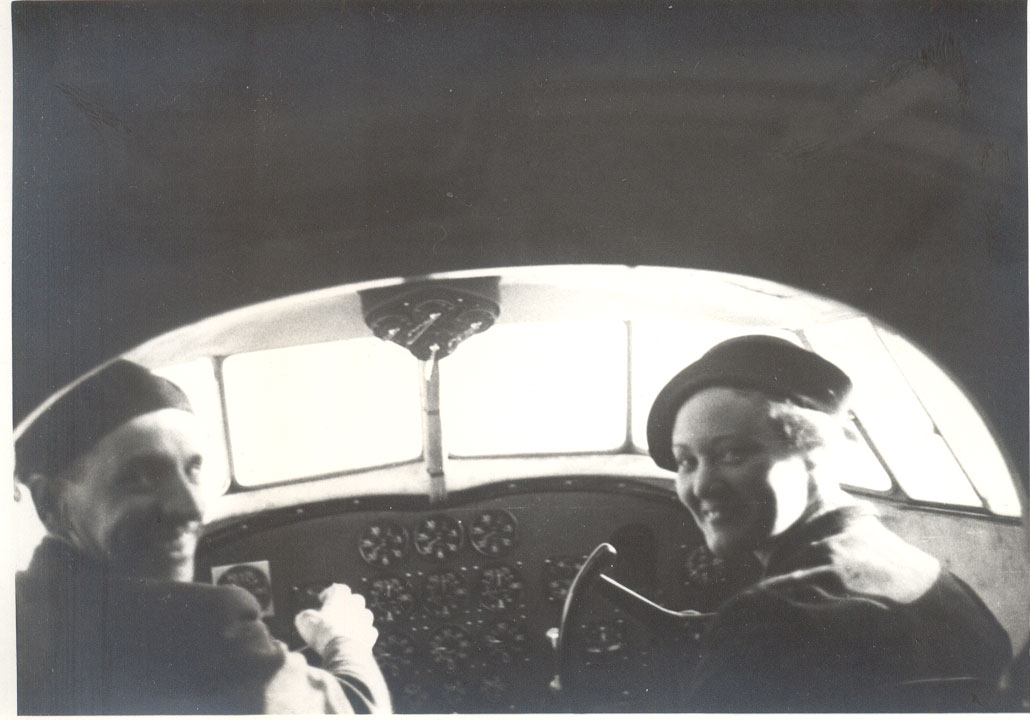
- Mario Stoppani (left)
- Born: 24 May 1895; Lovere, Kingdom of Italy
- Died: 20 September 1959 (aged 64)
- Military career
- Allegiance: Italy
- Branch: Aviation
- Rank: Sergente
- Units: 76a Squadriglia, 3a Squadriglia
- Awards: 2 Silver awards of Medal for Military Valor, Russian Cross of St. George, both a Silver and a Gold Medal of Aeronautic Valor
- Other work: Made 15 first flights and set 41 aviation records

Mario Stoppani (24 May 1895 – 20 September 1959) was an Italian World War I flying ace credited with six aerial victories. His valor earned him two Silver awards of the Medal for Military Valor and the Russian Cross of St. George during World War I.

After the war, after a short spell as an aviation instructor, in 1927 Stoppani began a long career as a test pilot and an extensive career setting aeronautical records. He would continue as a test pilot throughout World War II and beyond. While associated with aeronautical designer Filippo Zappata, Stoppani would make 15 first flights and set 41 aeronautical records, one of which still stands. In the course of these feats, Stoppani earned both a Silver and a Gold Medal for Aeronautical Valour. Post World War II, he worked for Breda and SIAI Marchetti.

== Early life ==
Mario Stoppani was born in Lovere, in what is now the province of Bergamo. He apprenticed as an auto mechanic at age 15, circa 1910. On 6 November 1913, he enlisted in the Battaglione Aviatori (Aviators' Battalion). In February 1915, he was selected for pilot's training at Pisa.

== World War I ==
In June 1915, Stoppani was posted to an operational unit, 3a Squadriglia. Based at Medeuzza, he flew a Macchi Parasol on reconnaissance patrols. He was awarded a Silver Medal for Military Valour for his exploits during August through November 1915.

In January 1916, he was seconded to instructor duty at Malpensa. He stayed there until May, when he was assigned to newly formed 76a Squadriglia, based at La Comina. Flying a Nieuport 11, he scored his first aerial victory on 9 July 1916, sharing it with Luigi Olivari. By 1 December 1916, he had tallied five more, including a shared win with Luigi Olivi. He was recommended for a second Silver Medal for Military Valour in November; that same month, he was asked to become a test pilot for Ansaldo.

In January 1917, Stoppani was awarded the Russian Cross of Saint George, Third Class. In March, he moved to Genoa to begin his duties with Ansaldo by testing the Ansaldo A.1 Balilla and SVA. In June 1917, he finally received his second Silver Medal. Stoppani finished out the war as a test pilot. He scored all of his victories flying in the Nieuport 11, becoming one of the most successful pilots in the type.

== Post World War I ==
Stoppani made a career of aviation. He became an instructor with SAI, first at Foggia, then at Passignano sul Trasimeno in 1925. In 1927, he moved to Trieste and resumed test piloting, for SISA Airline. He then became the chief test pilot for CANT aircraft company until mid-World War II, circa 1943. During his career with CANT, he was closely associated with designer Filippo Zappata; the association led to Stoppani making fifteen first flights and setting 41 flying records. Stoppani was awarded both a Silver and Gold Medal for Aeronautical Valour for his efforts. He still holds the distance record for a seaplane in a closed circuit; in 1937, he covered 3,231 miles without landing, piloting a CRDA CANT Z.506.

After World War II, he worked for Breda and SIAI Marchetti. Mario Stoppani died on 20 September 1959.

== Sources ==
- Franks, Norman; Guest, Russell; Alegi, Gregory. Above the War Fronts: The British Two-seater Bomber Pilot and Observer Aces, the British Two-seater Fighter Observer Aces, and the Belgian, Italian, Austro-Hungarian and Russian Fighter Aces, 1914–1918: Volume 4 of Fighting Airmen of WWI Series: Volume 4 of Air Aces of WWI. Grub Street, 1997. ISBN 1-898697-56-6, ISBN 978-1-898697-56-5.
- Franks, Norman. Nieuport Aces of World War 1. Osprey Publishing, 2000. ISBN 1-85532-961-1, ISBN 978-1-85532-961-4.
