= Francesco Paolo Michetti =

Italian painter (1851–1929)

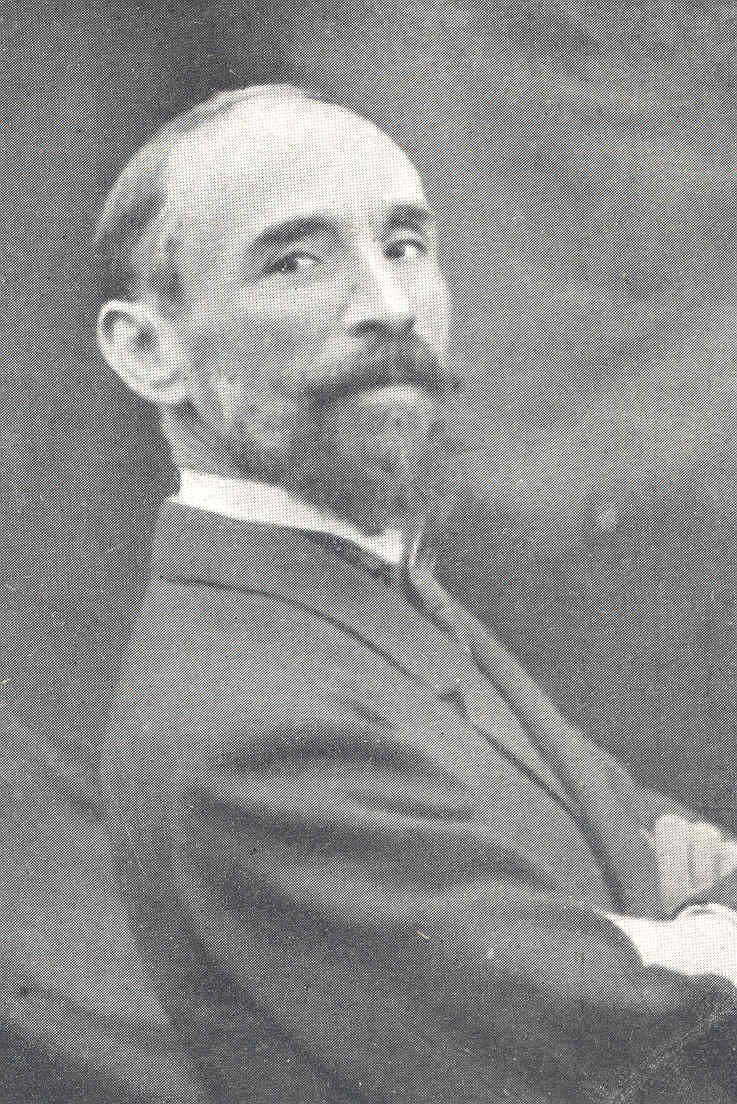
- Michetti in 1900
- Born: October 2, 1851; Tocco da Casauria, Chieti (now Pescara), Abruzzo, Kingdom of the Two Sicilies
- Died: March 5, 1929 (aged 77); Francavilla al Mare, Chieti, Abruzzo, Italy
- Education: Accademia di Belle Arti di Roma
- Occupation: Painter
- Children: 3, including Giorgio

Francesco Paolo Michetti (October 2, 1851 – March 5, 1929) was an Italian painter known especially for his genre works.

== Biography ==
He was born in Tocco da Casauria in the Province of Chieti. His father having died when he was a boy, Michetti was forced to work with a local artisan. In 1868, Michetti was awarded a stipend by the province to study at the Accademia (now Istituto) in Naples under Domenico Morelli. Among his colleagues was Eduardo Dalbono. There he also interacted with Filippo Palizzi, Giuseppe De Nittis, and Marco De Gregorio, artists of the School of Resina. Disciplinary problems soon caused Michetti to return to Chieti. He began to spend time in Francavilla a Mare, which by 1878 would be his residence.

He traveled to Paris, encouraged and supported by De Nittis, by the patron Beniamino Rotondo, and by the art merchant Reutlinger. In Paris, he exhibited in the Salon of 1872: Ritorno dall’erbaggio, Dream of Innocence, and The Pumpkin Harvest. He also exhibited at Salons in 1875 and 1876. In 1874, he befriended the Spanish painter Mariano Fortuny, whose use of color strongly influenced Michetti.

In 1877, with his Corpus Christi Procession, a highly colorful, effervescent depiction of a festival, he became recognized as one of the best in the schools exhibition. The next year in Paris, he exhibited Springtime and Love, a depiction of families enjoying a hilltop above a village with a broad view of the sea and sky.

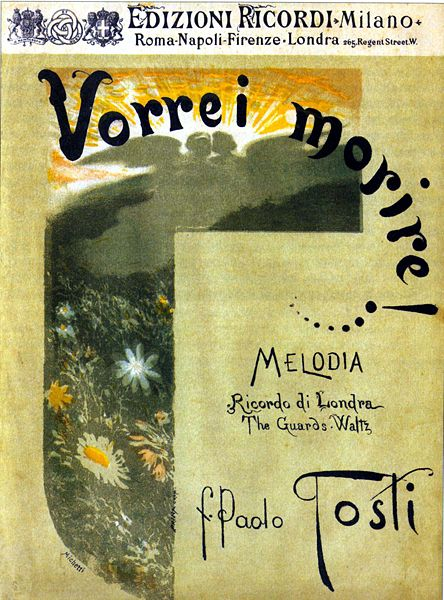
Libretto Cover for Opera by Paolo Tosti

At the 1880 National Exposition in Turin, Michetti exhibited Palm Sunday, the Pescatrici di londine, and i Morticelli. Gubernatis remarks on the vivaciousness of these works, and says:

To some it seemed that the success of Naples had intoxicated the mind of the young artist, and they bitterly deplored that having been led astray in search of the strange and far-fetched, he had suffered shipwreck in the indecipherable. Others proclaimed that these paintings established his indisputable fame. Certainly those works had greater success than they deserved. Everywhere there was exaggeration, and Michetti had abandoned himself to his flaws, his enthusiasm as a colorist resulting in a display that often bordered on the Baroque, so that sometimes the thrill of his palette convulsed the criteria of the artist. But alongside these defects were revealed most positive qualities: the feeling and poetry of the real, unlike many others, even among the best, who do not see anything beyond their given direction of art, beyond the school with which they are affiliated.

At the 1881 Exhibition of Milan, he was a prolific exhibitor with 34 paintings, mostly studies of faces, full of sentiment, and seascapes, full of windblown sails. Gubernatis states that it was "a phantasmagory of form and color, that reveals the fecundity and courage of the artist". The painting Il Voto describes the zealous and ecstatic devotion of lower classes for an icon and reliquary.

He is described as having a "temperament violent yet refined, restless, irrepressibly investigational". While he lived at a picturesque Francavilla al mare, and is known for his genre and pastoral scenes, his output included historic and religious themes. He favored pastels as a medium for sketches and portraits.

Later in life, he was awarded recognition. In 1896 he was named a member of the Accademia Pontaniana of Naples; in 1903, he was admitted in to the Roman Academy of St Luke; and in 1911 was named honorary president of the regional committee for the Esposizione pescarese nel 1911, in 1913 he was named to the commissione ordinatrice della Galleria nazionale d’arte moderna of Rome. In June 1909, he was nominated to be an Italian senator. He had three children, Elvira Michetti, Giorgio Michetti and Liberato Michetti. His son, Giorgio Michetti, was a World War I flying ace.

Francesco Paolo Michetti died in Francavilla al Mare on March 5, 1929, after contracting pneumonia.

== Gallery ==
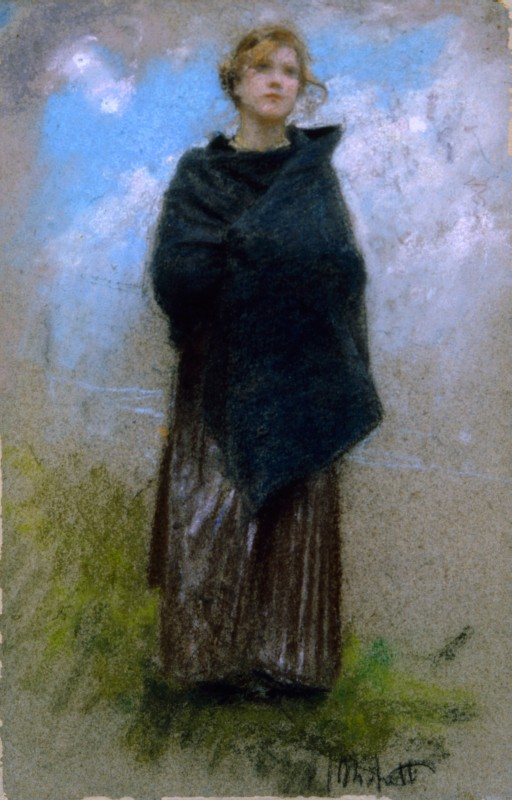
Shepherdess,
c. 1900

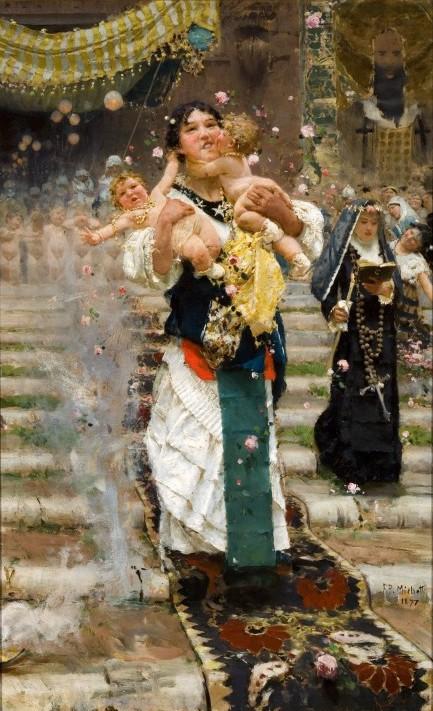
Mommy, 1877

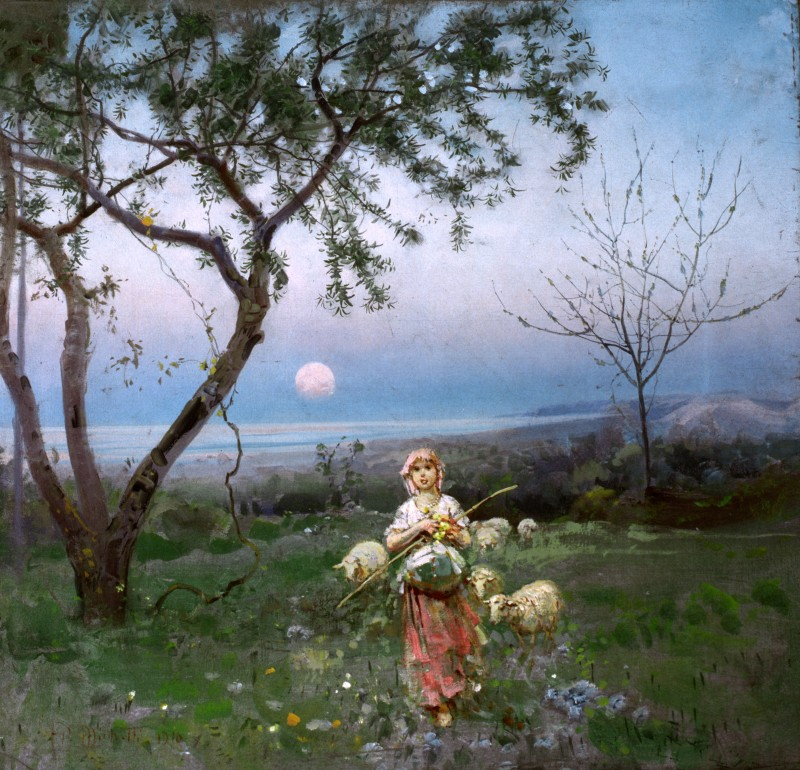
Landscape with Shepherds, 1910

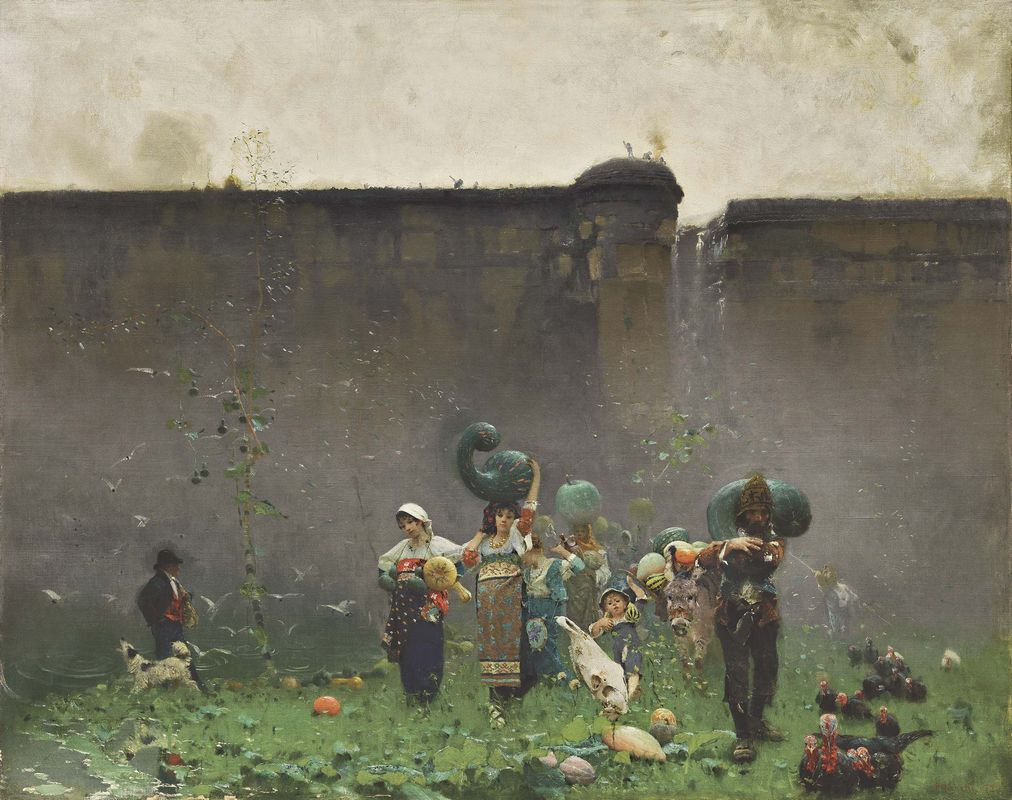
The Harvest of Pumpkins, 1873

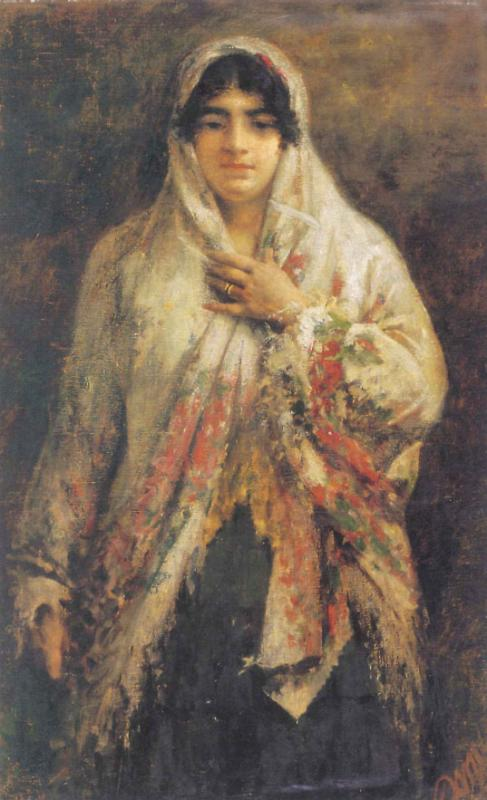
Southern Woman, c.1880
