= Health in Libya =

A health care crisis currently exists in Libya due to the ongoing conflict.

== History ==
There has been a crisis in the health system in Libya since the Libyan Revolution in 2011. Prior to the Libyan Revolution health training, rehabilitation, education, housing, family issues, disability and old-age benefits were all regulated by "Decision No. 111" (dated December 9, 1999) of the General People's Committee on the Promulgation of the By-Law Enforcement Law No. 20 of 1998 on the Social Care Fund. The health care system combines state-run facilities and small private hospitals. In comparison to other states in the Middle East, the health status of the population is above average. Childhood immunization is almost universal. The clean water supply has increased and sanitation has improved. The country's major hospitals are in Tripoli and Benghazi.

== Demographics ==
Libya's population in 2015 was 6.3 million which means that the population increased by 32.6% over a period of 25 years. In 2015, 17.1% of the inhabitants were between 15 and 24 years old and literacy for this age group was 99.9%. For adult males literacy was 89.9% versus 83.7% for adult females. In 2012, life expectancy was 75. "The out-of-pocket expenditure share is 29.7% (2013) and the health workforce density (2009) is 19.0 physicians and 68.0 nurses and midwives per 10 000 population".

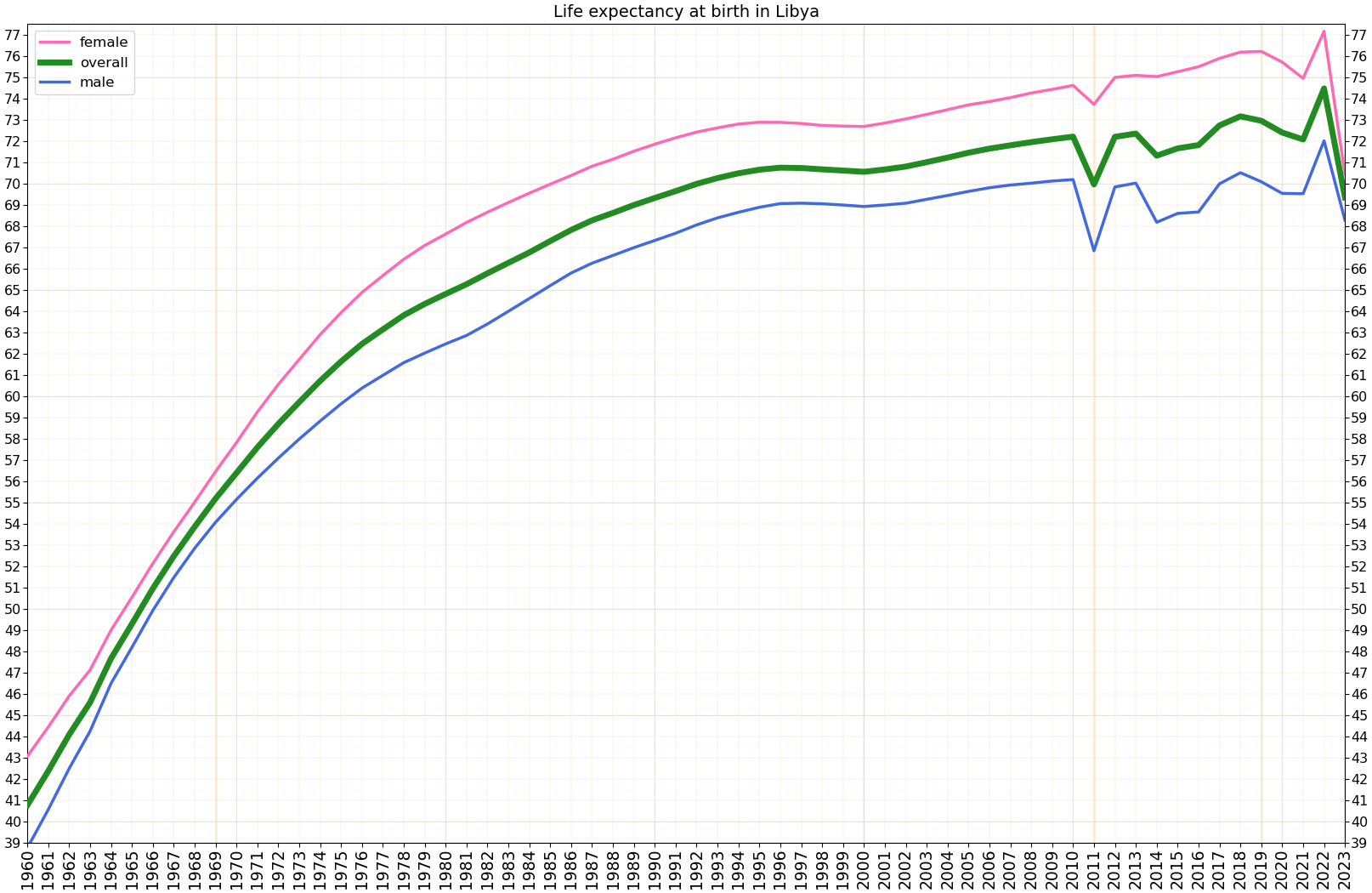
Life expectancy at birth in Libya

| Total population | 6.3 million |
| Population growth rate% per year (2010) | 2.8% |
| Crude birth rate per 1000 people (2010) | 24.9% |
| Crude death rate per 1000 people (2010) | 4.1% |
| Life expectancy at birth years (2008) | 72.3 |
| Fertility rate (number of births per woman) (2012) | 2.41 |
| Urban population % of total (2010) | 86% |

Source: General Authority of Information, Libya.

== Medical education ==
Medical schools got off to a promising start in the 1970s. With the discovery of oil in the early 1960s, many students were sponsored by the Libyan government to study medicine in European and North American universities. This led to the establishment of the first generation of Libyan doctors and academics who founded the first medical school in Benghazi in 1970 and a second one in Tripoli in 1973. Al-Arab Medical University was founded in 1984 through the merger of the medical school in Benghazi with other health-related schools. The same was true for University of Tripoli (University of Al-Fateh for Medical Science) in 1986. This medical education system adopted the British curriculum and English was the language of instruction.

In the period between 1987 and 2001 there was an increase in the number of medical schools in the country and 7 new schools were established in Sebha, Surt, Misurata, Zawia, Khums, Bayda and Ghayran.

== Before and after 2011 ==
A Ministry of Health report stated that Libya has 96 hospitals, 25 specialized units, 1355 basic health centers, 37 polyclinics and 17 quarantine units and in February 2009 there were 10230 doctors (17/10 000 population), 84% of them were nationals.

Although the Libyan authorities have largely invested in health services in the three decades up to 2011, which reflected positively in the population's health indicators, some significant challenges remained, most notably:

- the scarcity of national health information led to inaccurate health indicators regarding the causes of mortality and morbidity.
- the highest incidence of HIV/AIDS among intravenous drug users in the world.
- a shift in the burden of disease over the past 20 years towards noncommunicable diseases (NCDs). Other major setbacks in the country's health system included:
- Big proportion of the health workers were foreigners, especially in the southern part of the country.
- Poorly functioning primary health-care (PCH) network, particularly in the main cities (Benghazi and Tripoli).
- Many Libyan were sent for treatment abroad, which consumed a substantial proportion of the country's health expenditures.

Since the First Libyan Civil War in 2011, the Libyan health system has been adversely affected. Many factors impose serious challenges on the public health sector, such as the insufficiency of health information system, severe medical supply shortage, and loss of the health staff.

Health services are becoming progressively unavailable. For example, Al Zahra Kidney Hospital near Tripoli was severely damaged and looted during April 2015 clashes. Many hospitals in Benghazi were forced to close because of security concerns. In the meanwhile, Benghazi Medical Center (BMC) became the primary hospital for provision of health care in the city of Benghazi. The country is facing a severe shortage of medications, medical supplies, and vaccinations, which is basically caused by the lack of security and the interrupted supplies delivery. Among the shortage list are chronic disease medications like insulin, anti-tuberculosis, anti-neoplastic, and HIV/AIDS medications as well as laboratory reagents, obstetric and renal dialysis supplies and intravenous fluids. Surgical theaters are suffering from the insufficiency of anesthetics, dressing materials, and internal fixators for fractures.

The country is witnessing a wave of internal displacement, it is estimated that the total number of IDPs in Libya is 435 000 according to OCHA although the actual scale of this situation and the humanitarian needs of displaced persons is not clear. Most of the IDPs were forced to be displaced more than once, and they are scattered around 35 towns and cities. The local authorities and nongovernmental organizations(NGOs) state that the displaced population is lacking water, food, shelter, health care, and other basic commodities. On the other hand, the hosting cities and town are also facing significant pressure. Since June 2014, the food, fuel, water, medical supplies, and electricity shortage have worsened.

=== Hospitals ===
The following are some of the hospitals in Libya:

- 11 June Hospital, Tripoli, 32.86215087925601°N 13.162283605371963°E
- Abu Slim Hospital, Tripoli, 32.85724822050119°N 13.174471563001347°E
- Ain Al Hayat Hospital, Tripoli, 32.89098456356456°N 13.216442770584061°E
- Al-Jalah Hospital, Benghazi, 32.1101°N 20.0902°E
- Al Khadra Hospital, Tripoli, 32.858401811661°N 13.191294378491126°E
- Al Zahra Kidney Hospital, Tripoli
- Alsafwa International Hospital, Misrata, 32.37022952205241°N 15.11445231464231°E
- Assaba Hospital, Al Asabi'ah, 32.0513262053319°N 12.874564574117313°E
- Bani Walid Hospital, Bani Walid, 31.8765651400039°N 14.041175313803201°E
- Hekma Hospital, Misrata, 32.40867034622722°N 15.063605016001183°E
- Jalaa Maternity Hospital, Tripoli, 32.88586726932681°N 13.162541097174387°E
- Razi Psychiatric Hospital, Tripoli, 32.879280564728646°N 13.137084912193133°E
- Saint James Clinic, Tripoli, 32.887834492056975°N 13.211186668604778°E
- Tripoli Central Hospital, Tripoli, 32.88406633851484°N 13.189484385399496°E
- Tripoli Eye Hospital, Tripoli, 32.89675017484284°N 13.201079077106142°E
- Zliten Teaching Hospital, Zliten, 32.514692749930866°N 14.568533600459027°E
