= Luigi Olivi =

Italian flying ace

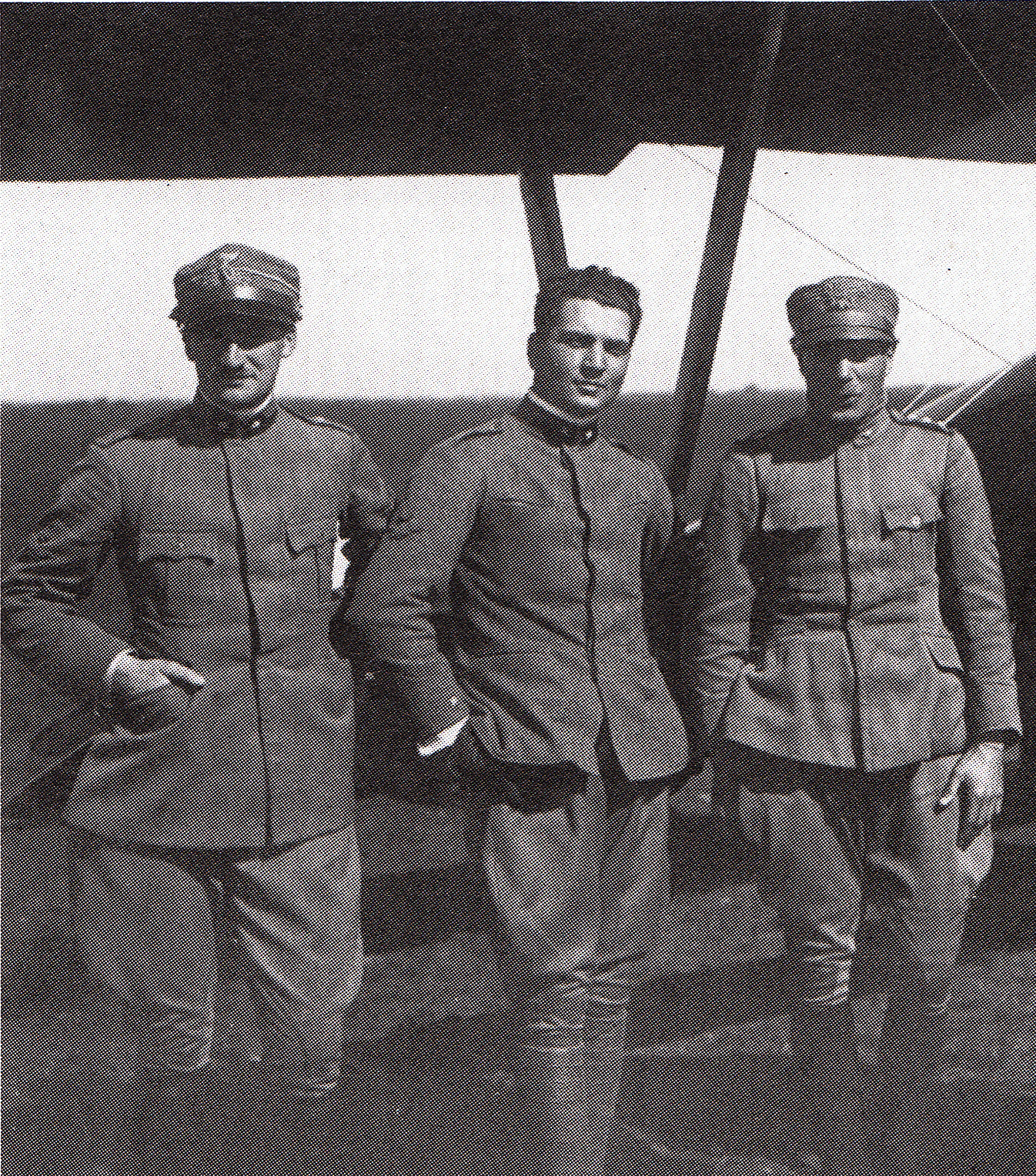
- Luigi Olivi
- Born: 18 November 1894; Campobasso, Kingdom of Italy
- Died: 17 July 1917 (aged 22); Vicinity of Moraro, Austria-Hungary
- Military career
- Allegiance: Kingdom of Italy
- Branch: Aviation
- Service years: 1914-1917
- Rank: Tenente
- Units: 2a Squadriglia per Artiglieria/42a Squadriglia, 76a Squadriglia
- Awards: 2 Silver awards of Medal for Military Valor

Tenente Luigi Olivi (1894–1917) was an Italian World War I flying ace credited with six aerial victories. He won two awards of the Silver Medal for Military Valor and was killed in action.

Olivi was born in Campobasso on 18 November 1894. He lived in Ancona prewar. He joined the Italian military before Italy entered World War I. On 31 March 1914, he was promoted to Caporal.

Olivi was promoted again, to Sergente, on 31 July 1914, and sent off to aviation school at Aviano to train on Bleriots. He received his pilot's license on 16 June 1915. On 25 October 1915, he was injured in an accident at Malpensa while flying a Macchi Parasol.

His original flying duty was artillery observation for 2a Squadriglia (later redubbed 42a Squadriglia. He then transitioned to Nieuports, training at Cascina Costa, and was assigned to 76a Squadriglia on 25 July 1916. Between 8 October 1916 and 17 June 1917, he scored six confirmed victories, including one shared with Mario Stoppani; he also had an unconfirmed claim. After his final victory, Olivi returned to take aerial photos of his final victim, and was killed in action.

Luigi Olivi had flown 217 hours on 180 combat sorties. In 48 aerial combats, he had claimed eight aerial victories, six of which were confirmed. He had been recognized with two awards of the Silver Medal for Military Valor.
