= Quryna =

Libyan newspaper

Quryna (Arabic: قورينا), formerly known as Yosberides (Arabic: يوسبريدس), is a privately owned Libyan newspaper published in print and on the internet. It is based in Benghazi, the country's second largest city. Reuters described it as "Libya's most reliable media outlet" during the Libyan Civil War.

Its chief editor is Ramadan Briki. Technical staff are Ahmad Bin Jaber and Hani Altli.

== History ==
According to its website, Quryna was first published on 20 August 2007 as a limited print newspaper and grew to a 32-page media. It is currently published online and in print nationally on Mondays. According to The Lede blog, Quryna was named after the ancient Greek colony Cyrene, Libya. The name was changed to Yosberides on 3 March 2011, but was later changed back.

It was part of the Al-Ghad Media Corporation owned by Muammar Gaddafi's son Saif al-Islam until the state took it over. Its reporting then was sympathetic to Gaddafi. When Gaddafi lost control of Benghazi in early 2011, it began to report openly and claimed to be impartial to either side of the protests. Reports, however, emerged that the paper was seized by protesters. The web site of the newspaper was registered on 6 March 2011, and the head of the main page shows the flag of the Libyan Republic, used first by the rebels and now officially as the flag of the state.
