= Acuto =

- Comune
- Comune di Acuto
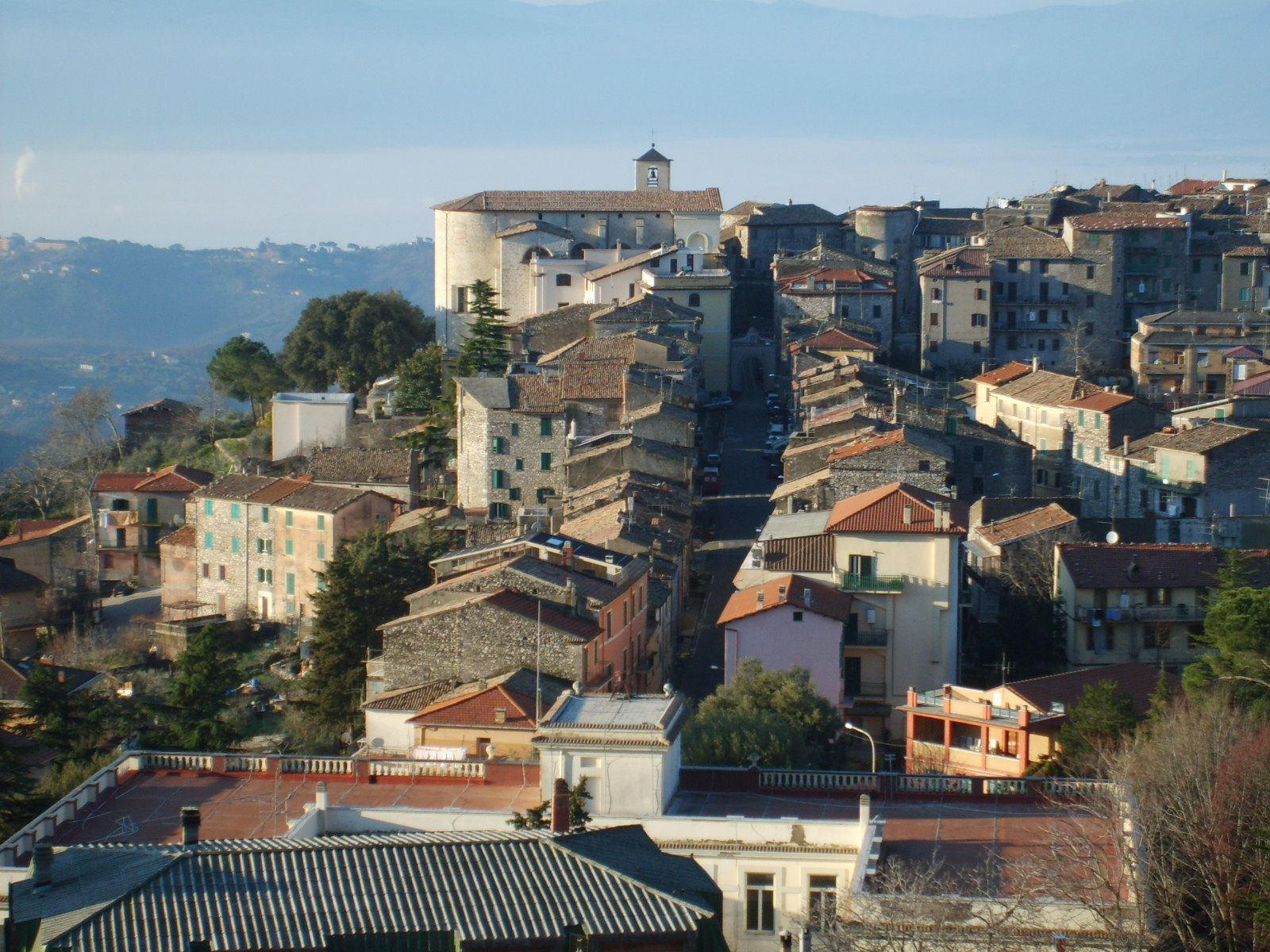
- View of Acuto

- Coat of arms

- Location of Acuto in Italy Acuto (Lazio)
- Coordinates: 41°47′N 13°11′E
- Country: Italy
- Region: Lazio
- Province: Frosinone (FR)

Government
  - Mayor: Augusto Agostini

Area
  - Total: 13.4 km^{2} (5.2 sq mi)
- Elevation: 724 m (2,375 ft)

Population (30 April 2017)
  - Total: 1,918
  - Density: 143/km^{2} (371/sq mi)
- Demonym: Acutini
- Time zone: UTC+1 (CET)
  - Summer (DST): UTC+2 (CEST)
- Postal code: 03010
- Dialing code: 0775
- Patron saint: St. Maurice
- Website: Official website

Acuto (local dialect: Aùto) is a comune (municipality) in the Province of Frosinone in the Italian region Lazio, located about 60 kilometres (37 mi) east of Rome and about 20 kilometres (12 mi) northwest of Frosinone on a ridge of the Monti Ernici.

Acuto borders the following municipalities: Anagni, Ferentino, Fiuggi, Piglio.

== People ==
- Umberto Guidoni, politician and astronaut
- St. Maria de Mattias; founded in Acuto the Adorers of the Blood of Christ Catholic Sisters
