= Flavio Baracchini =

Italian World War I flying ace

Flavio Torello Baracchini
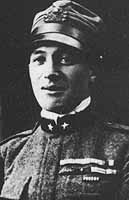
- Baracchini in 1918
- Born: 28 July 1895; Villafranca in Lunigiana, Kingdom of Italy
- Died: 18 August 1928 (aged 33); Rome, Kingdom of Italy
- Military career
- Allegiance: Kingdom of Italy
- Branch: Corpo Aeronautico Militare
- Service years: c. 1915–1918
- Rank: Tenente (Lieutenant)
- Units: 7a Squadriglia/26a Squadriglia, 81a Squadriglia, 76a Squadriglia
- Awards: Gold Medal of Military Valor
- Other work: Died while developing munitions for aviators

Flavio Torello Baracchini (Italian pronunciation: [ˈflaːvjo barakˈkiːni]; 28 July 1895 – 18 August 1928) was an Italian World War I fighter ace credited with 21 confirmed and nine unconfirmed aerial victories. His confirmed victory total ranked him fourth among Italian aces of the war.

After the war he worked as an inventor, working in the areas of aviation communications and explosives. He died in 1928 as a result of injuries that he received during an accident in his laboratory.

== Military career ==
Flavio Baracchini was born in Villafranca in Lunigiana on 28 July 1895. He was educated at technical schools in La Spezia. As World War I heated up, he was assigned to the Italian Army's 3rd Engineer Battalion. However, in Autumn 1915, he reported to the SIT School in Turin for pilot training. He was awarded licenses on 15 October and 1 December 1915; he then qualified on Voisins on 27 January 1916. On 28 February 1916, he was posted to 7a Squadriglia (later redesignated 26a Squadriglia) and piloted a Voisin for them until 20 November 1916. In December 1916, he was commissioned as a Sottotenente. He also reported to Cascina Costa to train on Nieuport fighters.

However, Baracchini had no success as a fighter pilot until May 1917, when he was assigned to the newly formed 81a Squadriglia. His claim of the 15th went unconfirmed, but he got his first victory five days later when he shot down an Albatros south of Marco. He scored again on the 23rd and 25th. He scored once more, on 6 June 1917, while flying a Nieuport 11, before upgrading to a Nieuport 17. He used his new plane to tally four more triumphs that month. By the 22nd, he had scored eight victories by fighting 35 times in 39 days. For this extraordinary display of prowess, Flavio Baracchini became the first Italian fighter pilot to win the Gold Medal for Military Valor.

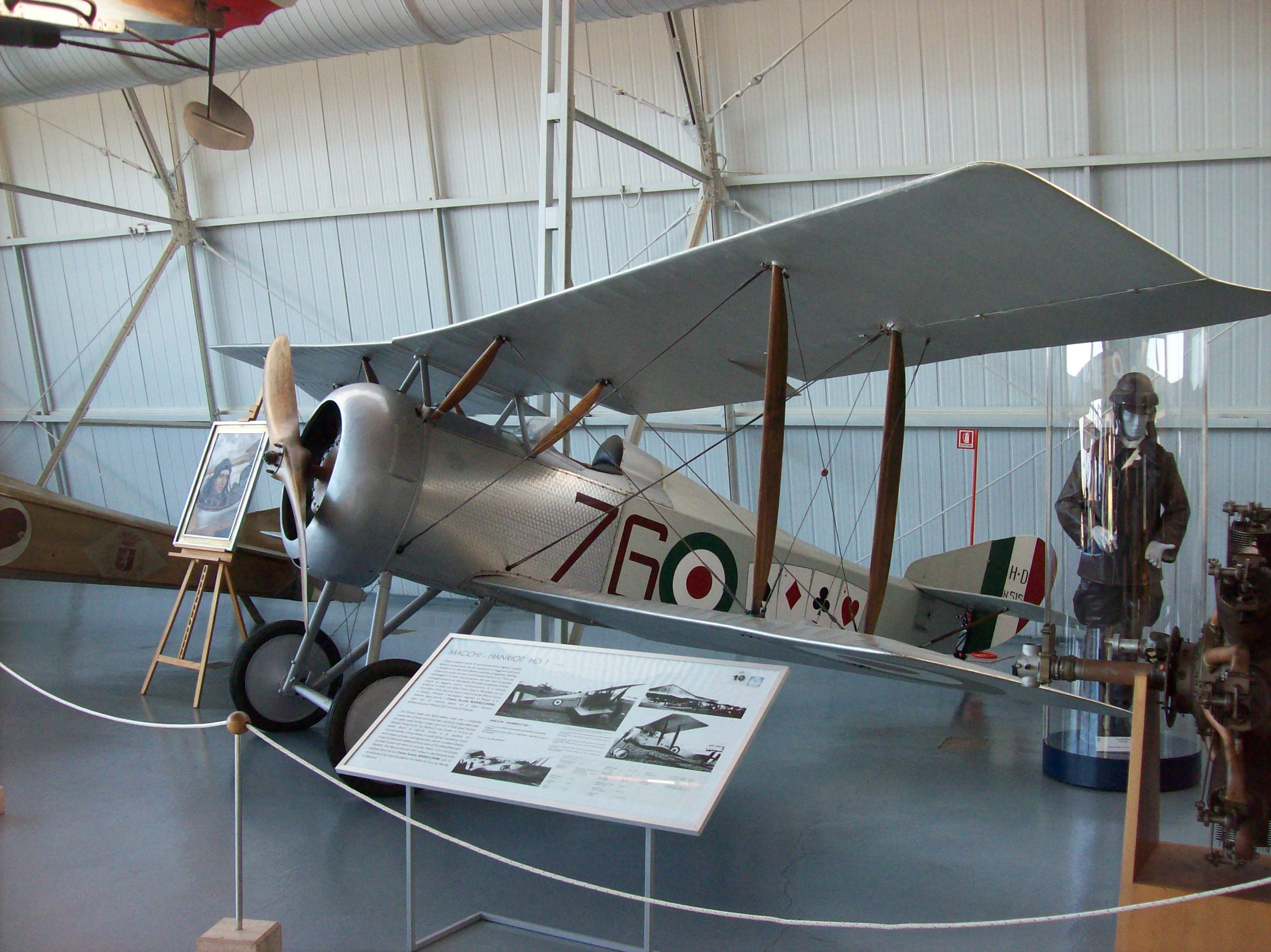
The Hanriot HD. 1 operated by Baracchini, on display at the Italian Air Force Museum near to Bracciano, Rome

He transferred to 76a Squadriglia and a Hanriot HD.1 on 14 July 1917. He also evaluated a loaner Spad VII for possible use by the squadron; it was rejected.

Baracchini won twice in July. In August, he was credited with two more victories, on the 3rd and 8th, while his first claim for an observation balloon went unconfirmed. He was so seriously wounded in the left jaw on 8 August 1917 that he was out of action for nine months.

Upon his return, he again had an unconfirmed credit on a balloon, on 3 April 1918. Then he was transferred back to 81a Squadriglia. He had four confirmed and four unconfirmed wins for May.

He began his final month of combat with a double victory on 15 June, with a third claim going unconfirmed. On the 18th, he once again was denied credit for downing a balloon. On the 21st, he finally became a balloon buster, for his nineteenth credit. He scored again on both the 22nd and the 25th, to bring his total to 21 confirmed and nine unconfirmed. However, on the 25th, he was again severely wounded, when he was shot down by machine gun fire.

== Post-war life ==
He survived the war, and quit flying in 1921. He turned to inventing items that would be useful to fliers. His first invention was a signalling device for communicating with aeroplanes, which was adopted by Italian aviators. He then began the development of an explosive mixture in a laboratory. It ignited accidentally and burned him severely on 29 July 1928. He lingered a short while, before succumbing on 18 August 1928.

== Sources ==
- Franks, Norman; Guest, Russell; Alegi, Gregory. Above the War Fronts: The British Two-seater Bomber Pilot and Observer Aces, the British Two-seater Fighter Observer Aces, and the Belgian, Italian, Austro-Hungarian and Russian Fighter Aces, 1914–1918: Volume 4 of Fighting Airmen of WWI Series: Volume 4 of Air Aces of WWI. Grub Street, 1997. ISBN 1-898697-56-6, ISBN 978-1-898697-56-5.
- Franks, Norman. Nieuport Aces of World War 1. Osprey Publishing, 2000. ISBN 1-85532-961-1, ISBN 978-1-85532-961-4.
- Guttman, John (2001). Spad VII Aces of World War I. Osprey Publishing. ISBN 978-1-84176-222-7.
