= Al-Jalah Hospital =

Al-Jalah HospitalAl-Jalah Hospital

Geography
- Location: Benghazi, Libya
- Coordinates: 32.1101°N 20.0902°E

Organisation
- Type: General

Services
- Beds: 200

Links
- Lists: Hospitals in Libya

Al-Jalah Hospital is a hospital in Benghazi, Libya. The hospital treated the wounded of the Libyan Civil War.
