= 81a Squadriglia =

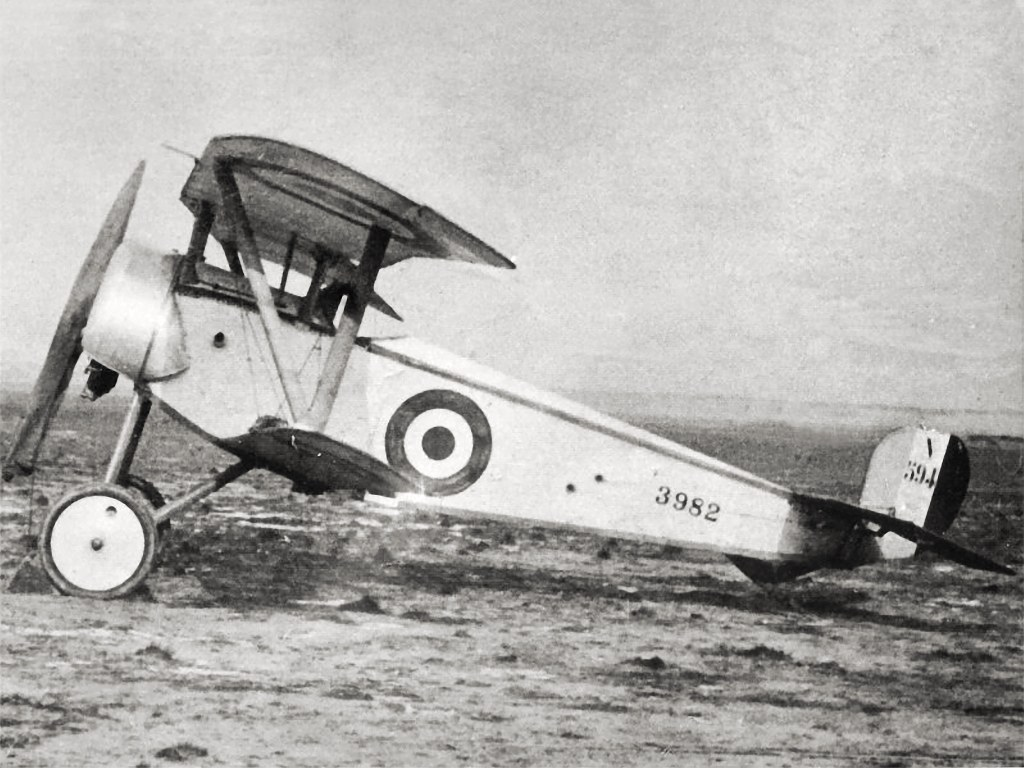
- Nieuport 11
- Active: Founded March 1917
- Country: Kingdom of Italy
- Branch: Corpo Aeronautico Militare
- Type: Fighter squadron
- Engagements: World War I

Aircraft flown
- Fighter: Nieuport 11; Nieuport 17; Hanriot HD.1; Nieuport 27

81a Squadriglia was an Italian fighter squadron raised in March 1917 that served through the end of World War I. One of its aces, Flavio Baracchini, would become the first awardee of the Gold Medal for Military Valor. The squadron would be credited with 34 aerial victories, and suffer four dead. It ended the war with 28 aircraft on strength.

== History ==
81a Squadriglia of the Corpo Aeronautico Militare was founded at the Central Flying School in Arcade, Italy in March 1917, during World War I. In April 1917, it deployed to operate Nieuport 11 fighters, and was attached to 2o Gruppo. The new unit flew its first combat sorties on 23 April 1917 and fought its first fight the following day. On 1 May 1917, Sergente Enrico Sorrentino scored the fledgling squadron's first aerial victory. In July, Flavio Baracchini became the first Italian fighter pilot to win the Gold Medal for Military Valor. The squadron re-equipped with Nieuport 17s.

The squadron was one of those displaced in the wake of the Italian defeat at the Battle of Caporetto. It bounced about four airfields in the last week of October as it repeatedly relocated. To add to the confusion, its commanding officer, Mario Zoboli, had orders transferring him out of the squadron's command on 1 November 1917. On 6 November, he returned when the orders were rescinded. Three days later, the squadron relocated once more, to join 6o Gruppo at Istrana. The move would put them in position for the great air battle over their base on 26 December 1917.

In February 1918, the squadron began replacing its Nieuport 17s with Hanriot HD.1s. Hanriot supplies being insufficient, some Nieuport 27s were also brought on strength. The squadron served on through Summer 1918. Then, on 26 October 1918, it was included in the Massa da Caccia (Fighter Mass) that supported the victorious final Italian offensive at Vittorio Veneto. When the war in northern Italy ended on 3 November 1918, the 81a Squadriglia had flown 4,118 combat sorties, engaged the enemy 230 times, and were credited with 34 aerial victories. The squadron suffered four dead. It still had 21 Hanriots and a Nieuport 27 in service.

== Commanding officers ==
- Capitano Salvatore Calori: March 1917 - 24 June 1917
- Capitano Mario Zoboli: 24 June 1917 - 25 March 1918 (see above)
- Capitano Renato Mazzucco: 25 March 1918 through war's end

== Duty stations ==
- Arcade, Italy: March 1917
- Borgnano: April 1917
- Aviano: 26 October 1917
- Bassano: 27 October 1917
- Arcade: 31 October 1917
- Istrana: 9 November 1917
- Isolo di Carturo: 2 February 1918
- Casoni: 17 February 1918

== Notable members ==
Flying ace Flavio Baracchini scored 13 of his 21 accredited victories with 81a Squadriglia. Other aces who scored victories while with the squadron were Gastone Novelli and Alessandro Buzio.

== Aircraft ==
- Nieuport 11
- Nieuport 17
- Hanriot HD.1
- Nieuport 27
