= Tommaso Casoni =

Italian physician

Tomaso Casoni.

Tommaso Casoni (1880–1933) was an Italian physician remembered for describing the Casoni test for the diagnosis of hydatid disease.

== Biography ==
Tommaso Casoni was born on 27 August 1880 in Imola. He studied at the Liceo Torricelli College of Faenza and the University of Bologna, gaining his M.D. in 1906. In 1910 he moved to Sardinia to research hydatid disease, leading to the publication of his eponymous test. He subsequently moved to Tripoli to the new hospital, L’Ospedale Coloniale Vittorio Eumanuele III. He remained there as chief medical officer for 20 years. He died in Imola on 6 September 1933 of kidney disease at the age of 53.
