= Casoni test =

Skin test used in the diagnosis of hydatid disease

- Purpose: diagnosis of hydatid disease

The Casoni test is a skin test used in the diagnosis of hydatid disease. The test involves the intradermal injection of 0.25 ml of sterilised fluid from hydatid cysts/human cyst and sterilised by Seitz filtration into one forearm, with an equal volume of saline injected into the other forearm. Observations are made over the next 30 minutes and after 1 to 2 days. A wheal response occurring at the injection site within 20 minutes is considered positive (immediate hypersensitivity). Delayed hypersensitivity reactions usually read after 18–24 hours. The test is positive in about 90% of cases of hydatid disease affecting the liver, but positive in less than 50% of patients with hydatid disease elsewhere in the body; false positive results are also common. Being a type I hypersensitivity reaction, anaphylactic reaction tray must be kept ready before carrying out the test. Consequently, serological tests are now generally used. The test was described in 1912 by Tomaso Casoni.
