= Silvio Scaroni =

Italian flying ace

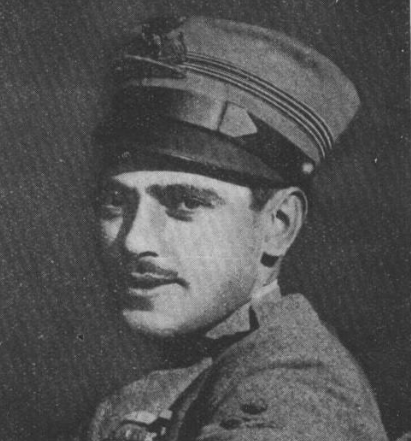
- Born: 12 May 1893; Brescia, Italy
- Died: 16 February 1977 (aged 83); Milan, Italy
- Military career
- Allegiance: Italian Empire
- Branch: Field Artillery, Air Service
- Rank: Tenente
- Units: 2nd Field Artillery Regiment, Squadriglias 4a, 43a, 44a, 86a, 76a
- Awards: Gold Medal of Military Valor; 2 Silver Medal of Military Valor, Bronze Medal of Military Valor

Tenente Silvio Scaroni (12 May 1893 – 16 February 1977) was an Italian World War I fighter pilot credited with 26 victories. He was the second ranking Italian ace of the war.

== Early service ==
Silvio Scaroni joined the 2nd Field Artillery Regiment of the Italian Army as a corporal. He was serving with that unit when World War I avalanched through the rest of Europe. On 2 August 1914, Italy announced its neutrality as sides formed up for the conflict.

== Aerial reconnaissance service ==
Scaroni transferred to the Corpo Aeronautico Militare in March 1915. He began training to fly Bleriots and Caudrons shortly before Italy entered the war on the side of the Triple Entente on 26 April 1915. In September 1915, Scaroni was assigned as a reconnaissance pilot with Squadriglia 4a. In January 1917, he was promoted to first lieutenant and assigned to Squadriglia 43a. Subsequently, he was reassigned to Squadriglia 86a, then to Squadriglia 76a as a fighter pilot.

== Service as a fighter pilot ==
On 3 November 1917, Scaroni filed his first claim for an aerial victory, but it went unconfirmed and uncredited. On 14 November, Scaroni scored his first official victory, while flying a Nieuport 17. By 19 December, he had scored six victories, and his squadron phased out the Nieuports.

For the remainder of his victories, Scaroni would fly a Hanriot HD.1. His 25 victories would make him second only to Belgium's Willy Coppens for success with this type of airplane.

His success with the Hanriot began only four days later, as he scored victory number two on the 18th. A win the following day, and one each on 5 and 10 December made him an ace in less than a month. He scored once more on 19 December. Then, the day after Christmas, he was the leading gun in one of the most lopsided aerial battles in World War I.

As he himself described it in a magazine article he penned for Nel Cielo, his airfield was attacked by ten enemy bombers. He shot down one of the bombers in flames at 9 AM. He then dueled with another for twenty minutes before it crashed. The observer leapt from the wreckage and lit it on fire to deny its capture. Unfortunately, the observer managed to catch his own clothing on fire in the process. Still more unfortunately, the pilot was still pinned under the debris and burned to death. Meanwhile, Scaroni's squadron-mates shot down six more of the raiders. Scaroni capped off the day by downing another, even larger, bomber at 12:35. He thus ended the year with nine wins.

He accumulated another ten victories by 16 June 1918. On that day, or the next, he doubled his firepower by installing a second machine gun on his plane.

He scored four more times in June, including a double on the 25 July saw him with two confirmed victories and two unconfirmed on the 7th, and a confirmed and an unconfirmed on the 12th. He was wounded the following day, and saw no further combat in the war.

== Later life ==
Scaroni attended the Schneider Trophy air races in November, 1926 as part of his duties as Italy's Air Attache to the United States. The race was held just outside Washington, D.C., in the Chesapeake Bay. Italy had a racing team entered; they had come with such expectation of victory that they had smuggled celebratory Chianti in their seaplane floats in violation of America's Prohibition. When they had engine problems, Scaroni suggested switching American spark plugs and gasoline into the Italian planes. That solved their engine woes.

Italy sent a military mission to aid the Nationalist Chinese government in 1933. Circa 1934, as part of this mission to China, Colonel Scaroni established a flying school for the Chinese Air Force at Luoyang. Its policy was to graduate every pupil. This was done to ingratiate the Italians to the ruling class parents of the flying cadets, and to undercut the popularity of a previously established flying school at Hangzhou, which was staffed and run by Americans to stricter United States Army Air Corps standards. The mission would remain in China until 1936. Scaroni would serve there through 1937.

The Italian mission also set up an aircraft manufactory to produce Fiat fighters and Savoia-Marchetti bombers under license.

During World War II, Scaroni commanded the Italian air forces in Sicily.

== Writings by Scaroni ==
Scaroni published his memoirs as Impressions and Memories of Aerial Warfare, as noted below.

- Impressioni e ricordi di guerra aerea. Silvio Scaroni. Danesi, 1922.
- Battaglie nel cielo; con 30 illustrazioni e una carta fuori testo.: con 30 illustrazioni e una carta fuori testo. Silvio Scaroni. A. Mondadori, 1934.
- Con Vittorio Emanuele III. Silvio Scaroni, King of Italy Victor Emmanuel, Victor Emmanuel. A. Mondadori, 1954.
- Missione militare aeronautica in Cina. Silvio Scaroni. Ufficio Storico Aeronautica Militare, 1970.
