= 80a Squadriglia =

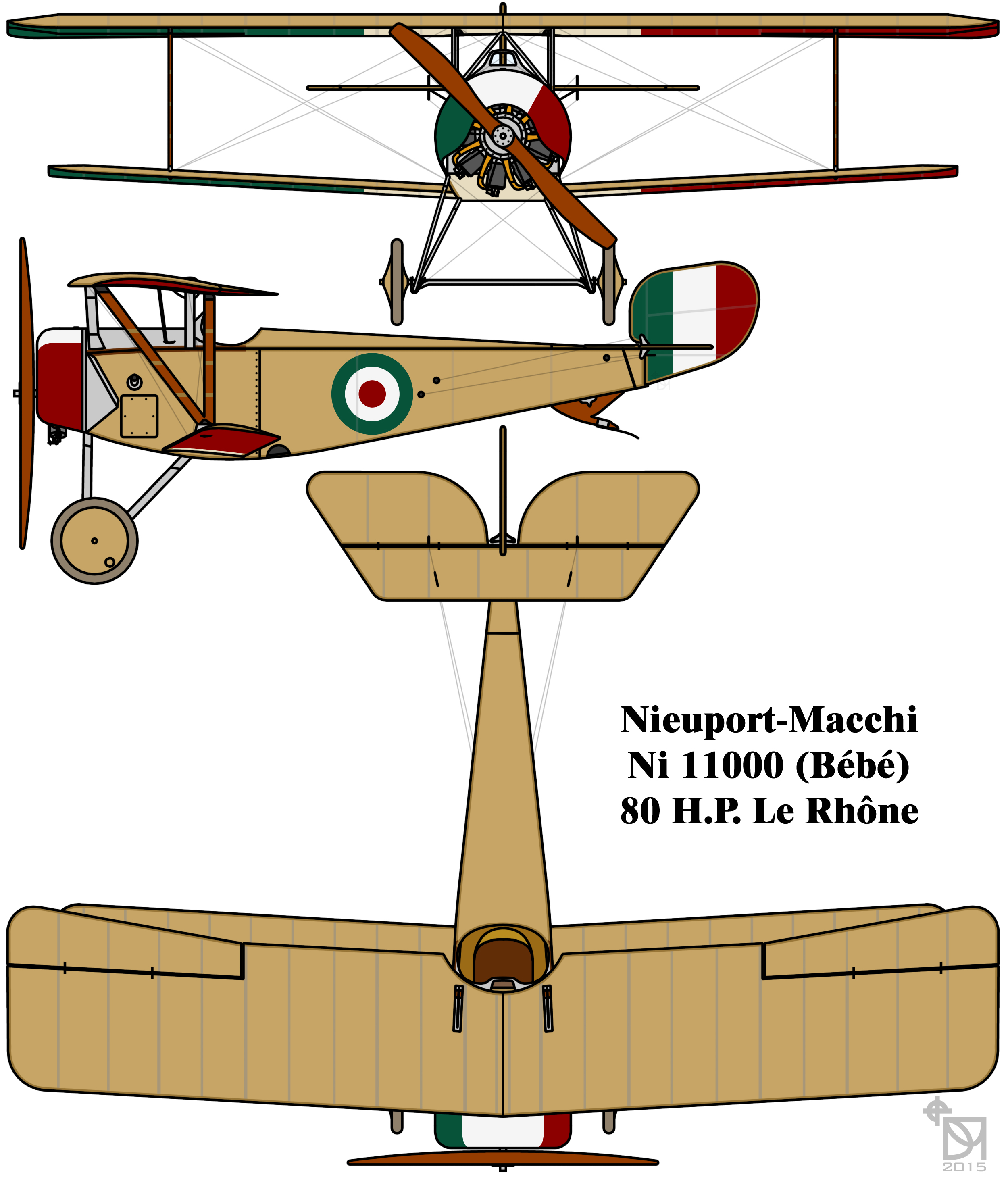
- Nieuport 11
- Active: Founded February 1917
- Country: Kingdom of Italy
- Branch: Corpo Aeronautico Militare
- Type: Fighter squadron
- Engagements: World War I

Aircraft flown
- Fighter: Nieuport 11; Hanriot HD.1

80a Squadriglia was an Italian fighter squadron founded in 1917 to serve in support of the Battles of the Isonzo in northern Italy. By war's end, it had been credited with 21 aerial victories without suffering any of its own personnel casualties.

== History ==
80a Squadriglia of the Corpo Aeronautico Militare was founded in February 1917 at the Arcade, Italy Central Flying School. It was assigned to 1o Gruppo on 28 February, with a strength of five pilots and five aircraft. By 10 March 1917, it had bulked up to ten Nieuport 11s on strength.

On 15 March 1917, it flew its first combat sorties. The squadron's first combat victory was scored on 24 April 1917. Six days later, it began six months of operations from a base at Aiello del Friuli. It would be dislodged from there as a result of the Battle of Caporetto. On 27 October 1917, the squadron set fire to five aircraft it was forced to abandon, and evacuated to La Comina. It would eventually settle into Marcon on 10 November 1917.

The squadron would upgrade to Hanriot HD.1s in 1918. They would fight on until war's end. Their wartime record tallied 4,637 combat sorties, 167 aerial battles, and 21 accredited victories. They suffered no casualties.

== Commanding officers ==
- Capitano Mario Gordesco: February 1917 - promoted out ca. 1 November 1917
- Capitano Raoul Da Barberino: ca. 1 November 1917 - ca. 7 November 1917 (injured)
- Tenente Guido Sambonet: ca. 7 November 1917
- Tenente Georgio Zoli: 6 February 1917 - 30 April 1917
- Capitano Umberto Gelmeti: 30 April 1917 - 7 June 1917
- Capitano Achille Pierro: 7 June 1917 through war's end

== Duty stations ==
- Arcade Central Flying School: February 1917
- Santa Maria la Longa: ca. 28 February 1917
- Aiello: 30 April 1918
- La Comina: 27 October 1917
- Arcade: 1 November 1917
- Marcon: 10 November 1917

== Notable members ==
Alvaro Leonardi scored all eight of his victories with the squadron. Other aces who served in the squadron and scored victories included Michele Allasia, Giovanni Ancillotto, and Ernesto Cabruna.

== Aircraft ==
The actual colors of the squadron markings depended on an aircraft's basic color. However, the squadron insignia was typically a red star superimposed on a white circle within a black border.

- Nieuport 11
- Hanriot
