= Ernesto Cabruna =

- Born: 2 June 1889; Tortona, Kingdom of Italy
- Died: 9 January 1960 (aged 70)
- Burial place: Gabrielle D'Annunzio's Vittoriale estate
- Military career
- Allegiance: Italy
- Branch: Corpo Aeronautico Militare
- Service years: 1907–1932
- Rank: Capitano
- Units: Carabinieri Reali; 28a Squadriglia; 80a Squadriglia; 77a Squadriglia; 39a Squadriglia
- Awards: One Bronze, one Silver, and one Gold award to the Medal for Military Valor
- Other work: Aide de camp for Italy's Aviation Chief of Staff

Capitano Ernesto Cabruna (2 June 1889 – 9 January 1960) was an Italian professional soldier who became a World War I flying ace credited with eight aerial victories. He served in Italy's military police, beginning in 1907. After service in Libya and Rhodes, he received a Bronze Medal for Military Valor a year after Italy's involvement in World War I began. He turned to aviation, became a pilot, and as such earned his first Silver Medal for Military Valor at the end of 1917.

In 1918, Cabruna twice singlehandedly attacked swarms of enemy aircraft, winning victories both times. He was also raised into the officers' ranks. On 26 September 1918, he broke his clavicle. Two days later, he forced his way back to flying to participate in the Battle of Vittorio Veneto. He claimed his final two aerial victories on 25 October. The day before the Austro-Hungarian surrender, 2 November 1918, Cabruna strafed two of their airplanes parked on their own airfield. He then won a Gold award of the Medal for Military Valor.

Cabruna remained in military service postwar, serving as Aide de Camp to the Aviation Chief of Staff. He became an intimate of proto-fascist poet Gabrielle D'Annunzio. He left the military on 2 June 1932, having served his nation a quarter of a century. When he died on 9 January 1960, he was interred on D'Annunzio's estate. His Spad VII fighter plane is enshrined in the Italian Air Force Museum.

== Early life and service ==
Ernesto Cabruna was born on 2 June 1889 in Tortona, the Kingdom of Italy. His family were merchants. Young Cabruna attended technical school until, on 18 October 1907, he joined the Carabinieri Reali, Italy's version of military police. The following year, he performed commendably during the 1908 Messina earthquake. On 30 September 1911, he was promoted to Vice Brigadiere. From April 1912 to May 1913, he was posted to Tripolitania, Libya. He later took part in the occupation of Rhodes.

== World War I ==
On 31 January 1915, Cabruna was promoted to Brigadier. In October 1915, he was posted to the 10th Company of the Turin and Allievi (Cadets) Legion. On 15 May 1916, while stationed near Asiago, he rescued victims of an Austro-Hungarian bombing raid while under fire. His valor was rewarded with a Bronze Medal for Military Valor. In July 1916, Cabruna reported to Turin for pilot's training. He was granted two licenses for the Maurice Farman 14, awarded on 6 October and 16 November 1916. He was posted to 29a Squadriglia on 28 December 1916. He would fly reconnaissance missions while so assigned.

Ernesto Cabruna flew his first combat sortie on 2 January 1917. On 31 May 1917, he was promoted to Maresciallo. After completing training on Nieuport fighters, he was assigned to a fighter squadron, 84a Squadriglia. On 21 September 1917, he was transferred to another fighter squadron, 80a Squadriglia. He scored his first aerial victory on 26 October, and another on 5 December. By the end of 1917, Cabruna merited a Silver award of the Medal for Military Valor.

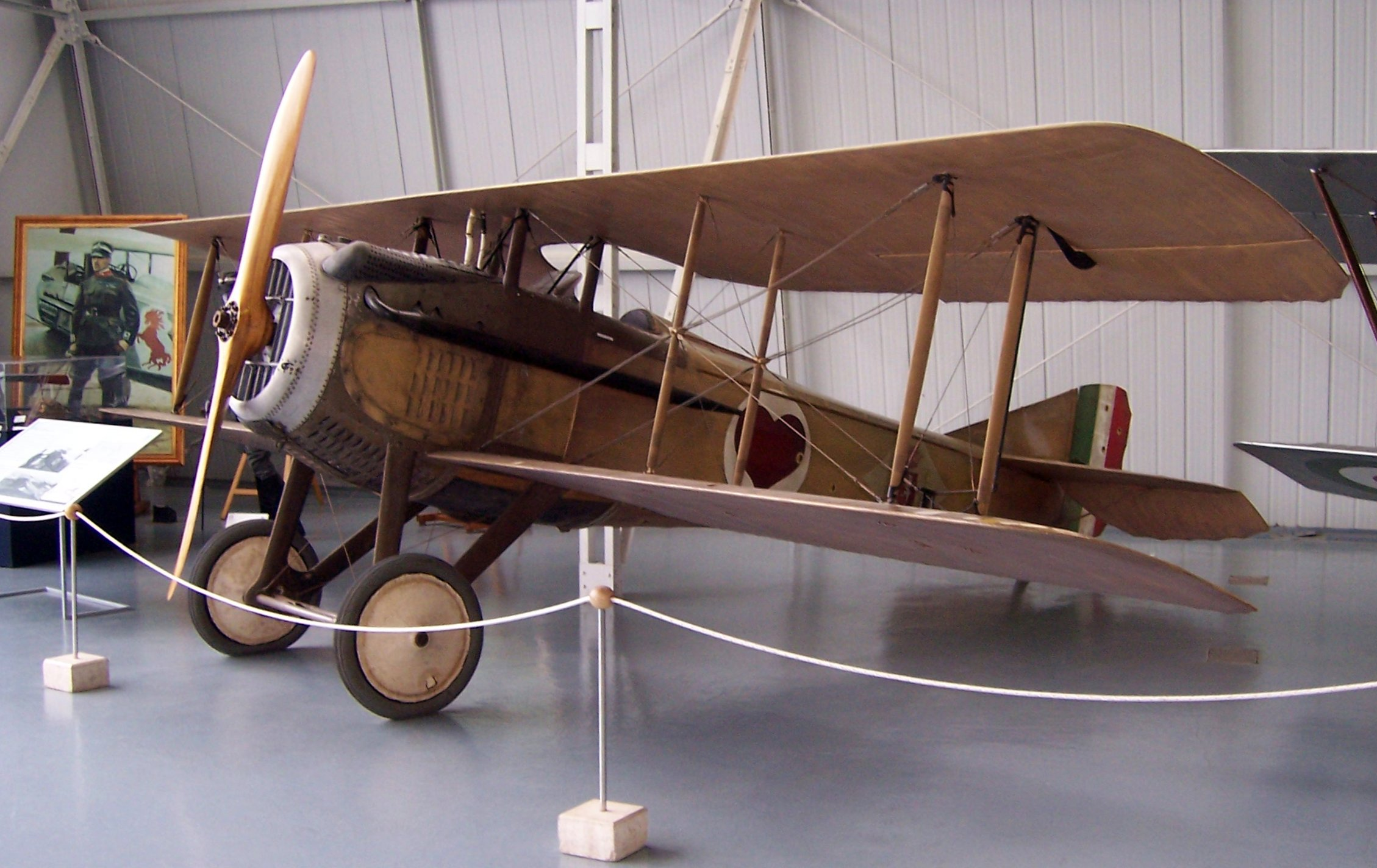
Restoration of the Spad VII that Ernesto Cabruna flew. It bears 77a Squadriglia insignia, as well as Cabruna's personal markings.

On 26 January 1918, he was transferred to another fighter squadron, 77a Squadriglia. Their squadron symbol was a red heart on a while circle; aft of this, Cabruna appended the coat of arms of his native city of Tortona.

He would score a victory for his new squadron on 12 March 1918. On 29 March 1918, he broke away from a unit patrol and singlehanded attacked 11 enemy aircraft. Cabruna fired several bursts of machine gun fire into a red fighter, which exited in an abrupt dive. This daring feat was featured on the cover of a leading Italian magazine, Domenica del Corriere; the illustration was by Achille Beltrame. Although existing Austro-Hungarian aviation loss files fail to support it, Cabruna was credited with the victory.

On 4 April 1918, he was commissioned into the officers' ranks in a battlefield promotion. On 15 June 1918, the swarm of enemy planes numbered 30, but Cabruna again plunged into solo combat and downed his fifth victim to become an ace.

Cabruna shot down two more enemies in June, before hitting a dry spell. On 26 September 1918, he crashed an Ansaldo A.1 Balilla in a landing accident, breaking his collarbone. The new fighter had broken an oil line; spurting oil blinded Cabruna, and he was fortunate to survive the crashlanding.

He was sidelined two days, then returned to flight duty for Italy's final offensive, the Battle of Vittorio Veneto. He claimed to have shot down two enemy aircraft on 25 October for his final aerial victories. On 2 November 1918, he strafed two enemy airplanes on the airfield at Aiello and destroyed them. The next day, the Austro-Hungarians surrendered. Cabruna would be awarded the Gold Medal for Military Valor for these latter day exploits.

== Post-World War I ==
The Bongiovanni commission report of 1 February 1919 confirmed eight of the nine victories that had been symbolized on Cabruna's Spad VII. He was credited with victories over seven enemy airplanes and an observation balloon. In April 1919, he was promoted to Sottotenente. He was also posted to 39a Squadriglia, where he became a familiar of Gabrielle D'Annunzio. Cabruna joined in D'Annunzio's short-lived revolt against the Italian government. When this ended, the ace was unemployed and penniless.

Cabruna re-entered service. In December 1923, he transferred from the Carabineri to the Regia Aeronautica. He returned briefly to Libya. In 1925, he was promoted to Capitano. He was assigned as Aide de Camp for the Aviation Chief of Staff. However, his career apparently floundered, and he was discharged on 2 June 1932 for ill health.

He became disgruntled with fascism after his departure from the military. During World War II, British military intelligence listed him as a member of the "Free Italy" organization, with the cover name of "X-19".

After World War II, Ernesto Cabruna chose life as a near-hermit. He died on 9 January 1960.

== Death and legacy ==
Ernesto Cabruna died in Rapallo on 9 January 1960. He is buried on the premises of D'Annunzio's Vittoriale mansion. Cabruna's original Spad VII fighter is now displayed in the Italian Air Force Museum.

== Honors and awards ==
- Gold Medal of Military Valor (awarded in exchange for a second Silver Medal of Military Valor obtained in 1918 with the following citation: "A most daring fighter pilot, with tenacious will and courage he did his tireless and wonderful work with zeal and enthusiasm.")

"Magnificent fighter ace of the air force, in the perfect execution of orders as well as in very daring initiatives, in battles sustained and won with incredible audacity even alone against an overwhelming number of feared and well-trained adversaries, often in a delicate state of health, he lavished in every circumstance of war his wonderful, tireless activity, with the temper of Roman heroism. In the last great offensive, in which he wanted to participate at all costs, leaving the hospital where he was recovering from a wound, despite having his right arm still immobile and in pain and therefore finding himself in conditions of absolute inferiority, with unparalleled tenacity of will and animosity, he attacked, at a distant airfield, various enemy aircraft ready to leave and he set two of them on fire. On another occasion he rushed into the middle of a group of thirty enemy aircraft, shooting down one and hindering the others from reaching their objective; for him the enemy's numerical superiority was an incentive to engage in combat. In the most varied and difficult circumstances, from the beginning to the end of the war, completing a total of over 900 hours of flight, without hesitating in the face of the most daring undertakings, he rendered great and notable services to his country. Aiello, October 1917; Sky over the Piave, June, July, November 1918."
— 24 May 1924

- Silver Medal of Military Valor

“A skilled and daring fighter pilot, he demonstrated, in all circumstances, admirable calm and cool-headedness by carrying out numerous important combat flights. On 14 November 1917, on escort duty, he was attacked by three enemy aircraft and engaged in combat, giving up only after the escorted aircraft had returned to our lines unharmed. On 26 October and 5 December 1917, after a lively fight, he shot down two opposing aircraft. Sky over the Karst Plateau and Piave, 14 November, 26 October, and 5 December 1917"

- Bronze Medal of Military Valor

"While enemy artillery bombarded a town, he waited to save the wounded, remaining on site to carry out the merciful work under the intense enemy fire. Asiago, 15 May 1916."

- War Merit Cross

"An aviator pilot officer of undisputed value, although in delicate health, he constantly demonstrated skill and audacity. In the last great offensive, his collarbone not yet healed, which limited the use of his right arm, he decided to leave the hospital and return to his squadron. And, during a risky reconnaissance of a distant enemy airfield, he managed to set two planes on fire, giving a good demonstration of courage and contempt for danger."
— Latisana–Aiello del Friuli 27 August–2 November 1918

- Commemorative Medal of the Fiume Expedition

"Today, on the eighth anniversary of the Ronchi march, I award the gold medal to my legionary Ernesto Cabruna, already my glorious wingmate of the III Army. He was the first aviator to arrive in Fiume, which I occupied. As my liaison officer, as my secret affairs officer, he rendered great service to the Cause. Obeying my well-defined orders, he remained in Fiume after the "Bloody Christmas." He represented me nobly and sagaciously in the negotiations for the evacuation of the port of Sauro. Finally he completed the undertaking that I had entrusted to him by leading the Action of 3 March 1922, as head of the Military Council, and thus seconding that annexation which will necessarily have to be extended to all the Bebie Alps and the Dinarics."
— Vittoriale, 12 September 1927, Gabriele d'Annunzio from Montenevoso

- Promotion for War Merit

"Having sighted and reached, alone, in the sky over Conegliano an enemy aircraft escorted by ten fighters, including three red ones, which are believed to be mounted by the best Austro-German "aces", he gave up on the crazy adventure of facing them there, which, however, he did as soon as he saw them determined to turn towards our territory, giving battle, always alone, to all eleven with sublime temerity, managing, thanks to very skillful maneuvers, to isolate the red 'patrol leader' and disrupt and disperse the remaining ten, who all fled one by one by gliding into their territory, definitively giving up carrying out reconnaissance or bombing."
— 4 April 1918

== Sources ==
- Franks, Norman; Guest, Russell; Alegi, Gregory. Above the War Fronts: The British Two-seater Bomber Pilot and Observer Aces, the British Two-seater Fighter Observer Aces, and the Belgian, Italian, Austro-Hungarian and Russian Fighter Aces, 1914–1918: Volume 4 of Fighting Airmen of WWI Series: Volume 4 of Air Aces of WWI. Grub Street, 1997. ISBN 1-898697-56-6, ISBN 978-1-898697-56-5.
- Guttman, Jon. SPAD VII Aces of World War 1. Osprey Publishing, 2001. ISBN 1841762229, 9781841762227.
- Varriale, Paolo. Italian Aces of World War 1. Osprey Pub Co, 2009. ISBN 978-1-84603-426-8.
