= Michele Allasia =

Michelle Allasia
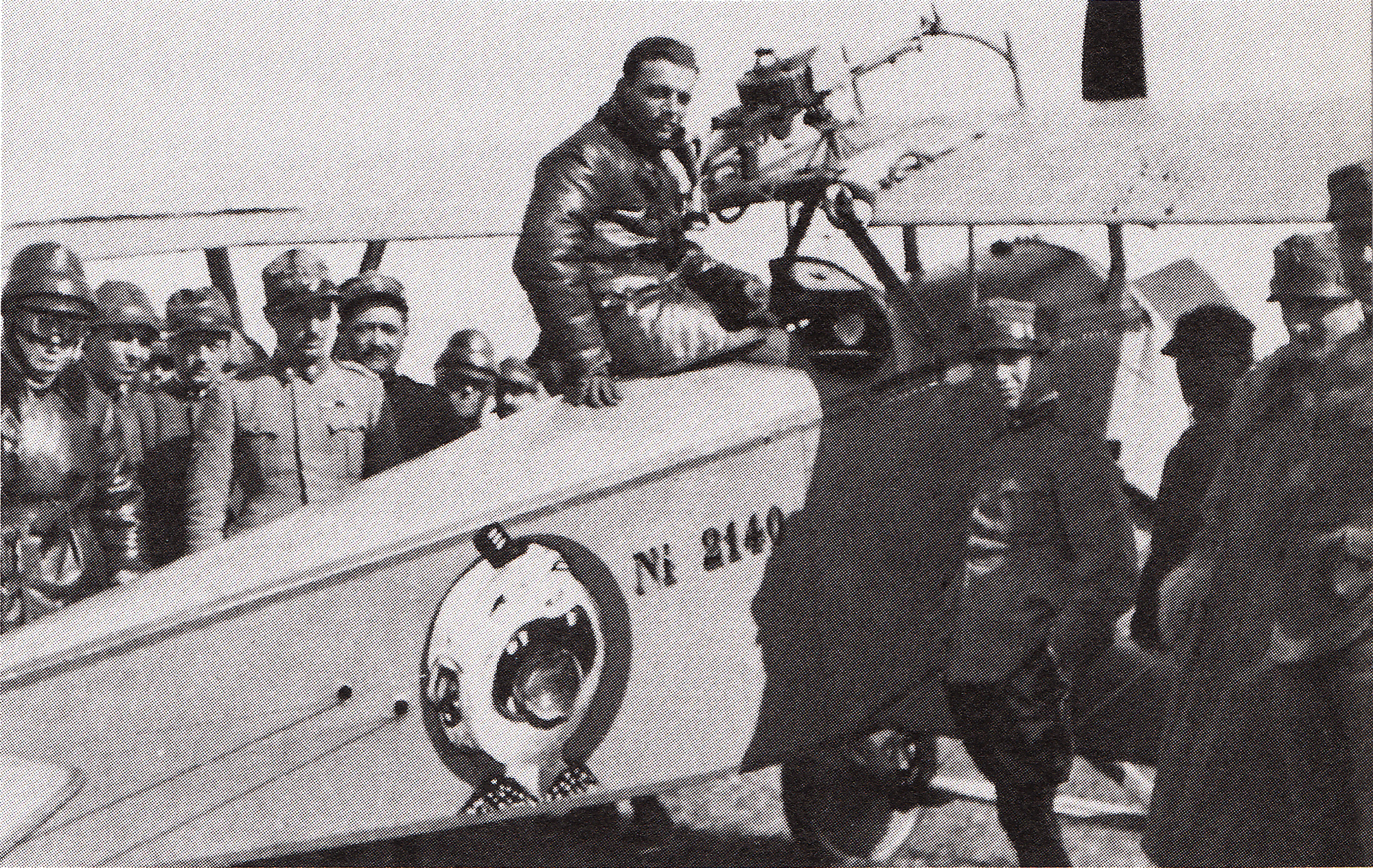
- Born: 24 June 1893; Ferrara, Italy
- Died: 20 July 1918 (aged 25)
- Military career
- Allegiance: Italy
- Branch: Flying service
- Rank: Sottotenente
- Units: 37a Squadriglia, 77a Squadriglia, 80a Squadriglia, 5a Sezione SVA
- Awards: Medal for Military Valor (1 bronze and 3 silver awards)

Sottotenente Michele Allasia was a World War I fighter ace credited with five aerial victories.

== Biography ==
Allasia was born on 24 June 1893, in Ferrara, Kingdom of Italy. Allasia was a lathe operator in civilian life. In 1913, he was accepted into the Battaglione Squadriglie Aviatori because of his skills with a lathe. When the war began, he enrolled in the Busto Arsizio flying school. In late May 1916, he received his pilot's license. He was assigned to fly a Farman for 37a Squadriglia, which was tasked with the defense of Bergamo. He flew 40 fruitless sorties there, before being selected for training on Nieuports.

Allasia was transferred to 80a Squadriglia on 9 March 1917. He returned to the Isonzo front with the rank of Sergente Maggiore. It was about this time that some of the squadron's pilots used Happy Hooligan as an insignia on their planes. Allasia's version showed Fortunello yelling wordlessly.

On 25 April 1917, he was granted the Bronze award of the Medal of Military Valor. On 27 April, in a letter home, Allasia depicted his previous day's (26 April) dogfight with three Austro-Hungarian machines: "If only you could see how badly holed my aircraft is! Four bullets grazed my back. Even the fuel tank was pierced." The following day, 28 April 1917, six weeks after his first dog fight, Allasia was rated as a qualified Nieuport 11 pilot. He was wounded by antiaircraft shrapnel on 10 May 1917. He landed for medical aid at Doberdò del Lago, and was unable to return to duty until early July.

Upon his return, he submitted a claim for shooting down a seaplane on 13 July, but it went unverified. The next month, he and Giovanni Sabelli teamed to shoot down a Hansa-Brandenburg C.I for Allasia's first win. On 1 September 1917, Prince Emanuele Filiberto, Duke of Aosta made a field award of the Silver Medal of Military Valor to Michele Allasia.

Allasia scored twice more while with 80a Squadriglia, on 2 and 7 November 1917. He had flown 368 combat hours with the squadron by the time he left. Allasia transferred to 77a Squadriglia later in November, to fly a Spad VII. However, he flew only 37 hours with the 77th, including some night flying experiments, but only one combat. On 12 December, Allasia received his second field award of the Silver Medal for Military Valor.

On 11 March 1918, Allasia engaged a formation of Austro-Hungarian fighters over Pordenone. His Spad took 18 hits from the guns of Benno Fiala Ritter von Fernbrugg, who claimed him as a victory. Nevertheless, the Italian escaped unscathed. On 8 June 1918, he transferred to the newly formed strategic reconnaissance unit, 5a Sezione SVA. A week later, he shot down a two-seater for his fourth triumph. On the 23rd, he shot down another enemy airplane. Allasia also received a third Silver Medal for Military Valor for his courageous actions from 15 through 23 June 1918.

On 20 July 1918, Allasia and his passenger, Capitano Giuseppe Graglia, crashed an Ansaldo SVA.9 near Marcon airfield. Both of them were trapped in the wreckage and burned to death.
