= 77a Squadriglia =

- Active: Founded 31 May 1916
- Country: Kingdom of Italy
- Branch: Corpo Aeronautico Militare
- Type: Fighter squadron
- Engagements: World War I

Aircraft flown
- Fighter: Nieuport 10; Nieuport 17; Spad VII

77a Squadriglia was one of the first Italian fighter squadrons. After its founding on 31 May 1916, it began flying combat in July 1916, and would operate until the end of World War I. It was one of the squadrons drawn into late 1917's Battle of Caporetto, and forced to retreat after the Italian defeat. By the time the Austro-Hungarians sued for peace, 77a Squadriglia could count some 50 aerial victories scored in about 250 victories.

== History ==
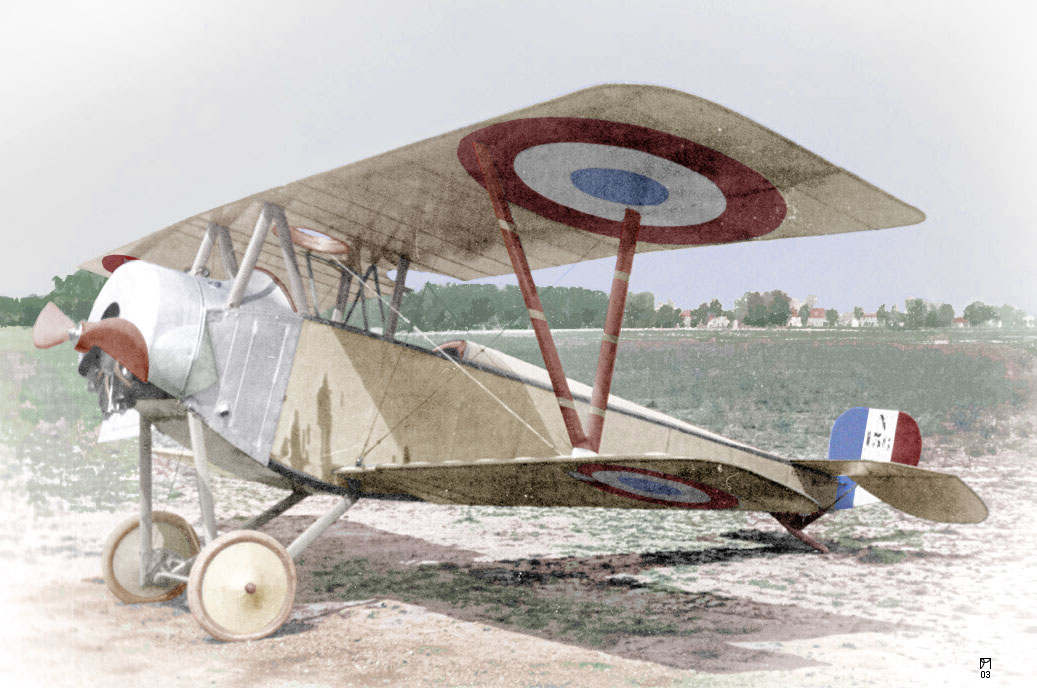
Nieuport 10

77a Squadriglia of the Corpo Aeronautico Militare was founded at La Comina on 31 May 1916. It was issued Nieuport 10 two-seaters and assigned to 3o Gruppo. The new squadron began flying combat operations in July 1916. After its move to Cascina Farello, on 14 November 1916 the squadron's airfield was bombed, killing two.

As the year turned, 77a Squadriglia was re-equipped with Nieuport 17 single-seat fighters. In March 1917, it began receiving Spad VIIs, which it emblazoned with the squadron symbol of a heart in a white circle. The unit was drawn into the northern frontier fighting at Caporetto. As a result of that Italian defeat, the squadron was forced to relocate rapidly three times. After coming to rest at Marcon, the squadron was attached as part of 13o Gruppo.

As the squadron's records have vanished, details of its later wartime service are scarce; one known notable feat was Italy's first night fighter victory on 24 July 1918, scored by Giovanni Ancillotto. However, when World War I did end, the squadron had flown more than 5,000 combat sorties, engaged its aerial enemies about 250 times, and been credited with 50 victories. Four of its pilots had become aces while within its ranks.

== Commanding officers ==
- Pier Ruggero Piccio: ca 30 May 1916 - 26 January 1917
- Ettore Croce: 26 January 1917
- Ferruccio Ranza
- Alberto Marazzani
- Filippo Serafini: August 1918

== Duty stations ==
- La Comina: from 25 May 1916
- Fossalunga: from June 1916
- Cascina Farello: from August 1916
- Aiello del Friuli: from March 1917
- La Comina: ca November 1917
- Arcade: ca November 1917
- Marcon: ca November–December 1917

== Notable members ==
- Pier Ruggero Piccio
- Giovanni Ancillotto
- Carlo Lombardi
- Ernesto Cabruna
- Cosimo Rizzotto
