= Kappa (brand) =

Italian sportswear brand

- Type: Private subsidiary
- Industry: Sports equipment Textile
- Founded: 1978; 48 years ago
- Founder: Marco Boglione
- Headquarters: Turin, Italy
- Area served: Worldwide
- Key people: Marco Boglione (President); Gianni Crispi (CEO)
- Products: Clothing; Footwear; Sportswear
- Revenue: €284 million (2019)
- Parent: BasicNet S.p.A.
- Website: kappa.com

Kappa is an Italian sportswear brand founded in Turin, Piedmont, Italy in 1978 by Marco Boglione, as a sportswear branch of the already existing "Robe di Kappa".

== History ==
Maglificio Calzificio Torinese (MCT) is a sock and underwear company from Turin established in 1916. It had a production problem with its Aquila brand in 1956. When the problem was fixed, all the new products were stamped with a K, standing for German Kontrolle. Sales surged and in 1967 the K line was formally called Kappa, the Greek letter for K.

The brand has been the shirt sponsor of many football teams in its history, including Juventus, AEK Athens FC, AC Milan, and Barcelona FC, and currently sponsors teams such as OGC Nice, Genoa FC, and Kaizer Chiefs F.C.

== See also ==
- Nordica
- Playlife
- Legea
- Tecnica
- Mudflap girl – other iconic reclining silhouette
