= Rollerblade =

Brand of inline skates

- Type: Private
- Industry: Sporting Goods
- Founded: Minnesota, incorporated 1982 as Ole's Innovative Sports
- Headquarters: West Lebanon, New Hampshire
- Area served: Worldwide
- Key people: Rollerblade USA; Jeremy Stonier (Co-President); Stephen Charrier (Co-President); Pamela Kidder (CFO)
- Revenue: ▲ ~US$ $20 million (2008)
- Number of employees: 27 (2008)
- Parent: Tecnica Group
- Website: rollerblade.com

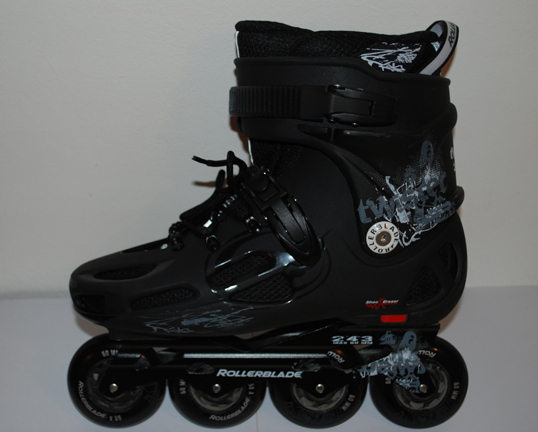
A Rollerblade Twister skate (c.2012)

Rollerblade is a brand of inline skates owned by Nordica, part of the Tecnica Group of Giavera del Montello, Treviso, Italy.

The company started as Ole's Innovative Sports, created by Scott Olson in Minneapolis, and operated in his family basement and employed his brothers, chiefly Brennan Olson. The company eventually became Rollerblade, Inc. The company changed hands over time between Nordica, Benetton Group and Tecnica.

Inline-skates had been used for many years by ice speed skaters before they became mainstream. For the first few years after Rollerblade was developed, Rollerblade, Inc. were the only manufacturer of in-line skates that had worldwide distribution. This allowed the company to capitalize and grab a huge percentage of the world market share and almost total dominance of the North American market with aggressive advertising campaigns and sponsored in-line-only sporting events. The term "rollerblades" has become a generic trademark for inline skates in general.

Rollerblade, Inc. manufactures different types of skates, such as those for aggressive skating (aimed at jumps, tricks, and use at skate parks), fitness, or recreational use with removable "walkable" liners, as well as adjustable skates for younger users.
