= Fred Wheeler =

English footballer

Personal information
- Birth name: Frederick William Wheeler
- Date of birth: January 1888
- Place of birth: Reading, England
- Date of death: 2 January 1918 (aged 30)
- Place of death: Montello sector, Italy
- Position: Inside left

Senior career*
Years	Team	Apps	(Gls)
- Colne
1910–1911	Southampton	3	(0)
1911	Eastleigh Athletic		
1911	Woolston		
- * Club domestic league appearances and goals

Frederick William Wheeler (January 1888 – 2 January 1918) was an English professional footballer who played as an inside forward in the Southern Football League for Southampton.

== Personal life ==
Wheeler worked as an insurance agent. He served as a sapper in the Royal Engineers during the First World War and was involved in the Italian campaign, being killed in the Montello sector on 2 January 1918. He is buried at Giavera British Cemetery, Arcade.

== Career statistics ==
Appearances and goals by club, season and competition
Club	Season	League			FA Cup		Total	
Club	Season	Division	Apps	Goals	Apps	Goals	Apps	Goals
Southampton	1910–11	Southern League First Division	3	0	0	0	3	0
Career total			3	0	0	0	3	0
