= Giovanni Ancillotto =

Italian World War I flying ace

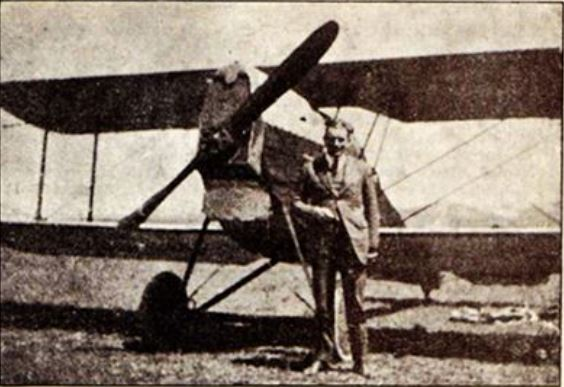
- Ancillotto in front of his Ansaldo A.1 Balilla on 2 May 1921
- Born: 15 November 1896; San Donà di Piave, Kingdom of Italy
- Died: 18 October 1924 (aged 27); Caravaggio, Lombardy, Kingdom of Italy
- Military career
- Branch: Corpo Aeronautico Militare
- Service years: 1915–1918
- Rank: Tenente
- Nickname: Giannini
- Units: 114a Squadriglia; 27a Squadriglia; 30a Squadriglia; 80a Squadriglia; 77a Squadriglia
- Conflicts: Battle of Caporetto
- Awards: One Gold and three Silver awards of the Medal for Military Valor
- Other work: Flew across Peru's Andes Mountains in May 1921

Lieutenant Giovanni 'Giannino' Ancillotto (15 November 1896 – 18 October 1924) was an Italian World War I flying ace credited with 11 confirmed aerial victories. Rather unusually, he served solely with aviation while he was in the military, beginning in the lowest rank. Among his aerial victories as a fighter pilot were three over enemy observation balloons right after the Battle of Caporetto. As an example of the hazards of balloon busting, on 5 December 1917 Ancillotto returned to base with singed swatches of the third balloon's fabric adhering to his damaged fighter plane.

Having survived the war as a Tenente with one Gold and three Silver awards of the Medal for Military Valor, Ancillotto flew a civil aircraft nonstop from Rome to Warsaw on 11 September 1919. In May 1921, he transited the Andes Mountains in Peru.

Giovanni Ancillotto died in an auto accident at Caravaggio, Lombardy on 18 October 1924.

== Early life ==
Ancillotto was born in San Dona di Piave on 15 November 1896. He was studying engineering at Polytechnic University of Turin when World War I began.

== World War I ==
Ancillotto volunteered for pilot's training. He was accepted on 4 November 1915, with the rank of Soldato. After undergoing basic training at Mirafiori, he was posted to Gaberdini Flying School at Cameri on 5 December. In March 1916, he graduated near the top of his class of 80. In May, he trained at Busto Arsizio and Malpensa. He received his first active posting on 25 June 1916, to 114a Squadriglia. On 31 August 1916, he was promoted to Caporal. On 1 October, he transferred to 27a Squadriglia, remaining with them until 20 December 1916.

On 7 January 1917, Giovanni Ancillotto was accepted as an Aspirante. His next posting was to 30a Squadriglia, on 18 February 1917. He would remain with them until 13 April 1917. His reconnaissance work to this point earned him a Silver award of the Medal for Military Valor.

Ancillotto was selected for conversion training on Nieuport fighters, and took gunnery school at Pisa. On 14 June 1917, he was posted to a fighter squadron, 80a Squadriglia; the squadron was flying operations over the Battles of the Isonzo. Ancillotto scored his first four aerial victories with this squadron in late October and early November 1917, sharing his first with Alvaro Leonardi. On 10 November, he moved to another fighter unit, 77a Squadriglia, where he would win a second silver medal for Military Valor. In the wake of the Battle of Caporetto, Ancillotto waged a campaign against Austro-Hungarian observation balloons. On both 30 November and 3 December 1917, Ancillotto destroyed an enemy balloon. On 5 December, he so aggressively pressed home his attack on a third balloon that he shot his Le Prieur rocket at point blank range and, unable to execute an evasive maneuver, he pierced through the balloon with his aircraft. Despite his severe injuries, Ancillotto managed to return to base with swathes of its envelope basted to his severely damaged aircraft. During this week, he also forced down many other balloons without destroying them.

His dashing courage with the balloons earned him a rare Gold award of the Medal for Military Valor, granted in March 1918. Meanwhile, during February, Ancillotto, Michele Allasia, and another pilot experimented with flying night patrols. On 22 July 1918, he shot down an Austro-Hungarian Hansa-Brandenburg C.I an hour past midnight, at 0105 hours. Two days later, he downed another one at about the same time, at 0055 hours. These pioneering night fighter victories resulted in Ancillotti's third silver medal for Military Valor.

On 6 September 1918, he was withdrawn from combat to serve with the Commissariato Generale Aeronautica (General Commissariat of Aeronautics). He remained in the rear area until 27 October 1918, when he managed to wangle his way back into combat for the war's final offensive, the Battle of Vittorio Veneto. He scored his final aerial victory on 27 October 1918, when he shot down an opposing Pfalz D.III right over its own airfield. The Austro-Hungarians surrendered on 3 November 1918. "Giannino" Ancillotto ended World War I as a Tenente honored with a Gold and three Silver awards of the Medal for Military Valor.

== Post-World War I ==
On 1 February 1919, the Bongiovanni commission approved all 11 of Ancillotti's aerial victory claims.

On 11 September 1919, Ancillotto made a six-hour, nonstop civil flight from Rome to Warsaw, where Poland's Prime Minister, Ignacy Jan Paderewski, greeted him personally upon his arrival. Ultimately, the flight resulted in Italy selling 75 Ansaldo biplanes to the Polish Air Force.

On 2 May 1921, Ancillotto made a flight across the Andes Mountains in Peru, flying from Lima to Cerro de Pasco in an Ansaldo A.1 Balilla in 1 hour 35 minutes, after which he spent 15 minute flying over Cerro de Pasco before landing.

== Death ==
On 18 October 1924, Ancillotto died in an automobile accident in Caravaggio, Lombardy, Italy.
