= Moon Boot =

Snow boot brand

- Industry: Footwear
- Founded: 1969; 57 years ago
- Founder: Giancarlo Zanatta
- Headquarters: Giavera del Montello, Italy
- Products: Footwear for women/men
- Parent: Tecnica Group
- Website: moonboot.com

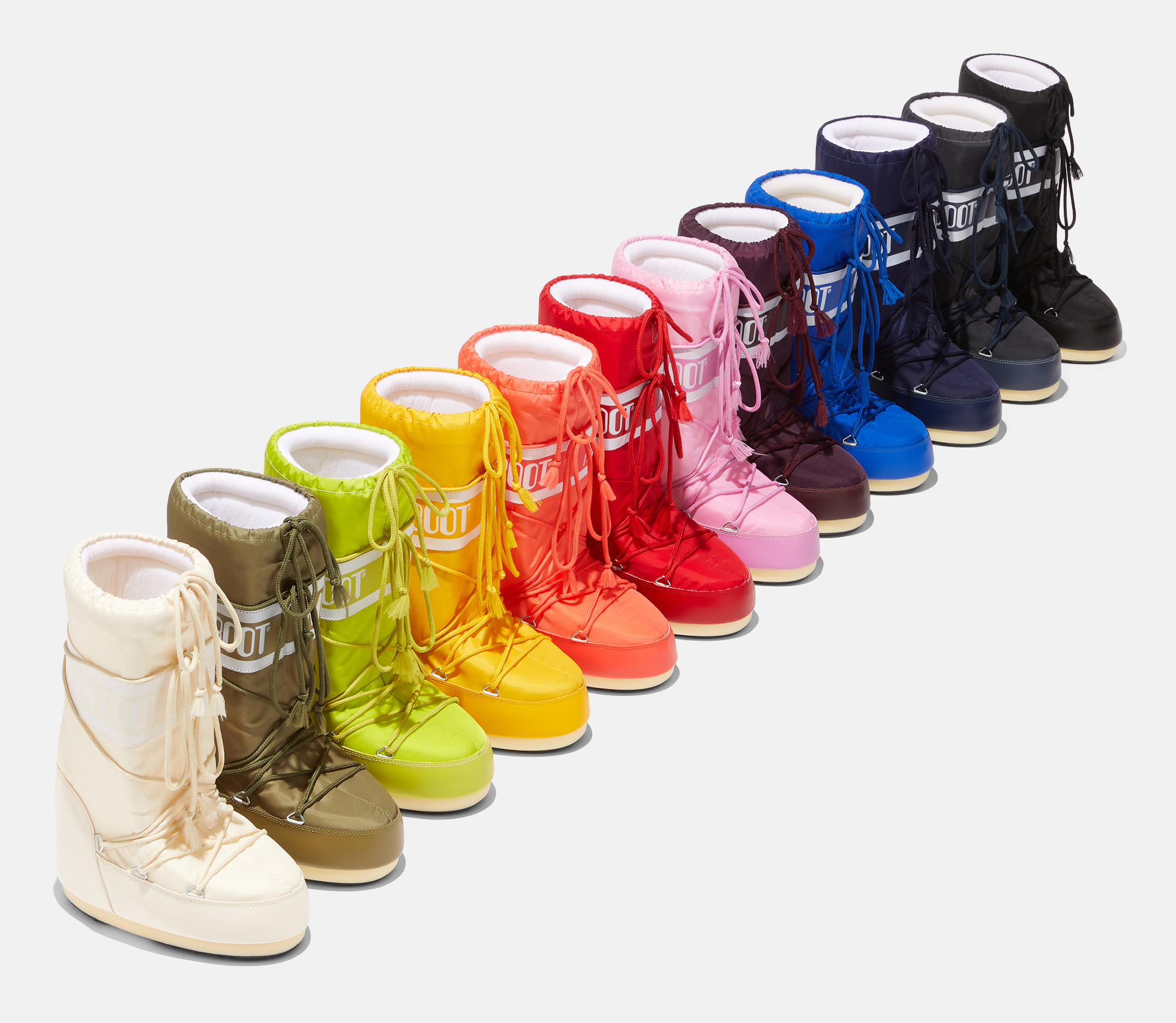
Moon Boots

Moon Boot is a snow boot brand first created as après-ski wear in the early 1970s by manufacturer Tecnica Group of Giavera del Montello in Italy.

== History ==
They became a popular fad in the years following the Apollo 11 Moon landing, and resurfaced as a retrofuturistic fashion trend in the early 2000s. Starting in 2011 they have been produced in Ukraine, at the rate of some 700,000 per year.

The boot is constructed with a thin rubber outsole and cellular rubber midsole covered by nylon fabrics and using polyurethane foams. Company founder Giancarlo Zanatta, after watching the lunar landing and being inspired by the shape and technology of the astronauts' boots, drew sketches and then began to design and develop the original Moon Boot. Tecnica registered worldwide the trademark Moon Boot name in 1978.

== In pop culture ==
- In the 1984 music video for "Last Christmas" by Wham!, some of the cast are wearing Moon Boots.
- In 2004, they received exposure through the nerdy protagonist of the 2004 film Napoleon Dynamite.
- Pete Dougherty, an American DJ and producer, debuted under the stage name "Moon Boots" in 2017.
- In 2022, Dua Lipa and Hailey Bieber posted pictures on social media wearing Moon Boots.
- In 2022, in the episode "Chapter Nine: The Piggyback" of the Netflix series Stranger Things, they appear as contraband smuggled to Russia.
