= Alvaro Leonardi =

Italian flying ace (1895–1955)

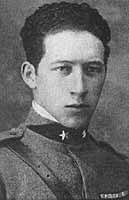
- Born: 16 November 1895; Terni, Kingdom of Italy
- Died: 1 January 1955 (aged 59); Cameri, Italy
- Military career
- Allegiance: Italy
- Branch: Corpo Aeronautico Militare
- Rank: Tenente colonnello
- Units: 41a Squadriglia, 80a Squadriglia
- Awards: 2 Silver awards of Medal for Military Valor

Tenente colonnello Alvaro Leonardi (16 November 1895 – 1 January 1955) was a World War I Sottotenente from Italy and a flying ace credited with eight aerial victories.

== Early life and service ==
Alvaro Leonardi was born in Terni, Kingdom of Italy, on 16 November 1895. In September 1915, just after Italy entered World War I, Leonardi served in the Technical Services Department of the Italian military. He was then posted to the 6th Railroad Engineers' Regiment before transferring to aviation.

== World War I aviation service ==
He attended aviation training at Mirafiori, and was awarded his wings for the Caudron G.3 on 29 April 1916. In May, he went to aerial observers training at Centocelle Airport. He was then sent to a unit flying two-seater reconnaissance craft, 41a Squadriglia. On 31 July, he was promoted to Caporal; on 31 October to Sergente. He was then packed off for training as a fighter pilot, arriving at Cascina Costa on 3 November 1916. He trained on Nieuports, and was assigned to the Malpensa defence flight on 25 January 1917. The following month, he rejoined 80a Squadriglia. On 2 May 1917, he was officially rated as a Nieuport pilot. On 24 May, he scored his first aerial victory. He continued to score throughout 1917 and 1918, posting his eleventh claim on 20 August 1918; though most of his claims were singular, he did share one each with Giovanni Ancillotto and Cosimo Rizzotto.

On 25 October 1918, Leonardi was transferred out of combat, being assigned to 122a Squadriglia. When the war ended, Alvaro Leonardi had flown 140 fighter escort missions in 700 hours of flight time, and engaged in 21 combats to stake his 11 victory claims. He had earned two awards of the Silver Medal for Military Valor.

== Post World War I ==
On 1 February 1919, the Bongiovanni military intelligence committee approved eight of Leonardi's victory claims and denied three. On 6 November 1919, Leonardi was discharged from military service.

Leonardi later joined the Regia Aeronautica that had replaced the Corpo Aeronautico Militare. He became an instructor in April 1934. He served in a number of posts during the late 1930s and the start of World War II, rising to Tenente colonnello in March 1938.

When the Armistice of Cassibile was signed between Italy and the Allies on 3 September 1943, Leonardi was caught on the Nazi side of the lines. In March 1944, Leonardi reached out to the Italian resistance movement opposing the German occupiers. Postwar, he retired from military service in February 1946.

Alvaro Leonardi died in Cameri, Italy on 1 January 1955.

== Sources ==
- Franks, Norman; Guest, Russell; Alegi, Gregory. Above the War Fronts: The British Two-seater Bomber Pilot and Observer Aces, the British Two-seater Fighter Observer Aces, and the Belgian, Italian, Austro-Hungarian and Russian Fighter Aces, 1914–1918: Volume 4 of Fighting Airmen of WWI Series: Volume 4 of Air Aces of WWI. Grub Street, 1997. ISBN 1-898697-56-6, ISBN 978-1-898697-56-5.
