= Cosimo Rizzotto =

Italian World War I flying ace

- Born: 26 June 1893; Colognola ai Colli, Kingdom of Italy
- Died: 18 February 1963 (aged 69); Milan, Italy
- Military career
- Allegiance: Italy
- Branch: Aviation
- Rank: Sergente
- Unit: 77a Squadriglia
- Awards: 2 Silver awards of Medal for Military Valor
- Other work: Flying instructor in South America

Sergente Cosimo Rizzotto (1893–1963) was a World War I flying ace credited with six aerial victories.

== Early life ==
Cosimo Rizzotto was born on 26 June 1893, in Colognola ai Colli, Kingdom of Italy.

== World War I ==
Rizzotto joined the Bataglione Aviatori on 23 September 1913 as a private. He would not be selected for pilot's training until May 1915. He learned to fly at San Giusto, and took advanced training on Maurice Farmans beginning 19 December 1915. In January 1916, Rizzotto was promoted to caporal. Within two months, he began flying a Nieuport as part of a detachment stationed at Cascina Costa. Rizzotto subsequently spent from 30 March through 30 May 1916 in Paris. In July 1916, he was assigned to be a Nieuport pilot with 77a Squadriglia. Between 28 February 1917 and 15 June 1918, he scored six aerial victories, including one shared with Alvaro Leonardi; he also had an unconfirmed claim. His first victory earned him a Silver Medal for Military Valor; his next four victories, from July through November 1917, earned him another.

== Postwar ==
Rizzotto lived in both Argentina and Paraguay, making his living as a flying instructor, and fighting in the government side in the 1922 Paraguayan Civil War. However, he eventually returned to Italy, dying in Milan on 18 February 1963.
