= Blizzard Sport =

Austrian skiing equipment manufacturer

Blizzard Sport GmbH
- Type: Subsidiary
- Industry: Sports equipment
- Founded: 1945; 81 years ago
- Founder: Anton Arnsteiner
- Headquarters: Mittersill, Salzburg, Austria
- Products: Skis, backpacks, ski bags
- Parent: Tecnica Group
- Website: blizzard-tecnica.com

Blizzard is an Austrian sports equipment company, based in Mittersill, Salzburg, Austria. Blizzard is currently a division of the Italian Tecnica Group S.p.A. and is specialized in the manufacturing of alpine skiing equipment, including skis and accessories such as backpacks and ski bags.

== History ==
Blizzard was established in 1945 by Anton Arnsteiner (1925–2013, "der Toni"), as he returned home from the Second World War, and started producing skis besides wooden furniture in the family joinery workshop.

The "Blizzard" brand was registered in 1953. In 1954, Blizzard became the first manufacturer to mass-produce polyethylene ski bases. Blizzard's first expansion occurred in 1957, coinciding with the introduction of metal and fiberglass as new materials. 1963 saw a great part of the factory burned down. In 1970, as production reached 500,000 skis per year, the company name was changed from "Blizzard Skifabrik Anton Arnsteiner" to "Blizzard GmbH". In 1976 a second production site was opened near Munich.

In 1980 Blizzard introduced the "Thermoski", after 6 years of development. In 1996 Blizzard introduced its first carving ski, but it also applied for insolvency and was bought up by US company Scott Sports.

It was sold to Karl Hofstätter (33.3%) and Anton Stöckl (66.6%) in 2005, who sold it to the Tecnica Group in 2006 and 2007, respectively.

Sales of Blizzard skis are now completely integrated in the sale organization of Tecnica Group.

== Alpine racing ==
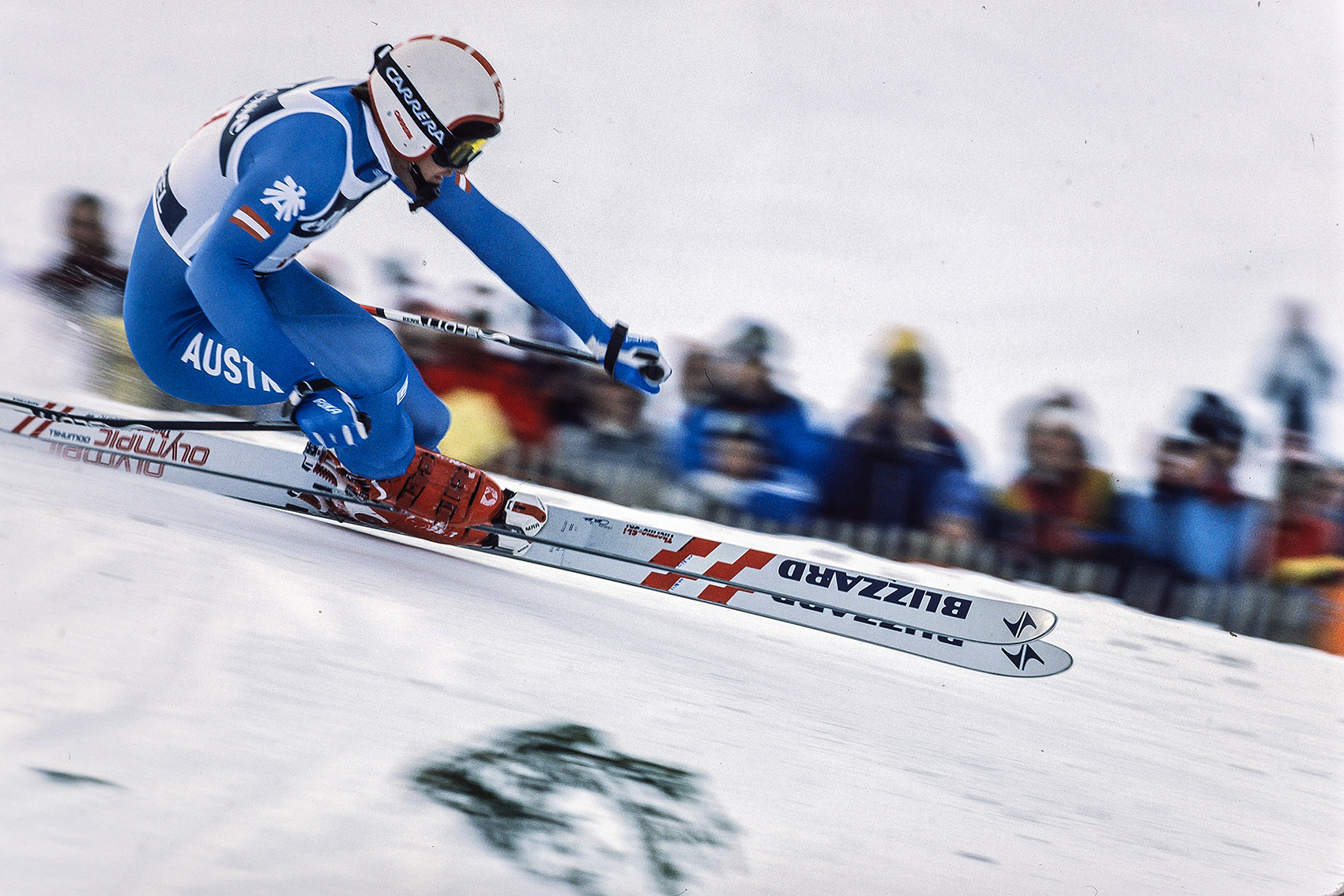
Franz Klammer racing with Blizzard skis

Blizzard's presence on the FIS Alpine World Cup circuit is represented by several racers, including Austrian Reinfried Herbst and Japanese racer Akira Sasaki.

Throughout the years, Blizzard won many awards with its skiers team:

- 1958: Frieda Dänzer (CH) wins the first champion title on Blizzard skis in the triple combination. Roger Staub wins silver in the giant slalom, Jean Vuarnet (FR) fetches bronze in downhill.
- 1962: Christl Haas, Erika Netzer and Marianne Jahn: won 3-times victory and World Championship Gold. Silver at the giant slalom on the new EPOXI-Ski.
- 1964: Gold at the Olympic Games in Innsbruck for Christl Haas in downhill.
- 1983: Franz Klammer wins the downhill World Cup and Blizzard is the most successful brand at the men's downhill 1982/83.
- 1990: Petra Kronberger won three consecutive seasons, the Ladies World Cup. The Austrian athlete wins as the first woman all 5 disciplines in the World Cup.
- 1992: Gold medals in the combination and downhill at the Olympics in Albertville. Kronberger is one of the most successful skiers in history.
- 1998: Michaela Dorfmeister finished the Olympic Games in Nagano with silver in the Super-G.
- 2000: Renate Götschl wins the overall World Cup and the small crystal globe in Super-G. The overall standings at the giant slalom goes to Michaela Dorfmeister.
- 2002: the overall World Cup victory goes to Michaela Dorfmeister.

As of February 25, 2007, Blizzard placed 10th in the overall World Cup points standings.

In March 2007, Blizzard announced that former World Cup racer and US Pro Tour champion Bernhard Knauss would be taking over as Blizzard's race manager.

In 2010, Reinfried Herbst wins on the new Blizzard Ski the Slalom World Cup and gets the small crystal globe.

At the 2014 Winter Olympics, Blizzard won the first Olympic gold medal in the men's slalom won by Mario Matt and a victory in the Freeride World Tour by Loic Collomb-Patton.
