= Povegliano, Veneto =

Povegliano Pojan (Venetian)
- Comune
- Comune di Povegliano
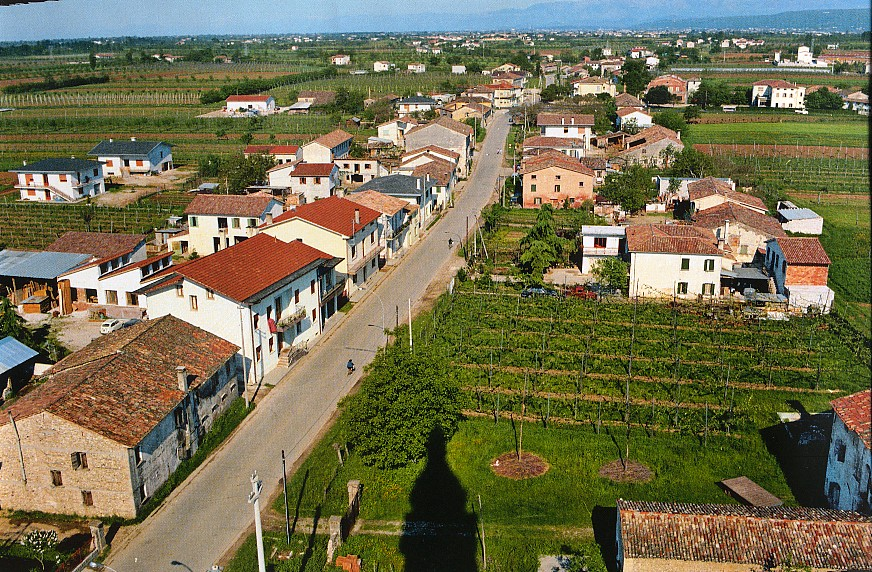

- Coat of arms

- Location within Italy Location within Veneto
- Coordinates: 45°46′N 12°12′E
- Country: Italy
- Region: Veneto
- Province: Treviso (TV)
- Frazioni: Camalò, Santandrà

Government
  - Mayor: Rino Manzan

Area
  - Total: 12.9 km^{2} (5.0 sq mi)

Population (31 August 2009)
  - Total: 5,036
  - Density: 390/km^{2} (1,010/sq mi)
- Demonym: Poveglianesi
- Time zone: UTC+1 (CET)
  - Summer (DST): UTC+2 (CEST)
- Postal code: 31050
- Dialing code: 0422
- Website: Official website

Povegliano (Venetian: Pojan) is a comune (municipality) in the Province of Treviso in the Italian region Veneto, located about 40 kilometres (25 mi) north of Venice and about 12 kilometres (7 mi) northwest of Treviso.

Povegliano borders the following municipalities: Arcade, Giavera del Montello, Ponzano Veneto, Villorba, Volpago del Montello.
