= Bagnaria Arsa =

Bagnaria Arsa Bagnarie (Friulian)
- Comune
- Comune di Bagnaria Arsa
- Location within Italy Location within Friuli-Venezia Giulia
- Coordinates: 45°53′N 13°17′E
- Country: Italy
- Region: Friuli-Venezia Giulia
- Province: Udine (UD)
- Frazioni: Campolonghetto, Castions delle Mura, Privano, Sevegliano

Government
  - Mayor: Cristiano Tiussi

Area
  - Total: 19.23 km^{2} (7.42 sq mi)
- Highest elevation: 22 m (72 ft)
- Lowest elevation: 3 m (9.8 ft)

Population (28 February 2017)
  - Total: 3,507
  - Density: 182.4/km^{2} (472.3/sq mi)
- Demonym: Bagnaresi
- Time zone: UTC+1 (CET)
  - Summer (DST): UTC+2 (CEST)
- Postal code: 33050
- Dialing code: 0432
- Website: Official website

Bagnaria Arsa (Friulian: Bagnarie) is a comune (municipality) in the Regional decentralization entity of Udine in the Italian region of Friuli-Venezia Giulia, located about 50 kilometres (31 mi) northwest of Trieste and about 20 kilometres (12 mi) south of Udine.

The municipality of Bagnaria Arsa is formed by the frazioni (boroughs) Campolonghetto, Castions delle Mura, Privano, and Sevegliano, which houses the municipal seat.

Bagnaria Arsa borders the following municipalities: Aiello del Friuli, Cervignano del Friuli, Gonars, Palmanova, Torviscosa, Visco.
