= Commemorative Medal of the Fiume Expedition =

Italian military award

- Medaglia commemorativa della spedizione di Fiume
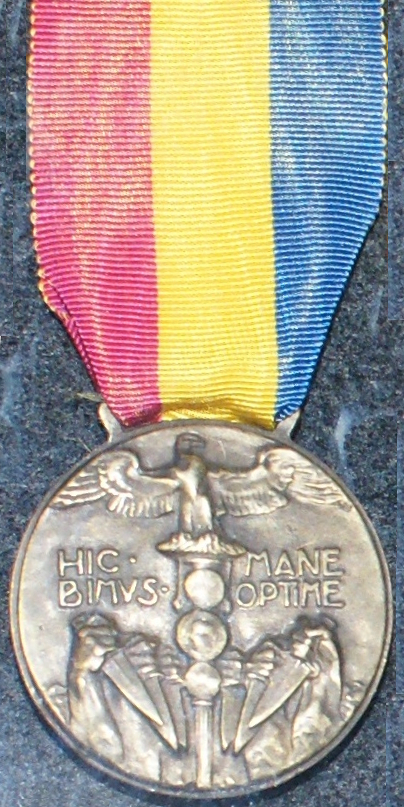
- The obverse of the medal.
- Type: Commemorative medal
- Awarded for: Service related to the Italian occupation of Fiume
- Presented by: Italian Regency of Carnaro (1919–1920); Free State of Fiume (1920–1924); Kingdom of Italy (1926–1946)
- Eligibility: Military personnel
- Formerly called: Commemorative Medal of the Ronchi March (Medaglia commemorativa della marcia di Ronchi)
- Established: September 1919 (unofficial); 31 January 1926 (official)
- First award: 1919

Highlights
- Total: 11,165
- Ribbon of the medal

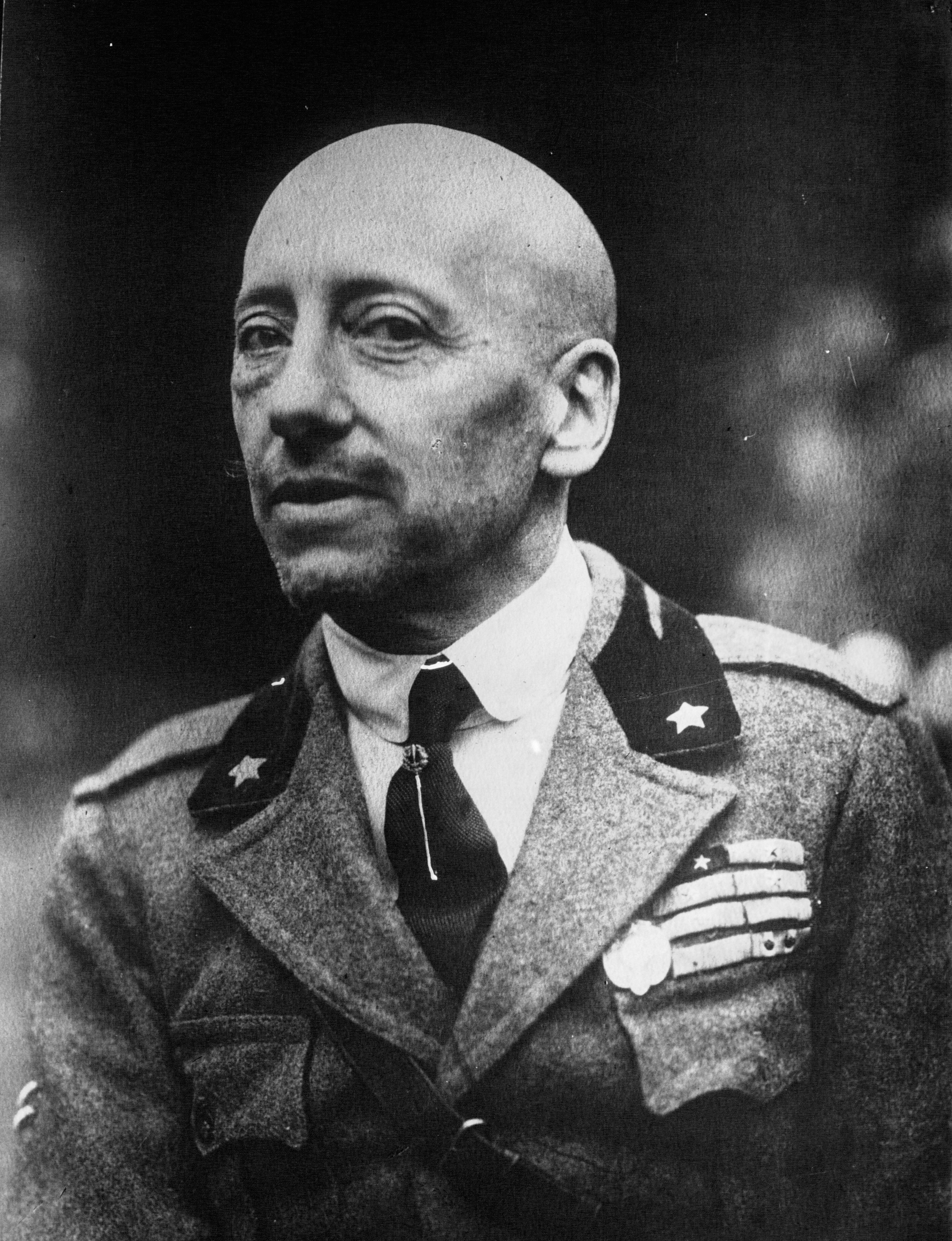
Gabriele D'Annunzio in 1922.

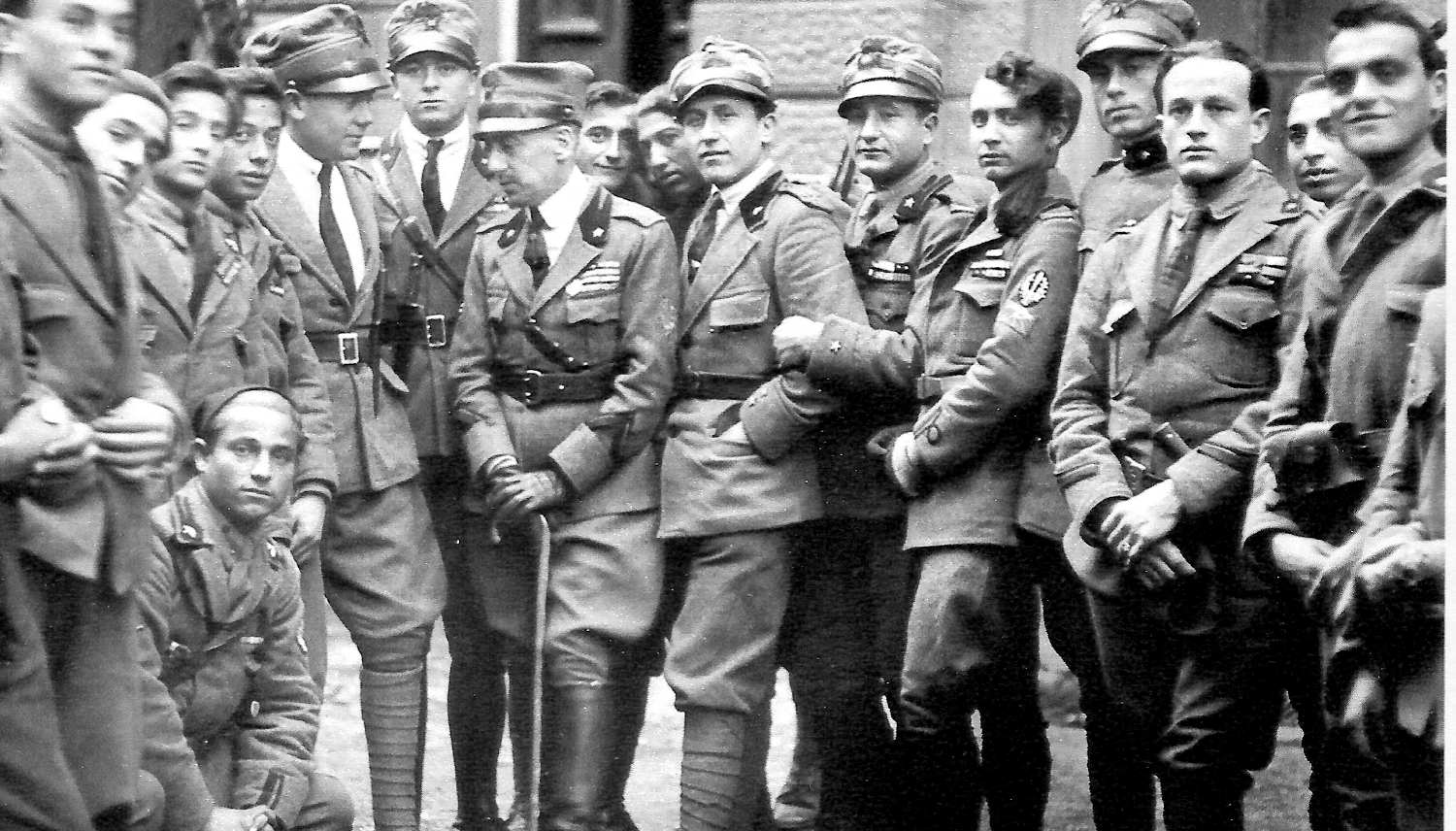
Gabriele d'Annunzio (center, with cane) and some of his "legionaries" at Fiume in 1919.

The Commemorative Medal of the Fiume Expedition (Italian: Medaglia commemorativa della spedizione di Fiume) was a decoration granted by the Kingdom of Italy to personnel who took part in the Italian seizure and occupation of Fiume (now Rijeka) after World War I. It originated in 1919 as the Commemorative Medal of the Ronchi March (Italian: Medaglia commemorativa della marcia di Ronchi), a decoration of the Italian Regency of Carnaro, and was adopted by the Kingdom of Italy in 1926.

== Background ==
On 26 April 1915, the Kingdom of Italy signed the Treaty of London with France, the Russian Empire, and the United Kingdom, under which Italy agreed to enter World War I on the side of the Allies with the understanding that if the Allies defeated the Central Powers, Italy after the war would gain control of the Austrian Littoral with the exception of Fiume (now Rijeka). Austria-Hungary disintegrated in October 1918, and the war ended in Allied victory in November 1918. At the postwar Paris Peace Conference in 1919, Italy, as promised in 1915, was granted the Austrian Littoral except for Fiume, which was incorporated into the new Kingdom of the Serbs, Croats, and Slovenes (which in 1929 was renamed the Kingdom of Yugoslavia).

Considering Fiume to be an Italian city and angered by the Kingdom of Italy's agreement to surrender it to foreign control, the Italian nationalist, poet, playwright, orator, journalist, and aristocrat Gabriele D'Annunzio, who had served as an officer and aviator in the Italian Royal Army (Italian: Regio Esercito) during World War I, led 2,600 so-called "legionaries" from Ronchi di Monfalcone in Italy to Fiume on 12 September 1919, an event known in Italy as the Impresa di Fiume ("Fiume endeavor" or "Fiume enterprise"). They succeeded in seizing Fiume the same day, and D'Annunzio immediately announced Italy's annexation of Fiume. (In honor of this achievement Ronchi di Monfalcone was renamed Ronchi dei Legionari in 1925.)

The Kingdom of Italy opposed D'Annunzio's actions, demanded that the plotters of the Impresa di Fiume surrender. and instituted a blockade of Fiume to pressure D'Annunzio into relinquishing control of the city. In December 1919, a plebiscite in Fiume decisively approved a modus vivendi Italy had proposed that month under which Italy would recognize Fiume's desire for Italian annexation and consider only the wishes of Fiume's population in future negotiations, but D'Annunzio, not trusting Italy to be able to fulfill its promises and unable to negotiate further Italian concessions, rejected the modus vivendi and instead declared Fiume to be under the control of the Italian Regency of Carnaro (Italian: Reggenza Italiana del Carnaro) with himself as Duce ("leader").

On 12 November 1920, the Kingdom of Italy and the Kingdom of the Serbs, Croats, and Slovenes signed the Treaty of Rapallo, which made Fiume an independent state as the Free State of Fiume. Claiming that the Treaty of Rapallo was illegal, D'Annunzio ignored it, and the Italian Regency of Carnaro declared war on Italy. After D'Annunzio refused an Italian ultimatum to surrender, the Italian Armed Forces attacked Fiume, resulting in the "Bloody Christmas" (Croatian: Riječki krvavi božić; Italian: Natale di sangue) clashes of 24–29 December 1920. These resulted in D'Annunzio's surrender and the establishment of the Free State of Fiume. The Free State of Fiume survived until 1924, when the Kingdom of Italy, by then under the fascist government of Benito Mussolini, annexed it and made it the Italian Province of Fiume.

== History ==
The Commemorative Medal of the Fiume Expedition originated as the Commemorative Medal of the Ronchi March, an unofficial decoration of the Italian Regency of Carnaro established by D'Annunzio immediately after the occupation of Fiume on 12 September 1919. Following D'Annunzio's precise instructions, the Italian painter, xylographer, illustrator, and photographer Adolfo De Carolis created a model of the medal. S. Johnson of Milan, Italy, used the model to mint the medals. By a royal decree of 31 January 1926, the medal became an official decoration of the Kingdom of Italy.

Two hundred examples of the first edition of the medal were minted and delivered in 1919 and 1920 to the legionaries who entered Fiume with d'Annunzio. A second edition was delivered between 1919 and 1936, and a third between 1937 and 1945. A total of 11,165 medals were produced. After World War II ended in 1945, additional copies of the medal were produced.

In 1935, D'Annunzio donated his medal, with three clasps, to the Kingdom of Italy along with other medals and a badge depicting a sword (in gold and silver) bearing the motto COSA FATTA CAPO HA ("WHAT THE LEADER HAS DONE"). A gold version of the medal awarded to Arturo Toscanini is preserved at the La Scala Theater Museum in Milan.

== Eligibility ==
Eligibility for the medal initially extended to:

- "Legionaries" who arrived in Fiume in 1919 after taking part in the Ronchi march;
- The crew of the Italian Regia Marina ("Royal Navy") troopship Cortellazzo who arrived in Fiume on 22 September 1919 and thereafter supported D'Annunzio;
- Personnel who fought in the "Bloody Christmas" clashes between 24 and 28 December 1920;
- Well-known personalities who contributed in various ways to the Fiume cause.

Under the royal decree of 31 January 1926, the Kingdom of Italy extended eligibility for the medal to members of the Voluntary Militia for National Security (Italian: Milizia Volontaria per la Sicurezza Nazionale, or MVSN), commonly called the "Blackshirts." By royal decree of 15 July 1938, members of the Italian Armed Forces also became eligible for the medal.

== Appearance ==
=== Medal ===
The medal is a bronze disc with a diameter of 39 millimetres (1.5 in) and an inverted U-shaped attachment for the ribbon. On the obverse, the lower part of the medal depicts arms raising daggers with a Roman vexillum in the center supporting an eagle with spread wings in the upper part of the medal. On either side of the vexillum, the medal bears the Latin inscription "HIC MANEBIMUS OPTIME" ("WE'LL BE FINE HERE"), written on two lines as "HIC – MANE" on the upper line and "BIMUS – OPTIME" on the lower line, with the vexillum in between the two words in each case. The reverse bears the inscription "AI / LIBERATORI / XII-SETTEMBRE/MCMXIX" ("TO THE LIBERATORS 12 SEPTEMBER 1919"), written across four lines, above a laurel wreath. The bottom edge of the reverse bears the inscription "FIUME D'ITALIA" ("FIUME OF ITALY") on an unrolled parchment. The medal does not bear signatures or brands to indicate its engraver or manufacturer.

The first-edition medals were not created with a homogenous minting process, and as a result they varied in weight from 36 to 41.5 grams (1.27 to 1.46 oz). They were minted with a green-black patina to give them the appearance of antiques as soon as they were minted. The second-edition medals were made of dark bronze, were brown or black in color, and varied in weight between 34 and 35 grams (1.2 and 1.2 oz). Third-edition medals also are made of dark bronze, range in color from dark brown almost black, and vary in weight between 30 and 33 grams (1.1 and 1.2 oz). Post-World War II copies of the medal vary in weight between 25 and 29 grams (0.88 and 1.02 oz).

In addition to the bronze medals, seven medals were minted in gold and awarded to:

- The pennon of the "legionaries" who marched from Ronchi di Monfalconi to Fiume on 12 September 1919.
- Gabriele D'Annunzio.
- Pilot Captain Ernesto Cabruna, Italian flying ace who supported D'Annunzio's revolt in Fiume against the Kingdom of Italy;
- Giovanni Host-Venturi, Italian irredentist who created the "Legion of Fiume" in Fiume in 1919 to defend Fiume against French occupying forces who had taken a pro-Yugoslav stance and later was instrumental in organizing the Impresa di Fiume.
- Antonio Masperi, D'Annunzio's luogotenente ("lieutenant general") in Fiume.
- Arturo Toscanini, Italian conductor who supported D'Annunzio by conducting the La Scala opera ensemble in Fiume in 1920 in one of its first stops on a marathon tour of Europe and North America.
- Guglielmo Marconi, who visited Fiume in September 1920 to convince D'Annunzio to leave but instead allowed D'Annunzio to board his yacht and broadcast a radio message from it to the world about the Fiume cause.

=== Ribbon ===
The ribbon has three identical vertical bands of blue, yellow, and carmine, the colors of the coat of arms of the comune ("commune") of Fiume.
