= Visco, Friuli Venezia Giulia =

Visco Visc (Friulian)
- Comune
- Comune di Visco
- Location within Italy Location within Friuli-Venezia Giulia
- Coordinates: 45°54′N 13°21′E
- Country: Italy
- Region: Friuli-Venezia Giulia
- Province: UD (UD)

Area
  - Total: 3.5 km^{2} (1.4 sq mi)
- Elevation: 27 m (89 ft)

Population (Dec. 2004)
  - Total: 723
  - Density: 210/km^{2} (540/sq mi)
- Demonym: Vischesi
- Time zone: UTC+1 (CET)
  - Summer (DST): UTC+2 (CEST)
- Postal code: 33040
- Dialing code: 0432
- Patron saint: Saint Peter, Saint Mary of the Snow
- Saint day: 29 June
- Website: Official website

Visco (Friulian: Visc) is a comune (municipality) in the Regional decentralization entity of Udine in the Italian region of Friuli-Venezia Giulia, located about 45 kilometres (28 mi) northwest of Trieste and about 20 kilometres (12 mi) southeast of Udine. As of 31 December 2004, it had a population of 723 and an area of 3.5 square kilometres (1.4 mi^{2}).

Visco borders the following municipalities: Aiello del Friuli, Bagnaria Arsa, Palmanova, San Vito al Torre.

== Notable people ==
- Eduard Michael Avian (6 August 1877 – 30 October 1910), owner of a construction company in Klagenfurt; important buildings: church of Tanzenberg Castle and House Guttenberg in Klagenfurt

== Demographic evolution ==
Historical population

Year	Pop.	±%
1861	?	—
1871	?	—
1881	?	—
1901	?	—
1911	?	—

Year	Pop.	±%
1921	895	—
1931	774	−13.5%
1936	680	−12.1%
1951	968	+42.4%
1961	768	−20.7%

Year	Pop.	±%
1971	696	−9.4%
1981	707	+1.6%
1991	689	−2.5%
2001	697	+1.2%

Source: Data from ISTAT
