= Tecnica Group =

Italian sportswear brand

Coordinates: 45.7895953°N 12.179946°E

Tecnica Group S.p.A.
- Industry: Sport equipment
- Founded: 1960
- Founder: Giancarlo Zanatta
- Headquarters: Giavera del Montello, Italy
- Key people: Alberto Zanatta (Chairman of The Board of Directors); Giancarlo Zanatta (Founder); Giovanni Zoppas (CEO, General Manager)
- Number of employees: 1350
- Website: Tecnica Group

Tecnica Group is a sport equipment manufacturer in the market of footwear and winter sports equipment founded in Giavera del Montello, Treviso, Italy. Tecnica Group brands include Blizzard, Lowa, Moon Boot, Nordica, Rollerblade, and Tecnica.

== History ==
Tecnica Group was established in the 1960s. Over the years several additional brands became part of the Group and today it covers various product categories, specifically footwear, ski boots, skis, outdoor and inline skates.

In 1930 Oreste Zanatta founded a small shop focused on working boots production, that officially became in 1960 the Calzaturificio Tecnica SpA.

Over the following ten years, Tecnica expanded its business and created the first Moon Boot.

In 1985 Tecnica entered the outdoor footwear market.

This happened through the purchase, in 1993, of LOWA, the historical outdoor shoemaker in Germany.

In 2002, with the acquisition of Nordica, Tecnica Group became the first world producer of ski boots.

In 2003, the product range was extended further after Rollerblade, the inventor of inline skating, was acquired.

The latest arrival in 2006 has been the Austrian brand Blizzard – a ski producer.

Historically owned by the Zanatta family, from 2017 the company has expanded the corporate structure to Italmobiliare, which has acquired 40% of the Group's investments.

In 2019 the group acquired Riko Sport, Lowa's main footwear supplier.

The Group's Chairman is Alberto Zanatta, son of the founder Giancarlo, who is still a board member.

In 2021 Giovanni Zoppas became CEO and General Manager.
