= Villorba =

Villorba Viłorba (Venetian)
- Comune
- Comune di Villorba
- Coat of arms

- Location within Italy Location within Veneto
- Coordinates: 45°44′N 12°14′E
- Country: Italy
- Region: Veneto
- Province: Treviso (TV)
- Frazioni: Catena, Fontane, Lancenigo (municipal seat), Villorba

Government
  - Mayor: Marco Serena (LN)

Area
  - Total: 30.6 km^{2} (11.8 sq mi)
- Elevation: 26 m (85 ft)

Population (31 December 2015)
  - Total: 18,056
  - Density: 590/km^{2} (1,530/sq mi)
- Demonym: Villorbesi
- Time zone: UTC+1 (CET)
  - Summer (DST): UTC+2 (CEST)
- Postal code: 31050, 31020
- Dialing code: 0422
- Patron saint: St. Sebastian
- Website: Official website

Villorba (Italian: [vilˈlɔrba]; Venetian: Viłorba [viˈɰɔɾba]) is a comune (municipality) in the Province of Treviso in the Italian region Veneto, located about 35 kilometres (22 mi) north of Venice and about 8 kilometres (5 mi) north of Treviso.

Villorba borders the following municipalities: Arcade, Carbonera, Ponzano Veneto, Povegliano, Spresiano, Treviso.

== Twin towns ==
Villorba is twinned with:

- Arborea, Italy
