= Giavera del Montello Municipal Stadium =

Stadium in Giavera del Montello, Italy

- Location: Via della Stazione, 13, 31040 Giavera del Montello TV, Italy
- Coordinates: 45°47′32″N 12°10′32″E

The Giavera del Montello Municipal Stadium (Italian: Stadio Communale di Giavera del Montello) is a football stadium and former motorcycle speedway venue, in Giavera del Montello, Italy. The stadium is situated approximately 18 kilometres north of Treviso, on the Via della Stazione and hosts the football team Giavera Calcio.

== History ==
Organised by the Moto Club Montello, the stadium was a significant venue for motorcycle speedway and hosted many important events, including qualifying rounds of the Speedway World Championship in 1979 and 1980 a semi-final round of the Speedway World Pairs Championship on 7 June 1981 and a qualifying round of the Speedway World Team Cup in 1983.

In 2018, a new grandstand was added.
