= Nordica (company) =

Italian winter sports equipment company

Coordinates: 45.7895953°N 12.179946°E

- Company type: Division
- Industry: Sports equipment
- Founded: 1939; 87 years ago
- Founder: Adriano and Oddone Vaccari
- Headquarters: Giavera del Montello, Italy
- Products: Skis, boots, sportswear, gloves, bags
- Parent: Tecnica Group
- Website: nordica.com

Nordica is an Italian manufacturing company of winter sports products, focusing on skiing. Based in Giavera del Montello, Nordica is currently a division of Tecnica Group, after it was acquired from Benetton in 2003.

The current range of products include skis, boots, poles, and accessories such as sportswear, gloves, and bags.

== History ==
In 1939, after years of experience as traders in hides, the brothers Adriano and Oddone Vaccari founded Nordica in Montebelluna, making casual footwear. In the after-war years Nordica specialised in ski boots, although continuing to supply the market with cross-country ski shoes and climbing boots. Work was still seasonal and the equipment manual.

In 1950 the Italian skier Zeno Colò gave his name to a Nordica ski boot and to a revolutionary lining designed by Colmar. Zeno became World Champion with Nordica both in the downhill and the giant slalom of the 1950 World Championships in Aspen, Colorado and gave his name to a ski boot made by the company in Trevignano.

The 1960s saw several new introductions: the buckle, a fastening system conceived in Austria and applied for the first time in Italy by Nordica, was introduced in 1963. Also introduced in that year was the all-polyurethane ski boot; specific molds (one for the right boot and one for the left) and injection presses were developed as well.

In 1968 the leather upper of the traditional models was plastic-coated externally using polyurethane or PVC and the cuff was raised.

Nordica set up its first affiliate in the United States, which was the result of an agreement between Nordica and Rossignol. Other affiliates were opened in Austria, Japan, Switzerland, France and Germany. In 1989, the Benetton Group purchased Nordica for US$ 120 million. By the time of the acquisition, Nordica reported sales of US$225 million (1,7 million pairs of boots).

In 2003 the Nordica brand was purchased again by the Tecnica Group, after sales decreased to US$97,5 million on 730,000 pairs of boots plus 100,000 pairs of skis. The new corporate strategy is aimed at the ski sector with particular attention being paid to racing products and to the competition sector.

In 2006 Nordica introduced XBI, a fully integrated balance improvement system.

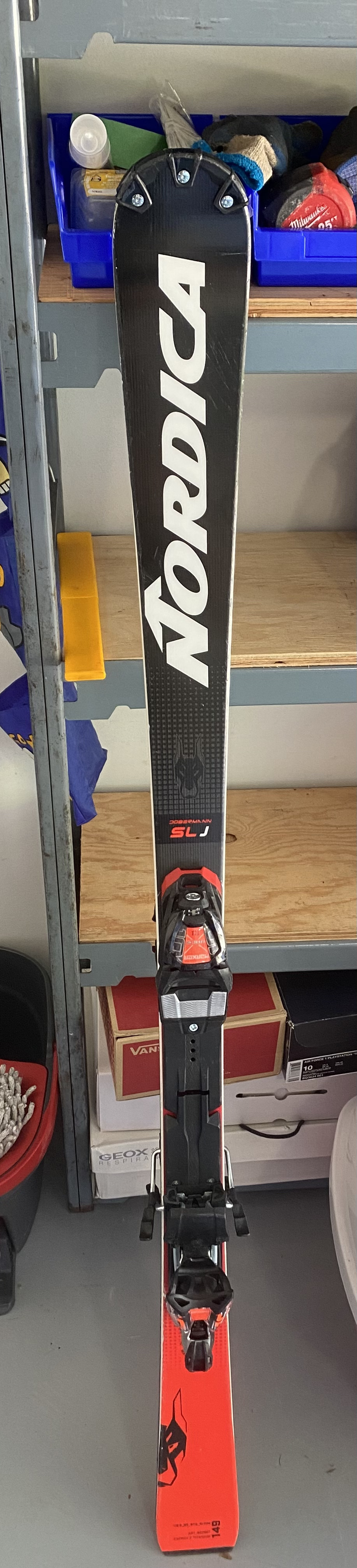
Nordica Dobermann SLJ kids skis

== See also ==
- Tommy Moe's Winter Extreme: Skiing & Snowboarding
