= Marcon, Veneto =

Marcon
- Comune
- Comune di Marcon
- Location within Italy Location within Veneto
- Coordinates: 45°34′N 12°18′E
- Country: Italy
- Region: Veneto
- Metropolitan city: Venice (VE)
- Frazioni: Gaggio, San Liberale Località: Il Colmello, Praello, Zuccarello

Government
  - Mayor: Matteo Romanello

Area
  - Total: 25.58 km^{2} (9.88 sq mi)
- Elevation: 4 m (13 ft)

Population (31 October 2017)
  - Total: 17,536
  - Density: 685.5/km^{2} (1,776/sq mi)
- Demonym: Marconesi
- Time zone: UTC+1 (CET)
  - Summer (DST): UTC+2 (CEST)
- Postal code: 30020
- Dialing code: 041
- Patron saint: Saint George
- Saint day: 23 April
- Website: Official website

Marcon is a comune in the Metropolitan City of Venice, the region of Veneto, northern Italy.

It contains the hamlets of Gaggio and San Liberale. It is bordered by Mogliano Veneto, Quarto d'Altino, and Venice.

== Transportation ==
It has a railway station.

== Nature reserves ==
The local nature reserve and tourist sites is the Riserva Naturale Gaggio Nord.
