= Arcade, Veneto =

Arcade
- Comune
- Comune di Arcade
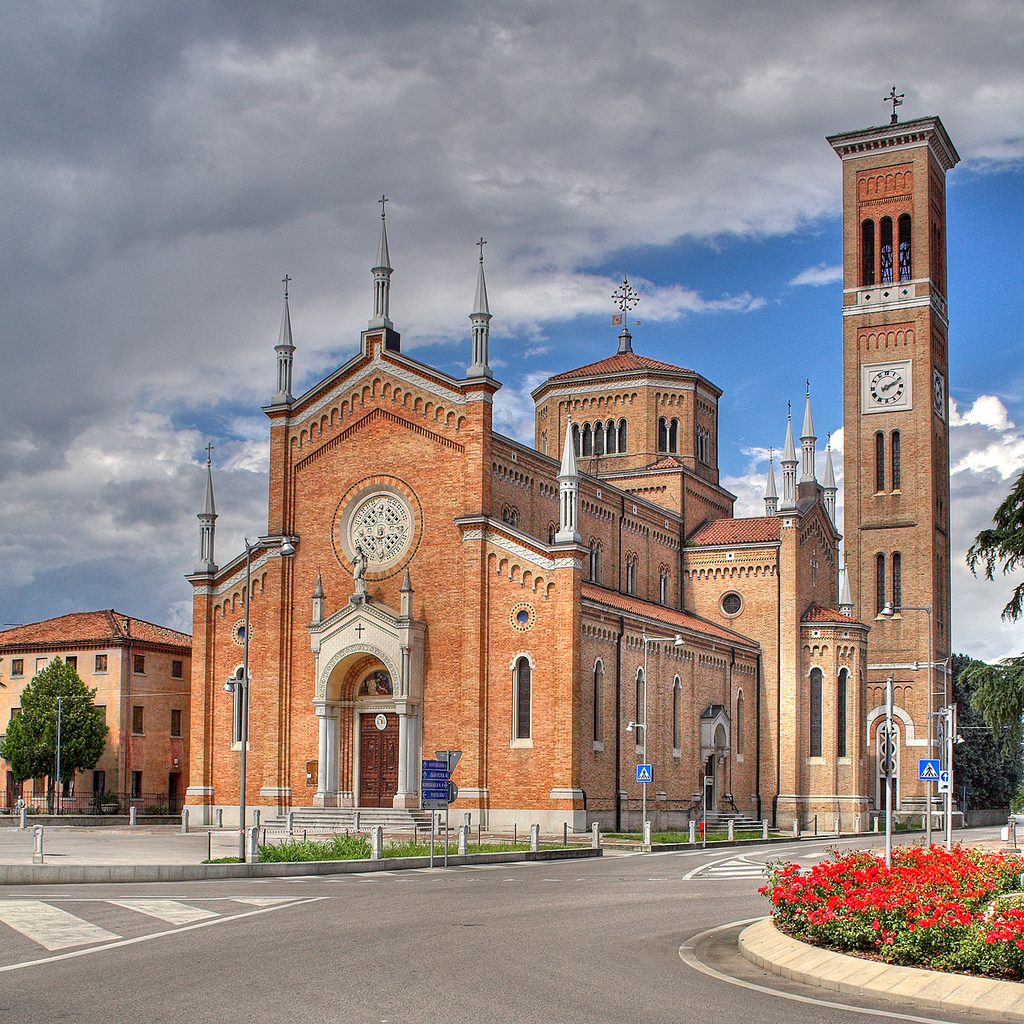
- Parish church.

- Coat of arms

- Location of Arcade in Italy Arcade (Veneto)
- Coordinates: 45°46′N 12°13′E
- Country: Italy
- Region: Veneto
- Province: Treviso (TV)

Government
  - Mayor: Domenico Presti

Area
  - Total: 8.41 km^{2} (3.25 sq mi)
- Elevation: 60 m (200 ft)

Population (31 December 2022)
  - Total: 4,504
  - Density: 536/km^{2} (1,390/sq mi)
- Demonym: Arcadesi
- Time zone: UTC+1 (CET)
  - Summer (DST): UTC+2 (CEST)
- Postal code: 31030
- Dialing code: 0422
- Patron saint: St. Lawrence
- Saint day: 10 August
- Website: Official website

Arcade is a comune in the province of Treviso, Veneto, northern Italy.

Arcade borders the following municipalities: Giavera del Montello, Nervesa della Battaglia, Povegliano, Spresiano, Villorba.

== History ==
Inhabited at least since Roman times, as evidenced by the finds, in the Middle Ages Arcade was a fief of the Collalto. After a period of bitter struggles, from the end of the fourteenth century it became part of the Republic of Venice. This was a time of economic prosperity, coinciding with the construction of numerous villas.

In the tumultuous period that saw the alternation of the French and Austrian administrations, it suffered numerous damages as it was the seat of military quarters. From the end of the nineteenth century, the poor rural economy forced many Arcadeans to emigrate to America, and then to France, Switzerland and Australia.

Located near the Piave front, the Great War was disastrous for the town, with a large number of victims, refugees and destruction. From October 1916 it was home to the Arcade airfield. The damage caused by the Second World War was also considerable.

In 1960 Arcade lost the three hamlets of Giavera, Cusignana and Santi Angeli which went to form the new municipality of Giavera del Montello.

== Demographic evolution ==
Historical population

Year	Pop.	±%
1861	?	—
1871	1,127	—
1881	1,277	+13.3%
1901	1,348	+5.6%
1911	1,830	+35.8%
1921	1,959	+7.0%

Year	Pop.	±%
1931	2,078	+6.1%
1936	2,012	−3.2%
1951	2,054	+2.1%
1961	2,144	+4.4%
1971	2,440	+13.8%
1981	2,806	+15.0%

Year	Pop.	±%
1991	3,119	+11.2%
2001	3,444	+10.4%
2011	4,366	+26.8%
2021	4,504	+3.2%

Source: Data from ISTAT

=== Foreign ethnicities and minorities ===
As of December 31, 2022, foreigners residents in the municipality were 422, i.e. 9.4% of the population. The largest groups are shown below:

1. Morocco 104
2. Romania 83
3. Kosovo 53
4. China 29
5. Albania 24

== Twin towns ==
- Bernières-sur-Mer, France, since 2011
