= Aiello del Friuli =

Aiello del Friuli Daèl (Friulian)
- Comune
- Comune di Aiello del Friuli
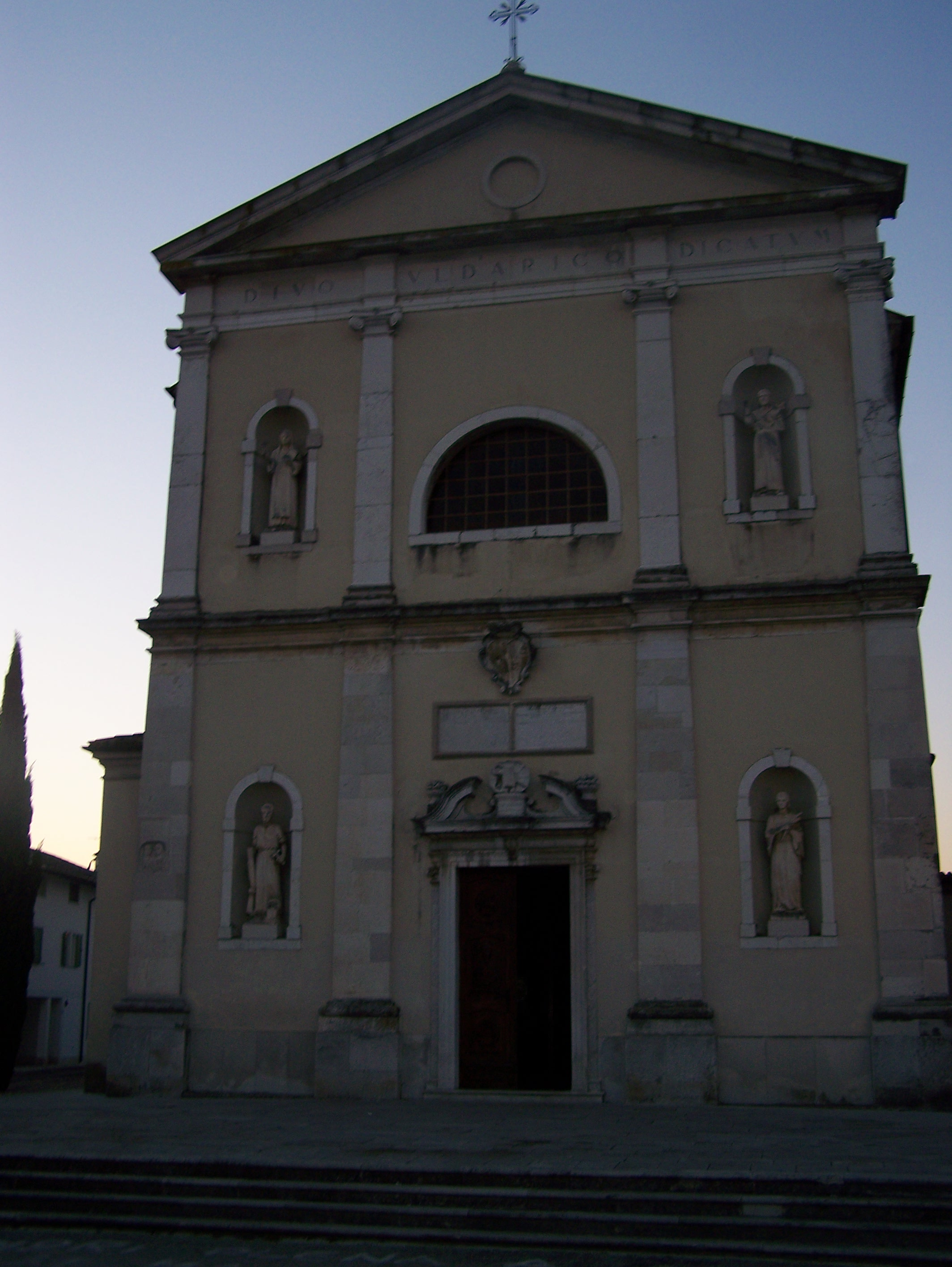
- The parish church of Saint Ulrich in Aiello

- Location of Aiello del Friuli in Italy Aiello del Friuli (Friuli-Venezia Giulia)
- Coordinates: 45°52′N 13°22′E
- Country: Italy
- Region: Friuli-Venezia Giulia
- Province: Udine (UD)
- Frazioni: Joannis

Government
  - Mayor: Roberto Festa (lista civica - Aiello Joannis uniti per il futuro)

Area
  - Total: 13.35 km^{2} (5.15 sq mi)
- Elevation: 18 m (59 ft)

Population (31 May 2025)
  - Total: 2,076
  - Density: 155.5/km^{2} (402.8/sq mi)
- Demonym: Aiellesi
- Time zone: UTC+1 (CET)
  - Summer (DST): UTC+2 (CEST)
- Postal code: 33041
- Dialing code: 0431
- Patron saint: St. Ulrich
- Saint day: July 4
- Website: Official website

Aiello del Friuli (Friulian: Daèl) is a comune (municipality) in the Regional decentralization entity of Udine in the Italian region of Friuli-Venezia Giulia, located about 45 kilometres (28 mi) northwest of Trieste and about 25 kilometres (16 mi) southeast of Udine. Next to the town of Aiello there is a single hamlet, Joannis (Uànis) which, until 1927, constituted an autonomous municipality, in addition to the localities of Novacco (Nauac) and Uttano (Utàn).

Aiello del Friuli borders the following municipalities: Bagnaria Arsa, Campolongo al Torre, Cervignano del Friuli, Ruda, San Vito al Torre, Visco.

== Monuments and places of interest ==
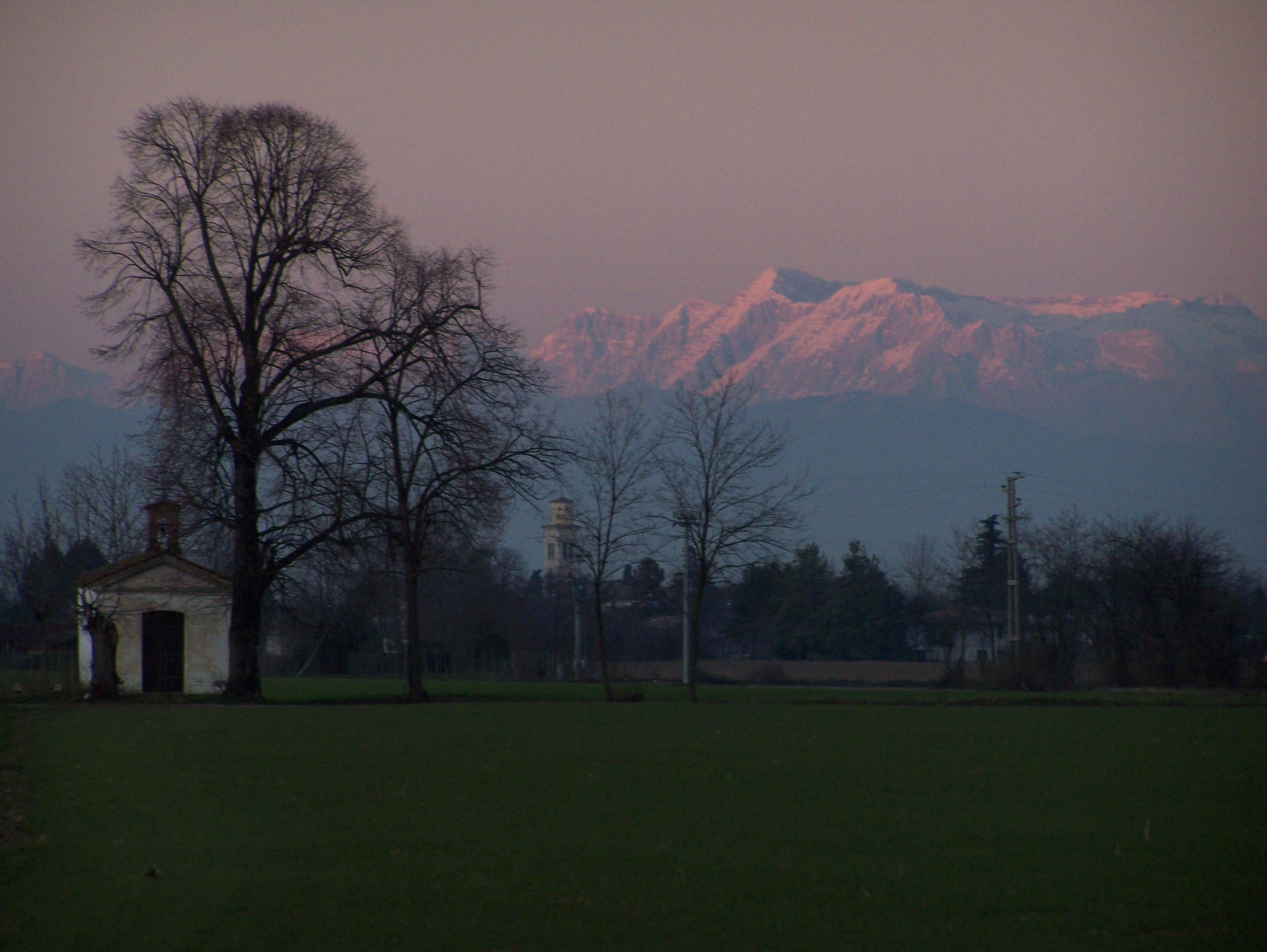
The church of the Madonna located in Colloredo, Aiello

=== Religious architecture ===
- Parish church of Sant'Ulderico: in operation since 1691, and has a façade decorated with pilasters and four niches containing as many statues; inside we find the spectacular dome, frescoed in 1900 by Clemente Delneri from Gorizia.
- Church of Sant'Agnese, located in the hamlet of Ioannis and built between 1742 and 1749.
- Convent complex of San Domenico, made up of the church, begun in 1716, the bell tower and the body of the convent, now used for residential purposes.
- Church of the Madonna located in Colloredo, Aiello.

Numerous chapels and votive altarpieces located inside and outside (in the fields) of the town. Among these of particular historical and artistic value are the chapel of the Madonna di Colloredo, the chapel from Crist and the chapel of San Nicolò (part of the original parish church of Aiello now located in the center of the Remembrance park for the fallen of all wars).

== Infrastructure and transport ==
Aiello is easily reachable from the A4 Venice-Trieste motorway (which passes through the municipal area) via the Palmanova exit, approximately 7 km away. 7 km away is also the other major center in the area, Cervignano del Friuli, with the train station on the Venice-Trieste railway line.

== Notable people ==
Joannis is the birthplace of Enzo Bearzot, former Italian football player and manager, who won the 1982 FIFA World Cup as coach.
