= Giavera del Montello =

- Comune
- Comune di Giavera del Montello
- Coat of arms

- Location within Italy Location within Veneto
- Coordinates: 45°48′N 12°10′E
- Country: Italy
- Region: Veneto
- Province: Treviso (TV)
- Frazioni: Cusignana, Santi Angeli

Government
  - Mayor: Maurizio Cavallin

Area
  - Total: 20.19 km^{2} (7.80 sq mi)
- Elevation: 78 m (256 ft)

Population (30 June 2023)
  - Total: 5,106
  - Density: 252.9/km^{2} (655.0/sq mi)
- Demonym: Giaveresi
- Time zone: UTC+1 (CET)
  - Summer (DST): UTC+2 (CEST)
- Postal code: 31040
- Dialing code: 0422
- Website: Official website

Giavera del Montello is a comune (municipality) in the Province of Treviso in the Italian region Veneto, located about 40 kilometres (25 mi) northwest of Venice and about 15 kilometres (9 mi) northwest of Treviso.

Giavera del Montello borders the following municipalities: Arcade, Nervesa della Battaglia, Povegliano, Sernaglia della Battaglia, Volpago del Montello.

== Origins of the name ==
The name Giavera is clearly linked to the stream of the same name. In turn, the hydronym would derive from the Latin glaber "smooth" or otherwise "world", in reference to the lands crossed or its waters.

== History ==
After the prehistoric settlements, as evidenced by various lithic finds and the remains of a human skeleton dating back 40,000 years ago in the Bus del Bo Pavei cave, the territory was inhabited first by the Euganeans and then by the Paleovenetians, before entering the Roman sphere of influence. In the Middle Ages it became a fief of the Collalto Counts around 990. Later, religious bodies, above all the Abbey and the Certosa, exercised influence over the whole of Montello. From the end of the fourteenth century. the Serenissima conquered the whole area: for centuries the oak woods were exploited by the Venetian Arsenal. In recent times, the Great War shocked the countries on the front: the battle of the Solstice (June 15–23, 1918) was decisive for Italy, which raged for a long time in the Valle dei Morti, near SS. Angels.

== Monuments and places of interest ==
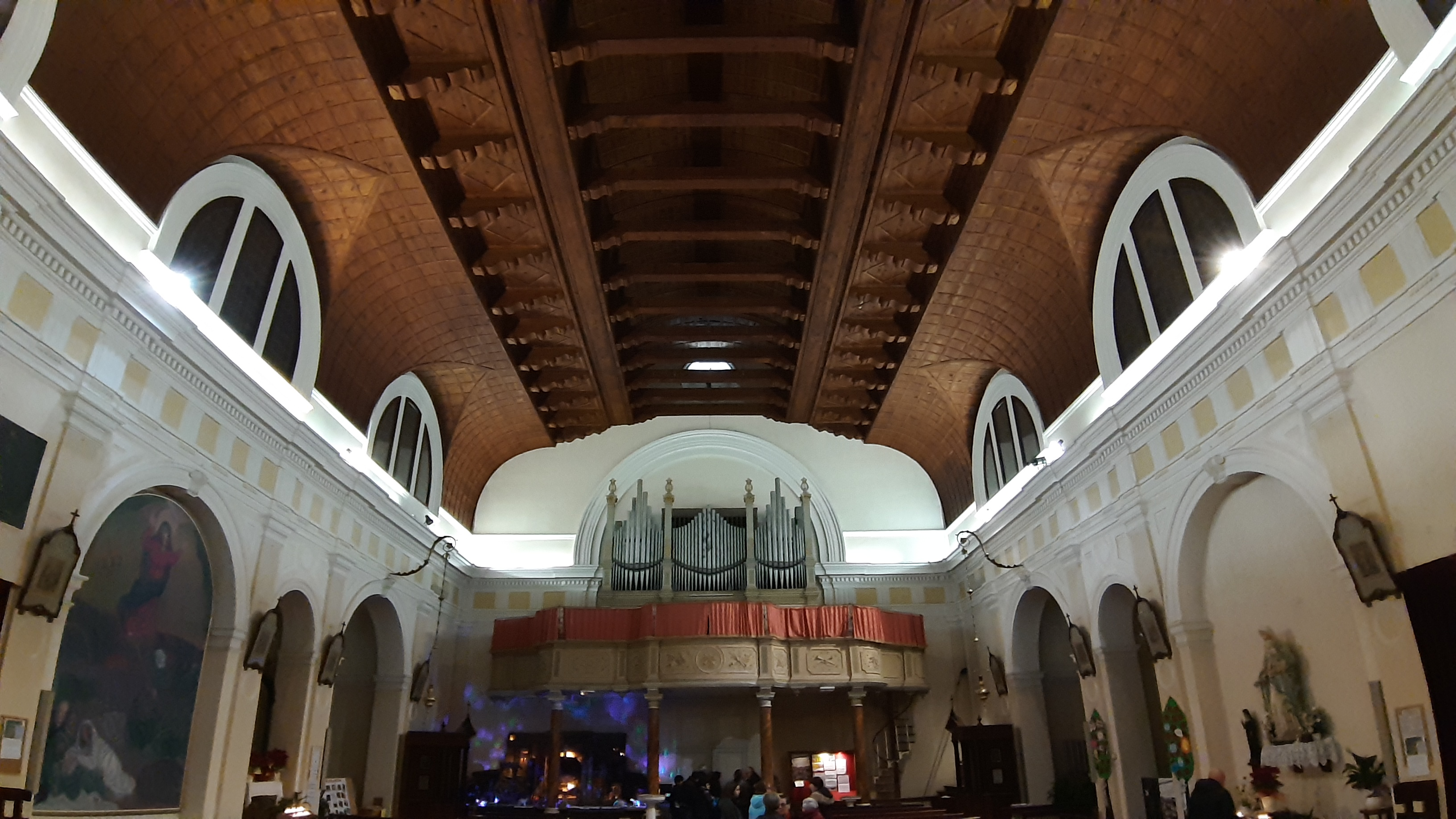
The interior of the church of Santa Maria Assunta, in Cusignana

- Casa Serena on hold n° 10 of Montello, during the Great War it was an Italian stronghold at the western end of the 'Linea della Corda', on which the Austrian impact broke in the first days of the Battle of the Solstice (15-23 June 1918).
- Casa Cattai, took its name from the homonymous family who served the parish priest of Cusignana.
- Giavera British Cemetery, the English military cemetery, completed in 1921, adjacent to the municipal cemetery.
- Church of Santa Maria Assunta, in Cusignana

=== Venetian villas ===
Below is a list of the Venetian villas in the municipal area of Giavera:

- Villa Letizia Wassermann
- Villa Manin Morassi called La Provvederia
- Villa Rinaldi - Giavera del Montello
- Villa Tiretta Agostini
- Villa Zanatta Vianello Uria Polles Corletto

== Economy ==
The primary sector is specialized in the production of mushrooms, honey and above all wine (Prosecco Doc, Asolo Prosecco Docg, Pinot Grigio, Chardonnay, Merlot and Cabernet). Livestock breeding is active for the production of milk (Latteria Montello) and cheeses with an important company present in the area, Nonno Nanni. In the garden of the Giavera del Montello plant, a statue was created to represent the work of the Lazzarin family with the image of milk in motion, like a drop that descends and then rises again and in the spring of 2012 the white Cansiglio stone was purchased on which the evolution of milk was then sculpted.

The other industrial activities concern the production of furniture, footwear, sportswear and food products. Flourishing craftsmanship: over 170 companies active in various sectors (carpentry, construction, metalworking); catering is also very present. The town is home to Tecnica group headquarters.

== Demographic evolution ==
Historical population

Year	Pop.	±%
1861	?	—
1871	2,242	—
1881	2,541	+13.3%
1901	2,853	+12.3%
1911	3,627	+27.1%
1921	4,047	+11.6%

Year	Pop.	±%
1931	3,811	−5.8%
1936	3,595	−5.7%
1951	3,684	+2.5%
1961	3,391	−8.0%
1971	3,384	−0.2%
1981	3,668	+8.4%

Year	Pop.	±%
1991	3,806	+3.8%
2001	4,318	+13.5%
2011	5,144	+19.1%
2021	5,167	+0.4%

Source: Data from ISTAT

=== Foreign ethnicities and minorities ===
As of December 31, 2022, foreigners residents in the municipality were 414, i.e. 8.1% of the population. The largest groups are shown below:

1. Romania 114
2. Morocco 65
3. Albania 32
4. China 30
5. Kosovo 29

== Sport ==
The Giavera del Montello Municipal Stadium hosts the football team Giavera Calcio. It is former significant motorcycle speedway venue, which held qualifying rounds of the Speedway World Championship in 1979 and 1980 and a semi-final round of the Speedway World Pairs Championship in 1981.
