= Medal of Military Valor =

Italian military award

| Gold Medal | Silver Medal (Republic of Italy) | Bronze Medal |

Gold Medal

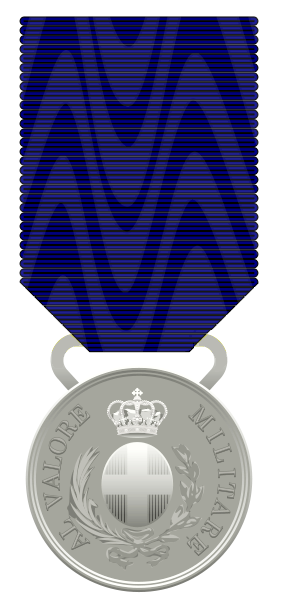
Silver Medal (Kingdom of Italy)

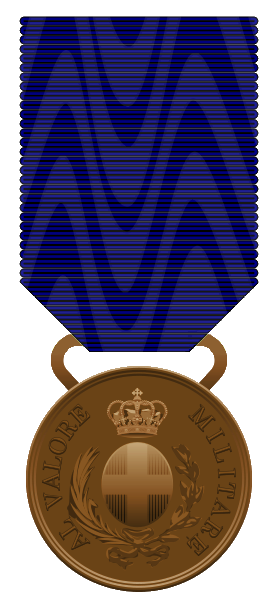
Bronze Medal

War Cross
of Military Valor

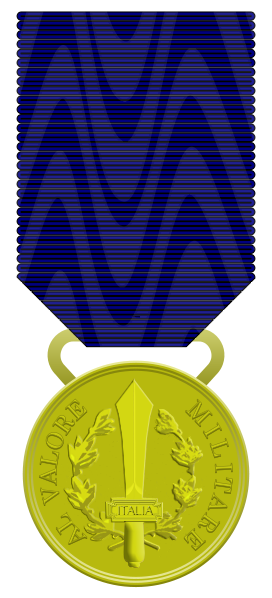
Gold Medal, Italian Social Republic, 1943-45

The Medal of Military Valor (Italian language: Medaglia al valor militare) is an Italian medal, originally established as a Sardinian award. It is awarded to military personnel, units above the level of company, and civilians for exceptional valor in the face of the enemy.

The medal has three levels:

- The Gold Medal of Military Valor, established on 21 May 1793 by King Victor Amadeus III of Sardinia.
- The Silver Medal of Military Valor, established on 21 May 1793 by King Victor Amadeus III of Sardinia.
- The Bronze Medal of Military Valor, established in 1887 by King Umberto I of Italy.
- Below the medal, the War Cross of Military Valor is awarded, established in 1922 by King Victor Emmanuel III.

== Description ==
All three levels have the same design:
Obverse: Up to 1946, a wreath containing the arms of the House of Savoy surmounted by a Crown, surrounded by the inscription "AL VALORE MILITARE". Awards of the Republic of Italy replace the arms of Savoy with the emblem of Italy. A version was also produced by the Italian Social Republic in 1943 in which the central arms are replaced by a Gladius.
Reverse: A laurel wreath. The name of the recipient is sometimes engraved within the wreath.
Ribbon: Bright blue moire for all levels.
Each medal can be earned several times by the same recipient, entitling them to wear two or more identical medals, although from 1915 to 1922 the gold and silver medals could only be awarded three times to any one man, any further act of bravery being rewarded by a promotion.

== Award history ==
Originally an award of the Kingdom of Sardinia, it became an Italian decoration on the creation of the Kingdom of Italy in 1861, being also used by the Italian Social Republic between 1943 and 1945. It is a now awarded by the Republic of Italy.

The award began as the Order of Military Valor established by Victor Amadeus III in 1793. Falling into disuse during the Napoleonic era, it was revived on 1 April 1815 by Victor Emmanuel I. Emmanuel I repealed the institution a few months later, on 4 August 1815, replacing the medals for bravery with the Military Order of Savoy.

In 1833, King Charles Albert acknowledged that the requirements for the grant of the Military Order were too strict, and re-established medals for valor in gold and silver to reward selfless acts in war and in peace by the military.

The medal was awarded for the Crimean War, the reverse inscribed "Spedizione d'Oriente 1854-1856" outside the wreath. Awards of this medal in silver included to 450 officers and men of the allied British Royal Navy and Army.

In 1887 the medal in bronze was authorised by King Umberto I. Soldiers who had received honourable mentions (menzioni onorevoli) for bravery between 1848 and 1887 were granted the bronze medal, and from this date it was awarded to those whose acts of bravery did not justify the higher gold or silver levels.

During the First World War a total of 368 Gold, 38,614 Silver and 60,244 Bronze medals were awarded for individual acts of heroism. In 1916 Tsar Nicholas II of Russia was awarded the Medal of Military Valor in Gold, the only foreign head of state to receive this award.

Royal Decree #1423 of 4 November 1932 defined new rules for granting the Valor medals, as well as the War Cross for Military Valor and the Cross of Merit of War. In the text of the decree, Articles 1 and 3 define the areas of basic and primary application for the grant of these honors. Article 1 states:

The decoration for military valor was established to celebrate acts of military heroism, mark the recipients as worthy of public honor, and create a spirit of emulation in belonging to the military forces.

While Article 3 provides that:

Decorations for Valor are awarded to those who commit an act of bravery above the requirements of duty and honor, showing remarkable courage and initiative, at serious and manifest personal risk in war. The award of such decorations can be made, however, only when the act is such that it can in every respect be an example worthy of emulation.

The full text of Royal Decree was published in the Gazzetta Ufficiale 12 November 1932, #261.

Nominations for the medal, except in exceptional cases provided for in time of war, are scrutinized by a special military commission.

The award is intended for the military (individuals or entire military units, not below Company level), former partisan combatants, municipalities, provinces, and individual citizens.

== Types ==
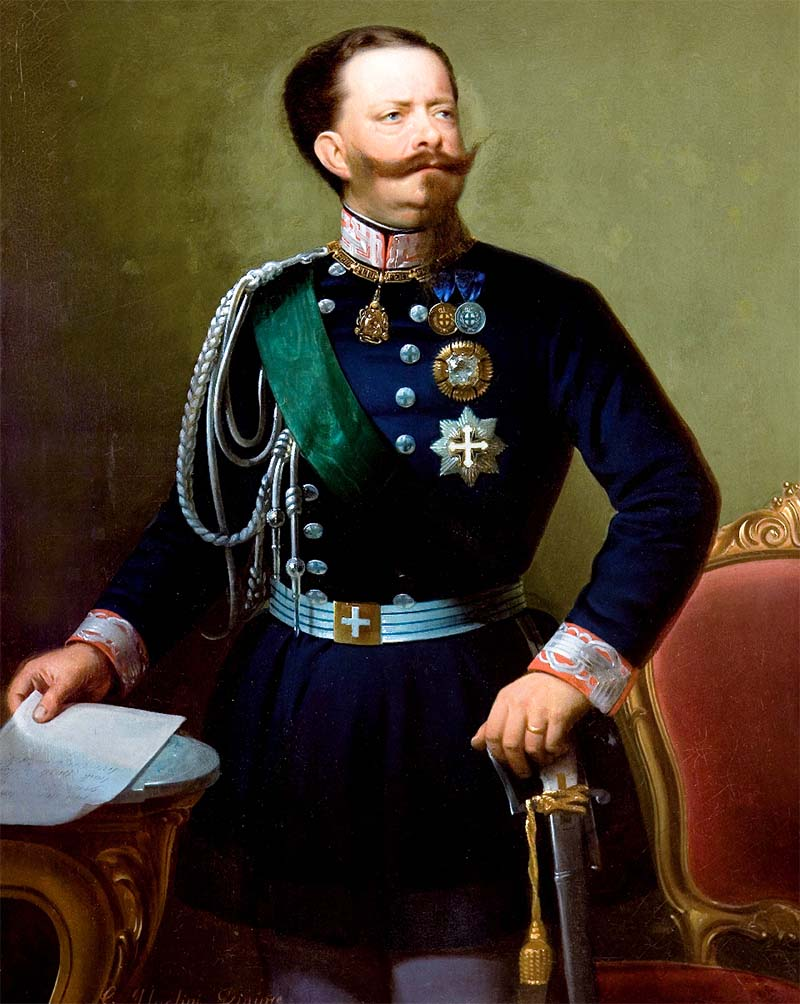
Victor Emmanuel II wearing gold and silver Medals of Military Valor

Decorations of Valor are divided into the following classes:

Gold Medal of Military Valor (26 March 1833 – 10 May 1943)
Gold Medal of Military Valor (10 May 1943 – Present)
Silver Medal of Military Valor (26 March 1833 – Present)
Bronze Medal of Military Valor (8 December 1887 – 10 May 1943)
Bronze Medal of Military Valor (10 May 1943 – Present)
War Cross of Military Valor (7 January 1922 – 10 May 1943)
War Cross of Military Valor (10 May 1943 – Present)

Gold Medal of Army Valor
Silver Medal of Army Valor
Bronze Medal of Army Valor

Gold Medal of Navy Valor
Silver Medal of Navy Valor
Bronze Medal of Navy Valor

Gold Medal of Aeronautic Valor
Silver Medal of Aeronautic Valor
Bronze Medal of Aeronautic Valor

Gold Medal of Carabinieri Valor
Silver Medal of Carabinieri Valor
Bronze Medal of Carabinieri Valor

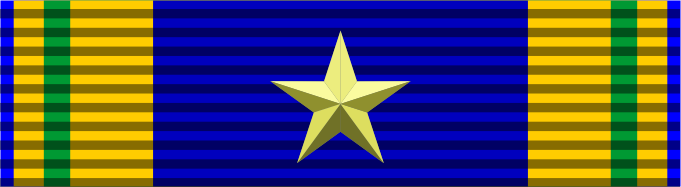
Gold Medal of Guardia di Finanza Valor
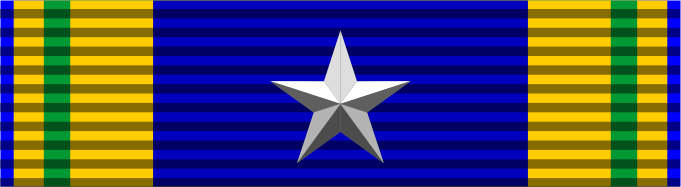
Silver Medal of Guardia di Finanza Valor
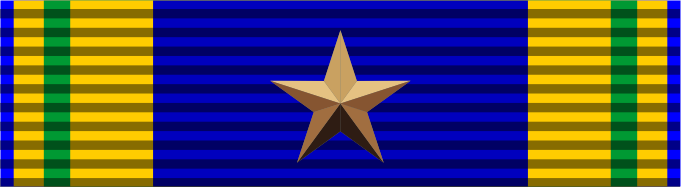
Bronze Medal of Guardia di Finanza Valor

=== Medals of Merit ===
Gold Cross of Army Merit
Silver Cross of Army Merit
Bronze Cross of Army Merit

Gold Cross of Navy Merit
Silver Cross of Navy Merit
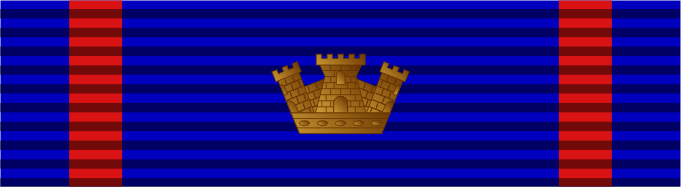
Bronze Cross of Navy Merit

Gold Cross of Aeronautic Merit
Silver Cross of Aeronautic Merit
Bronze Cross of Aeronautic Merit

Gold Cross of Carabinieri Merit
Silver Cross of Carabinieri Merit
Bronze Cross of Carabinieri Merit

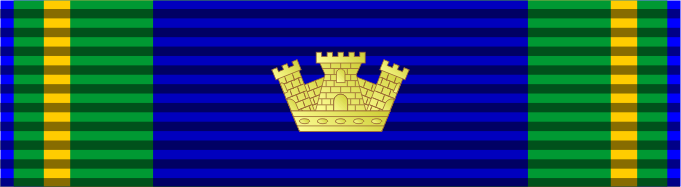
Gold Cross of Guardia di Finanza Merit
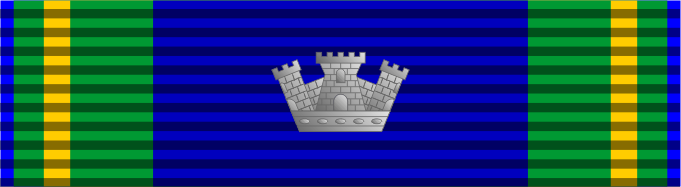
Silver Cross of Guardia di Finanza Merit
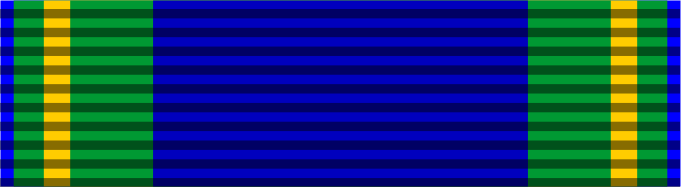
Bronze Cross of Guardia di Finanza Merit

War Merit Cross - Second award
War Merit Cross
