= List of World War I flying aces from Argentina =

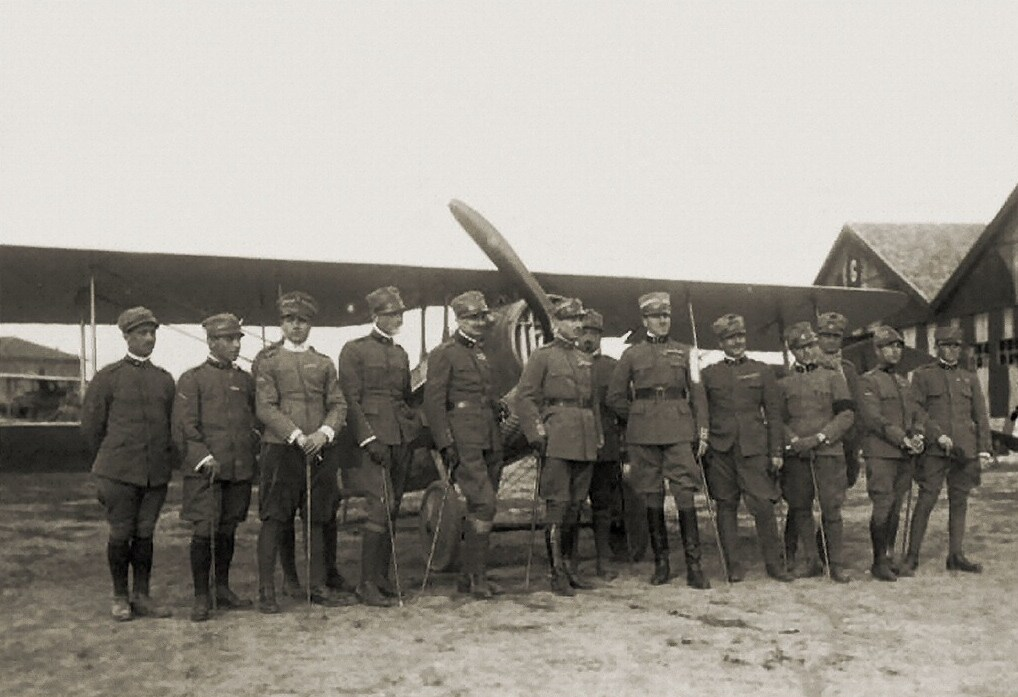
Pilots of the 91st Squadriglia. From left: Sgt. Mario D'Urso, Sgt. Gaetano Aliperta, Lt. Gastone Novelli, Lt. Cesare Magistrini, Capt. Bartolomeo Costantini, Capt. Fulco Ruffo di Calabria, Col. Pier Ruggero Piccio, Lt. Guido Keller, Maj. Francesco Baracca, Lt. Ferruccio Ranza, Lt. Mario De Bernardi, Lt. Adriano Bacula, Sgt. Guido Nardini, 2ndLt. Eduardo Alfredo Olivero.

This is a list of World War I flying aces from Argentina:

- Captain Alexander Beck, 11 victories scored in Royal Aircraft Factory SE.5s, served in the Royal Flying Corps and its successor, the Royal Air Force.
- Captain Thomas Colvill-Jones, 11 victories scored in Bristol F.2 Fighters, served in the Royal Flying Corps.
- Sottotenente Eduardo Alfredo Olivero, 9 victories while flying for 91a Squadriglia of Corpo Aeronautico Militare.
- Lieutenant Bertram Hutchinson Smyth, 8 victories while flying as a gunner in Bristol F.2 Fighters, served in the RAF.
- Lieutenant Thomas Traill, 8 victories scored piloting Bristol F.2 Fighters in the RAF.

== See also ==
- No. 164 Squadron RAF
