= Giorgio Pessi =

Italian flying ace

Giorgio Pessi (alias Giuliano Parvis)
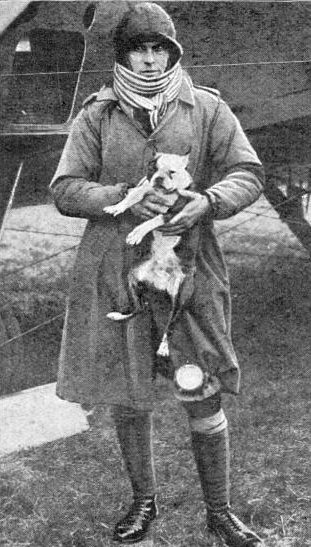
- Giorgio Pessi circa 1919
- Born: 17 November 1891; Trieste, Austro-Hungary
- Died: 18 July 1933 (aged 41); Lost at sea
- Military career
- Allegiance: Italy
- Branch: Aviation
- Rank: Tenente
- Units: 78a Squadriglia, 82a Squadriglia, 91a Squadriglia
- Awards: 2 Silver awards of Medal for Military Valor, French Croix de Guerre

Tenente Giorgio Pessi (alias Giuliano Parvis) (17 November 1891 – 18 July 1933) was a World War I flying ace born in Austria-Hungary who chose to fly for Italy. He was credited with six aerial victories.

== Early life and service ==
Giorgio Pessi was born on 17 November 1891 in Trieste, when it was part of the Austro-Hungarian Empire. He attended the local technical high school before studying engineering in Vienna and architecture in Munich. After World War I began, he fled to Venice in January 1915. When Italy finally entered World War I, Pessi volunteered to serve as a Sottotenente in the 2nd Cavalry Regiment of the Italian army.

== World War I aerial service ==
Pessi transferred to aviation service. On 10 October 1916, he received his advanced pilot's license, having qualified on Nieuport 10s at Malpensa. He was retained there as an instructor until May 1917. On 3 May 1917, Pessi adopted the nom de guerre of Giuliano Parvis; he wanted to avoid repercussions from the vengeful Austro-Hungarians who considered him traitorous. Pessi then completed gunnery school at San Giusto. On 25 May 1917, he was posted to command of 82a Squadriglia despite his inexperience. On 13 June, he transferred to the 78a Squadriglia. The following month, he transferred to 91a Squadriglia. He would fly a Spad VII fighter emblazoned with his personal marking of a crescent moon.

Pessi scored his first aerial victory on 2 August 1917. He staked his eighth claim on 23 November 1917. All of his claims were for victories shared with such aces as Ferruccio Ranza, Giovanni Sabelli, and Francesco Baracca. He served with 91a Squadriglia until 16 March 1918. He was then transferred to the General Commissariat of the air force. It seems probable he upgraded his pilot's training in the next several months, as he arrived in the United States on 20 August 1918 as a Caproni Ca.5 pilot and saw out war's end there. The Caproni he brought to the United States was characterized as the world's largest flying machine.

== Post World War I service ==
On 1 February 1919, the evaluation committee of the aviation military intelligence section released its list of victory confirmations for Italian pilots. Giorgio Pessi was credited with six aerial victories. One of the denials was for a 6 November 1917 claim where the Austro-Hungarian victim had fallen within his own lines; it was later proven that ace Rudolf Szepessy-Sokoll had died in that crash. Also in 1919, Pessi flew the Caproni Ca.5 heavy bomber under the Brooklyn Bridge.

By 1922, Pessi had returned from America and set up a flying school in Anatolia, Turkey. In 1926, he joined Aero Expresso Italiana as its manager of the Brindisi to Istanbul line. On 18 July 1933, Pessi was flying this route, aboard Dornier Wal serial I-AZEE, when he disappeared on an overwater approach to Rhodes.

== Legacy ==
Rhodes Maritsa Airport (Greek: Αερολιμένας Ρόδου - Μαριτσών) (IATA: LGRD) is a military airport located on the island of Rhodes in Greece. The airport is located 14 km south west of the capital city of Rhodes, near the village of Maritsa, and 3 km south of the new Rhodes International Airport.

The airport was built in 1938 during the Italian occupation of the Dodecanese as a base for the Regia Aeronautica and was called Aeroporto di Martisa "G.Pessi Parvis" and its Italian airport code was 801.

== Honors and awards ==
- Two Silver awards of the Medal for Military Valor: Autumn 1917
- French Croix de Guerre
- Serbian Gold Medal
