= Fulco Ruffo di Calabria =

Prince Fulco Ruffo di Calabria
- 6th Duke of Guardia Lombarda
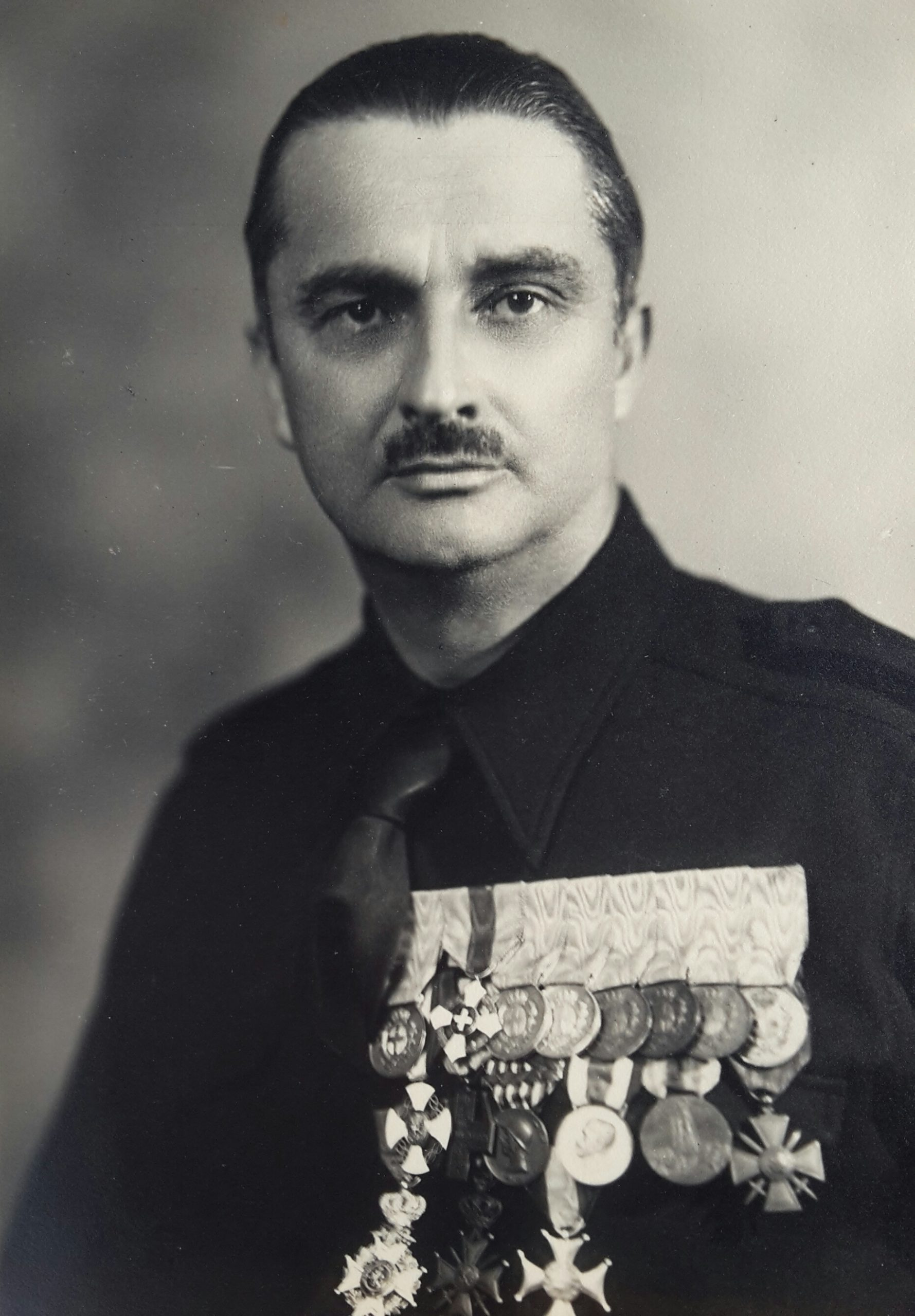
- Fulco c. 1917
- Born: 12 August 1884; Naples, Kingdom of Italy
- Died: 23 August 1946 (aged 62); Marina di Massa, Italy
- Spouse: Luisa Gazelli dei Conti di Rossana (m. 1919)
- Issue: Donna Maria Cristina; Donna Laura; Prince Fabrizio, 7th Duke of Guardia Lombarda; Don Augusto; Donna Giovannella; Don Antonello; Paola, Queen of the Belgians
- House: Ruffo di Calabria
- Father: Fulco Beniamino Tristano Ruffo di Calabria, 5th Duke of Guardia Lombarda
- Mother: Laura Mosselman du Chenoy

Member of the Senate of the Kingdom
- In office 6 April 1934 – 12 July 1944
- Appointed by: Victor Emmanuel III

Fulco VIII, Prince Ruffo di Calabria, 6th Duke of Guardia Lombarda (12 August 1884 – 23 August 1946) was an Italian World War I flying ace and senator of the Kingdom from 1934 until his death. He was the father of Paola, Queen of the Belgians (born Donna Paola Ruffo di Calabria).

== Family history ==
Ademarus Rufus, who died in 1049, held the title of Comes in southern Italy. Siggerio Ruffo became Holy Roman Emperor Frederick II's grand marshal of the Kingdom of Sicily in 1235. After the 14th century, the family divided into two branches Ruffo di Scaletta and the Ruffo di Calabria, the latter to which Fulco belonged.

Fulco was the son of Fulco VII Beniamino Tristano Ruffo di Calabria, 5th Duke of Guardia Lombarda, and Laura Mosselman du Chenoy, a Belgian aristocrat, whose maternal grandfather was Count Jacques André Coghen, Belgium's second finance minister. Beniamino Ruffo di Calabria was the younger brother of the head of the House of Ruffo, Fulco Ruffo di Calabria-Santapau, 10th Principe di Scilla and 2nd Duca di Santa Cristina.

Fulco was made, by decree of 15 March 1928, Prince Ruffo di Calabria, in the Kingdom of Italy. By inheritance, he was also the 6th Duke of Guardia Lombarda and 17th Count of Sinopoli. The Calabrian branch of the House of Ruffo represents one of the most ancient lineages of Italy and includes many notable personages, such as Cardinal Fabrizio Dionigi Ruffo. Fulco was related to historically eminent Roman and southern Italian noble families, including the Colonna, Orsini, Pallavicini, Alliata and Rospigliosi.

== Early life and prewar military service ==
Fulco Ruffo di Calabria was born in Naples, Kingdom of Italy, on 12 August 1884. He volunteered as a reserve officer training with the 11th Foggia Light Cavalry Regiment on 22 November 1904. On 31 May 1905, he was promoted to Corporal; on 30 November, he was again promoted, to Sergente. On 20 February 1906, he was commissioned into officers' ranks as a Second lieutenant.

Subsequently, he became deputy director of the Belgian Wegimont shipping company's African station. He returned from Africa as World War I broke out.

== World War I service ==
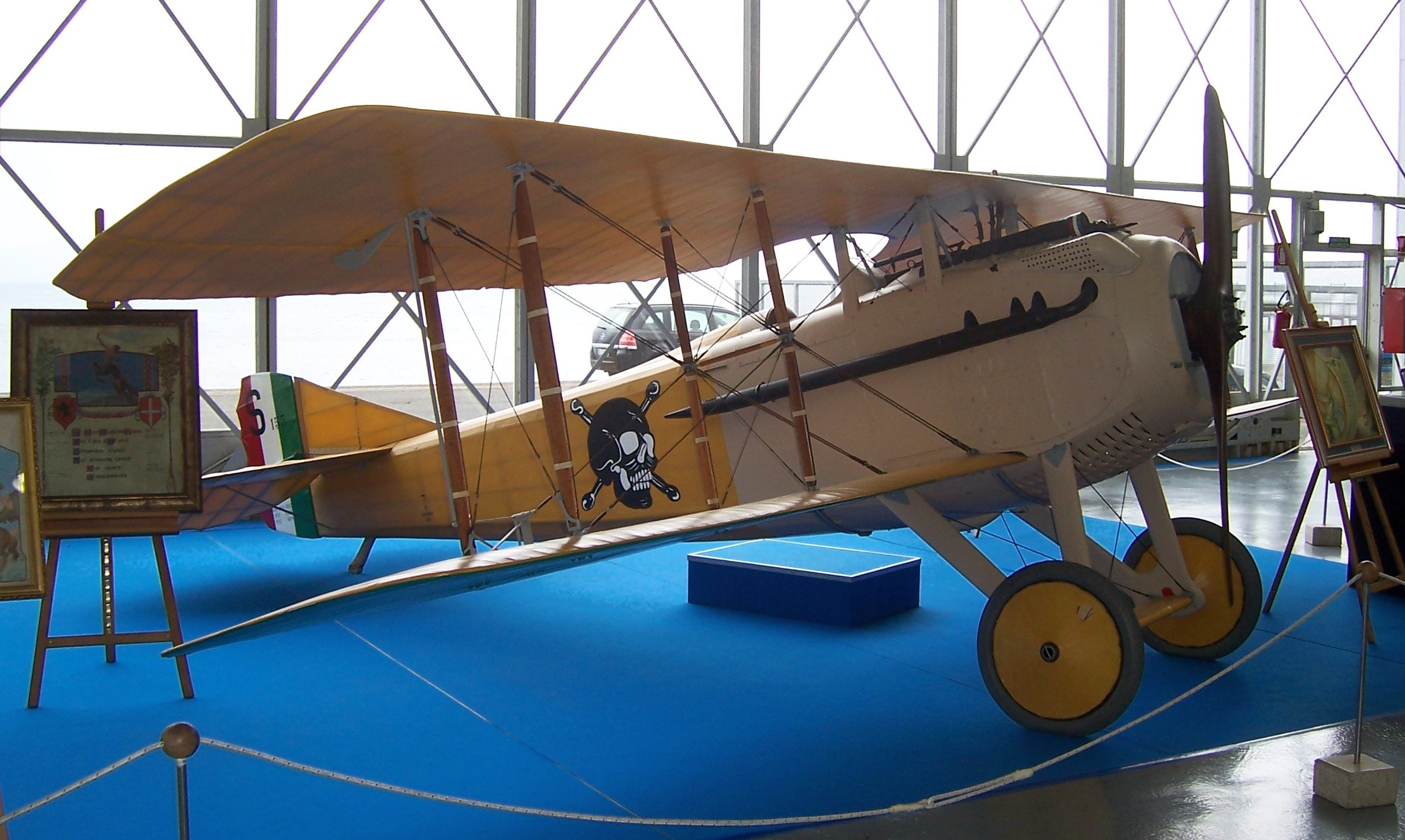
Ruffo di Calabria's SPAD V.II

Ruffo di Calabria returned to military duty before Italy's entry into World War I, and was assigned to the Battaglione Aviatori (which later became the Corpo Aeronautico Militare) on 20 December 1914. After pilot training, on 28 September 1915 he was posted to the 4a Squadriglia Artiglia, an artillery coordination unit that later morphed into 44a Squadriglia. On 26 January 1916, he moved to 2a Squadriglia (later 42a Squadriglia). He won two Bronze awards of the Medal for Military Valor—in February and April 1916—while still a two-seater pilot with them. His personal emblem was a black skull and crossbones painted on the fuselage of his plane, whether it was his original Nieuport 11s, or his later Nieuport 17 and SPAD VII airplanes.

Ruffo di Calabria underwent further training on Nieuports at Cascina Costa in May 1916. On 26 June, (Note: Note: The text of Above the War Fronts gives this as the date he joined 70a Squadriglia; however, the victory list on the same page shows Ruffo di Calabria scoring his wins for 1a Squadriglia, as does Nieuport Aces.) he was assigned to 1a Squadriglia as a fighter pilot. He won his first victory there, shared with Francesco Baracca on 23 August 1916, and had a second one go unconfirmed. His performance was good for a Silver Medal for Military Valor in August, followed by a Bronze in September 1916.

By 16 September, when he shared a victory with Baracca and Luigi Olivari, he was scoring for his new unit, 70a Squadriglia. He ran his score with them to four confirmed and four unconfirmed by 28 February 1917.

In March 1917, he was transferred out of the reserves when he was promoted to Tenente. In May he then switched to flying a Nieuport for 91a Squadriglia. He was awarded both a Silver and a Bronze Medal for Military Valor that same month. His promotion to Capitano came through in August 1917. By that time, his confirmed victories totalled 13. He ended 1917 with his total victories at 16.

Ruffo di Calabria's records for 1918 are incomplete, but they credit him with four more victories. On 5 May 1918, he was granted the ultimate Medal of Military Valor, the Gold award. After Baracca's death on 19 June 1918, Fulco assumed command of the renowned "Squadron of Aces". He relinquished command of 91a Squadriglia on 18 September to Ferruccio Ranza, after suffering a nervous breakdown. After recovering, on 23 October 1918 he was given command of 10th Gruppo, but was shot down by artillery fire near Marano on 29 October 1918. In the end, he shot down twenty enemy airplanes in 53 combats, making him the fifth highest scoring Italian flying ace of World War I.

== Post-World War I ==
On 1 February 1919, the Bongiovanni commission's military intelligence report verified all twenty of Ruffo di Calabria's confirmed victories, although still denying the five that were unconfirmed. Ruffo di Calabria retained his military commission, although without a posting. By 1925, his main activity was the management of his family estates located near Paliano.

In 1934, he was named senator of the kingdom by King Victor Emmanuel III. He also continued in the military, eventually rising to the rank of Tenente Colonello in 1942. Ruffo di Calabria served in the Italian senate until 1944.

For this reason, in the immediate post-war period, Ruffo di Calabria was referred to the High Court of Justice for Sanctions against Fascism. However, the request for his dismissal was rejected by the Court, due to Ruffo establishing his aversion to fascism. His two sons Fabrizio and Augusto had served as partisans and were engaged in the Marche at the time of the Allies breaking through the Gustav Line, and his son Augusto had died at sea off Pescara while taking part in a joint action with the Allies on the night of 2/3 November 1943.

Fulco Ruffo di Calabria died in Ronchi di Apuania, Italy, on 23 August 1946.

== Awards ==
=== Italian awards ===
- Knight of the Military Order of Savoy ‑ R.D. 10 September 1918
- Gold Medal of Military Valour ‑ D.L. 5 May 1918
- Silver Medal of Military Valor ‑ D.L. 15 March 1917
- Silver Medal of Military Valor (combat merit on the field) - D.L. 20 January 1918
- Bronze Medal of Military Valor ‑ D.L. 15 October 1916
- Bronze Medal of Military Valor ‑ D.L. 24 May 1917
- Bronze Medal of Military Valor - D.L. 10 June 1917.
- Bronze Medal of Military Valor‑ D.L. 16 June 1917
- War Merit Cross - 1918
- Badge for the war effort (with four service stars) - R.D. 21 May 1916
- Commemorative medal of the Italian–Austrian war of 1915–1918 (with four service stars) - (R.D. 29 July 1920)
- Italian World War I Victory Medal - (R.D. 29 July 1920)
- Commemorative Medal for the Unification of Italy (R.D. 19 October 1922)
- Order of the Crown of Italy
  - Commander (30 November 1939)
  - Officer (22 December 1938)
  - Knight (29 January 1929)

=== International awards ===
- Knight of the Order of Leopold - Belgium
- Belgian Croix de guerre - 10 March 1917

== Personal life and descendants ==
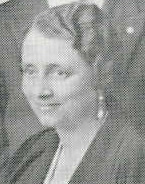
Luisa Albertina Christina Giovanna Gazelli dei Conti di Rossana

On 30 June 1919, Ruffi di Calabria married, in Turin, Donna Luisa Albertina Christina Giovanna Gazelli dei Conti di Rossana e di San Sebastiano (1896–1989), the daughter of Augusto Gazelli dei Conti di Rossana e di San Sebastiano, and his wife, Maria Cristina dei Conti Rignon. Luisa served as a lady-in-waiting to Queen Elena of Italy.

They had seven children:

  - Maria Cristina Ruffo di Calabria (1920–2003);
    married Casimiro San Martino d´Aglie dei Marchesi di San Germano in 1940 :
    - Emanuela San Martino d'Agliè;
      married 1962 Count Ernesto Rossi di Montelera (born 1938) :
      - Lidia Rossi di Montelera (born 1963); married 1990 Count Alexander zu Trauttmansdorff-Weinsberg.
      - Maria Cristina Rossi di Montelera (born 1965); married 1994 Baron Hans-Ulrich von Freyberg-Eisenberg-Allmendingen.
      - Ginevra Rossi di Montelera (born 1967).
      - Antonella Rossi di Montelera (born 1970); married 2003 Count Alois von Waldburg-Zeil.
    - Antonella San Martino d'Agliè; married 1970 Count Ippolito Calvi di Bergolo Rocca Saporiti.
    - Giovanna San Martino d'Aglie (born 10 April 1945, Campiglione); married 24 May 1974 Campiglione, Italy, Don Alvaro de Orléans-Borbón y Parodi Delfino (son of Infante Alvaro de Orléans-Borbón, Duke of Galliera), divorced with issue in ?
    - Nicolo San Martino d'Aglie (born 3 July 1948, Campiglione); married 4 June 1974 Princess Catherine Napoléon (daughter of Louis, Prince Napoléon), divorced without issue in 1982.
    - Filippo San Martino d'Agile di San Germano (born 24 Septembre 1953, Torino); married 16 November 1984 Cristina Maria Margherita Flesia.
  - Laura Ruffo di Calabria (1921–1972);
    married Bettino, Baron Ricasoli Firidolfi (31st Baron of Brolio) in 1946: four children (Andrea [d. circa 1974], Luisa, Maria Teresa, Francesco, 32nd Baron of Brolio).
  - Fabrizio, Prince Ruffo di Calabria-Santapau (1922–2005); head of the House of Ruffo from 1975:
    13th Prince of Palazzolo, 14th Prince of Scilla, 7th Duke of Guardia Lombarda, 13th Marquis of Scilla and 18th Count of Sinopoli:
    his first marriage to Maria Vaciago, had :
    - Don Fulco IX, Prince Ruffo di Calabria (born 29 July 1954); current head of the House of Ruffo di Calabria, married and divorced Melba Vincens Bello; married secondly, in 2005, Luisa Tricarico.
    - Augusto Ruffo di Calabria (born 1 October 1955); married Princess Christiana zu Windisch-Graetz in 1980 with issue.
    - Imara Ruffo di Calabria (born 7 July 1958); married firstly Uberto Imar Gashe (grandson of Princess Yolanda of Savoy) in 1986; married secondly Baron Marco Tonci Ottieri della Ciaia in 1993.
    - Umberto Ruffo di Calabria (born 23 October 1960); married Leontina, Marchesa Pallavicini in 1987.
    - Don Alessandro Ruffo di Calabria (born 4 November 1964); married Princess Mafalda of Savoy-Aosta in 1994, divorced without issue in 2000.
  - Augusto Ruffo di Calabria (1925–1943); killed in battle at sea on 2 November 1943 near Pescara.
  - Giovannella Ruffo di Calabria (1927–1941).
  - Antonello Ruffo di Calabria (1930–2017);
    married Rosa Maria Mastrogiovanni Tasca in 1961.
    - Covella Ruffo di Calabria (born 4 February 1962, Rome).
    - Lucio Ruffo di Calabria (born 14 April 1964, Rome).
    - Domitilla Ruffo di Calabria (1965-2025); married 16 July 1990 Don Giovanni dei Baroni Porcari Li Destri.
    - Claudia Ruffo di Calabria (born 30 August 1969, Rome); married 27 May 1989 Marcello Salom.
  - Paola Ruffo di Calabria (born 1937); Queen consort of the Belgians:
    married to Albert II, King of the Belgians (then Prince of Liège) in 1959.
    - Philippe, King of the Belgians;
      Married to Mathilde, Countess d'Udekem d'Acoz, four children.

== Ancestry ==
Ancestors of Fulco Ruffo di Calabria

16. Fulco IV, Prince Ruffo di Calabria, Duke di Guardia Lombarda
8. Fulco V, Prince Ruffo di Calabria
17. Carlotta della Leonessa
4. Fulco VI, Prince Ruffo di Calabria
18. Fabrizio Alliata-Colonna, Principe di Villafranca
9. Maria Felicita dei Principi Alliata-Colonna
19. Maria Giuseppa Moncada dei Principi di Paternò
2. Fulco VII Beniamino Tristano, Prince Ruffo di Calabria, 5th Duke di Guardia Lombarda
20. Niccolò Galletti, Marchese di San Cataldo, Principe di Fiumesalato
10. Salvatore Galletti, Marchese di San Cataldo, Principe di Fiumesalato
21. Eleanora Oneto dei Duchi di Sperlinga
5. Eleonora Galletti dei Marchesi di San Cataldo
22. Baldassare Platamone, Duca di Cannizzaro
11. Concetta Platamone dei Principi di Rosolini
23. Rosalia Moncada dei Principi di Larderia
1. Fulco VIII, Prince Ruffo di Calabria
24. Jacob Mosselman
12. Cornelis Mosselman
24. Barbara 't Kind
6. Baron Théodore Mosselman du Chenoy
26. Jacob Muts
13. Petronelle Muts
27. Clara Adriana Jamez
3. Laura Mosselmann du Chenoy
28. Joseph Coghen
14. Count Jacques-André Coghen
29. Isabelle Stielemans
7. Isabelle Coghen
30. François Rittweger
15. Caroline Rittweger
31. Anne Catherine Sauvage
