= Giovanni Sabelli =

Italian flying ace (1886–1917)

- Born: 23 September 1886; Naples, Kingdom of Italy
- Died: 25 October 1917 (aged 31); Bainsizza, Austria-Hungary
- Military career
- Allegiance: Italy
- Branch: Aviation
- Rank: Tenente
- Nickname: Il Bulgaro
- Units: Sez Dif Albania, 2a Squadriglia Caccia/71a Squadriglia, 91a Squadriglia Aviatik
- Awards: 2 awards of Silver Medal of Military Valor

Tenente Giovanni Sabelli (23 September 1886 – 25 October 1917) was an Italian World War I flying ace credited with five aerial victories. At the start of World War I, he was already an experienced combat pilot.

== Early life ==
On 23 September 1886 in Naples, Sabelli was born into a wealthy family. He studied engineering in New York. Sabelli was a pilot even before World War I, having learned to fly at Brooklands, England in 1912. He was awarded his pilot's certificate by the Royal Aero Club on 30 January 1912. During the First Balkan War, he volunteered to fly combat for the Bulgarians against the Turks. Indeed, he was reputed to be one of the organizers of the air effort versus the Ottoman Empire.

== Flying career ==
Sabelli volunteered for military service when Italy finally entered World War I. He was a reserve sotto-tenente in the Engineering Corps. Although already a licensed pilot and a combat veteran, he had to pass new flying examinations to fly for his country; he passed both basic and advanced military licenses for Aviatiks in August 1915. After being assigned on 30 August, he flew familiarization flights with the Adriatic Defense Flight before being sent to France to train on Nieuport 11s in mid-October 1915. He returned to Italy to fly combat for a while, being posted on 1 February 1916 to 2a Squadriglia Caccia, but without scoring any aerial victories, but winning a Silver Medal of Military Valor. While assigned here, he also served temporary duty as a Nieuport test pilot at Malpensa between 29 May and 2 July 1915. On 9 September 1916, he was promoted to tenente. He was also transferred in September. His next assignment was command of a Nieuport Defence Section (later to become 85a Squadriglia) in Albania. Being eager to score victories, he wished to return to the fighting in Italy; he mentioned this to Francesco Baracca. On 23 March 1917, Baracca alerted Sabelli that his return to Italy was imminent. When the orders came through in April, Sabelli managed a return surface journey from Albania to Italy in only 22 hours. He rejoined his old unit, now denoted as 71a Squadriglia. He would spend only a few days there.

On 9 May 1917, he was assigned to 91a Squadriglia at the request of Baracca, who was amassing a squadron of the best Italian fighter pilots, although he did not physically join it until 23 June. Sabelli had an insignia of a ladder painted on his Spad. In company with Michele Allasia, Sabelli scored his first victory on 10 August 1917, shooting down a Hansa-Brandenburg C.I trailing leader's streamers. On 6 September, Sabelli launched such an impetuous attack on a Hansa-Brandenburg C.I that he nearly collided with Barraca; the Austro-Hungarian plane crashlanded with the observer dead and the pilot wounded, for Sabelli's second triumph. On 17 September, he singlehandedly shot down another C.I. On 23 September, his best friend Ferruccio Ranza joined him in killing an Austro-Hungarian crew from Flik 35. On 29 September, he finished his string of five, joining Giorgio Pessi and Cosimo Rizzotto in killing another Austro-Hungarian air crew. He was awarded another silver medal.

== Death in action ==
On 25 October 1917, he was flying as a wingman to Pier Piccio near the Battle of Caporetto when Piccio attacked an enemy two-seater. Piccio's guns jammed, and Sabelli took his place as the shooter. An enemy patrol surprised Sabelli from behind and shot him down trailing smoke. Sabelli's body was never found. Ferruccio Ranza adopted Sabelli's ladder insignia, having it painted on his own Spad VII in remembrance of his friend.
