= Francesco Baracca =

Italian World War I flying ace

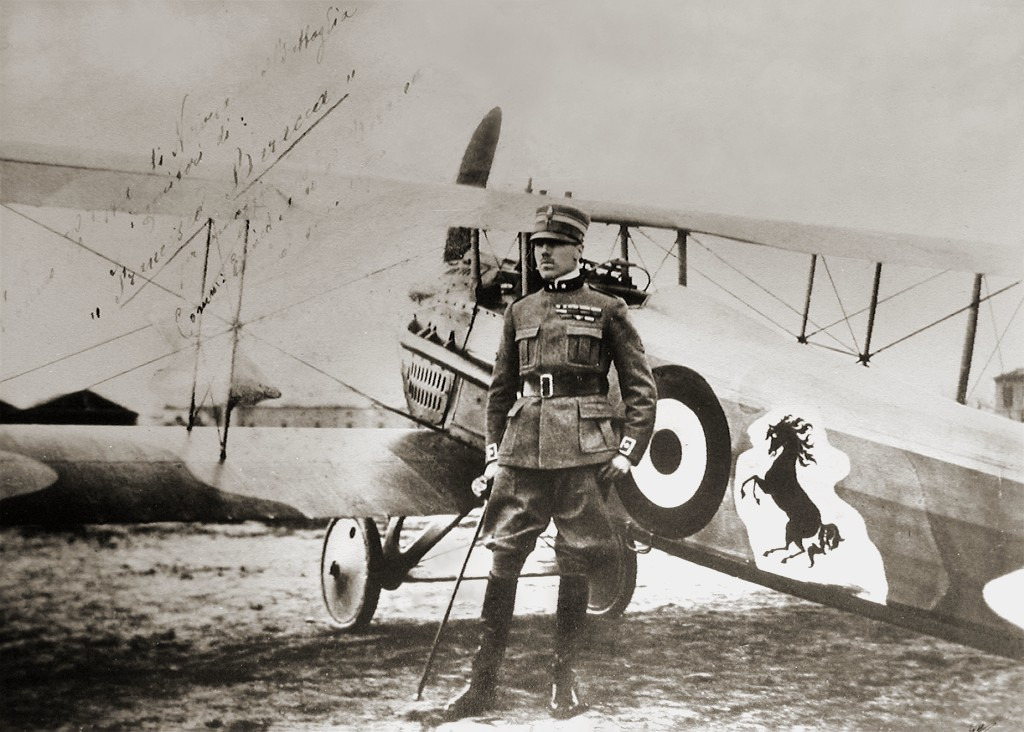
- Francesco Baracca, standing by his SPAD XIII fighter. His personal emblem, the Prancing Horse, later became the logo of Ferrari.
- Born: 9 May 1888; Lugo, Emilia-Romagna, Kingdom of Italy
- Died: 19 June 1918 (aged 30) near Montello, Veneto, Kingdom of Italy
- Military career
- Allegiance: Kingdom of Italy
- Branch: Royal Italian Army; Cavalry; Corpo Aeronautico Militare
- Service years: 1907 – 1918
- Rank: Major
- Units: Regiment "Piemonte Cavalleria" (2nd); 1a Squadriglia, 70a Squadriglia, 91a Squadriglia
- Awards: Gold Medal of Military Valor, three Silver Medal of Military Valor, British Military Cross, French Croix de Guerre, Belgian Order of the Crown

Francesco Baracca (9 May 1888 – 19 June 1918) was Italy's top fighter ace of World War I. He was credited with 34 aerial victories. The emblem he wore side by side on his plane of a black horse prancing on its two rear hooves inspired Enzo Ferrari to use it on his racing car and later in his automotive company.

== Biography ==
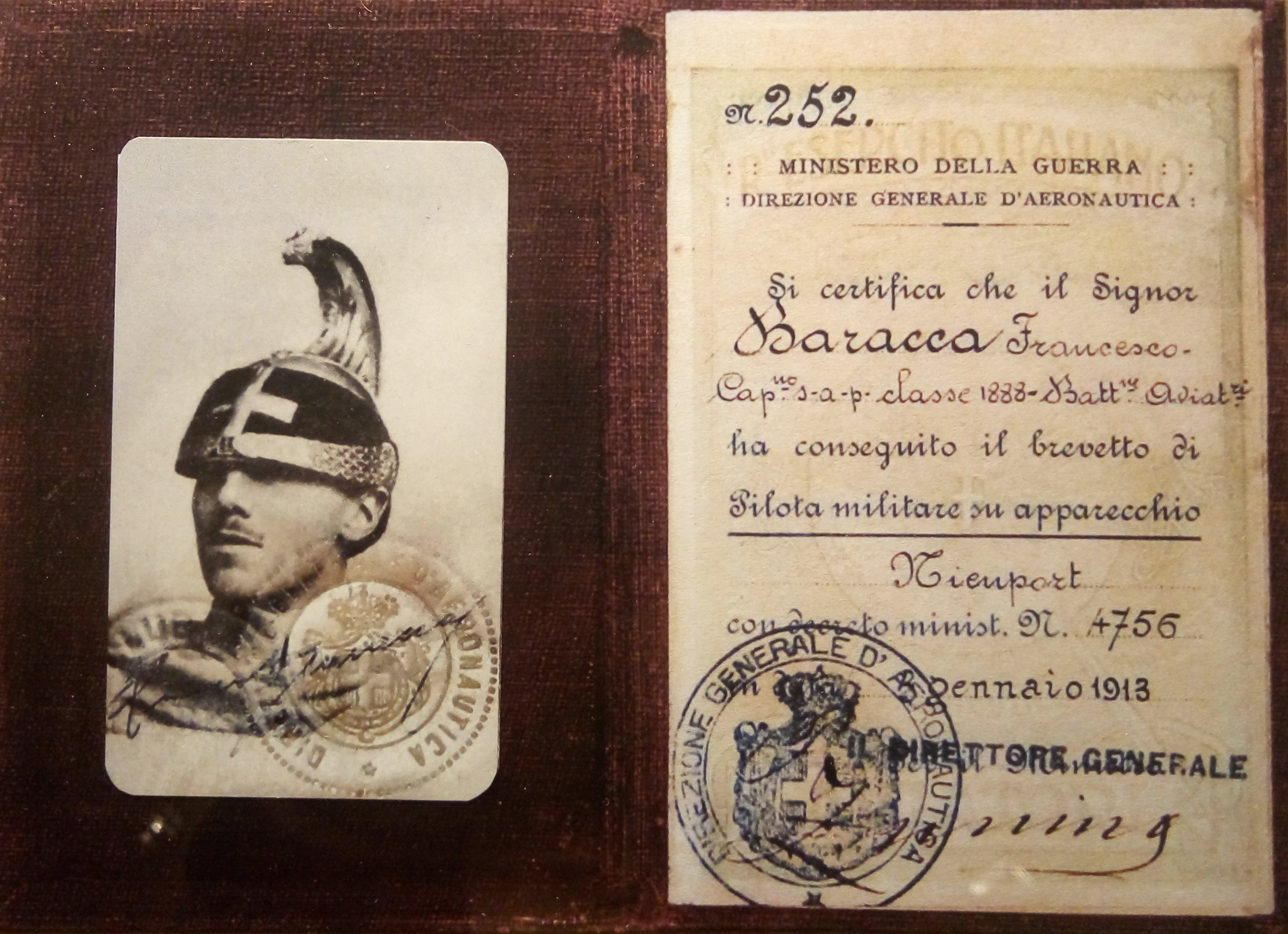
Francesco Baracca Pilot licence

Francesco Luigi Giuseppe Baracca was born in Lugo, Emilia-Romagna. He was the son of wealthy landowner Enrico Baracca (1855-1936) and his wife countess Paolina Biancoli . The younger Baracca initially studied at a private school in Florence before entering the Military Academy of Modena in October 1907. As he had become a passionate equestrian as an antidote to classroom boredom, he became a cavalryman with the prestigious Piemonte Reale Cavalleria Regiment upon his commissioning in 1910. His first duty station allowed him to attend concerts and opera in Rome, as well as pursue hunting and equestrian competitions; he gained some fame in the latter. This little idyll was spoiled by orders to report to a small town in central Italy. Baracca then became interested in aviation and learned to fly at Reims, France, receiving his pilot's license on 9 July 1912. He then served with the Battaglione Aviatori and in 1914 with the 5th and 6th Squadriglie.

=== World War I ===
During the months between the outbreak of World War I and Italy's entry into the war, there was intense political controversy in Italy between pro-war and pro-peace factions. Baracca remained aloofly neutral but ready to serve his nation. After Italy entered the war on the Entente side in May 1915, he was sent to Paris to convert to Nieuport two-seaters. Upon his return in July, he was assigned to the 8a Squadriglia Nieuport. The Nieuport 10s that equipped this squadron were almost useless against Austro-Hungarian raids; they were too slow, with too slow a rate of climb, to bring the intruders to battle with any regularity. The frustrated Italian pilots even resorted to leaving their observers ground-bound in attempts to improve performance, to little avail. On those rare occasions when the battle was joined, the Nieuports' guns usually jammed. Renaming the unit to 1a Squadriglia Caccia on 1 December 1915 did nothing to solve the problems.

The Nieuport 11 single-seat fighter with Lewis guns entered service in April 1916, and on 7 April, flying this new fighter, Baracca scored his first victory, holing the fuel tank of an Austrian Hansa-Brandenburg C.I having received forty-five hits, was forced to land and the crew, composed of Sergeant Adolf Ott and Lieutenant Observer Franz Lenarcic (who later died of the wounds) of Flik 19, was taken prisoner. This was also Italy's first aerial victory in the war. This first victory featured his favourite manoeuvre, which was to zoom in unseen behind and below an enemy and fire his machine gun from pistol range.

It was around this time that Baracca adopted as a personal emblem a black prancing horse on his Nieuport 17, in tribute to his former cavalry regiment. This prompted some to call him, "The Cavalier of the Skies". Flying the Nieuport 17 and then, from March 1917, the SPAD VII, he scored both individually, and in combination with other Italian aces.

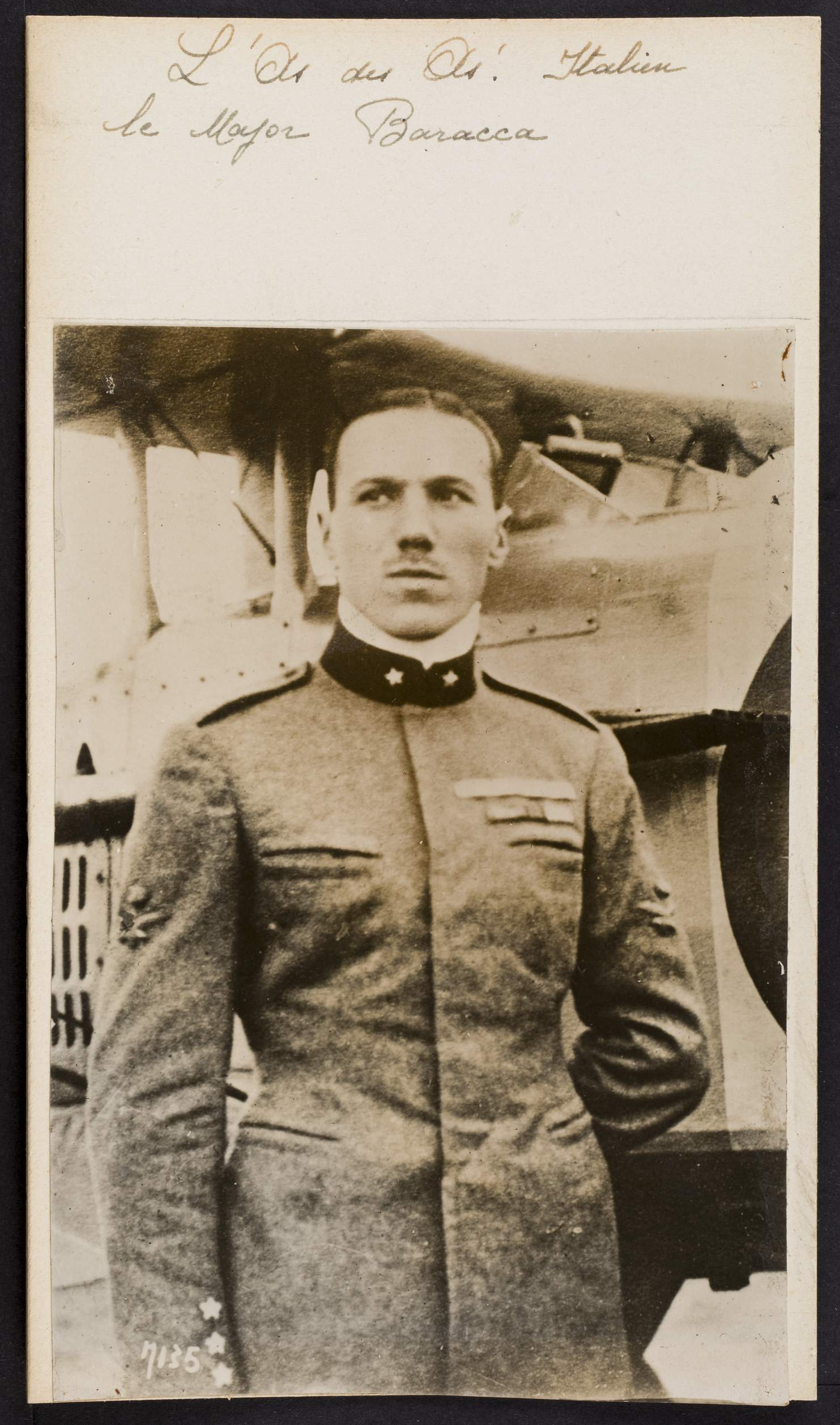
Major Francesco Baracca posed in front of his SPAD S.VII

Baracca's second victory was an Austrian Lohner over Gorizia on 23 April 1916. After his third victory, he transferred to 70a Squadriglia. Promoted to Capitano; On 28 November, he shot down his fifth aircraft in battle, obtaining registration in the Register of Aces. That day, Baracca achieved his victory in the late morning at Tolmezzo with 30 machine gun shots against the Brandenburg C.I of the Flik 16 of the observer Kálmán Sarközy, who was wounded and a prisoner and Fritz Fuchs, who did not survive the duel. On 1 January 1917, Baracca shot down an Austrian Brandenburg plane of Flik 12 near Castagnevizza flying on Ni 17 2614. On 11 February, Baracca (on Ni 17) with Fulco Ruffo di Calabria (on Ni 17), serg. Giulio Poli and Corporal Antonio Pagliari (on Ni 11) shoot down Corporal Ludwig Fleck's Br. C.1 with observer Lieutenant Wilhelm Siemienski of Flik 35 who, after hitting the tank of Corporal Anselmo Caselli's Nieuport 11 who returns in emergency, while the reconnaissance plane with the two wounded crew members manages to make a crash landing by hitting a tree and ruining its wings in the meadows near Remanzacco after a battle over the sky of Udine attended by Vittorio Emanuele III of Savoy who the next day went to the camp to congratulate the pilots. On 26 April Baracca shot down the Br. C.1 of the Zgsf. Josef Majsai and the Leut. Emmerich Treer of Flik 35 with the help of Serg. Goffredo Gorini (formerly of the 3rd Artillery Squadron) and Attilio Imolesi of the 79th Squadron near San Martino del Carso, reaching 8 victories and receiving the cross of the Military Order of Savoy. Baracca remained with the unit until, with 9 victories, he transferred to the newly formed 91st Squadriglia, known as the "Squadron of the Aces", on 1 May 1917. By that time, his ever-increasing list of victories had made him nationally famous. While he initially dodged the responsibilities and paperwork that went with command, he finally settled into heading the squadron. On 1 May, during a reconnaissance mission over Monfalcone, piloting the Hansa-Brandenburg C.I 229.08 of Flik 12, Frank Linke-Crawford had the opportunity to clash with Baracca's SPAD S.VII: the two duelled for a long time, in a very hard fight that developed from 4,000 meters to low altitude. Baracca was convinced that he had shot down his opponent, but Linke-Crawford was able to complete the mission despite 68 bullet holes found on the plane. On 10 May, Baracca shot down Zugsführer Rudolf Stöhr's Hansa-Brandenburg D.I of the FliK 41J near Vertoiba and achieved his ninth official victory. On 13 May, Baracca obtained another victory in collaboration over Br. C.1 of ace Julius Busa and observer Hermann Grössler of Fluggeschwader 1 (FlG I) on Mount Korada.On 20 May, as part of the tenth Isonzo offensive, Baracca hit a Brandenburg reconnaissance aircraft of Flik 12 on Monte Santo in Gorizia with incendiary bullets that crashed at an altitude of 363 m of Plava, a few meters from the Italian trenches. On 3 June, Baracca shot down the Hansa-Brandenburg C.I of the Zgsf. Johann Rotter with the Oblt. Max Bednarzik from the Fluggeschwader 1 or FlG. I between Plava and Monte Cucco di Plava. Baracca's friend Fulco Ruffo di Calabria nearly ended Baracca's career — and life — in June 1917. Ruffo di Calabria burst out of a cloud, firing in a head-on pass at an enemy airplane, and barely missed Baracca. Later, on the ground, Baracca assured his companion, "Dear Fulco, next time, if you want to shoot me down, aim a couple of metres to the right. Now let's go for a drink and not talk of it any more!"

Baracca temporarily upgraded to a Spad XIII in October 1917, using it to achieve a couple of victories on 22 October, and on a win scored on a joint sortie with Pier Piccio on 25 October. That night he wrote: "I had my SPAD shot up and its longeron broken into pieces by enemy machine gun fire in an aerial dogfight." As a result, Baracca returned to the more manoeuvrable Spad VII, remarking, "It doesn't matter if the VII is equipped with a single gun. Provided you are a good fighter, a single gun is just enough." Nevertheless, after repair, he sometimes returned to the Spad XIII.

Baracca remained as much as possible with the 91st Squadriglia, even after being promoted to Maggiore in November 1917. He would try to visit his victims in hospital afterwards, to pay his respects, or he would place a wreath on the grave of those he killed. He had raised his score to 30 by the end of 1917.

Soon afterwards, Baracca, Piccio, and Ruffo di Calabria were tasked with evaluating the new Ansaldo A.1 Balilla fighter. Baracca was personally decorated by King Victor Emmanuel III at La Scala at this time. It was March 1918 before Baracca convinced his superiors that he belonged back at the front. He was not long back before he found himself in a situation similar to the previous late October: his squadron was forced to withdraw by enemy advances on 27 April. It was about this time that he adopted the griffin as an insignia for the planes in his unit. Most of his pilots adopted it, though some still flaunted the prancing stallion as a gesture of respect for their commander.

=== Death ===
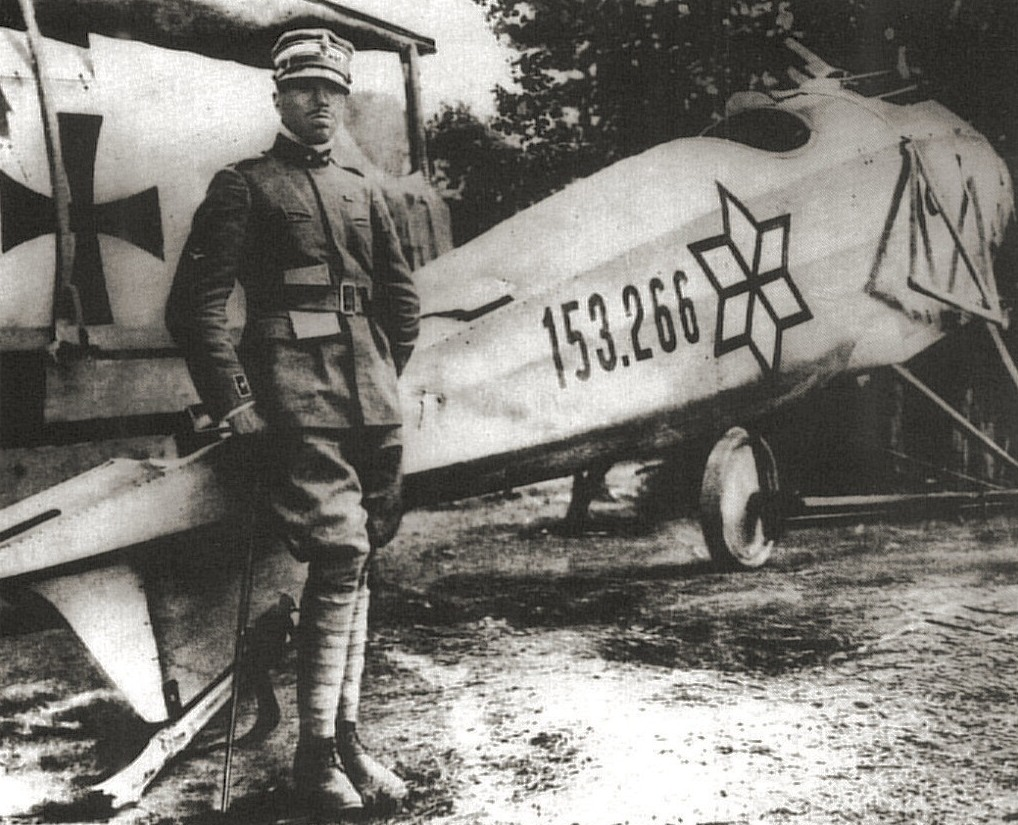
Francesco Baracca poses beside his 34th and last victory. On 15 June 1918, Baracca and Aliperta forced down at San Biagio di Callalta the Albatross D III flown by Lieutenant Sigismund von Josipovich

Baracca saw little action in 1918, but he added more victories, for a total of 34, before failing to return from a strafing mission on the Montello (hill) area on 19 June.

The Italians were taking advantage of their air superiority to fly treetop ground attack missions into a storm of small-arms fire. In the 06:30 troop support mission, Baracca and rookie pilot Tenente Franco Osnago were hit by ground fire and split from one another. A few minutes later, both Baracca's home airfield and Osnago saw a burning airplane fall. According to other sources, Baracca had left Osnago to provide him with top cover as he dived on the enemy trenches. Osnago lost sight of his commander, and then he saw something burning in a nearby valley. Some days later, on 24 June, after an Austro-Hungarian retreat, Baracca's remains were recovered from where they lay, four meters from the burnt remnants of his Spad VII. A monument in his memory was later built on the site. Osnago, Ferruccio Ranza, and a journalist named Garinei retrieved his body for the large funeral that was held in his home town of Lugo.

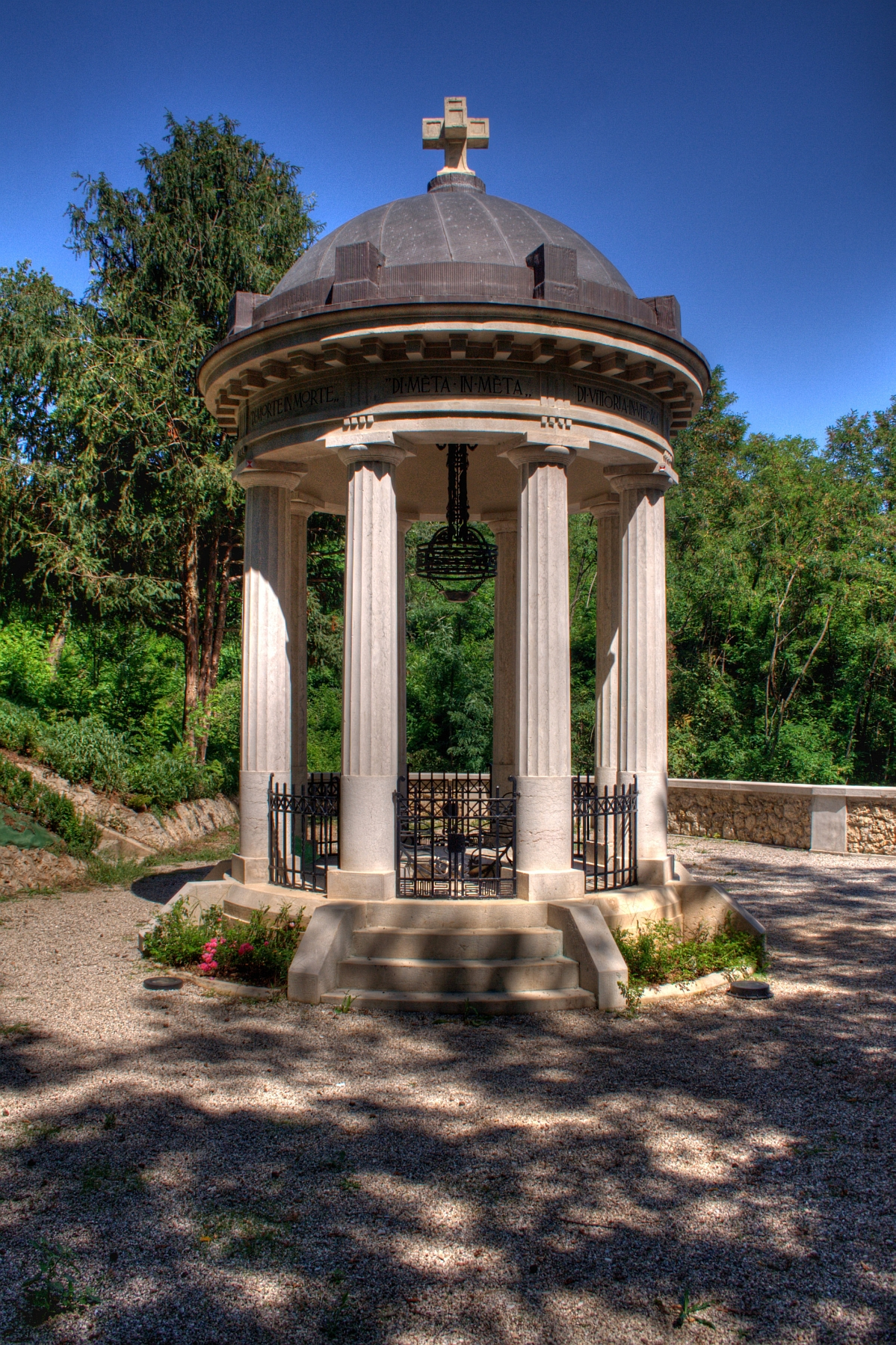
The monument at Nervesa della Battaglia.

His body, when found, reportedly bore the marks of a bullet to the head. His pistol was out of its holster, but away from his body, leading to suspicions that he elected to take his own life rather than die in a crash or be taken prisoner. An Austrian pilot reportedly claimed to have shot him down in combat. This claim is allegedly supported by evidence, but the most accepted version is that Baracca was hit by ground fire. Research in Austro-Hungarian records indicates that he was killed by the gunner of an Austrian two-seater while attacking from above and behind. (On that day at 18.10 a C.I reconnaissance aircraft of Flik 28 took off, piloted by Max Kauer with Arnold Barwig as observer-gunner. They had to fly to the front of the 17th Division to take photographs, a dangerous task with the air dominance now ensured by the Italian air force. During the flight, they saw two Spad fighters approaching about a kilometre away and promptly manoeuvred to fight them. First, the observer fired a volley of 15-20 shots at one of them who was going down, then they saw him climb up to the right and fired him again, setting him on fire.)

Ltn Arnold Barwig in Phönix C.I 121.17, piloted by Zgsf Max Kauer, claimed to have shot down the Italian ace. The Austrian crew also photographed the shot-down aeroplane and noted the time and place of engagement.

== Legacy ==
Baracca's total of 34 victory claims can largely be verified from known Austro-Hungarian losses and surviving military records, establishing the Italian as one of the highest-scoring Allied pilots during the conflict. After the war, his home in Lugo was turned into the Francesco Baracca Museum, which displays mementoes, uniforms, and medals from Baracca's life, as well as rudders and guns taken from shot-down aircraft. In the 1920s, a SPAD VII once flown by Baracca in December 1917 was presented for display, which was subsequently restored by GVAS (the Italian aeronautical preservation society).

On 17 June 1923, a unique encounter intertwined the destinies of the Prancing Horse and Enzo Ferrari forever. Enzo Ferrari wrote about that encounter: 'When I won my first Savio Circuit in Ravenna in 1923, I met Count Enrico Baracca and Countess Paolina, parents of the flying hero. One day the Countess said to me, "Ferrari, why don't you put my son's prancing horse on your cars? It'll bring you good luck." The Horse was and will always be black; I added the canary yellow background, the colour of the city of Modena.' Still, the Prancing Horse symbol would not appear on Scuderia Ferrari cars until 9 July 1932. The roller coaster at Ferrari World on Yas Island Flying Aces, is named after him and themed to him.

Many roads in Italy are named after Baracca. The airport of Bolzano, a city in the region of Trentino-Alto Adige, the Roma-Centocelle Italian Air Force base, and the Lugo di Romagna airfield are all named after Baracca. A huge monument to his memory dominates the main square of his home town at Lugo di Romagna.

He was decorated with the Order of Karađorđe's Star with swords and a number of other decorations.

== See also ==
- Luigi Olivari
- Giovanni Sabelli
- Flavio Baracchini
- Guido Nardini
- Giorgio Pessi
- Attilio Imolesi
- Gastone Novelli
- Pier Ruggero Piccio
- Fulco Ruffo di Calabria

== Sources ==
- Nieuport Aces of World War 1. Norman Franks. Osprey Publishing, 2000. ISBN 1-85532-961-1, ISBN 978-1-85532-961-4.
- SPAD XII/XIII Aces of World War I. Jon Guttman. Osprey Publishing, 2002. ISBN 1-84176-316-0, ISBN 978-1-84176-316-3.
- Franks, Norman; Guest, Russell; Alegi, Gregory. Above the War Fronts: The British Two-seater Bomber Pilot and Observer Aces, the British Two-seater Fighter Observer Aces, and the Belgian, Italian, Austro-Hungarian and Russian Fighter Aces, 1914–1918: Volume 4 of Fighting Airmen of WWI Series: Volume 4 of Air Aces of WWI. Grub Street, 1997. ISBN 1-898697-56-6, ISBN 978-1-898697-56-5.
- Varriale, Paolo. Italian Aces of World War 1. Osprey Publishing, Oxford, UK, 2009. ISBN 978-1-84603-426-8.
- Shores, Christopher. Air Aces. Greenwich, CT: Bison Books, 1983. ISBN 0-86124-104-5.
- Gentilli R., Iozzi A., Varriale P. (2003). Italian aces of World War I and their aircraft. Schiffer Publishing Ltd., Atglen PA. ISBN 0-7643-1664-8
