= Cesare Magistrini =

Italian flying ace

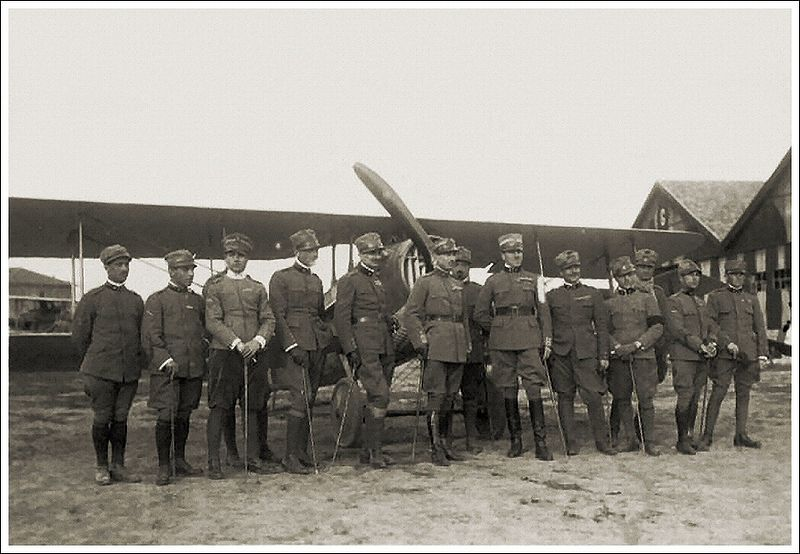
- Cesare Magistrini (fourth from left)
- Born: 26 January 1895; Maggiora, Kingdom of Italy
- Died: 26 October 1958 (aged 63); Maggiora
- Military career
- Allegiance: Kingdom of Italy
- Branch: Corpo Aeronautico Militare
- Rank: Sergente
- Units: 2a Squadriglia Parasol, 78a Squadriglia, 91a Squadriglia
- Awards: 2 Silver and 1 Bronze award of Medal for Military Valor, Order of the Crown of Italy, Silver Medal for Aeronautical Valor
- Other work: Personal pilot for the King of Yemen

Cesare Magistrini (26 January 1895 – 26 October 1958) was an Italian World War I flying ace credited with six confirmed and four unconfirmed aerial victories. He would later serve in World War II and as the personal pilot of the Imam of Yemen.

== Biography ==
=== Early life ===
Cesare Magistrini was born in Maggiora, Kingdom of Italy on 26 January 1895.

=== Military service ===
After Italy entered World War I, Magistrini began flying training in December 1915. He received his basic pilot's license in March 1916. Rated as a Caporal, he was initially assigned to 2a Squadriglia for a short spell. On 28 August 1916, he was posted to a fighter squadron, 78a Squadriglia.

On 1 March 1917, he was promoted to Sergente. By now, he was engaging in serious dogfights, during one of which he was seriously wounded but continued fighting. On 10 May 1917, he was awarded a Silver Medal for Military Valor for his tenacity in this engagement. Nevertheless, the wound did not prevent him from scoring his first aerial victory on 17 June, when he forced an enemy Albatros to land. On 18 July, Magistrini backed Guido Nardini on the latter's victory, but Magistrini's own victory claim for participation was denied. He would stake one more unconfirmed claim before transferring to 91a Squadriglia on 1 November. On 23 November, Magistrini shared a victory with Bartolomeo Costantini. One week later, in concert with Ferruccio Ranza and Gastone Novelli, he shot down a German two-seater, killing both members of its air crew. On 7 December 1917, Magistrini and Ranza shared in the kill of an Austro-Hungarian Hansa-Brandenburg C.I. Magistrini's Silver Medal award for this action noted he had engaged in 20 aerial combats

He was slightly wounded in the right knee on 18 February 1918. On 16 March he took leave. After his return from leave, he claimed four victories between 11 May and 23 August 1918; two were confirmed. He was awarded a Bronze Medal for Military Valor, as well as a Serbian decoration

=== Between the wars ===
Cesare Magistrini joined the Fascist Party in October 1922. He also returned to military flying with the Regia Aeronautica.

In 1927, he quit his military flying and began commercial piloting for Transadriatica. In July 1931, he became a military reservist. By mid-1935, he had amassed one million kilometers of flight experience. He had also garnered the Knight's Cross of the Order of the Crown of Italy.

=== Second World War and beyond ===
When the Italian airline industry was taken over by the Italian military to fight in World War II, Magistrini was pulled back into military service. This time, during the May to August award period, he would be rewarded with a further Bronze Medal for Military Valor. Also in 1942, he received the Silver Medal for Aeronautical Valor to honor his two million kilometers of flight.

After World War II, Magistrini was hired as a personal pilot by the Imam of Yemen. When he was done flying, Magistrini had logged over 22,000 flight hours.
