= Gastone Novelli =

Italian World War I flying ace

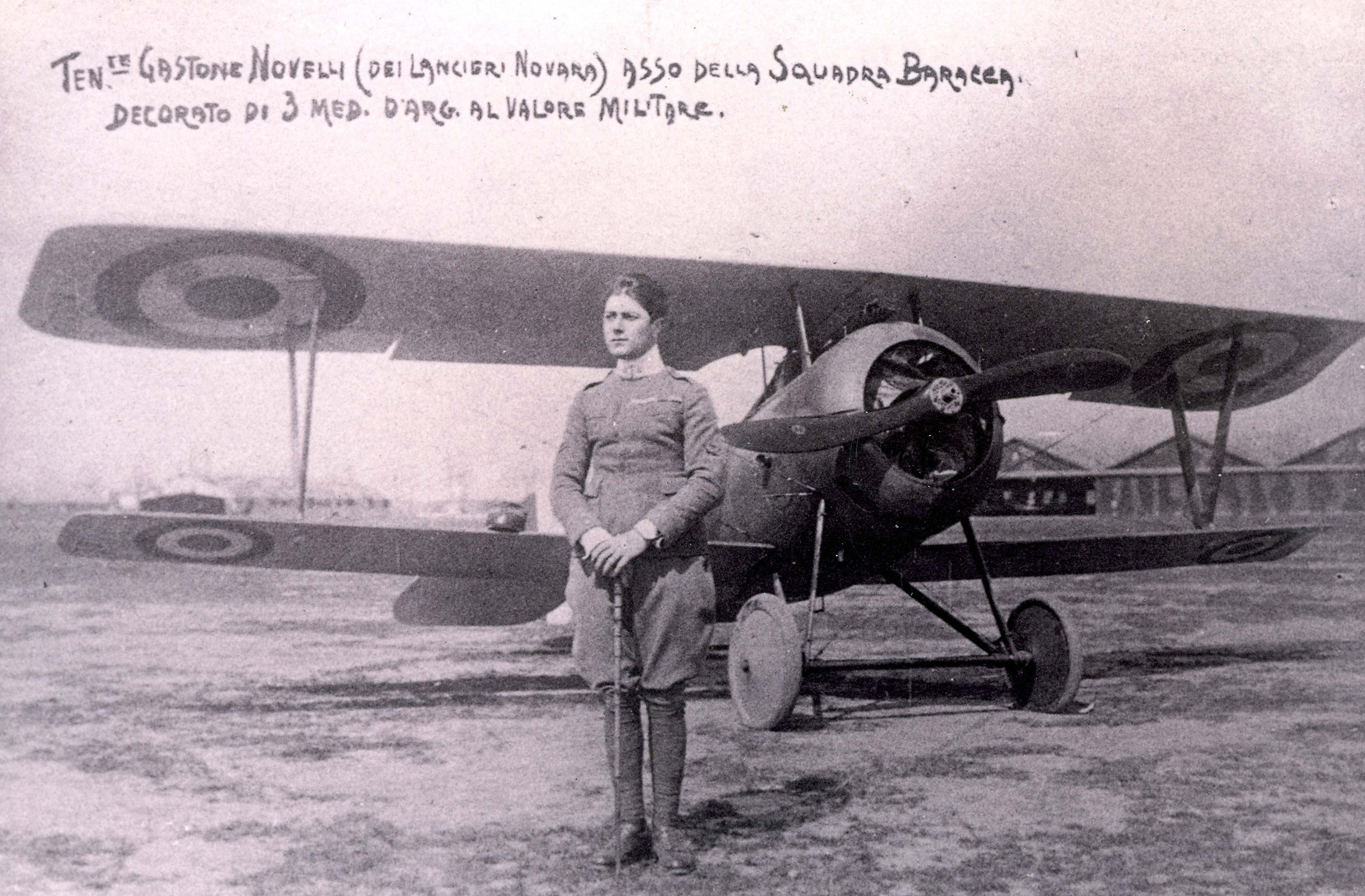
- Gastone Novelli and his Nieuport 27 during World War I
- Born: 13 June 1895; Ancona, Kingdom of Italy
- Died: 3 July 1919 (aged 24); Padua, Italy
- Military career
- Allegiance: Kingdom of Italy
- Branch: Corpo Aeronautico Militare
- Rank: Tenente
- Units: 28a Squadriglia, 76a Squadriglia, 81a Squadriglia, 91a Squadriglia
- Awards: Three Silver awards of Medal for Military Valor, War Merit Cross, Serbian Golden Merit Medal

Tenente Gastone Novelli was a World War I flying ace credited with eight aerial victories.

== Biography ==
Gastone Novelli was born on 13 June 1895 in Ancona, Kingdom of Italy. He was the son of an Italian Army General. The young Novelli attended military schools–first the Collegio Militare in Rome, then the Scuola Militare in Modena. After graduation, he was commissioned as a Sottotenente in the 8th "Montebello" Lancers Regiment during February 1915. He then had a brief assignment as a reconnaissance scout for the 43rd Artillery Regiment. This led to his flying as an aerial observer for 28a Squadriglia by August 1915.

After application for pilot's training, Novelli was granted a pilot's license for the Caudron G.3 during April 1916. He qualified on Farmans three months later, at Busto Arsizio. He was posted to a reconnaissance squadron, 30a Squadriglia, and flew combat for them from 12 August 1916 until 20 January 1917. He earned a Silver Medal for Military Valor for his feats. He was promoted to Tenente, with a provisional posting to the 5th "Novara" Lancers Regiment.

Novelli joined 81a Squadriglia and began conversion training to Nieuport fighter planes. He claimed an aerial victory during this time, on 15 April 1917, but it was unconfirmed. Having officially completed his Nieuport training in May, he scored his first three aerial victories in June 1917. On 1 August, he was transferred to acting command of 76a Squadriglia. On 11 August, he was wounded in the left arm but pressed on with his mission. Upon landing, he was shipped off to hospital. The feat was good for a second Silver Medal for Military Valor.

While healthy pilots were being sucked into the air fighting over the Battle of Caporetto, Novelli was out of action. However, on 3 November 1917, he joined the "squadron of aces", 91a Squadriglia. Here he would fight as a team member. He scored five more confirmed victories, all shared, with such fellow Italian aces as Francesco Baracca, Cesare Magistrini, Ferruccio Ranza, Guido Nardini, Pier Ruggero Piccio, and Amedeo Mecozzi. He was awarded a third Silver Medal for Military Valor at war's end. He had also won a War Merit Cross and Serbian Golden Merit Medal.

Gastone Novelli died in a takeoff accident at Padua on 3 July 1919.
