= Guido Nardini =

Italian World War I flying ace

- Born: 30 July 1881; Florence, Italy
- Died: 26 January 1928; Ciampino, Italy
- Military career
- Allegiance: Kingdom of Italy
- Branch: Aviation
- Rank: Maresciallo
- Units: 75a Squadriglia, 78a Squadriglia, 91a Squadriglia
- Awards: One Silver and two Bronze awards of Medal for Military Valor

Maresciallo Guido Nardini (1881-1928) was a World War I flying ace credited with six aerial victories.

== Biography ==
Guido Nardini was born in Florence, Kingdom of Italy. His reported birth date differs according to authority consulted; dates given are 30 July 1881 or 13 March 1893. He earned a pilot's license, No. 590, at Bétheny, France before World War I, on 22 August 1911.

== World War I military service ==
As World War I heated up, Nardini volunteered for military service despite his age. As a soldato, Nardini opened his victory skein flying a Nieuport 10 on 27 June 1916, when he, Alessandro Buzio, and a couple of other pilots shot down an enemy airplane after a 20 kilometer chase over Verona. The feat earned Nardini a Bronze Medal for Military Valor.

By February 1917, he was serving with 78a Squadriglia as a Caporal, flying frequently as the wingman to Italy's leading ace, Francesco Baracca. Nardini used a Nieuport 17 to score his second victory on 14 June 1917. This victory earned him a Silver Medal for Military Valor. A month later, he shot down his third victim, on 18 July.

Nardini transferred to 91a Squadriglia, but on 10 February 1918, shortly after his arrival, he had an accident while test piloting a Nieuport 17. Baracca had also transferred into squadron; on 3 May 1918, Nardini and Baracca jointly incinerated a Hansa-Brandenburg C.I south of Grave di Papadopoli. Two weeks later, Nardini, Gastone Novelli, and Cesare Magistrini teamed up on the Albatros D.III of Franz Gräser over Pero, and Nardini was a live ace and Gräser a dead one. Nardini was subsequently awarded a second Bronze Medal for Military Valor.

A month later, on 15 June 1918, after two years of combat, Nardini rounded out his list with a solo victory over another Albatros D.III. On 23 August 1918, he was hospitalized for injuries suffered in a fall from a motorcycle.

== Post World War I ==
Nardini continued to serve through war's end and beyond. In 1923, he transferred to the newly established Regia Aeronautica. He was promoted out of the enlisted ranks, becoming a Maresciallo.

While flying over Ciampino airfield, Guido Nardini bailed out of an airplane in trouble, and was killed by a malfunctioning parachute on 26 January 1928.
