= 91a Squadriglia =

- ensign of the 91ª Squadriglia caccia of the Regia Aeronautica
- Active: 1 May 1917–Present
- Country: Kingdom of Italy
- Branch: Corpo Aeronautico Militare
- Type: Fighter squadron
- Nickname: "Squadron of the Aces"
- Engagements: World War I

Aircraft flown
- Fighter: Nieuport 11; SPAD S.VII; SPAD S.XIII

Squadriglia 91a is one of the later fighter squadrons that the Italian Army created, on 1 May 1917. Because it drew an experienced cadre of pilots from pre-existing 70a Squadriglia, the squadron scored 14 victories within its first month of flying combat. As a result, it became known as "the squadron of aces". The new unit was immediately drawn into the ongoing Battles of the Isonzo in northern Italy. In September 1917, the squadron would serve as test pilots of the nearly universally condemned SIA 7 multipurpose aircraft.

The squadron fought in the disastrous Battle of Caporetto in late 1917 and suffered through the subsequent retreat. On 11 April 1918, it returned to combat at Quinto di Treviso, with an added task of flying ground support missions. After Italy's top ace, Francesco Baracca was killed on such a mission, King Victor Emmanuel III renamed the squadron to honor the fallen ace. 91a Squadriglia would end the war credited with 60 aerial victories for a cost of six killed. Nine pilots scored five or more victories while serving with the squadron.

The unit flies today as part of the 10th Gruppo of the 36th Wing (Italy).

== History ==
Squadriglia 91a of the Corpo Aeronautico Militare was established on 1 May 1917, drawing upon the existing 70a Squadriglia for its start. The new unit deployed to Istrana, near the ongoing Battles of the Isonzo, on 6 June 1917, with the objective of supporting ground action in the Trentino. It scored 14 victories within its first month of operations, largely because it included such experienced pilots as Francesco Baracca, Luigi Olivari, Ferruccio Ranza, and Fulco Ruffo di Calabria. Indeed, the 91a Squadriglia gained the nickname Squadriglia degli assi (Squadron of the aces).

In September 1917, the squadron evaluated the new SIA 7 for fighter use and unanimously turned it down. The squadron was then drawn into the fighting at the Battle of Caporetto, losing two ace pilots in October. After a withdrawal caused by the Italian defeat at Caporetto, the squadron settled into winter quarters at Padova and refurbished itself. Foul weather prevented winter operations, with the idle period extending into the new year.

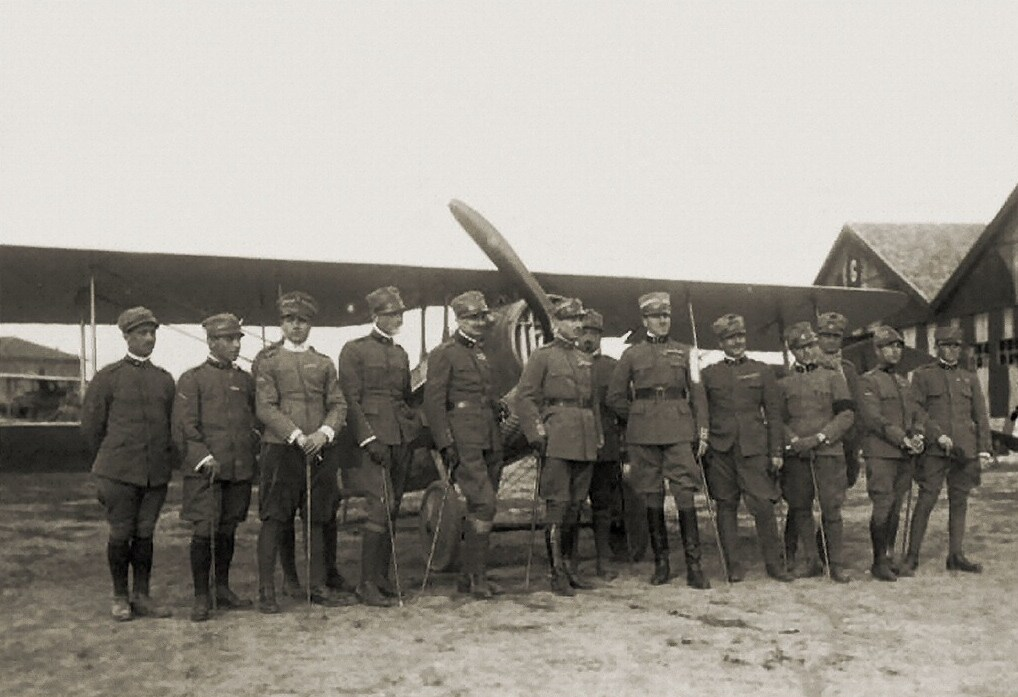
A group portrait of the squadron's pilots.

On 11 April 1918, after moving to Quinto di Treviso, the 91a Squadriglia acquired an additional tactical role in flying trench strafing mission. Italy's leading flying ace of the war Francesco Baracca would be killed flying such a sortie on 19 June 1918. Within a few days, King Victor Emmanuel III decreed that the squadron be renamed to honor the fallen ace. By 31 August, the squadron had 25 aircraft on strength, but only 16 pilots. The 91a Squadriglia would fight through war's end. It would claim 60 aerial victories for the war, while suffering six casualties.

In the twenty-first century, since 2010 the 91st squadron has been, with the 10th group, under the 36th Wing, on the air base of Gioia del Colle, and operates with Eurofighter Typhoon fighters. In 1971, one of the four squadron badges chosen to create the coat of arms of the Air Force was the 91st, in the right upper quadrant there is a red rampant griff on a silvery background.

== Commanding officers ==
- Maggiore Guido Tacchini: 1 May 1917-5 June 1917
- Francesco Baracca: 6 June 1917
- Bartolomeo Costantini: 24 December 1917 - 24 January 1918
- Francesco Baracca: 24 January 1918 - KIA 19 June 1918
- Fulco Ruffo di Calabria: 21 June 1918 - 18 September 1918
- Ferruccio Ranza: 18 September 1918 through war's end

== Duty stations ==
- Santa Caterina: 1 May 1917
- Istrana: 6 June 1917
- Santa Caterina: 29 June 1917
- La Comina: ca November 1917
- Arcade, Italy: ca November 1917
- Padua: ca November 1917
- Quinto di Treviso: 11 April 1918

== Notable members ==
Nine aces scored at least five of their victories while flying with 91a Squadriglia.

- Francesco Baracca (KIA)
- Pier Ruggero Piccio
- Fulco Ruffo di Calabria
- Ferruccio Ranza
- Bartolomeo Costantini
- Gastone Novelli
- Giorgio Pessi
- Giovanni Sabelli (KIA)
- Cesare Magistrini

== Aircraft ==
Squadron insignia was a black griffon, although this was sometimes supplemented by other personal markings of the individual pilot.

- Nieuport 11
- Spad VII
