= Luigi Olivari =

- Born: 29 December 1891; La Spezia, Kingdom of Italy
- Died: 13 October 1917 (aged 25)
- Military career
- Allegiance: Kingdom of Italy
- Branch: Corpo Aeronautico Militare
- Rank: Tenente
- Units: 1a Squadriglia/70a Squadriglia, 91a Squadriglia
- Awards: 4 Silver and 2 Bronze awards of Medal for Military Valor, French Croix de Guerre, Serbian Order of the Star of Karađorđe

Tenente Luigi Olivari (29 December 1891 – 13 October 1917) was a World War I flying ace who claimed 19 aerial victories. His Spad VII stalled into a fatal crash on 13 October 1917. Posthumously, he was awarded credit for eight aerial victories.

== Biography ==
Luigi Olivari was born in La Spezia, the Kingdom of Italy, on 29 December 1891. He earned an Aero Club pilot's license on 27 November 1914, prior to Italy's entry into World War I. On 19 May 1915, the week before Italy entered the war, Olivari applied for military pilot's training. On 15 June, he qualified on 50 horsepower Blériots; on 26 August 1915, he was on the 80 horsepower version.

On 28 January 1916, he was assigned to fly in the 1a Squadriglia (later redesignated as 70a Squadriglia), ranked as an aspirant. On 7 April, he scored his first aerial victory; it was only the second one for Italy. It was the second of Olivari's 18 victory claims, the first having gone unconfirmed.

On 1 September 1916, Olivari was commissioned as a Sottotenente. By April 1917, he was specifically assigned two aircraft—a Spad VII, as well as a Nieuport 17 ser. no. 3127. The following month, he was transferred to the newly formed fighter squadron 91a Squadriglia; however, he was also loaned to 77a Squadriglia for about a month, beginning 7 May. He was subsequently promoted to Tenente and assigned as an Ansaldo SVA.5 test pilot for the Technical Directorate. As part of these duties, on 21 August 1917, he ferried an SVA to 91a Squadriglia for their testing.

At 0957 hours on 13 October 1917, Luigi Olivari's Spad VII stalled during takeoff. He died in the crash. At the time of his death, he had won two Bronze and three Silver awards of the Medal for Military Valor; a fourth Silver would be awarded posthumously. He had also won a French Croix de Guerre and a Serbian Order of the Star of Karađorđe. Twelve of his 19 victory claims had been confirmed.

== Legacy ==
On 1 February 1919, the Bongiovanni military intelligence commission issued its final determination of Italian aerial victories during World War I. Olivari's score was cut back to eight confirmed victories; some victories that were noted in Olivari's award citations were not among them.

The Ghedi Air Force base, home of the Regia Aeronautica 6th Stormo (6th Wing) was named in his memory after the war.

== Sources ==
- Franks, Norman; Guest, Russell; Alegi, Gregory. Above the War Fronts: The British Two-seater Bomber Pilot and Observer Aces, the British Two-seater Fighter Observer Aces, and the Belgian, Italian, Austro-Hungarian and Russian Fighter Aces, 1914–1918: Volume 4 of Fighting Airmen of WWI Series: Volume 4 of Air Aces of WWI. Grub Street, 1997. ISBN 1-898697-56-6, ISBN 978-1-898697-56-5.
