= Alliata =

Alliata Alliati, Agliata
- Country: Republic of Pisa; Kingdom of Sicily; Kingdom of the Two Sicilies; Kingdom of Italy; Italy
- Founded: 12th century
- Founder: Betto di Alliata di Pisa
- Current head: Gabriele Alliata di Villafranca
- Titles: Prince of Villafranca; Prince of the Holy Roman Empire; Peer of Sicily; Grandee of Spain; Duke of Salaparuta; Baron of Villafranca; Elder of Pisa
- Cadet branches: Alliata di Pisa; Alliata di Sicilia

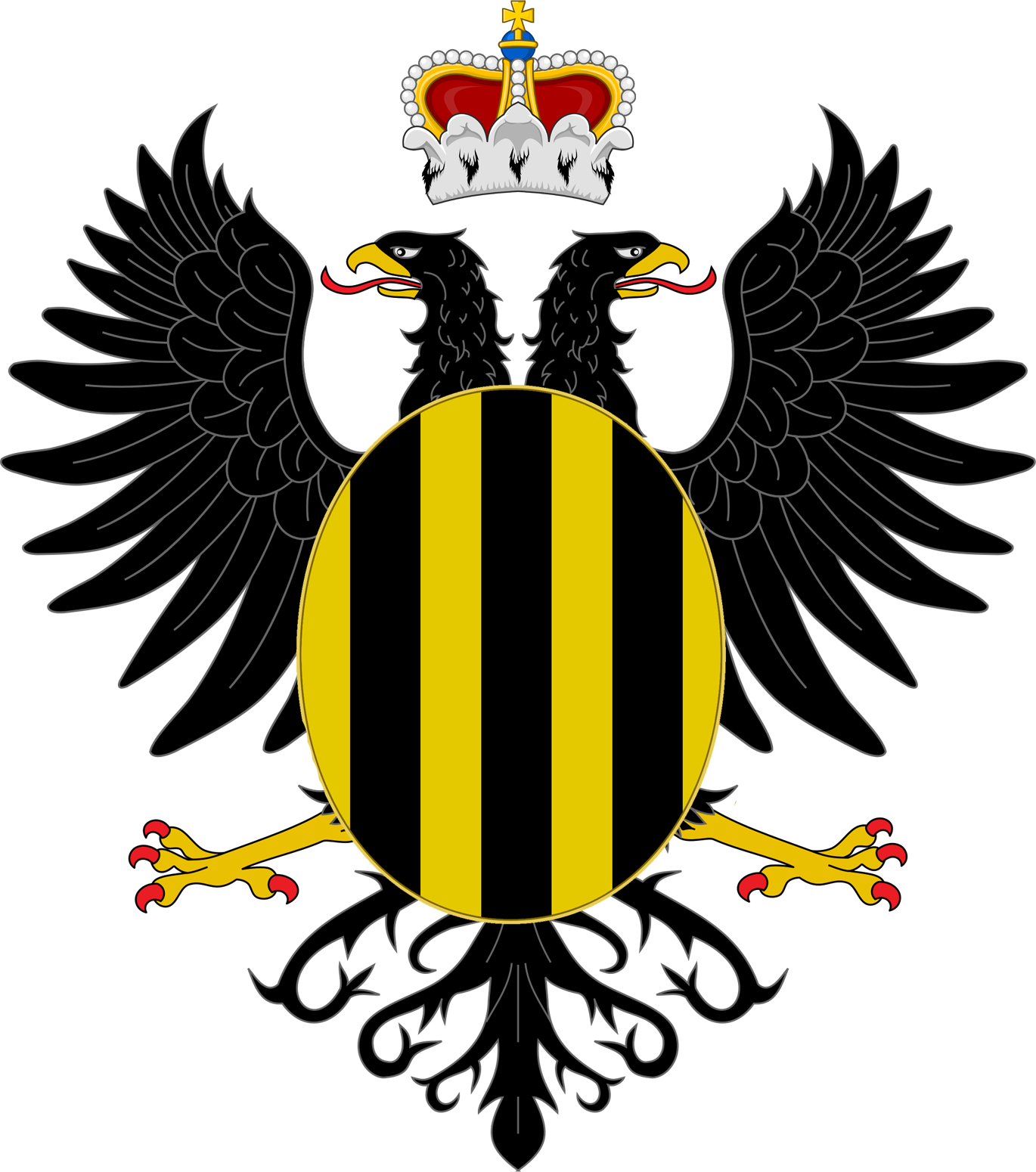
Coat of arms of the House of Alliata

The House of Alliata or Agliata is an ancient Italian noble family.

== History ==
The Alliata or Agliata family is among Italy's oldest noble families. The family claims an ancestor mentioned in an Imperial decretus of 325 AD, during the reign of Roman Emperor Constantine the Great. In 530 AD, Dacius Alliata became Archbishop of Milan. When Dacius Alliata died in 552, he was declared a saint by the Chalcedonian Church with a feast day on 14 January.

In the 12th century, the family resettled at Pisa and then Palermo, where they accumulated several titles of Prince, including Prince of the Holy Roman Empire, the title of Gentiluomo di camera di Sua Santità, and numerous other titles.

In 1860, one Alfonzo Alliata led a failed mercenary force against Giuseppe Garibaldi's Expedition of the Thousand; Alliata was the sole survivor of his company.
