= SPAD S.VII =

French WW1 fighter aircraft

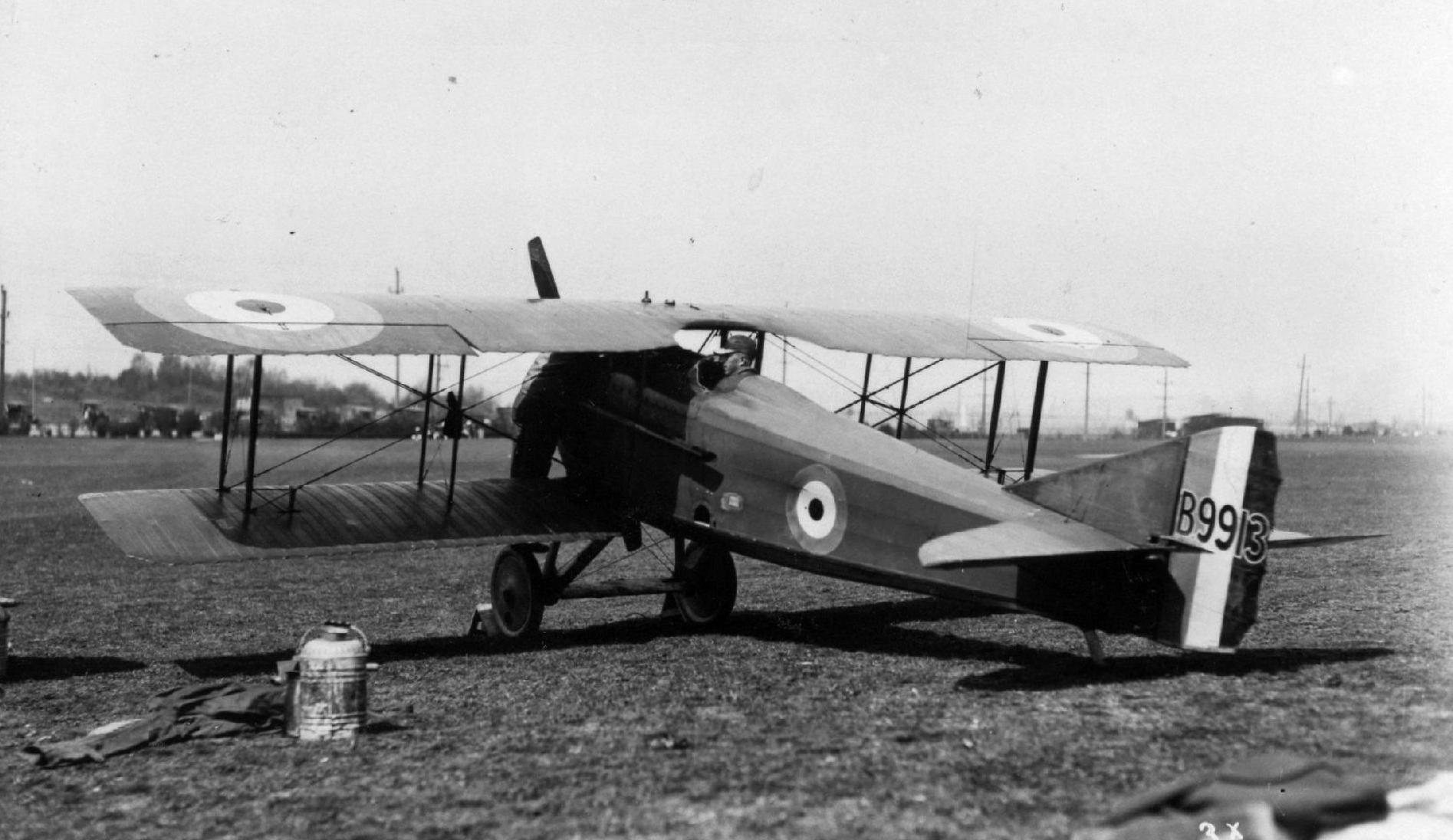
- British-built SPAD S.VII of the RFC

General information
- Type: Biplane fighter
- National origin: France
- Manufacturer: SPAD
- Designer: Louis Béchereau
- Primary users: Aéronautique Militaire Royal Flying Corps - Corpo Aeronautico Militare - Aviation Militaire Belge
- Number built: ~6,000

History
- Introduction date: August 1916
- First flight: May 1916
- Developed from: SPAD S.A.

The SPAD S.VII C.1 was the first in a series of single-seat biplane fighter aircraft produced by Société Pour L'Aviation et ses Dérivés (SPAD) during the First World War. Like its successors, the S.VII was renowned as a sturdy and rugged aircraft with good diving characteristics. It was also a stable gun platform, although pilots used to the more manoeuvrable Nieuport fighters found it heavy on the controls. It was flown by a number of famous aces, such as France's Georges Guynemer, Italy's Francesco Baracca and Australia's Alexander Pentland.

== Design and development ==
=== Origins ===
In February 1915, Swiss designer Marc Birkigt had created an overhead cam aviation powerplant based on his Hispano-Suiza V8 automobile engine, resulting in a 150-kilogram (330 lb) engine capable of producing 100 kW (140 hp) at 1,400 rpm. Further refinement brought the power to 110 kW (150 hp) by July 1915. Given the engine's potential, French officials ordered called upon aircraft designers to create a new high-performance fighter around the engine, called the Hispano-Suiza 8A, with production to begin as soon as possible.

Louis Béchereau, chief designer of the SPAD company, quickly produced a prototype fighter with the new engine. The SPAD V was a version of the SPAD S.A two-seat "pulpit fighter", which dispensed with the so-called "pulpit" which carried the observer in front of the propeller.

=== Design ===
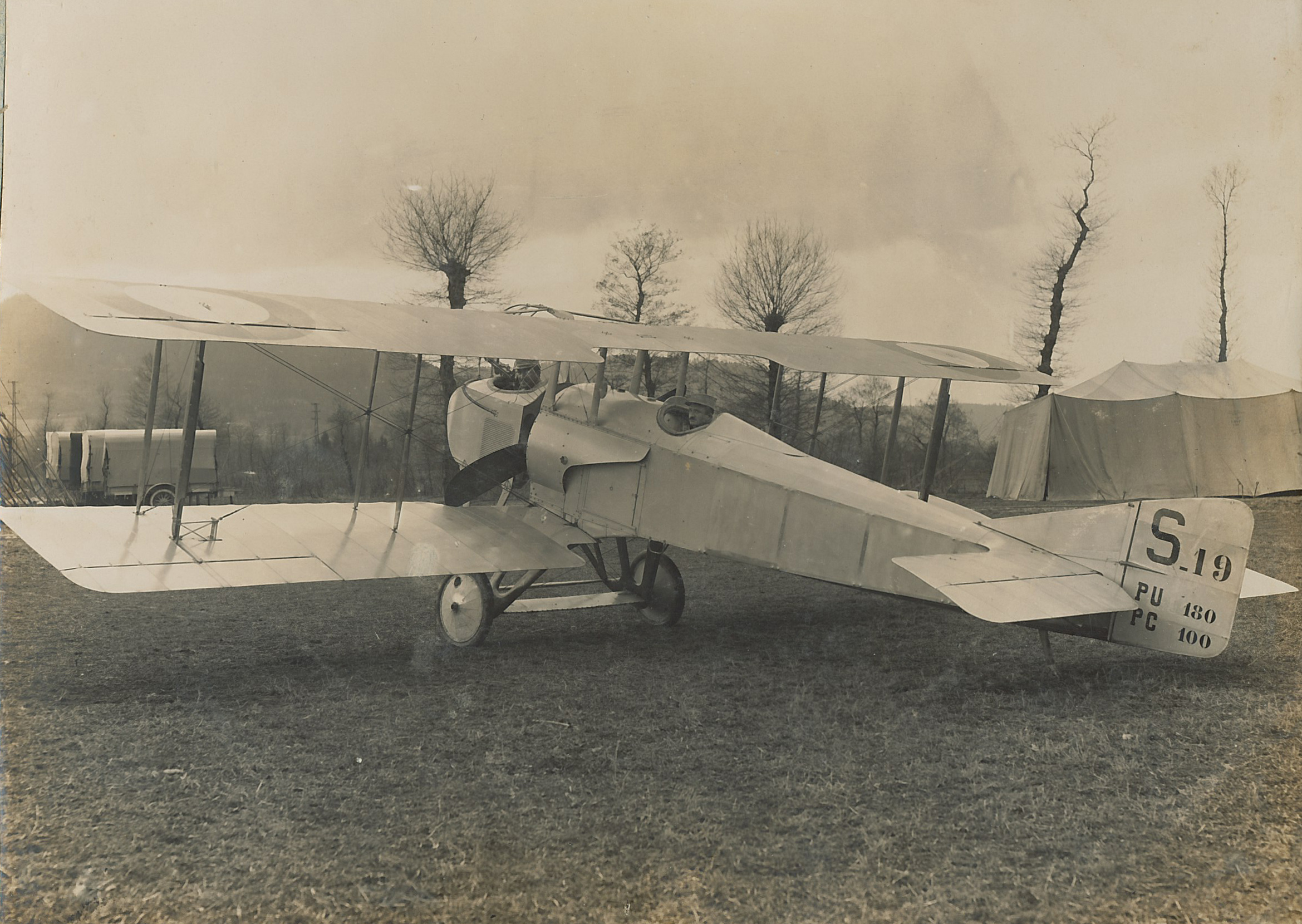
SPAD S.A.2 two seater that the S.VII was developed from. The observer sat precariously in a basket, the "pulpit", ahead of the propeller.

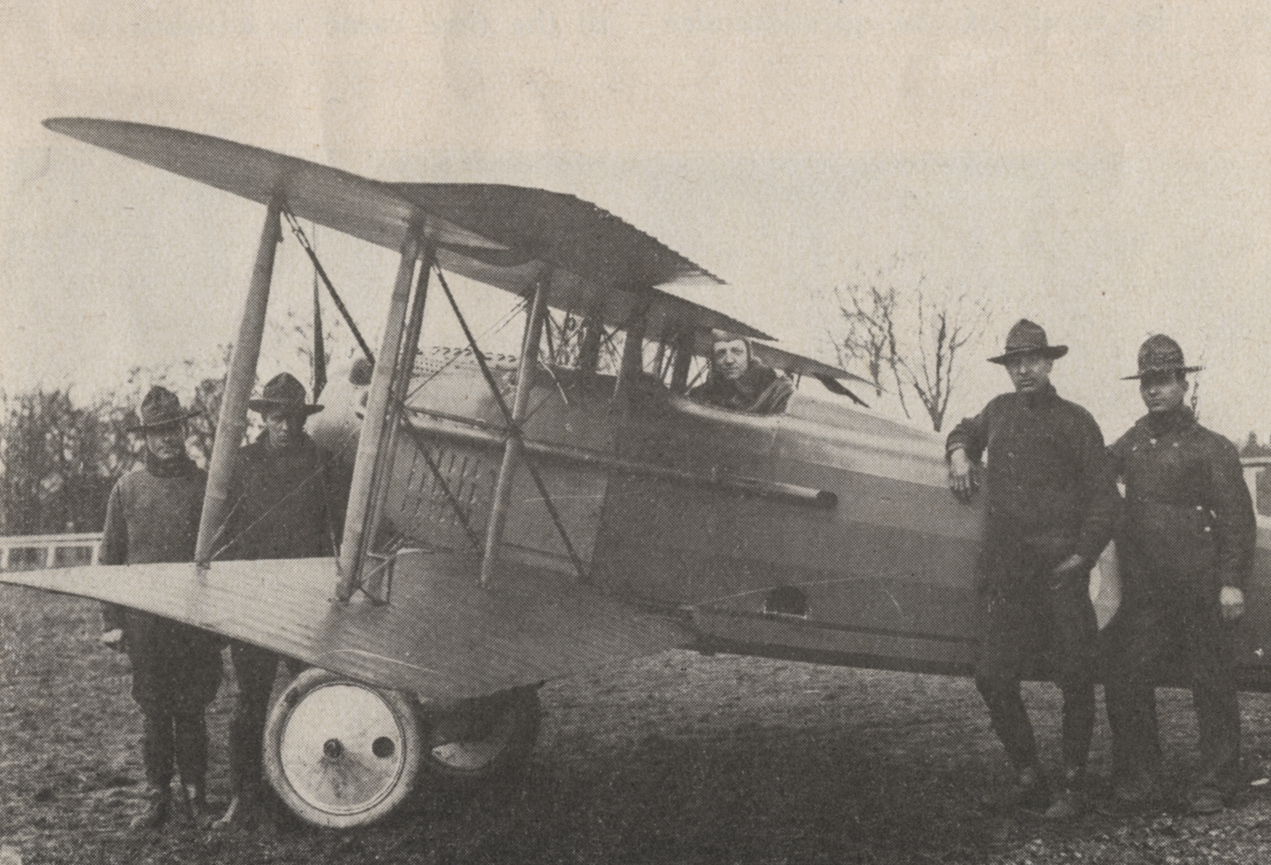
Both the S.VII and S.XIII shared the exposed aileron bellcrank as part of its control linkage, with the "pulpit" style A.2 (top)

One of many many common design features between the new SPAD V and the S.A.2 was the use of a single-bay biplane wing with additional struts mounted mid-bay at the point of junction of the flying and landing wires. This design simplified rigging and reduced drag. The fuselage was of the standard construction for the time, consisting of a wooden frame covered with fabric, while the forward part was covered with metal sheeting. A .303 (7.7mm) Vickers machine gun was installed above the engine, synchronized to fire through the propeller arc. The prototype was also fitted with a large spinner, to be abandoned later. Another common design feature of both the "pulpit fighters" and the S.VII – also shared with the S.XIII – was the pushrod aileron control linkage, which used a pair of exposed, 90° bellcranks protruding from the lower wing panels to operate vertical pushrods, going up to forward-projecting aileron control horns.

SPAD test pilot Bequet flew the SPAD V for the first time in April 1916. Flight testing revealed excellent maximum speed (192 km/h (119 mph) and climb rate of 4.5 min to 2,000 m (6,560 ft)). The airframe's sound construction also enabled a good diving performance. In comparison, the Nieuport 17 sesquiplane fighters that equipped a large part of the fighter units couldn't dive as fast because of their lower weight, but could outclimb the SPADs by a wide margin. The high diving speed promised to give lower-skilled Allied pilots the initiative to engage or leave combat against heavier German fighters. If the new fighter was a rugged and stable shooting platform, many pilots regretted its lack of manoeuvrability.

An initial production contract was made on 10 May 1916, calling for 268 machines, to be designated SPAD VII C.1 (C.1, from avion de chasse in French, indicating the aircraft was a fighter, while the 1 indicated it was a single seater).

Early production aircraft suffered from numerous defects which took time to resolve and limited deliveries. While a few SPADs arrived at frontline units as early as August 1916, large numbers only began to appear in the first months of 1917. In hot weather, the engine overheated and in cold weather, the engine would not warm up. Field modifications attempted to counter the problem, including cutting extra holes in the metal sheeting to provide more air over the engine. On the production lines, the cowling opening was enlarged and then redesigned with vertical shutters to solve both problems. The engine mount also proved weak, and reinforcements were added. Early production aircraft had two ammunition drums: one for the loaded canvas cartridge belt, and one to hold the empty belt after the rounds had been fired. However, dealing with the fabric belt as it came out of the gun was a significant problem, and was prone to jamming, which was only solved when Prideaux disintegrating ammo links were introduced.

With the initial teething problems solved, several subcontractors began producing the SPAD VII under license. The subcontractors included the firms Grémont, Janoir, Kellner et Fils, de Marçay, Société d'Etudes Aéronautiques, Régy and Sommer. It was not, however, until February 1917 that the last examples from the initial batch of 268 aircraft was delivered. In early 1917, an improved version of the engine developing 130 kW (180 hp), the Hispano-Suiza 8Ab, was made available. This provided the SPAD VII with better performance, the top speed increasing from 192 to 208 km/h (119 to 129 mph). The new engine gradually became the standard powerplant for the SPAD VII and by April 1917, all newly produced aircraft were equipped with it.

=== Variants and experiments ===
Numerous experiments were made to improve performance. A Renault V8 110 kW (150 hp) powerplant was tested but required major redesign and the performance was not worthwhile. A supercharged Hispano-Suiza engine was also tested, but also failed to significantly improve performance. Different wing profiles were tested but were not incorporated in production models. One field modification was applied in Czechoslovakia after the war when the undercarriage struts of one S.VII were faired over.

Early in the development of the S.VII, the British RFC and RNAS showed an interest in the new fighter. An initial order for 30 aircraft was made but production difficulties kept the delivery rate very low, with production not even meeting French requirements. As the RFC was encountering stronger opposition over the Front, production of the S.VII was initiated in the United Kingdom. Blériot & SPAD Aircraft Works and Mann, Egerton & Co. Ltd. were supplied with plans and sample aircraft and to begin production as soon as possible.

The first British-built S.VII was flown and tested in April 1917, and the first aircraft was reported to have performance equal to that of French models. There were however differences between the two. The British were worried about the light armament of the S.VII as most German fighters were now carrying two guns and experiments were made with an extra machine gun on the S.VII. One aircraft was fitted with a Lewis machine gun on the top wing and tested at Martlesham Heath in May 1917, while front line units also made field modifications with Foster mounts commonly associated with the Royal Aircraft Factory S.E.5. The performance penalty was too drastic for the installation to become standard, and most S.VIIs flew with a single Vickers.

Other distinguishing features of the British-built S.VIIs included a gun fairing and a solid cowling access panel. The gun fairing partially covered the gun and extended rearwards, replacing the windshield. This, however, seriously limited pilot vision to the front and, although retained on training aircraft, was removed on aircraft destined for front line units. The bulged engine access panel located under the exhaust pipe on British models was made of a solid sheet of metal, in place of the louvered panel fitted on French production models. Some British SPADs were also fitted with small spinners on the prop hub.

It was soon apparent that British production lines had lower quality standards than their French counterparts, degrading performance and handling. Poor fabric sewing, fragile tailskids and ineffective radiators plagued the British SPADs. Photographic evidence shows that some had the cylinder bank fairings, or even the entire upper engine cowling, cut out to compensate for the malfunctioning radiators. As a result, most British-built S.VIIs were used for training, with front line units equipped with French-built models. After some 220 had been produced, British production of the S.VII was halted in favour of comparable British types that were becoming available.

In a similar fashion, the Dux factory in Moscow produced approximately 100 S.VIIs under licence in 1917, with engines supplied by France. It would appear the engines were often used and/or of lower quality, and that Dux used lower-grade material in building the airframes. This combination of extra weight and weaker powerplants significantly reduced performance.

The total number of aircraft produced is uncertain, with sources varying from 3,825 to some 5,600 SPAD S.VIIs built in France, 220 in the United Kingdom and approximately 100 in Russia. French production numbers may include other SPAD models, and/or S.VIIs produced by other contractors.

The SPAD XII began as an enlarged S.VII, equipped with a 37 mm cannon. It was a distinct type rather than a variant of the S.VII though. the S.VII can be distinguished from both the S.XII and the later and larger S.XIII by having unraked cabane struts, connecting the top wing to the fuselage, as well as differences in armament.

Late models were equipped with 130 kW (170 hp) or 150 kW (200 hp) Hispano-Suiza engines. The upgrade produced a top speed of 212 km/h (132 mph).

== Operational history ==
=== France ===
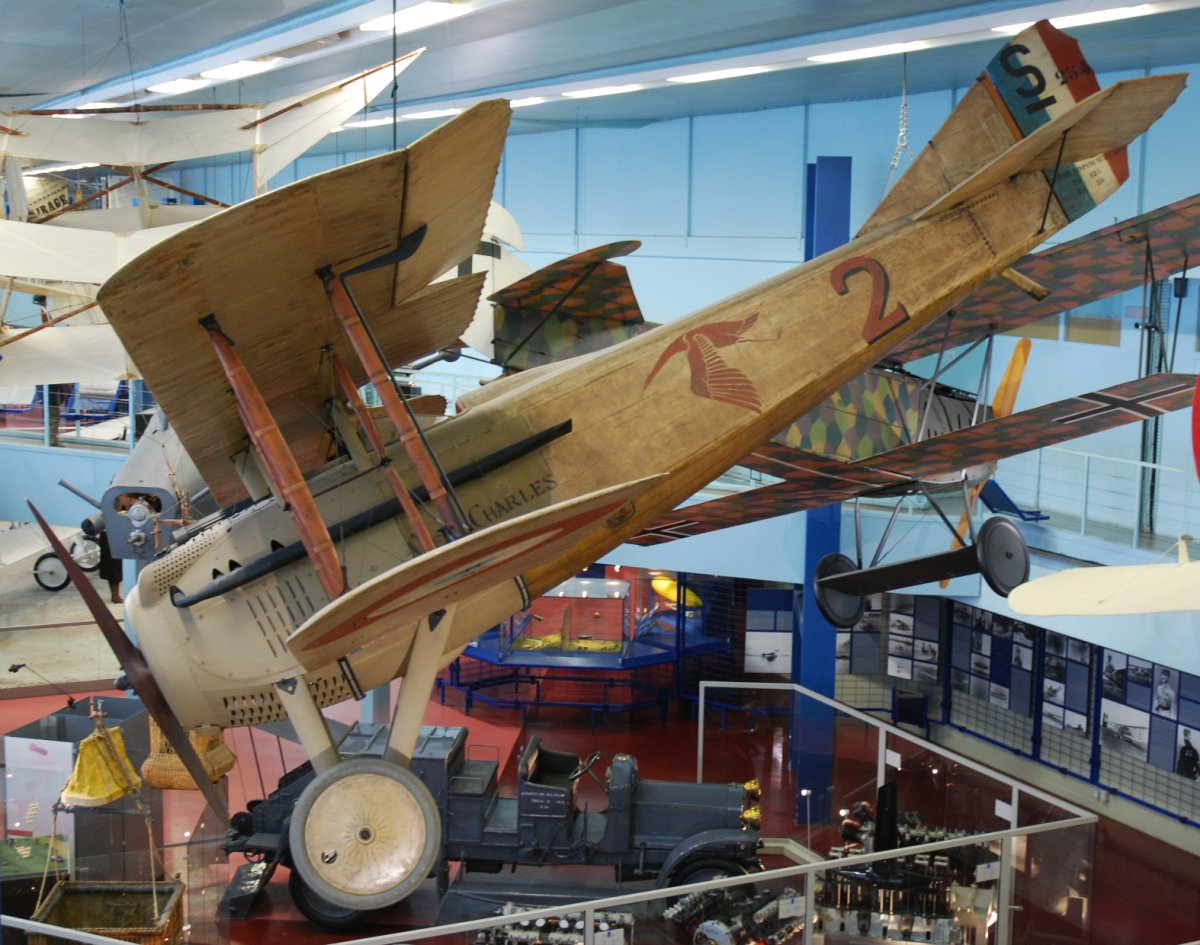
An original SPAD S.VII at the Musée de l'Air et de l'Espace, once flown by Georges Guynemer in World War I

The French Aviation Militaire had been sufficiently impressed by the performance of the SPAD V prototype to order a batch of 268 aircraft on 10 May 1916. However, teething problems soon appeared and it would be several months before the SPAD VII would serve in significant numbers on the front, the last aircraft of the initial batch only being delivered in February 1917.

In spite of these delays, some aircraft were delivered to frontline units as early as August 1916, complementing the Nieuport fighters. By this date, the Nieuport 11 that had ended the infamous "Fokker scourge" episode had been largely replaced by later types such as the Nieuport 17, but these were now being bested by a new generation of German fighters by the second half of 1916 that threatened to give Germany mastery of the skies again. At the same time, the rotary engines that had powered most Allied fighters until then were proving difficult to scale further, while the heavier inline engines were steadily getting more powerful. In this context, it was hoped the new Hispano-Suiza 8-powered SPAD VII would be able to fight the latest German fighters on better terms. The first aircraft delivered to a frontline unit was S.112 flown by Lt Sauvage of N.65, followed by S.113, assigned to Georges Guynemer of N.3. Guynemer was already credited with 15 victories at the time, but it was Armand Pinsard of N.26 who was the first to score an aerial victory on 26 August.

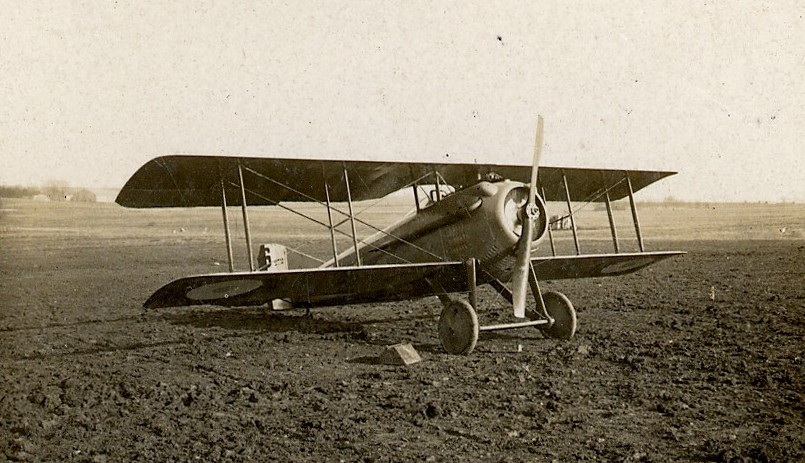
SPAD VII at Vadelaincourt in 1917

The introduction of the SPAD VII was not enough to change the balance of the air war, but it allowed both pilots and mechanics to familiarise themselves with the new fighter. Many pilots found the SPAD lacked manoeuverability, and some even returned to the nimbler Nieuports. New tactics based on speed were developed to take advantage of the SPAD's power, and to compensate for its lack of manoeuvrability. The aircraft's capacity to dive safely up to 400 km/h (250 mph) permitted the pilot to disengage from combat when the situation demanded it.

With early problems solved and production shared between several manufacturers, the SPAD VII was finally available in large numbers at the front in early 1917. By mid-1917, some 500 were in front-line service, having largely replaced the Nieuport. It gained a reputation for being stronger than its predecessors. Its principal shortcoming was its one machine gun armament at a time when the opposing Albatros D.III fighters were equipped with two. The SPAD VII was gradually replaced by the improved SPAD XIII in frontline units, but remained in use as a trainer aircraft with Aviation Militaire throughout the war, and it remained as the standard pilot certification test aircraft until 1928.

=== Foreign service ===
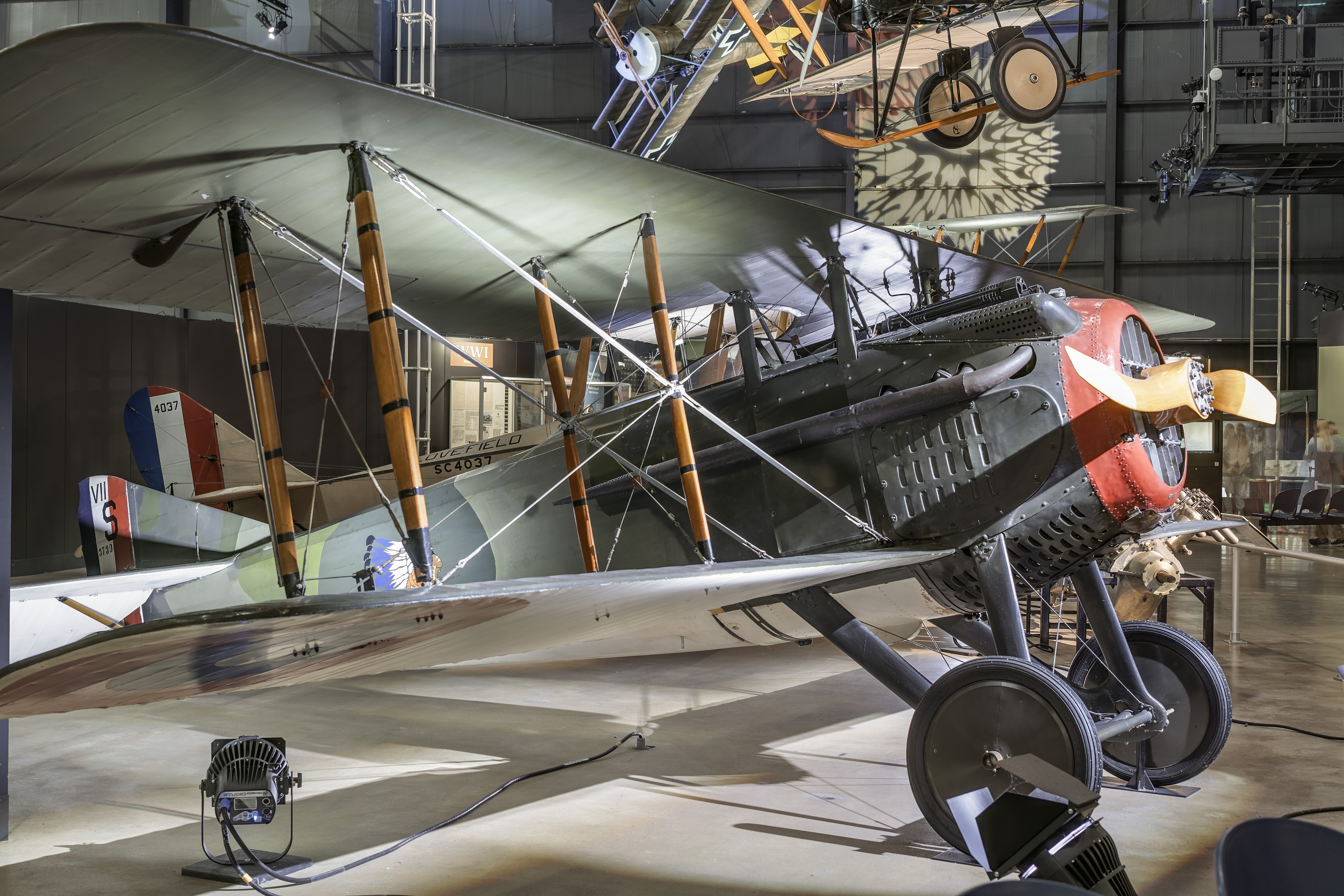
A SPAD S.VII at the National Museum of the United States Air Force near Dayton Ohio

Allied air services were also equipped with the new fighter. The Royal Flying Corps was the first foreign service to receive the SPAD VII, although only 19 Squadron and 23 Squadron) used it on the Western Front. Fighter schools in the United Kingdom and 30 Squadron in Mesopotamia also received SPADs. British-built SPADs were generally used in the training units and in the Middle East, while fighting units in France used superior French-built models. The SPAD VII was replaced by the Sopwith Dolphin in 19 Squadron in January 1918 – with No. 23 Squadron in April (becoming perhaps the last squadron to use S.VIIs in France).

Russia received a batch of 43 in spring 1917 which were supplemented by approximately 100 SPAD VII manufactured by the Dux factory under licence.

Another early user of the SPAD VII was Germany. Several were captured intact and were reportedly used both in combat and for training. Rudolf Windisch of Jasta 66 flew a SPAD VII with German markings in combat, although it is not known if any aerial victories were achieved.

Belgium equipped the 5e Escadrille (later renamed 10e Escadrille) with the S.VII. Edmond Thieffry was probably the most famous Belgian pilot to fly the type, most other aces preferring the Hanriot HD.1.

Italy began using the SPAD VII in March 1917 where nine Squadriglia were equipped with it. As was the case in other air services, pilots accustomed to more manoeuverable mounts disliked the new fighter, and again some reverted to the Nieuport 27 or the Hanriot HD.1, which eventually became the standard Italian fighter. Francesco Baracca, Italy's leading ace, was delighted with the new model, and his personal aircraft is preserved in Italy.

When the United States entered the war in 1917, an order for 189 SPAD VIIs was placed for the United States Army Air Service of the American Expeditionary Force. The first aircraft were delivered in December 1917. Most were used as advanced trainers to prepare the American pilots for the SPAD XIII.

After the war, surplus SPAD VIIs were used into the late 1920s by numerous countries, including Brazil, Czechoslovakia, Finland, Greece, Japan, the Netherlands, Peru, Poland, Portugal, Romania, Siam, the United States and Yugoslavia.

== Operators ==
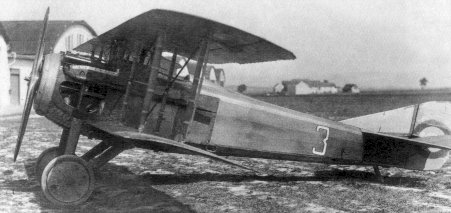
Czechoslovak SPAD S.VII

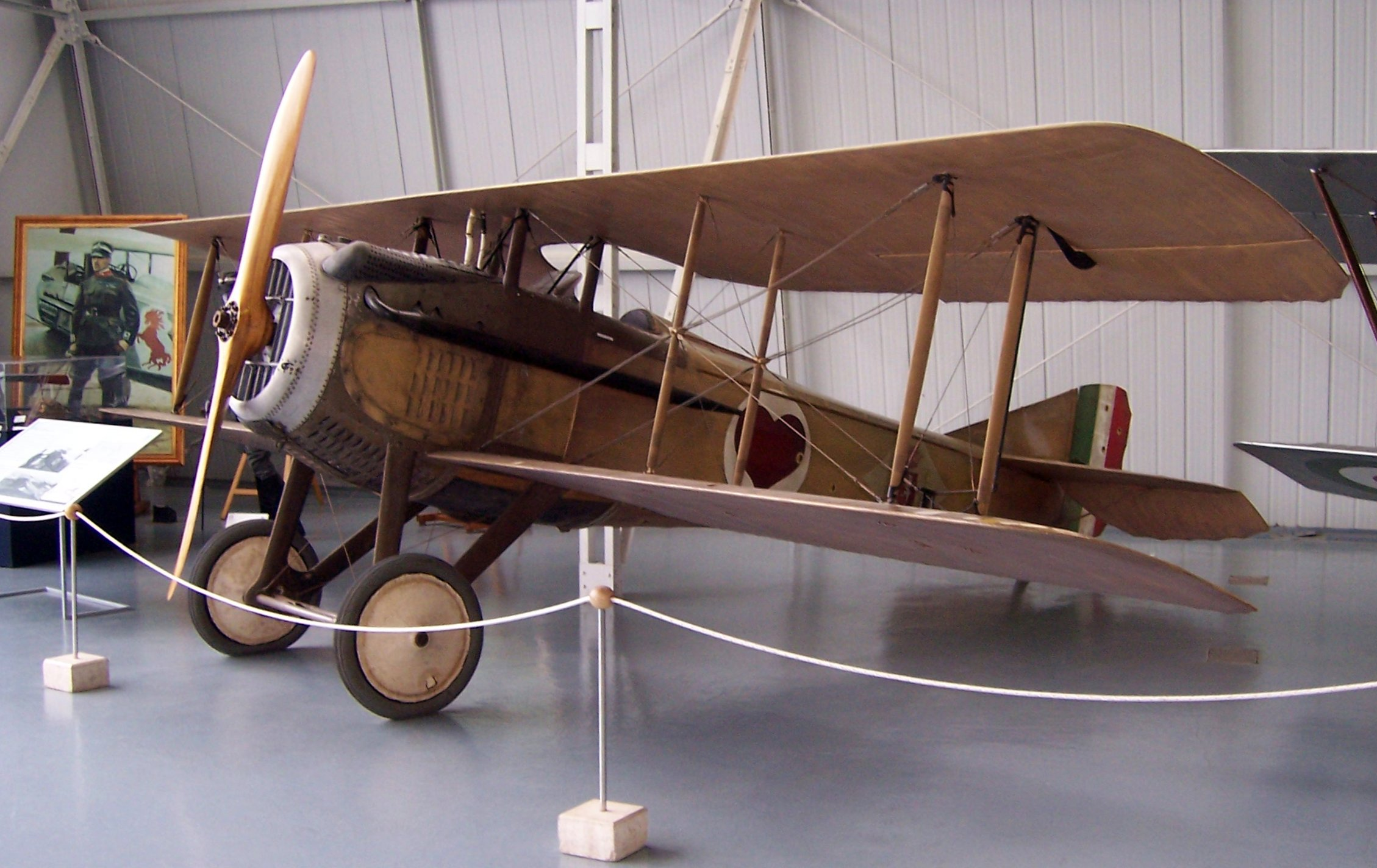
Ernesto Cabruna SPAD SVII

Argentina

- Argentine Air Force - Postwar - two aircraft.

Belgium

- Aviation Militaire Belge
  - 5me Escadrille de Chasse
- Groupe de Chasse
  - 10me Escadrille de Chasse

Brazil

- Brazilian Air Force - Postwar - 15 aircraft.

Chile

- Chilean Air Force - Postwar - one aircraft

Czechoslovakia

- Czech Air Force - Postwar - 70–80 aircraft

Estonia

- Estonian Air Force - Postwar, two aircraft

Finland

- Finnish Air Force - Postwar, one aircraft

France

- Aéronautique Militaire
  - Lafayette Escadrille
- Aéronautique Navale

Greece

- Hellenic Air Force - Postwar

Kingdom of Italy

- Corpo Aeronautico Militare - 214 aircraft
- Regia Aeronautica - Postwar

Japan

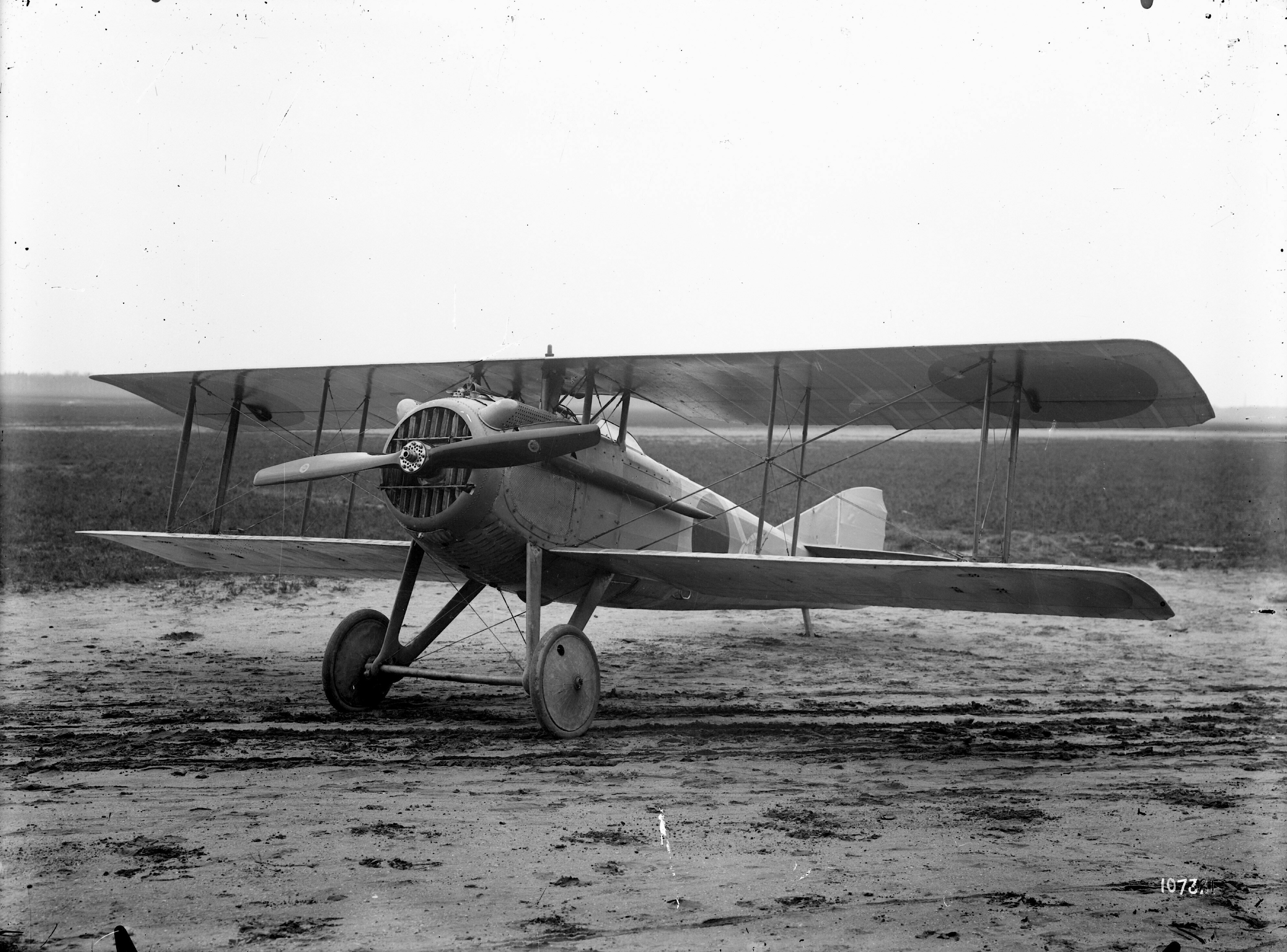
Captured Dutch SPAD S.VII.

Netherlands
- One aircraft
Peru
- Two aircraft
Poland

- Polish Air Force - Post-war

Portugal

- Portuguese Air Force

Romania

- Romanian Air Corps - Postwar

Russian Empire

- Imperial Russian Air Service - 43 aircraft

Serbia
- Postwar
Siam

- Royal Aeronautical Service - Postwar. Locally designated B.Kh.3 (Thai: บ.ข.๓).

Soviet Union

- Soviet Air Force - Postwar.

Ukrainian People's Republic

- Ukrainian People's Republic Air Fleet - Postwar - two aircraft

United Kingdom
- 185 aircraft

- Royal Air Force
- Royal Flying Corps
  - No. 17 Squadron RFC
  - No. 19 Squadron RFC
  - No. 23 Squadron RFC
  - No. 30 Squadron RFC
  - No. 63 Squadron RFC
  - No. 72 Squadron RFC
  - No. 92 Squadron RFC

Uruguay
- Two aircraft - Fighter Squadron
United States

- Aviation Section, U.S. Signal Corps
- United States Army Air Service - 189 aircraft
  - 93rd Aero Squadron
  - 103rd Aero Squadron

Yugoslavia

- Yugoslav Royal Air Force - Postwar

== Surviving aircraft ==
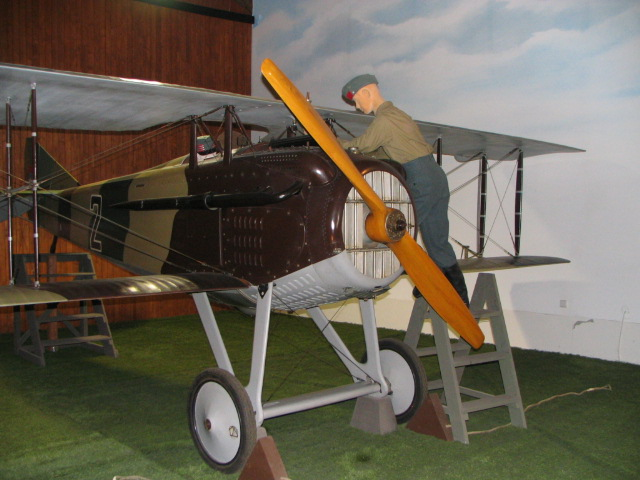
SPAD S.VII in the Praha-Kbely Airport

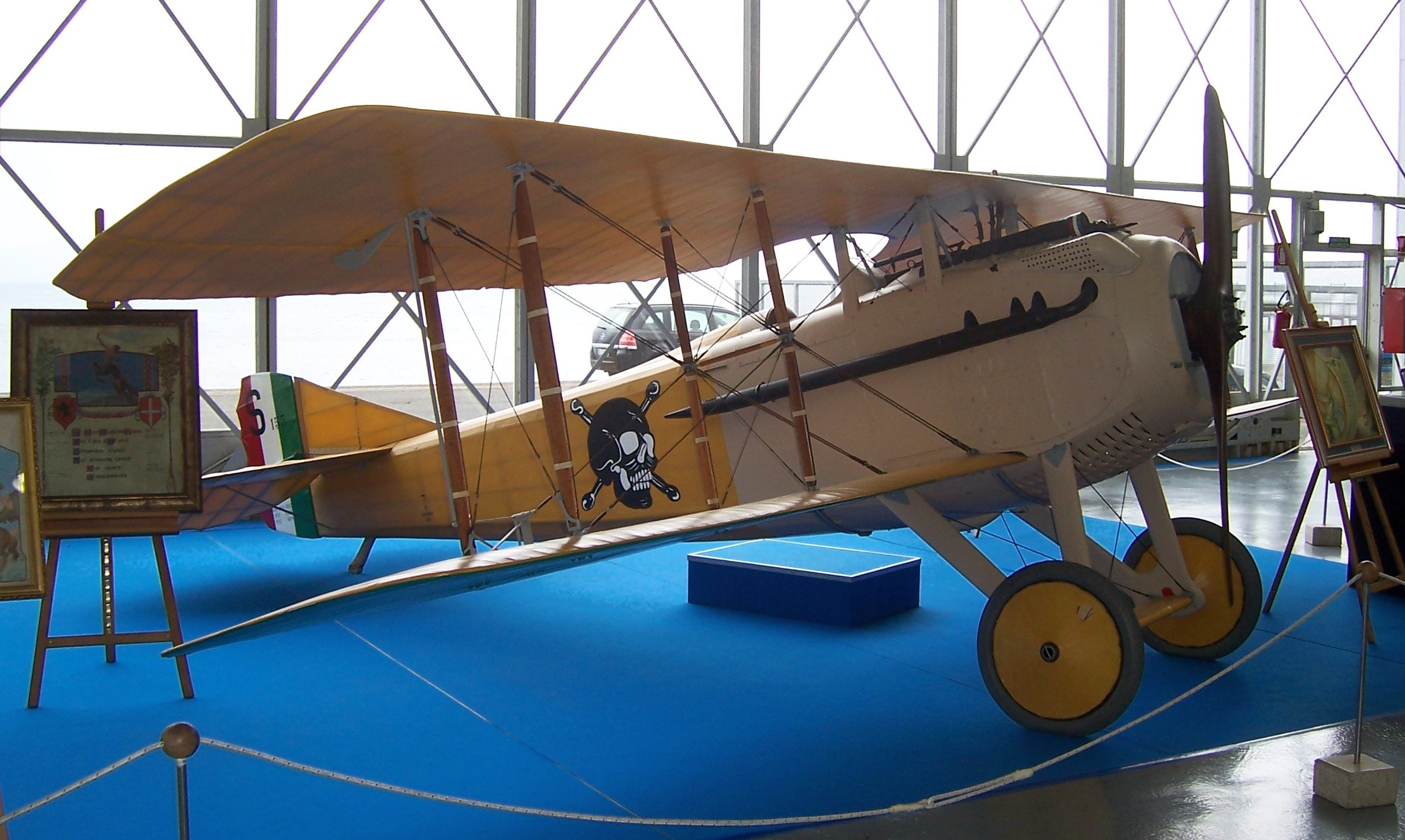
Fulco Ruffo di Calabria SPAD S.VII

Canada

- B9913 - SPAD S.VII Scout CF-RFC, on display at Canada Aviation and Space Museum in Ottawa. The airplane was built in Britain then transferred to the United States in 1918, was purchased by the museum in 1965.

Czech Republic

- 11583 – SPAD VIIC.1 on static display at the Prague Aviation Museum in Kbely, Prague. It was flown post-World War I by the Czechoslovak Air Force and then the West Bohemia Aero Club until 1930.

France

- S.254 – SPAD VII Vieux Charles on static display at the Musée de l'Air et de l'Espace in Paris, Île-de-France. Georges Guynemer scored 16 kills in this aircraft in World War I.

Italy

- S.153 – SPAD VII on static display at the Italian Air Force Museum in Bracciano, Lazio. It was flown by Fulco Ruffo di Calabria.
- Unknown – SPAD VII on static display at the Italian Air Force Museum in Bracciano, Lazio. It was flown by Ernesto Cabruna.

United States

- B9913 – SPAD VII is on display at the Shannon Air Museum in Fredericksburg, Virginia. It was one of 100 British made SPADS built in 1917 by Mann Egerton & Co. Ltd. It was fully restored in 1973.
- B9916 – SPAD VIIC.1 on static display at the San Diego Air & Space Museum in San Diego, California. Built by Mann Egerton & Co. Ltd in Norwich, England in 1917, it was one of a batch shipped to the United States for use as a trainer. The aircraft was fully restored in 1990 and is 95 percent original.
- AS 94099 – SPAD VII on static display at the National Museum of the United States Air Force in Dayton, Ohio. It was acquired from the Museum of Science and Industry and restored by the 1st Fighter Wing from 1962 to 1966.

== Specifications ==
Data from Davilla, Dr. James J.; Soltan, Arthur (1997). French Aircraft of the First World War. Mountain View, CA: Flying Machines Press. p. 493. ISBN 978-1891268090.

General characteristics

- Crew: 1
- Length: 6.080 m (19 ft 11 in)
- Wingspan: 7.822 m (25 ft 8 in)
- Height: 2.20 m (7 ft 3 in)
- Wing area: 17.85 m^{2} (192.1 sq ft)
- Empty weight: 500 kg (1,102 lb)
- Gross weight: 705 kg (1,554 lb)
- Powerplant: 1 × Hispano-Suiza 8Aa 90° V-8 liquid-cooled engine, 110 kW (150 hp)
- Propellers: 2-bladed wooden propeller

Performance

- Maximum speed: 193 km/h (120 mph, 104 kn) at sea level
  - 187 km/h (116 mph; 101 kn) at 2,000 m (6,600 ft)
  - 180 km/h (110 mph; 97 kn) at 3,000 m (9,800 ft)
  - 174 km/h (108 mph; 94 kn) at 4,000 m (13,000 ft)
- Range: 400 km (250 mi, 220 nmi)
- Endurance: 2.66 hours
- Service ceiling: 5,500 m (18,000 ft)
- Time to altitude:
  - 6 minutes 40 seconds to 2,000 m (6,600 ft)
  - 11 minutes 20 seconds to 3,000 m (9,800 ft)

Armament

- Guns: * 1 × 7.7 mm (.303 in) Vickers machine gun

== See also ==
Related development

- Deperdussin Monocoque
- SPAD S.A.
- SPAD S.XI
- SPAD S.XII
- SPAD S.XIII

Aircraft of comparable role, configuration, and era )

- Albatros D.II
- Fokker D.IV
- Nieuport 23
- Sopwith Pup
