= Ferruccio Ranza =

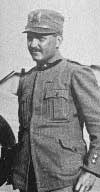
- Born: 9 September 1892; Fiorenzuola d'Arda, Kingdom of Italy
- Died: 25 April 1973 (aged 80); Bologna, Italy
- Military career
- Allegiance: Italy
- Branch: Engineer; aviation
- Service years: 1914–1945
- Rank: Tenente (later Brigadier General)
- Units: 43a Squadriglia, 77a Squadriglia
- Commands: 91a Squadriglia
- Awards: Three Silver and two Bronze awards of Medal for Military Valor, Military Order of Savoy, French Croix de Guerre and Croix de Guerre (Belgium), Serbian Order of Karageorge
- Other work: Rose to several different high commands during 1930s and World War II

Brigadier General Ferruccio Ranza (9 September 1892—25 April 1973) began his military career as a World War I flying ace credited with seventeen confirmed victories and eight unconfirmed ones. Postwar, he rose to command of several area commands of the resurgent Italian Air Force. He served through the end of World War II.

== Biography ==
=== Early life ===
Ferruccio Ranza was born on 9 September 1892 in Fiorenzuola d'Arda, the Kingdom of Italy.

=== World War I service ===
Ranza was a Sottotenente in the engineers when World War I broke out, being assigned on 8 November 1914 as a lieutenant in 1st Engineer Regiment. He attended the flight school at Venaria. His first assignment, on 14 October 1915, was to 43a Squadriglia to fly reconnaissance missions. He won a Bronze award of the Medal for Military Valor for carrying out an artillery spotting mission under heavy fire on 1 April 1916.

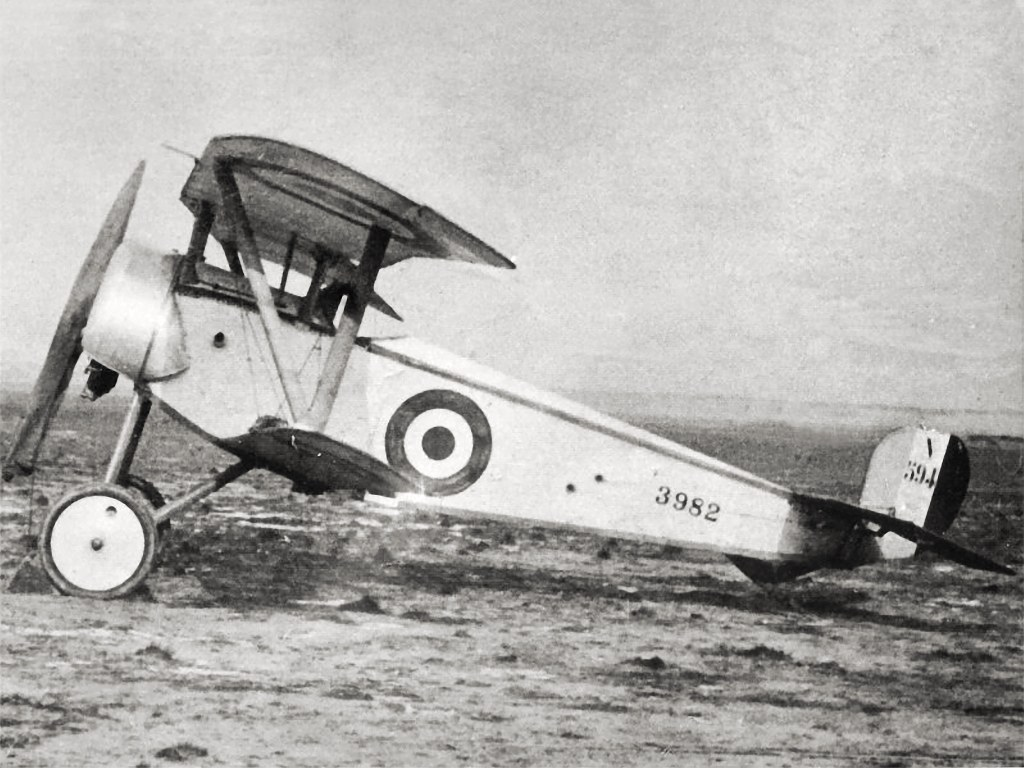
A Nieuport 11 in Italian livery.

However, Ranza had no success in aerial warfare until he transitioned to Nieuports and joined 77a Squadriglia on 22 June 1916. Five days later, flying a Nieuport 11, he downed a Hansa-Brandenburg C.I. On 14 September 1916, he shot down a seaplane and received another Bronze award. By 25 November, he had four confirmed wins and one unconfirmed. He made another unconfirmed claim on 4 April 1917.

Fulco Ruffo di Calabria was removed from command of 91a Squadriglia because of combat fatigue; Ranza was appointed to succeed him in command, on 1 May 1917, while still flying with 77a Squadriglia through June. Ranza scored again on 23 June 1917, and would continue to score through the end of the war, with his last claims being two unconfirmed victories on 29 October 1918. He would be awarded two more Silver Medals for Military Valor. Ranza ended World War I having flown 465 combat sorties and had posted 20 aerial victory claims. In the process, he was promoted to captain. During the war, he had won three Silver awards of the Medal for Military Valor, the Serbian Order of the Star of Karađorđe, four war crosses (two Italian, one French, one Belgian), and the Military Order of Savoy.

=== Post World War I ===
The Bongiovanni military intelligence commission verified 17 of Ranza's victory claims in their report of 1 February 1919.

Ranza remained in the Italian Air Force postwar. In February 1924, he took command of the 13th Group. On 15 April 1927, he stepped up to command of 2nd Wing. He rose to command of Italian air assets in Tripolitania, in 1928, then returned to Italy as Chief of Staff for 1st Zone Air Place. From January to September 1935, he returned to Italian East Africa being promoted in March to Brigadier General. In May 1939, he moved to become Air Officer Commanding in Albania. The following year, he was appointed AOC Southern Italy. Ranza retired on 29 January 1945. He died in Bologna, Italy on 25 April 1973.
