= List of World War I flying aces from Italy =

This list contains a complete list of all World War I flying aces who flew for the Kingdom of Italy.

A military intelligence committee, the Bongiovanni Commission, verified the aerial victories of Italian aviators during World War I and released its listing of Corpo Aeronautico Militare flying aces on 1 February 1919. The Bongiovanni report served as the basic source for this list. Additions, and later adjustments in victory scores, are cited separately below.

== The Bongiovanni Commission list ==
Name	Victories
Francesco Baracca	34
Silvio Scaroni	26
Pier Ruggero Piccio	24
Flavio Baracchini	21
Fulco Ruffo di Calabria	20
Marziale Cerutti	17
Ferruccio Ranza	17
Luigi Olivari	12
Giovanni Ancillotto	11
Antonio Reali	11
Flaminio Avet	8
Ernesto Cabruna	8
Alvaro Leonardi	8
Carlo Lombardi	8
Giovanni Nicelli	8
Gastone Novelli	8
Leopoldo Eleuteri	7
Guglielmo Fornagiari	7
Mario Fucini	7
Orazio Pierozzi	7
Cosimo Rennella (Note: Ecuadorian citizen)	7
Antonio Riva	7
Aldo Bocchese	6
Antonio Chiri	6
Bartolomeo Costantini	6
Attilio Imolesi	6
Cesare Magistrini	6
Guido Nardini	6
Luigi Olivari	6
Giorgio Pessi (Note: Austro-Hungarian citizen)	6
Cosimo Rizzotto	6
Mario Stoppani	6
Romolo Ticconi	6
Michele Allasia	5
Antonio Amantea	5
Sebastiano Bedendo	5
Alessandro Buzio	5
Umberto Calvello	5
Giulio Lega	5
Federico Martinengo	5
Guido Masiero	5
Amedeo Mecozzi	5
Giorgio Michetti	5
Alessandro Resch	5
Giovanni Sabelli	5
