= Lists of World War I flying aces =

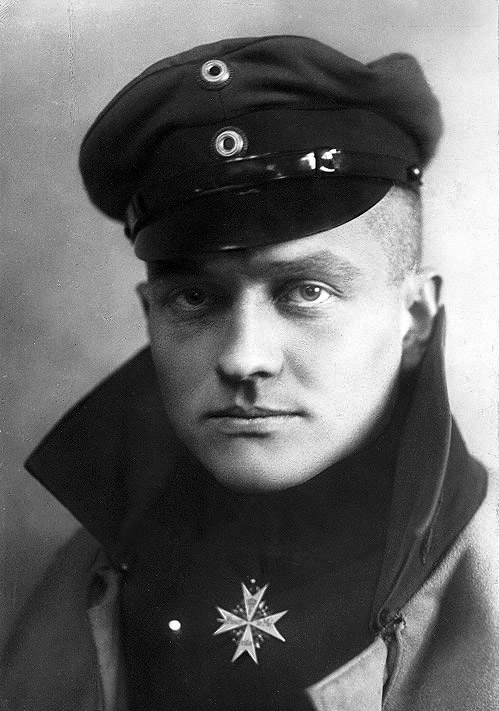
German ace Manfred von Richthofen known as the Red Baron

The following are lists of World War I flying aces. Historically, a flying ace was defined as a military aviator credited with shooting down five or more enemy aircraft during aerial combat. The term was first used by French newspapers, describing Adolphe Pégoud as l'as (the ace), after he downed seven German aircraft.

== Aerial victory standards of World War I ==
The notion of an aerial "victory" arose from the first aerial combats, which occurred during the early days of World War I. Different air services developed their own definitions of exactly what an aerial victory might be, as well as different methods of assessing and assigning credit for aerial victories. All standards had accuracy flaws that led to overclaiming aerial victories. Former Wings editor Wayne Ralph (2008) observed: 'In the First World War, the Second World War and also the Korean War, overclaiming was common; it varied by theatre, nation and individual, but it was inevitable.'

Ownership of the terrain below had its effect on verifying victory. An enemy aircraft that crashed in enemy held territory obviously could not be verified by the victor's ground troops. Because aerial combat commonly took place over or behind the German lines, German scores are generally considered more accurate because German aces' victories were more easily confirmed on the ground. Additionally, the British handicap of returning home against prevailing wind on the Western Front fattened German scores.

The scores presented in the lists cannot be definitive, but are based on itemized lists that are the best available sources of information. Loss of records by mischance and the passage of time complicates reconstructing the actual count for given aces.

== Lists ==
Aces are listed after verifying the date and location of combat, and the foe vanquished, for every victory accredited by an aviator's home air service.

- List of World War I flying aces from Argentina
- List of World War I aces from Australia
- List of World War I flying aces from Austria
- List of World War I flying aces from Austria-Hungary
- List of World War I aces from Belgium
- List of World War I flying aces from the British Empire
- List of World War I aces from Canada
- List of World War I flying aces from Croatia
- List of World War I Czech flying aces
- List of World War I aces from Ecuador
- List of World War I flying aces from Estonia
- List of World War I aces from Fiji
- List of World War I flying aces from France
- List of World War I aces from Georgia
- List of World War I flying aces from Germany
- List of World War I aces from Greece
- List of World War I flying aces from Hungary
- List of World War I flying aces from India
- List of World War I aces from Italy
- List of World War I aces from Latvia
- List of World War I aces from New Zealand
- List of World War I aces from Poland
- List of World War I flying aces from Romania
- List of World War I flying aces from the Russian Empire
- List of World War I flying aces from Serbia
- List of World War I Slovak flying aces
- List of World War I flying aces from Swaziland
- List of World War I aces from Switzerland
- List of World War I flying aces from the United States

== See also ==
- Blue Max
- Sanke card
- List of World War II flying aces
- List of World War I aces credited with 20 or more victories
