= Antonio Riva (pilot) =

Italian flying ace (1896–1951)

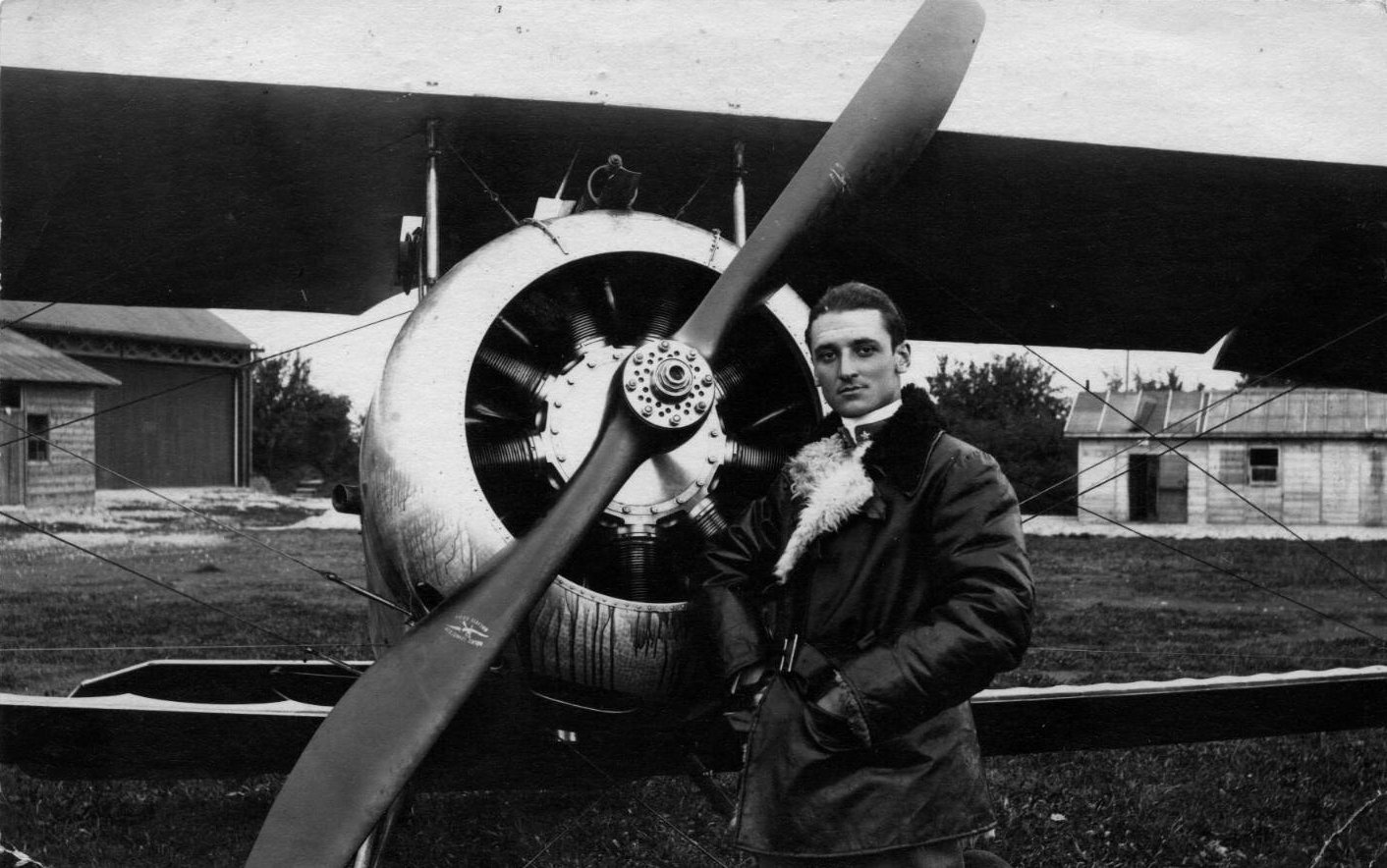
- Antonio Riva during World War I
- Born: 8 April 1896; Shanghai, Qing Empire
- Died: 17 August 1951 (aged 55); Beijing, People's Republic of China
- Military career
- Allegiance: Kingdom of Italy
- Branch: Corpo Aeronautico Militare
- Rank: Capitano (captain)
- Units: 71a Squadriglia, 78a Squadriglia
- Awards: Medal for Military Valor
- Other work: Executed by Chinese Communists for "counter-revolutionary activities".

Antonio Riva (Chinese: 李安東; pinyin: Lǐ Āndōng; 8 April 1896 – 17 August 1951) was an Italian pilot and a World War I flying ace, credited with seven confirmed and seven unconfirmed aerial victories. In 1951, he was executed by firing squad under the newly established People's Republic of China for allegedly conspiring to assassinate Mao Zedong and other Communist leaders.

== Early life and infantry service ==
Antonio Riva was born in Shanghai, China on 8 April 1896 from a family of wealthy merchants from Gorgonzola, Achille Riva and Teresa Barbaran Capra; the couple moved to China in 1880 to export silk in Italy. Being of Italian heritage, he returned to Italy as World War I engulfed Europe. He volunteered as a reserve officer on 31 December 1914, before Italy entered the war. On 11 July 1915, he was commissioned a Sottotenente in the Italian Army's 70th Infantry Regiment. On 12 November 1915, he was wounded, not returning to duty until 16 March 1916. He was transferred to the 201st Infantry Regiment on 15 June 1916; on 30 June he was once again wounded in action. He returned to the front with the 44th Infantry Regiment on 22 August 1916. The next month, he went on leave; upon his return, he found himself bucked to the 49th Infantry Regiment. However, on 25 September 1916, he was accepted for pilot's training at San Giusto.

== World War I aerial service ==
Riva became a Tenente (Lieutenant) while in aviation training; his promotion was effective 25 February 1917. He completed his training in April 1917, while stationed in Foggia. His first assignment was to a reconnaissance two-seater unit, 29a Squadriglia. After just 12 sorties with them, he undertook fighter conversion training on Nieuports in June 1917. In July, he underwent gunnery school at San Giusto. On 19 July, he was posted to a fighter squadron, 73a Squadriglia. He transferred out to 71a Squadriglia at the end of July.

Riva began his successes while flying a Nieuport 11 with this fighter squadron when he shared a victory with Antonio Amantea and another Italian pilot. The trio shot down Austro-Hungarian ace Julius Kowalczik in his Albatros D.III on 24 August 1917. Riva was promoted to Capitano on 31 October 1917. He switched over to command 78a Squadriglia on 12 November 1917 and changed mounts to a Hanriot HD.1. His next successes came on 26 December 1917, when he shot down a DFW reconnaissance plane solo, followed by a second win over another DFW, shared with Silvio Scaroni and three British pilots. A month later, on 27 January 1918, Riva teamed with Guglielmo Fornagiari for a fourth victory. On 15 June 1918, Riva became an ace. He and Amedeo Mecozzi teamed to down a Hansa-Brandenburg C.I. After a string of five unconfirmed claims, he would down two more planes in 1918, to bring his total to seven; he had an equal number of unconfirmed claims. Riva was assigned on 10 September 1918 as commanding officer to form a new squadron, 90a Squadriglia, equipped with a new fighter aircraft, the SVA 5. During this assignment, he continued to fly, and post his victory claims with, 78a Squadriglia. Antonio Riva ended World War I having been awarded the Silver Medal for Military Valor and the Knight's Cross of the Military Order of Savoy.

== List of aerial victories ==
Confirmed victories are numbered and listed chronologically. Unconfirmed victories are denoted by "u/c" and may or may not be listed by date.

| No. | Date/time | Aircraft | Foe | Result | Location | Notes |
|---|---|---|---|---|---|---|
| 1 | 24 August 1917 | Nieuport 11 | Albatros D.III serial number 53.33 | Destroyed | Forte Luserna | Victory over Julius Kowalczik KIA shared with Antonio Amantea and another aviator |
| 2 | 26 December 1917 | Hanriot HD.1 | DFW reconnaissance plane s/n G128 | Destroyed | Signoressa | |
| 3 | 26 December 1917 @ 0920 hours | Hanriot HD.1 | DFW reconnaissance plane | Destroyed | Camalo | Victory shared with Silvio Scaroni, Arthur Jarvis, two other RFC pilots |
| 4 | 27 January 1918 | Hanriot HD.1 | Enemy airplane | Destroyed | San Marino | Victory shared with Guglielmo Fornagiari |
| u/c | 1 May 1918 | Hanriot HD.1 | Enemy airplane | | Cimadolmo | Cosimo Rennella was also involved |
| 5 | 15 June 1918 @ 1000 hours | Hanriot HD.1 | Hansa-Brandenburg C.I | Destroyed | Between Montello and Nervesa della Battaglia | Victory shared with Amedeo Mecozzi |
| u/c | 16 June 1918 @ 1030 hours | Hanriot HD.I | Hansa-Brandenburg C.I | | Between Malborghetto Valbruna and Fontigo | Mario Fucini and another Italian aviator were also involved |
| u/c | 16 June 1918 | Hanriot HD.I | Enemy airplane | | Pillonetto | |
| u/c | 12 August 1918 | Hanriot HD.I | DFW reconnaissance plane | | Santa Lucia di Piave | |
| u/c | 6 October 1918 @ 1550 hours | Hanriot HD.I | DFW reconnaissance plane | | Susegana | Amadeo Mecozzi and another Italian aviator were involved |
| u/c | 6 October 1918 @ 1550 hours | Hanriot HD.I | Albatros D.V | | Susegana | |
| 6 | 27 October 1918 @ 1620 hours | Hanriot HD.I | Enemy two-seater | | Pieve di Soligo | Victory shared with another Italian aviator |
| u/c | 28 October 1918 | Hanriot HD.I | LVG | | Between Pederobba and Grave di Papadopoli | |
| 7 | 29 October 1918 @ 0729 | Hanriot HD.I | Hansa-Brandenburg C.I s/n 369.175 | Destroyed | Oderzo | Another Italian aviator was involved |

== Post World War I ==
On 1 February 1919, the Bongiovanni commission review of the aerial victories of the Italian Army's pilots confirmed seven of Antonio Riva's aerial victory claims. In 1920, Riva was stationed in China, placed in charge of the Chinese stopovers for a Rome to Tokyo flight. He was discharged in January 1921.

Little is known of the next couple of decades, except that Riva remained in the Reserves of the Regia Aeronautica as late as February 1935. In 1936 he married Catherine Lum, older daughter of American artist Bertha Lum. They had four children.

=== Death ===
Antonio was executed in Beijing, People's Republic of China, by a firing squad in 1951, along with a Japanese citizen, Ruichi Yamaguchi. They were convicted of being involved in a plot to assassinate Mao Zedong and other high-ranking Communist officials. The plot allegedly involved attacking Mao and other officials atop Tiananmen Gate with a mortar on 1 October 1950, during National Day celebrations.

However, there were several issues with the plot. Most obviously, the idea that two foreigners could carry a mortar all the way to Tiananmen Square during a large celebration seems highly improbable. The mortar seized from Riva's house was a nonfunctional part of an antique from the 1930s which could not have been used to attack anyone. Riva had found the antique in a junk pile outside the Holy See legation. Tarcisio Martina, the priest whose house was next to the other parts of the mortar, was sentenced to life imprisonment, although he was released and deported three years later. A map of the square seized from Yamaguchi's house and used as evidence was actually commissioned by the Beijing Fire Department, to whom Yamaguchi was selling firefighting equipment. It was alleged that the ringleader of the plot was an American serviceman named David D. Barrett, but he was simply a neighbor to the two who had moved out a year before. In any case, the incident was used to banish the Holy See from China. Two decades later, PRC prime minister Zhou Enlai apologized to Barrett and invited him back to China.
