= Flaminio Avet =

Italian flying ace (1890–1928)

- Born: 3 August 1890; Nice, France
- Died: 21 August 1928 (aged 38); Nice, France
- Military career
- Allegiance: Kingdom of Italy
- Branch: Corpo Aeronautico Militare
- Rank: Tenente
- Unit: 73a Squadriglia,
- Awards: Three awards of the Silver Medal for Military Valor

Flaminio Avet was a World War I flying ace credited with eight aerial victories. Although born in Nice, France, he served in the Italian military as Italy entered World War I. After a transfer from Lancers to aviation, he trained as a pilot. He began his aerial combat career on 27 November 1918, and would stake a dozen victory claims, eight of which would be verified. He ended the war having won the Silver Medal for Military Valor three times. He returned to Nice postwar, and died there on 21 August 1928.

== Early life and ground service ==
Flaminio Avet was born in Nice, France on 3 August 1890. Despite being born in France, he joined Italy's 9th "Firenze" Lancers Regiment as an officer as World I heated up.

== Aerial service in World War I ==
Avet transferred to aviation in early 1916; he made his first flight in a Blériot on 25 May 1916. On 9 September 1916, he was granted his pilot's wings; on 15 November, he gained his military pilot's brevet. On 1 January 1917, he qualified on Aviatiks. On 3 February 1917, he was posted to 73a Squadriglia as a two-seater pilot. He flew his first combat sortie on 14 March 1917.

After he gained experience, he was sent to Malpensa for conversion training on Nieuport 17 fighters on 31 August 1917. After that, he went to gunnery training at San Giusto before doubling back to Malpensa for training on the SIA 7. On 1 November 1917, he was posted to a temporary assignment commanding 82a Squadriglia for a fortnight. He staked his first victory claim while serving in this squadron.

He was transferred to 70a Squadriglia and would serve with them through war's end, except for another short spell as 82a Squadriglia's commander in June and July 1918. During the latter part of the war, from May to October 1918, he posted another eleven claims for combat victories, all scored while in 70a Squadriglia. His last victory was shared with 2 other pilots (Eleuteri and Bocchese). Though the guns of all three pilots were jammed, "they forced with their presence alone an Austrian airman to give himself up and land at Arcade".^{[4]} A black cross from this aircraft was later souvenired and framed by Avet, which presently survives today. Tenente Flaminio Avet ended the war having thrice been awarded the Silver Medal for Military Valor.

== List of aerial victories ==
See also Aerial victory standards of World War I

Confirmed victories are numbered and listed chronologically. Unconfirmed victories are denoted by "u/c" and may or may not be listed by date.

No.	Date/time	Aircraft	Foe	Result	Location	Notes
u/c	27 April 1917	SAML	Enemy aircraft		Val d'Arsa	
1	17 April 1918		Enemy two-seater		Valdobbiadene	Victory shared with Alessandro Resch, Aldo Bocchese, Leopoldo Eleuteri
u/c	17 April 1918		Enemy fighter		Valdobbiadene	Victory shared with Alessandro Resch, Aldo Bocchese, Leopoldo Eleuteri
u/c	17 April 1918		Enemy fighter		Valdobbiadene	Victory shared with Alessandro Resch, Aldo Bocchese, Leopoldo Eleuteri
2	25 April 1918		Enemy fighter		Conegliano	Shared victory
3	25 April 1918		Enemy fighter		Conegliano	Shared victory
4	3 May 1918		Enemy fighter		Zenson di Piave	
5	17 May 1918 @ 0958 hours		Enemy Fighter		Maserada sul Piave	Victory shared with Cosimo Rennella, Mario Fucini
6	15 July 1918		Enemy aircraft		Montello	Victory shared with Bocchese, Eleuteri
7	Circa 4 October 1918	Spad VII	Albatros D.V		Grave di Papadopoli	
8	8 October 1918		Albatros D.III		Santa Lucia di Piave	Victory shared with Eleuteri
u/c	28 October 1918		Enemy aircraft		Arcade, Italy	Victory shared with Bocchese, Eleuteri

== Post World War I ==
On 1 February 1919, the Bongiovanni report from Italy's military intelligence confirmed eight of Avet's victories. Avet returned to Nice, France, where he died on 21 August 1928.

== Endnotes ==
4. Gentilli et al., 2003, p89.
