= Aldo Bocchese =

Italian flying ace (1894–1976)

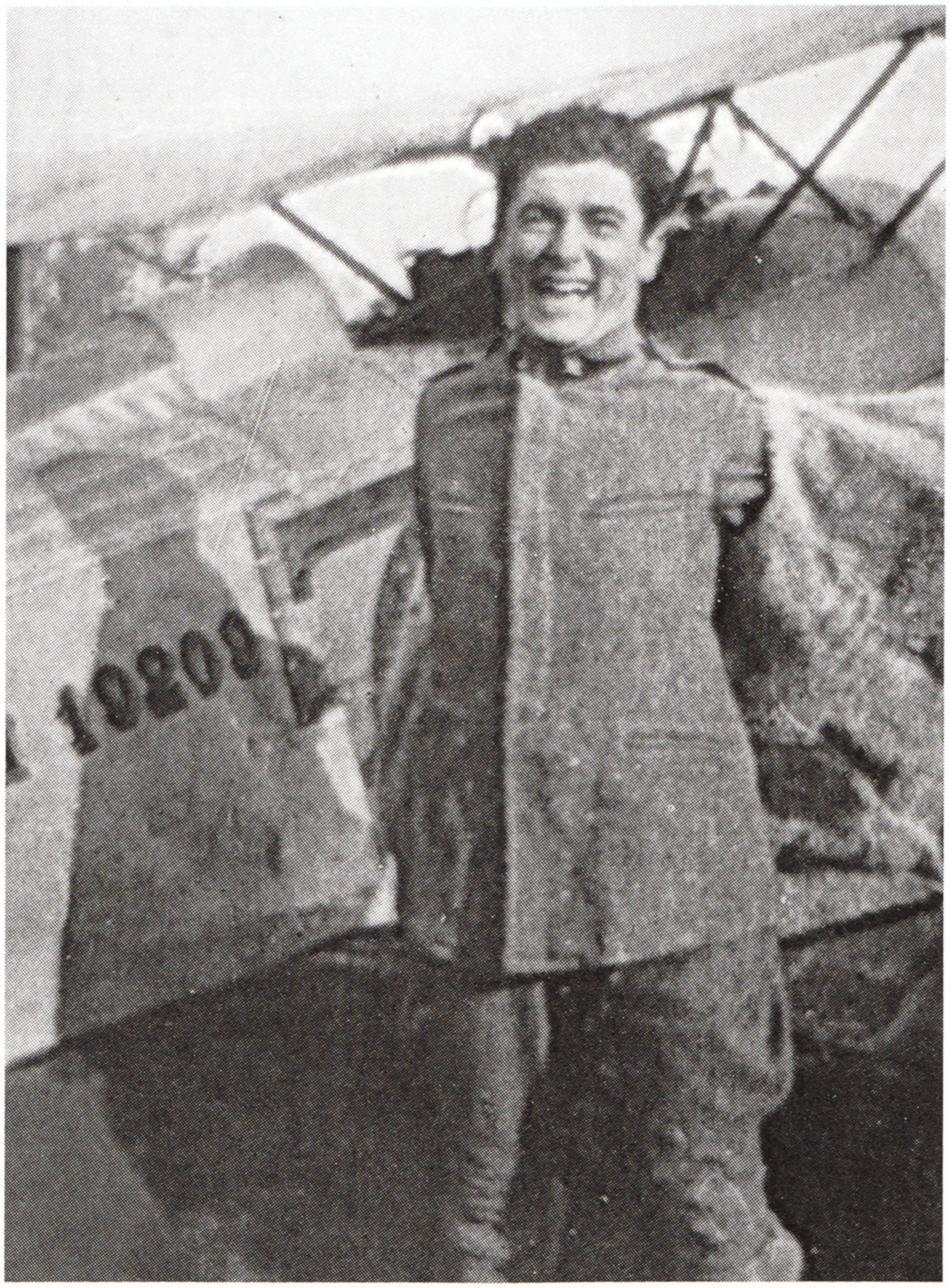
- Born: 23 December 1894; Milan, Kingdom of Italy
- Died: 19 March 1976 (aged 81); Florence, Italy
- Military career
- Allegiance: Italy
- Branch: Aviation
- Rank: Sergente Maggiore
- Unit: 70a Squadriglia
- Awards: Two Bronze awards of the Medal for Military Valor

Sergente Maggiore Aldo Bocchese was a World War I flying ace credited with six aerial victories.

== Biography ==
Aldo Bocchese was born in Milan, the Kingdom of Italy on 23 December 1894. When he reported for duty in World War I, his original military service was with his nation's 49th Infantry Regiment. Ranked as a sergente, he transferred to aviation and began training as a pilot at Cascina Costa on 7 March 1917. On 29 August 1917, he was granted his initial license. He earned four more advanced ratings, including one on Nieuports, and began gunnery training at Furbara on 7 December 1917. Upon graduation, he was assigned to 70a Squadriglia, with whom he would fly 119 combat sorties.

On 17 April 1918, Bocchese, Leopoldo Eleuteri, Flaminio Avet, and Alessandro Resch were credited with downing a two-seater and two fighter planes over Valdobbiadene for Bocchese's first three victories. Avet and Eleuteri also aided Bocchese in his next two victories, on 15 July and 28 October 1918.

A postwar committee from Italian military intelligence adjudged all aerial victories postwar. On 1 February 1919, in their released report on aerial victories, they awarded Bocchese six confirmed aerial victories. Also in 1919, Aldo Bocchese was discharged from service as a sergente maggiore with two Bronze awards of the Medal for Military Valor.

In 1963, Bocchese moved from Milan to Signa. He died in Florence on 19 March 1976.
