= Calvello (surname) =

Calvello is an Italian surname. Notable people with the surname include:

- Ann Calvello (1929–2006), American athlete
- Jessica Calvello (born 1973), American voice actress and production assistant
- Umberto Calvello (1897–1919), Italian pilot

== See also ==
- Calvelli, another surname
