= Rennella =

Rennella is an Italian surname. Notable people with the surname include:

- Cosimo Rennella (1890–1937), Ecuadorian World War I flying ace
- Vincenzo Rennella (born 1988), French-born Italian footballer
