= Julius Kowalczik =

Austro-Hungarian World War I flying ace

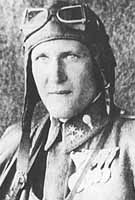
- Born: 1885; Moravská Ostrava, Austria-Hungary (now Czech Republic)
- Died: Unknown
- Military career
- Allegiance: Austro-Hungarian Empire
- Branch: Austro-Hungarian Aviation Troops
- Rank: Offiziersstellvertreter
- Units: Flik 15, Flik 24
- Awards: 2 Gold and 2 Silver awards of Medal for Bravery

Julius Kowalczik (1885-date unknown) was an Austro-Hungarian World War I flying ace credited with five aerial victories. Though he joined military service as the war began in 1914, he did not transfer to the Austro-Hungarian Aviation Troops until late 1915. Qualified as a fighter pilot in February 1916, he went into action in northern Italy the following month. He would score five aerial victories between 14 October 1916 and 29 June 1917. After surviving being shot down by Italian aces Antonio Amantea and Antonio Riva on 24 August 1917, Kowalczik was reassigned to instructor duty in January 1918. He survived the war, having won two Silver and two Gold Medals for Bravery.

== Biography ==
Julius Kowalczik was born in 1885. Although he was born in Moravská Ostrava in the present-day Czech Republic, he was of Sudeten German heritage.

He joined the Austro-Hungarian military as World War I began in 1914. In late 1915, he received a transfer to aerial service to train as a pilot. On 16 February 1916, he was granted Austrian Pilot's Certificate No. 326. In March he was promoted to corporal and posted to Flik 15. He flew enough missions with this composite squadron in northern Italy that he earned his Field Pilot's Badge.

In early May 1916, he was transferred to a newly formed unit, Flik 24, at Pergine Airfield. There he joined future aces József Kiss and Georg Kenzian. Although Kowalczik scored no aerial victories, his flying performance brought him a promotion to sergeant and a Silver Medal for Bravery, 2nd Class the following month.

On 14 October 1916, Kowalczik and his observer shot down an Italian Farman two-seater for his first victory. It exploded upon impact near Pergine. In November, he received the highest award available to an enlisted man, the Gold Medal for Bravery.

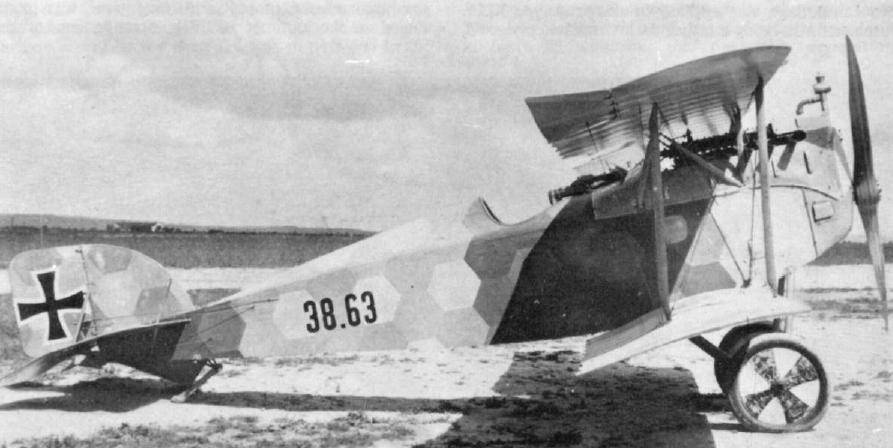
The Berg D.I, also known as the Aviatik D.I

Kowalczik's next victories came on 18 March 1917. At 1000 hours, he and his observer shot an Italian Farman down in flames. At 1015, the Austro-Hungarians forced a Voisin to land. Although it is unclear if the awards came before or after these two victories, Kowalczik received a second award of the Silver Medal for Bravery, 2nd Class, as well as the Silver Medal for Bravery, 1st Class. It was also about this time that he went for fighter pilot's training. He qualified on both Albatros and Berg D.I fighters.

On 10 June 1917, Kowalczik joined two other Austro-Hungarian pilots in an attack on an Italian Caproni three-engined bomber. He received the major credit in sending the huge bomber down in flames. Ten days later, he shot down an Italian Caudron two-seater to become an ace. Also in June, he received a rare second award of the Gold Medal for Bravery.

On 24 August 1917, Kowalczik was shot down by Antonio Riva and Antonio Amantea. He successfully crash-landed his Albatros D.III in Val D'Astico.

Kowalczik was so highly thought of that on 20 December 1917, he was deemed fit to be a Offizierstellvertreter (officer candidate). However, he was not commissioned. In January 1918, he was transferred from combat duty to become an instructor. In this assignment, he survived the war.
