= Altaneve =

Italian sparkling wine

Altaneve is an Italian sparkling wine made from Glera grapes from the Italian Dolomites.

== History ==
Altaneve derives from Valdobbiadene in the Veneto region of Italy, an area known for producing the highest quality Prosecco wines since 30 BC. It is noted that this type of wine was a favorite of Empress Livia Augusta. David Noto, whose family has over 10 generations of wine-making history, founded the brand after his previous careers as an engineer. in Italy and a Technology Manager for a New York City finance firm. Noto officially dedicated his career to building his prosecco brand in 2013.

== Style ==
The brand is produced in “small quantity but high quality.” Altaneve Prosecco shares a hint of “golden hues” and has a floral bouquet scent with a touch of “soft citrus.”

== Product and the Media ==
In July 2014, David Noto was featured on FOX5 Good Day New York, explaining the differences and qualities in Prosecco; he also demonstrated how to mix Prosecco into seasonal cocktails on the show. In August 2014, Altaneve was featured on Bloomberg TV where the prosecco brand gave insight on “Why Prosecco Sales Are Bubbling to the Top.” David Noto also made an appearance on Fox Business Channel, where he provided tips on choosing the right Prosecco. The Daily News featured Altaneve as a “Hand it to Mom” gift idea for Mother’s Day 2014, and InStyle Magazine, as well as HGTV, shared the Altaneve inspired prosecco cocktails called Pomegranate Mint Spritz. Glam also made an Altaneve cocktail recipe that included St. Germain and strawberries. In September 2014, the Wine Spector featured Altaneve in an article on prosecco becoming a "trend-wine." In June, New York Newsday ranked Altaneve one of the "best drinks for summer." Most recently, Altaneve was reviewed by Arthur Shapiro of the BoozeBusiness.com blog.
