= List of World War I aces from Ecuador =

Military aviation was not officially established in Ecuador until 27 October 1920. However, one of its aviation pioneers was an Ecuadorian of Italian heritage and served in Italian aviation in the Corpo Aeronautico Militare during World War I and became a flying ace.

- Cosimo Rennella – 7 confirmed aerial victories.
