= Antonio Chiri =

Italian World War I flying ace

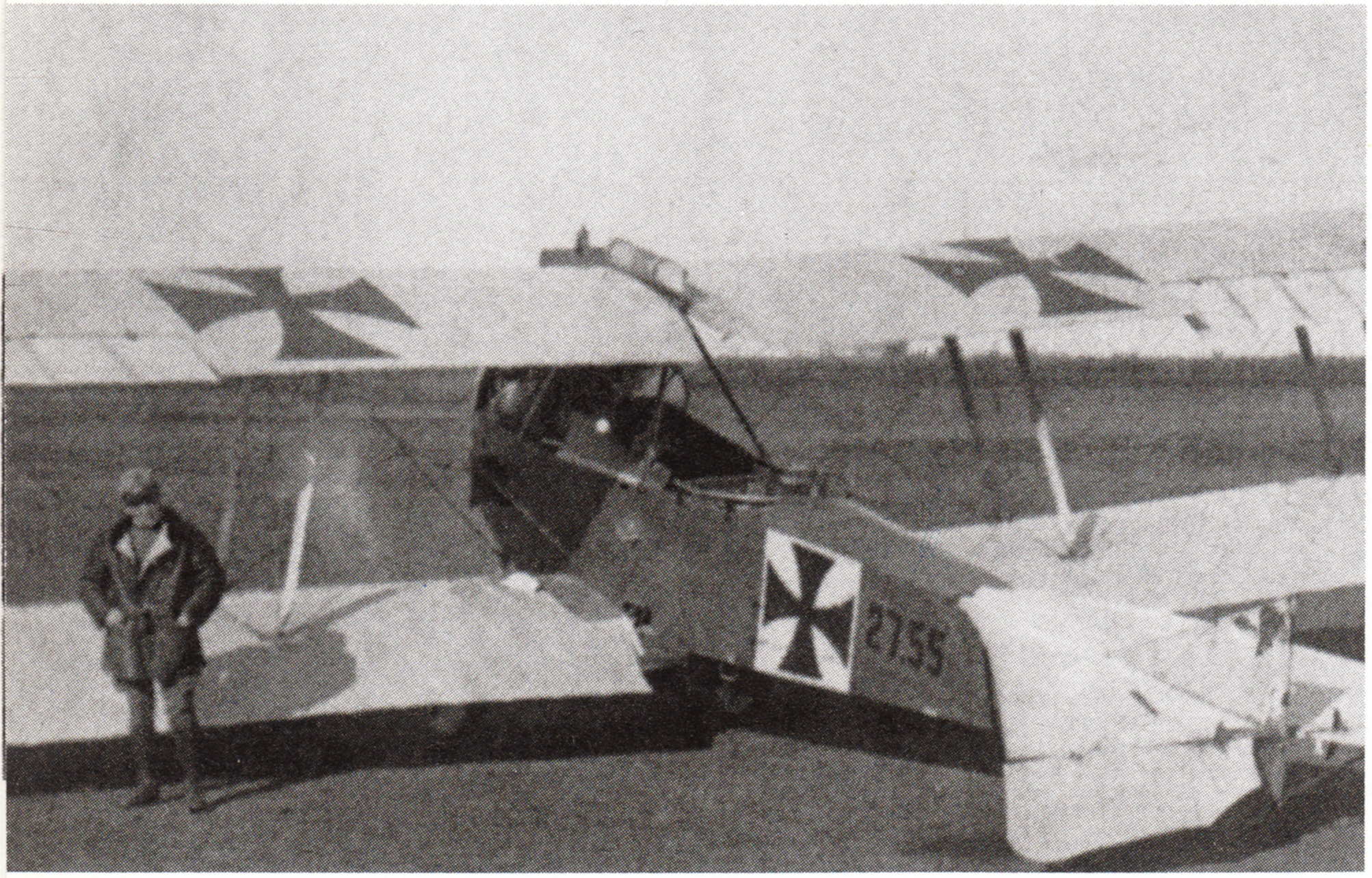
- Chiri in 1917
- Born: 26 August 1894; Locana, Kingdom of Italy
- Died: 6 January 1971 (aged 76); Turin, Italy
- Military career
- Allegiance: Italy
- Branch: Corpo Aeronautico Militare
- Rank: Sergente Maggiore
- Units: 77a Squadriglia, 78a Squadriglia
- Awards: 3 silver awards of Medal for Military Valor, Croce di Guerra

Sergente Maggiore Antonio Chiri (26 August 1894 – 6 January 1971) was an Italian World War I flying ace. He is credited with six confirmed and seven unconfirmed aerial victories.

== Biography ==
Antonio Chiri was born in Locana, the Kingdom of Italy on 26 August 1894.

On 9 September 1914, Chiri was conscripted into the 17th Field Artillery Regiment of the Italian Army. On 18 April 1915, he was accepted for pilot's training at Pisa. He was suspended from training early in the course, but kept on hand as a sheet metal mechanic. In November 1915, he resumed pilot's training. On 1 April 1916, he was promoted to corporal. On 8 June 1916, he finally went on flying service with the 77a Squadriglia. After some months service there, he was transferred to 78a Squadriglia on 11 October 1916. He was promoted again, to Sergente, on 31 October.

On 19 March 1917, Chiri shot down an Austro-Hungarian Hansa-Brandenburg C.1 over Gallio Bassano for his first aerial victory; the feat earned him a Silver Medal for Military Valor. On 26 August 1917, he shot down his second enemy aircraft, over Loque, and was given his second in the field award of the Silver Medal for Military Valor. Chiri submitted victory claims through 27 October 1918. These claims were shared with several other Italian aces, such as Marziale Cerutti, Gastone Novelli, Mario Fucini, Cosimo Rennella, and Cesare Magistrini. War's end brought a third award in the field of the Silver Medal for Military Valor. Chiri had also won the Croce di Guerra at some point. He had received his final promotion to Sergente Maggiore on 15 September 1918. He had flown over 250 combat sorties.

Shortly after war's end, on 21 December 1918, Chiri suffered a flying accident that resulted in his being invalided from military service. On 1 February 1919, an evaluation committee from Italy's military intelligence branch released its evaluation of Italy's World War I aerial victories. The report listed six aerial victories by Chiri, but somehow he has subsequently been listed with five.

Chiri managed to rejoin the military to serve in the Regia Aeronautica reserves. At some point he was raised to the officers' ranks, as he reached the rank of Capitano on 8 June 1942.

Antonio Chiri died in Turin, Italy on 6 January 1971.

== Sources ==
- Franks, Norman; Guest, Russell; Alegi, Gregory. Above the War Fronts: The British Two-seater Bomber Pilot and Observer Aces, the British Two-seater Fighter Observer Aces, and the Belgian, Italian, Austro-Hungarian and Russian Fighter Aces, 1914–1918: Volume 4 of Fighting Airmen of WWI Series: Volume 4 of Air Aces of WWI. Grub Street, 1997. ISBN 1-898697-56-6, ISBN 978-1-898697-56-5.
