= Leopoldo Eleuteri =

- Born: 17 December 1894; Castel Ritaldi, Kingdom of Italy
- Died: 19 January 1926 (aged 31)
- Military career
- Allegiance: Kingdom of Italy
- Branch: Corpo Aeronautico Militare
- Rank: Tenente
- Units: No. 73 Squadriglia, No. 121 Squadriglia, No. 70 Squadriglia
- Awards: 3 Silver awards of Medal for Military Valor, War Merit Cross

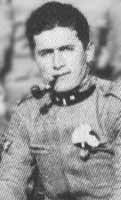
Leopoldo Eleuteri, circa 1920

Tenente Leopoldo Eleuteri was a World War I flying ace credited with seven aerial victories.

== Biography ==
Leopoldo Eleuteri was born in Castel Ritaldi, Kingdom of Italy, on 27 December 1894. He was a student in a technical school until conscripted in 1915. At first, he was assigned to duty in ordnance factories. However, he was forwarded to the 3rd Infantry Regiment. From there, he went to aviation training. On 18 October 1916, he qualified as a pilot at Gabardini's flying school at Cameri. He was certified on the Caudron G.3 on 4 December.

On 28 April 1917, Eleuteri mastered the SAML before being posted out. He served with two SAML squadrons, 73a Squadriglia and 121a Squadriglia. In January 1918, he underwent gunnery training at Furbara. On 22 February 1918, he was transferred to 70a Squadriglia. After flying a few sorties, he made an abortive attack on an observation balloon. On 17 April, he teamed with Aldo Bocchese, Alessandro Resch, and Flaminio Avet in staking claims for an enemy two-seater and two fighters; Eleuteri was credited with two victories.

Eleuteri would go on to fly 151 combat sorties and would engage the Austro-Hungarian enemy 26 times. He had seven of his eight combat claims confirmed, usually in conjunction with Bocchese and Avet, with his final victory forced to land on an Italian aerodrome on 28 October 1918. Leopoldo Eleuteri was thrice awarded the Silver Medal for Military Valor, as well as the War Merit Cross. Following his discharge after the war, he returned to his engineering studies, enrolling in Milan Polytechnic. He graduated in 1922. In 1923, he entered the first engineering officers' competition for the Regia Aeronautica and was appointed as Capitano in the construction section of the new air force on 23 October. He returned to Furbara as commander of the armament flight in the research and development portion of the Regia Aeronautica. On 19 January 1926, Leopoldo Eleuteri perished in a midair collision. The Castiglione del Lago fighter school was named after him.
