= 78a Squadriglia =

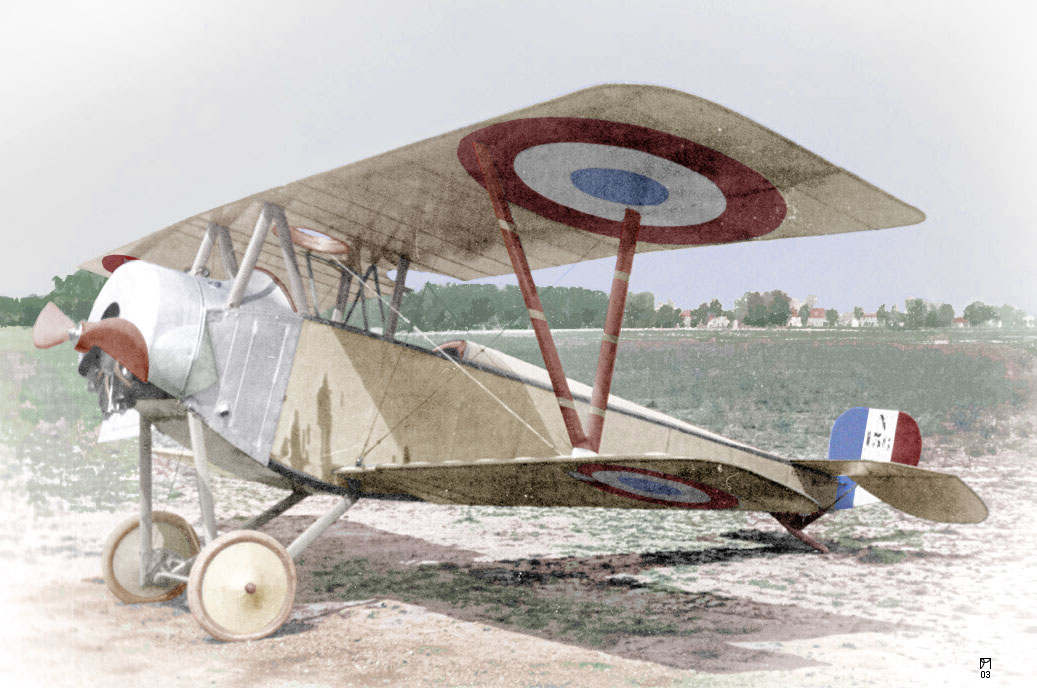
- Nieuport 10
- Active: Founded 29 June 1916
- Country: Kingdom of Italy
- Branch: Corpo Aeronautico Militare
- Type: Fighter squadron
- Engagements: World War I

Aircraft flown
- Fighter: Nieuport 10; Nieuport 11; Hanriot

78a Squadriglia was one of the original Italian fighter squadrons of World War I, serving in combat from 29 June 1916 to 3 November 1918. They flew 4,770 combat missions and were credited with 88 aerial victories.

== History ==
78a Squadriglia of the Corpo Aeronautico Militare was established on 29 June 1916. Equipped with seven Nieuport 10s and a Nieuport 11, it went operational on 16 August 1916. It deployed to Campoformido on 3 September 1916. It flew its first combat sorties six days later. The new squadron was an independent one until 10 April 1917, when it was attached to 10o Gruppo. It left the Gruppo in October 1917 to be subordinated to Pier Ruggero Piccio; this was at the time that Piccio was developing new aerial tactics for the Italians. The squadron would subsequently be posted to the 15o Gruppo on 24 January 1918. Its last wartime posting would be with 23o Gruppo, on 18 July 1918.

When the war ended, 78a Squadriglia had flown 4,770 combat sorties, fought 443 aerial combats, and been credited with 88 aerial victories. Six of its members had shot down five or more enemy aircraft with the squadron. Four of the squadron's pilots had paid the final price.

== Commanding officers ==
- Domenico Bolognesi: From ca. 29 June 1916
- Antonio Riva: 20 November 1917 through war's end

== Duty stations ==
- Campoformido: 3 September 1916
- Borgnano: August 1917
- Aviano: October 1917
- Istrana

== Notable members ==
- Amedeo Mecozzi
- Antonio Riva
- Cosimo Rennella
- Antonio Chiri
- Guglielmo Fornagiari
- Guido Masiero

== Aircraft ==
- Nieuport 10
- Nieuport 11
- Hanriots
