= 71a Squadriglia =

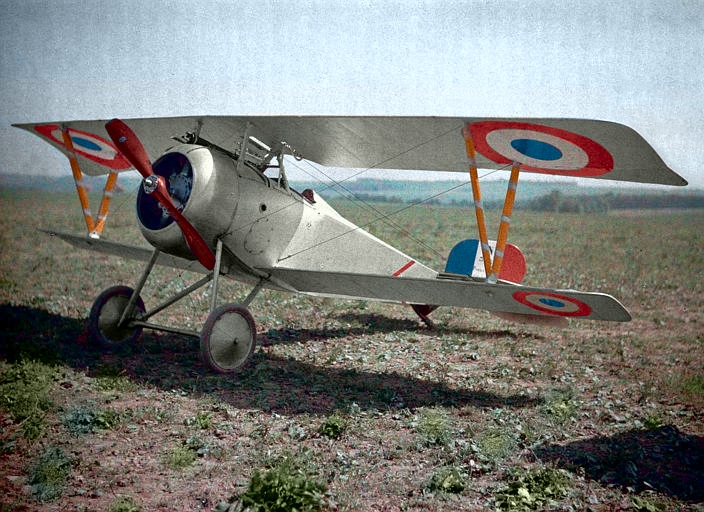
- Nieuport 17
- Active: Founded 30 January 1916
- Country: Kingdom of Italy
- Allegiance: Italy
- Branch: Corpo Aeronautico Militare
- Type: Fighter squadron
- Engagements: World War I Battle of Caporetto

Aircraft flown
- Fighter: Nieuport 10; Nieuport 11; Spad VII; Nieuport 17; Hanriot HD.1

71a Squadriglia of the Corpo Aeronautico Militare was one of the original fighter squadrons of the Italian military. Founded on 30 January 1916 to fight in World War I, the squadron served until war's end. It flew almost 3,000 combat sorties in defense of Italy at a cost of six pilots killed, scored 17 victories, and produced two aces from its ranks.

== History ==
71a Squadriglia was founded in Turin on 30 January 1916 as 2a Squadriglia Caccia. The new unit initially lacked armament, but once machine guns were supplied for their craft, flew their first operational sorties on 18 February 1916. On 2 March 1916, the squadron began to redeploy to Cascina Farello; foul weather stretched the redeployment to almost a month's travail. On 2 April 1916, a squadron Nieuport 10 two-seater flew the new unit's first interception, with inconclusive results.

On 15 April 1916, the squadron was redesignated as the 71a Squadriglia. It was transferred to Villaverla on 23 May. It was subordinated to 3o Gruppo on 8 July 1916. In September and October, the squadron supported the Italian Army's 45th Division, protecting the Asiago Plateau from attack. In December 1916, the unit began to upgrade with Nieuport 17s.

The squadron changed commanders on 17 January 1917, with Chiaperotti moving up to command the group, and being replaced by Amerigo Notari. On 10 May 1917, the squadron was transferred to the newly formed 9o Gruppo. Late May saw the arrival of the unit's first Spad VII fighter; this first example was equipped for long range photo reconnaissance. As time passed, the squadron was drawn into the burgeoning Battle of Caporetto (see below). As a result, on 26 October the squadron was temporarily seconded to 3o Gruppo. It also lent four pilots to 82a Squadriglia, and received a section of SAML two-seater reconnaissance craft brought on strength. As the front moved south from Caporetto toward the Piave River, 71a Squadriglia came within enemy artillery range. As a result, on 23 November 1917, the unit relocated to Sovisso. On 16 December, it was reassigned, to the newly formed 16o Gruppo.

Early 1918 saw several changes of commander for the squadron, including Ettore Croce's three days in charge that was terminated by his fatal accident. On 28 July, Salvatore Breglia settled into the post, and served through war's end. A Hanriot HD.1 section detached from 75a Squadriglia joined the 71a Squadriglia on 28 August 1918. On 20 October 1918, 71a Squadriglia was bisected, with one of its sections staying put while the six Spad VIIs of the other section moved to Quinto di Treviso to join a section from 75a Squadriglia in an ad hoc squadron. On 23 October, 71a Squadriglia became part of 17o Gruppo. On 31 October 1918, Capitano Breglia was wounded, but remained in command.

The squadron remained active through war's end. During its wartime existence, it had flown 2,994 combat sorties. It had fought 203 combats in the sky, claimed 17 aerial victories, and lost two of its own aircraft in combat. The blood cost for the squadron was two killed in action, four killed in accidents.

== Commanding officers ==
- Capitano Giorgio Chiaperotti: 30 January 1916 – 17 January 1917
- Capitano Amerigo Notari: 17 January 1917 – 5 January 1918
- Capitano Palli: 5 January 1918-March 1918
- Tenente Aldo Anesini: March 1918-28 May 1918
- Capitano Ettore Croce: 28–31 May 1918 (killed in flying accident)
- Tenente Aldo Anesini: 1 June 1918 – 16 July 1918
- Capitano Salvatore Breglia: 16 July 1918 – 6 November 1918.

== Duty stations ==
- La Comina: From February 1916
- Cascina Farello: From 2 March 1916
- Villaverla: From 23 May 1916
- Sovizzo: From 23 November 1917
- Castelgomberto: From mid-May 1918.

== Notable members ==
- Antonio Amantea
- Sebastiano Bedendo.

== Aircraft ==
- Founded with Nieuport 10s and Nieuport 11s
- Nieuport 17s: From December 1916
- Spad VII: From May 1917.
- Hanriot HD.1: From 28 August 1918
