= 260a Squadriglia =

- Active: Founded November 1917
- Country: Kingdom of Italy
- Branch: Corpo Aeronautico Militare
- Type: Fighter squadron
- Engagements: World War I

Aircraft flown
- Fighter: Macchi M.5; Macchi M.7

260a Squadriglia was Italy's first naval fighter squadron. It served during the last year of World War I, from November 1917 to November 3, 1918. It operated Macchi seaplane fighters over the northern Adriatic Sea. During Italy's final offensive, it flew overland missions to support Italy's army in its victory over the Austro-Hungarian Empire. The squadron had three pilots become flying aces while serving with it.

== History ==
260 Squadriglia was Italy's first naval fighter squadron, being founded early in November 1917. It was stationed at Sant' Andrea Seaplane Station near Venice in the northern Adriatic Sea.

The unit operated against similar Austro-Hungarian seaplane units based on the eastern shore of the Adriatic. During Italy's final victorious offensive at Vittorio Veneto, the naval squadron delivered overland strikes in support of the Italian Army. On 2 November 1918, a stunting squadron member named Pagliacci realized that the city below, Trieste, was devoid of retreating enemy forces. The pilot landed and was the first Italian serviceman to re-enter the city.

== Commanding officers ==
- Tenente di Vascello (Naval Lieutenant) Luigi Bologna: November 1917
- Tenente di Vascello Federico Martinengo: December 1917
- Tenente di Vascello Bortolozzo

== Notable members ==
- Federico Martinengo
- Orazio Pierozzi
- Umberto Calvello
- Giorgio Parodi and Carlo Guzzi

== Aircraft ==
The squadron field tested the Hanriot HD.1 seaplane version, and the SIA 7. However, the squadron operated the Macchi M.5, and was known to have the Macchi M.7 on strength. Squadron insignia was six black bands painted about the rear of the fuselage.
