= Calvelli =

Calvelli is a surname. Notable people with the surname include:

- Aida Calvelli, Gucci founder Guccio Gucci's wife
- Frank Calvelli, American intelligence official
- Massimo Calvelli (born 1974), Italian sports executive and tennis player
- Tony Calvelli (1915–1979), American football player and track and field athlete

== See also ==
- Calvello (surname)
