= Guido Masiero =

Italian flying ace (1895–1942)

- Born: August 24, 1895; Padua, Italy
- Died: November 24, 1942 (aged 47); Milan, Italy
- Military career
- Allegiance: Italy
- Branch: Italian Army; Italian Air Force
- Service years: 1913 - 1942
- Rank: Capitano
- Units: 26a Squadriglia; 103a Squadriglia; 86a Squadriglia; 91a Squadriglia; 78a Squadriglia; 3a Sez SVA; Aviazione Legionaria
- Conflicts: World War I Second Italo-Abyssinian War; Spanish Civil War
- Awards: 3 silver and 1 bronze awards of Medal for Military Valor (Italy); Croix de guerre (Belgium)

Capitano Guido Masiero (24 August 1895 – 24 November 1942) was a World War I flying ace credited with five confirmed and ten unconfirmed aerial victories. He was a prewar lancer who used his civilian engineering expertise to wrangle a transfer to aviation duty.

== Early life and service ==
Guido Masiero was born into a middle-class family in Padua in the Kingdom of Italy on 24 August 1895. He studied engineering before joining the Italian Army's 5th "Novara" Lancers on 4 December 1913. He used his technical knowledge as grounds for a transfer to the Italian Army's air service.

== World War I aviation service ==
Masiero began aviation schooling on 1 February 1915. On 1 August 1915, he was rated a qualified pilot on the Maurice Farman aircraft. He completed pilot's training and was assigned as a sergente to 7a Squadriglia (later to be redesignated 26a Squadriglia) reaching the front on 15 October 1915. He qualified as a Voisin pilot on 15 November 1915. In December 1915 Masiero began to fly a Voisin for 26a Squadriglia. He flew 58 reconnaissance sorties over the Carso and sometimes returned with battle damage. At some point prior to February 1917, Guido Masiero was commissioned as a sottotenente.

After the squadron was disbanded on 4 March 1917, Masiero was hastily reassigned to 103a Squadriglia at Brindisi. He then transferred to the Nieuport training unit at Malpensa on 14 May 1917. On 29 July 1917, he was promoted to tenente. Next, on 10 September 1917, he was forwarded to the 86a Squadiglia at Ponte San Pietro for further training on the new Ansaldo SVAs. As the SVAs were still under development, Masiero was sent to 91a Squadiglia on 27 October 1917. This was cut short by demands for all pilots to fight in the Battle of Caporetto; Masiero arrived on 2 November 1917 with 78a Squadriglia.

On 7 November 1917, Masiero staked his first victory claim, but it went unconfirmed. He then joined with Mario Fucini, Razzi, and Antonio Chiri for his first official victory on 13 November 1917. Six days later, he scored a solo win, but his second claim on the 19 November went unconfirmed, as did one submitted for the following day. It was not until 10 December 1917 that he scored again, to balance out his count of confirmed and unconfirmed wins at three each. Four days later, another claim went unconfirmed. Finally, on 26 December 1917, in two separate fights, Masiero became an ace, sharing both victories with a number of other Allied pilots.

Masiero was promoted to tenente from sottotentente on 17 January 1918. He would go on to make six more victory claims during the first six months of 1918, to no avail. On 29 March 1918, he left 78a Squadriglia for posting to 3a Sezione SVA to fly the new Ansaldo SVAs. A review committee meeting immediately postwar disallowed at least six previously confirmed victories, leaving Masiero's tally at five confirmed.

== Post-World War I ==
In December 1918, the month after World War I ended, Masiero was assigned to the Experimental Directorate of the Italian Army's air service. He would spend a year there before his military discharge. Masiero had built a reputation for both piloting and technical expertise that saw him part of his country's postwar aviation mission to France, as well as participating in the ELTA Aeronautical Exhibition in Amsterdam. He was the pilot of one of 11 Italian planes that took off on 14 February 1920 for the Rome-Tokyo Raid. During the trip, he had to take a train in British India from Delhi to Calcutta to pick up a spare Ansaldo SVA after his original SVA became unserviceable, but he was one of only two pilots to complete the journey, arriving on 31 May 1920 and landing just after fellow SVA pilot Arturo Ferrarin.

On 16 July 1935, now-Capitano Masiero was recalled from the Italian Air Force reserve to serve in the Second Italo-Abyssinian War in the 20th Stormo. He flew both ground-attack and bombing missions in Romeo Ro.1s, IMAM Ro.37s, and Caproni Ca 101s. He served in Ethiopia until 18 November 1936, then returned to Italy. He received a Silver Medal for Military Valor for his service in the Ethiopian campaign. After returning to Italy, he served in two ground-attack units, the 5th and 50th Stormos.

In 1937, Masiero volunteered to serve in Italy's Aviazione Legionaria ("Aviation Legion") in the Spanish Civil War under the nom de guerre "Guido Magoni". He arrived in Spain in October 1937. This time, he flew combat in a Breda Ba.65 until April 1938. Following this stint of service, which ended on 31 May 1938, Masiero joined Breda as chief test pilot; he also designed two planes that were never built.

After Italy entered World War II in June 1940, Masiero volunteered to fly a Junkers Ju 87 dive bomber in combat, but was refused. It was felt that his services as test pilot for Breda were more important to Italy's war effort. Masiero was killed while flying in heavy fog in a Macchi C.202 fighter on 24 November 1942 when he collided with Francesco Agello over Milan. Agello also was killed.

== Honors and awards ==
- Citation on 4 October 1916
- War Merit Cross
- Bronze Medal for Military Valor: February 1917
- Silver awards of Medal for Military Valor: first awarded 20 November 1917 (in the field); 2 more awards circa 1919; one more award for 1937–1938
- Croix de guerre (Belgium)
