= Orazio Pierozzi =

Italian flying ace (1884-1919)

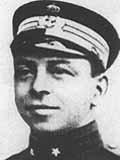
- Born: 8 December 1884; San Casciano Val di Pesa, Kingdom of Italy
- Died: 18 March 1919 (aged 34); Trieste
- Military career
- Allegiance: Kingdom of Italy
- Branch: Italian naval aviation
- Service years: 1908–1919
- Rank: Tenente di Vascello
- Units: Gruppo Idrocaccia Venezia, 255a Squadriglia, Staz Brindisi
- Commands: Gruppo Idrocaccia Venezia
- Awards: 4 Silver and 1 Bronze Medal for Military Valor

Tenente di Vascello Orazio Pierozzi (1884–1919) was a World War I flying ace credited with seven aerial victories.

== Biography ==
Orazio Pierozzi was born in San Casciano Val di Pesa in the Kingdom of Italy on 8 December 1884. He began his military career on 8 November 1908, when he entered the Italian Naval Academy at Livorno. By the time he reported for aviation training on 15 June 1916, he was a seasoned sailor. On 14 October, he was rated as a pilot; three days later, he was assigned to Brindisi Naval Air Station, which he would rise to command.

On 15 May 1917, he staked his first aerial victory claim; however, it was denied, and aviation historians have since been unable to find a corresponding Austro-Hungarian loss. However, on 7 June, he shot down a Lohner K flying boat, killing both the crew; this was his first real aerial victory. In December 1917, Pierozzi was appointed to command a naval squadron, 255a Squadriglia. Pierozzi had managed the remarkable feat of receiving three silver and one bronze Medals for Military Valor during the year.

On 18 March 1918, Pierozzi was appointed to command of the newly formed Italian naval fighter group of two squadrons of Macchi M.5 flying boat fighters. He thoroughly trained and directed the new unit, and flew with one of its units, 260a Squadriglia. On 1 May 1918, he shot down a Hansa-Brandenburg W.18 over Grado, Friuli-Venezia Giulia for his second victory. Then, on 14 May, he forced one Austro-Hungarian W.18 to land, set another on fire and forced it to land, and shared in a third victory with Martinengo. On 22 May, he downed a land-based enemy Phonix D.I fighter in the Aegean Sea west of Rovigno. He would not score his last accredited victory on 2 July 1918. He would fight on until the Austro-Hungarian surrender on 3 November 1918; that day he would transfer to the newly reconquered city of Trieste. Pierozzi's war had ended after 700 combat sorties, including over 500 fighter missions. He had submitted 16 claims for aerial victories, only seven of which were approved.

On 17 March 1919, Pierozzi began a return flight to Trieste from Venice in a Macchi M.9 seaplane with a fellow naval lieutenant aboard. His passenger was another fighter pilot, His Royal Highness Aimone di Savoia. A half mile from Trieste, as they let down into the harbor in deteriorating flying weather, a gust of wind flung the M.9 into the harbor breakwater. A nearby steamship, the Tergeste, immediately rescued both fliers. However, Orazio Pierozzi died the next day. He was awarded a fourth silver Medal for Military Valor posthumously for his efforts in protecting his passenger during the accident.
