= Sebastiano Bedendo =

- Born: July 18, 1895; Rovigo, Kingdom of Italy
- Died: August 24, 1935 (aged 40); Spinosa di Ottiglio, Kingdom of Italy
- Military career
- Allegiance: Kingdom of Italy
- Branch: Flying service
- Rank: Maggiore
- Units: 42a Squadriglia, 48a Squadriglia, 72a Squadriglia, 71a Squadriglia,
- Awards: Medal for Military Valor (1 bronze and 1 silver award)
- Other work: Aeronautical record holder post World War I

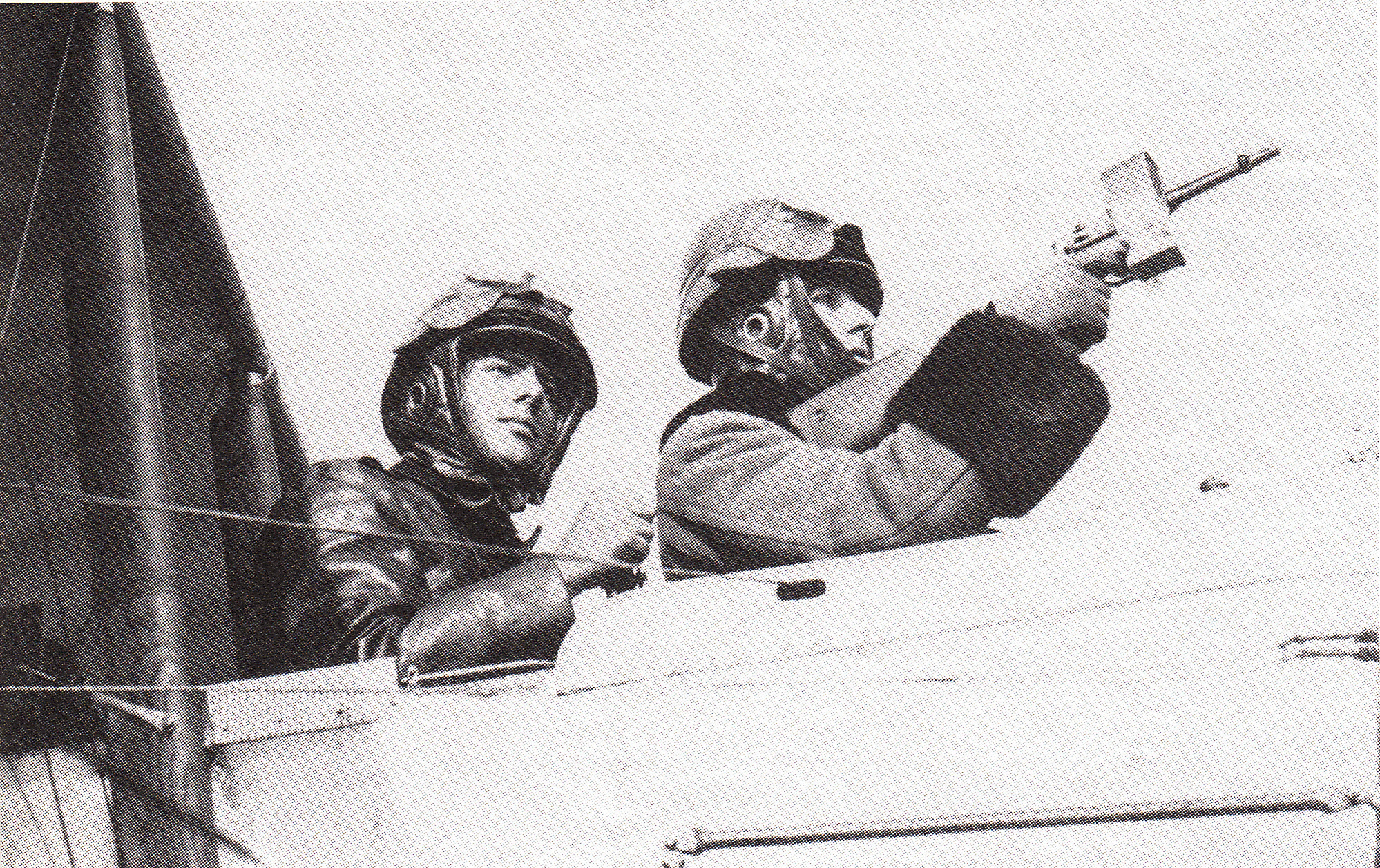
Sebastiano Bedendo portrait

Maggiore Sebastiano Bedendo (18 July 1895 – 24 August 1935) was a World War I flying ace credited with five aerial victories. After completing his education postwar, he rejoined Italian military aviation. He set several world aviation flying records with a Nuvoli N.5 monoplane before dying in an air crash.

== World War I ==
Sebastiano Bedendo was born on 18 July 1895 in Rovigo, in the Kingdom of Italy. He began his military service with the 5th Fortress Artillery Regiment. Bedendo was conscripted when Italy entered World War I. His time with the cannons was brief, as he quickly transferred to aerial observer duty in a kite balloon section. He was accepted for flying training on 17 April 1916; he took his first flight three days later, in a Caudron G.3. On 19 June in Busto Arsizio, he qualified as a pilot. He continued training, qualifying on the Caudron G.3 on 1 July, Farman on 1 September, and Caudron G.4 on 3 October 1916. His first assignment was flying reconnaissance on the battle fronts of northern Italy. On 7 October, he was assigned to 48a Squadriglia as a G.4 pilot.

On 17 February 1917, Bedendo transferred to the 71a Squadriglia. He was selected for fighter training on Nieuports, which he began on 18 October in Malpensa. When training was completed, he was posted back to 72a Squadriglia on 27 November 1917.

Bedendo was detached to serve in the Hanriot flight of 71a Squadriglia on 18 January 1918. He served a month with them before returning to 72a Squadriglia for a month. On 11 March 1918, he would settle into service with 71a Squadriglia. He would stake his first aerial victory claim while with them, on 19 March 1918. It went unconfirmed, as did his second claim on 7 June. It would not be until 29 July that he was credited with his first confirmed aerial victory. This began a string of aerial victory claims that, by competing accounts, made him an ace with five confirmed wins and four unconfirmed ones. By all accounts, he began scoring on 29 July 1918, followed by a certain second win the next day. From there the accounts differ, but in any case, after scoring his fifth win, he transferred out. On 20 October 1918, he joined the "Squadron of Aces", 91a Squadriglia, by invitation. There he participated in the war's final offensive, though with no more aerial victories.

== Postwar life ==
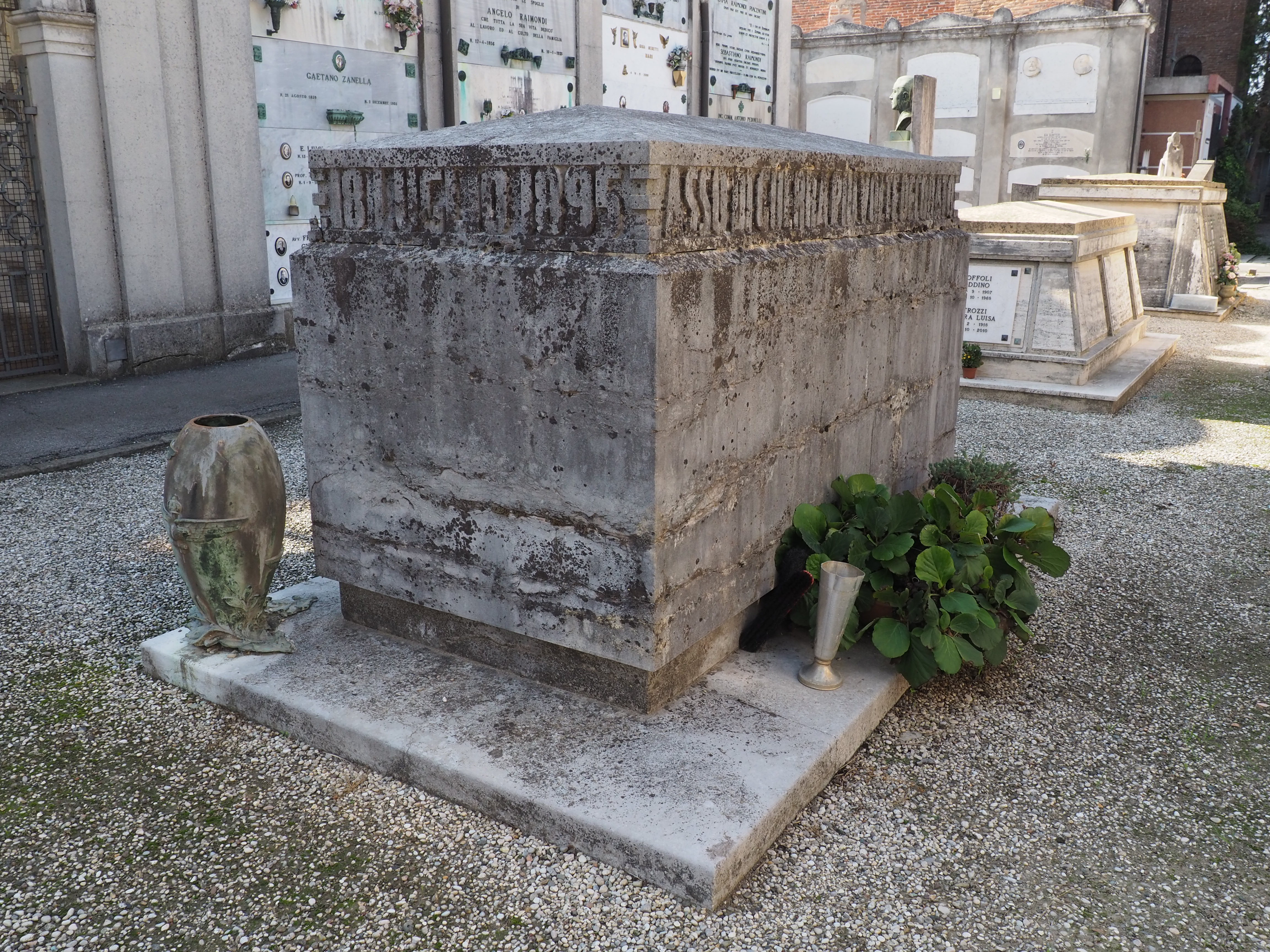
Rovigo, municipal cemetery: the sarcophagus of Bedendo's mortal remains.

Bedendo returned to his engineering studies at university. After graduation, he joined the newly formed Regia Aeronautica in 1924, in their engineering branch as a Capitano. In December 1930, he was promoted to Maggiore.

On 6 March 1933, he made the maiden flight with a Nuvoli N5 light aircraft. Between April and June, Bedendo set a world aeronautical record for light aircraft, and two speed records over 100 km and 500 km courses. A French Farman 239 took one of the records, and Bedendo seized it back in 1935, using a modernized Nuvoli N.5 RR.

On 24 August 1935, Nuvoli N.5 Cab. I-NUBE lost a wing in flight. The crew of Sebastiano Bedendo, Giovanni Testore, and Giovanni Nicastro did not survive the crash at Spinosa di Ottiglio.

== Honors and awards ==
- Mentioned in despatches thrice: May, June, August 1918
- Bronze Medal for Military Valor
- Silver Medal for Military Valor
