= List of World War I aces from Georgia =

The list of World War I flying aces born in Georgia is incomplete but contains one name:

- Alexander P. de Seversky, credited with six confirmed aerial victories while serving with the Imperial Russian Air Service.
