= Guglielmo Fornagiari =

Italian flying ace (1892–1956)

- Born: 1892; Lizzano in Belvedere, Kingdom of Italy
- Died: 3 February 1956 (aged 63–64); Bologna, Kingdom of Italy
- Military career
- Allegiance: Kingdom of Italy
- Branch: Corpo Aeronautico Militare
- Service years: ca 1916-1925
- Rank: Sergente Maggiore
- Unit: 78a Squadriglia
- Awards: 1 Gold and 2 Silver awards of Medal for Military Valor

Sergente Maggiore Guglielmo Fornagiari was an Italian World War I flying ace credited with six aerial victories.

== Biography ==
Guglielmo Fornagiari was born in Lizzano in Belvedere, Kingdom of Italy, in 1892.

His life and military career are unknown before he was posted to a fighter squadron, 78a Squadriglia, on 3 September 1916. On 19 June 1917, he staked his first victory claim while flying a Nieuport 11. Eight days later, his takeoff was aborted by engine failure, and he crashlanded in a vineyard. He was unhurt, but two vineyard workers were killed and another pair injured. Despite this, he continued to fly and fight, and scored his first accredited aerial victory on 22 August 1917. He had been equipped with a Hanriot HD.1 by 8 October, when he staked his fourth claim. Fornagiari continued to score; on 26 December, he would share two victories, one with Masiero, for his fifth and sixth claims. He ended 1917 by receiving a second Silver Medal.

Fornagiari would post three more victory claims in 1918. He ended the war still with 78a Squadriglia. At some point during the war, in addition to the Silver Medals for Military Valor, he won a Bronze award of the Medal, plus a Serbian Order of the Star of Karađorđe.

The postwar aerial victory review would approve six of his nine victory claims. He was appointed as battalion adjutant for the squadron, remaining with them until May 1925.

Guglielmo Fornagiari died in Bologna on 3 February 1956.
