= List of World War I flying aces from Estonia =

List of WW1 Estonian aces

The list of World War I flying aces from Estonia contains one name:

- Jaan Mahlapuu reputedly scored six aerial victories while flying for the Imperial Russian Air Service.
