= List of World War I aces from Switzerland =

While Switzerland remained neutral during World War I, three of its citizens served in other nations' air forces and became flying aces.

- Alfred Michael Koch – 10 confirmed aerial victories while serving in the Royal Flying Corps and Royal Air Force.
- Marcel Bloch – 5 confirmed aerial victories while serving in the French Aéronautique Militaire.
- Jacques Roques – 5 confirmed aerial victories when serving in the French Aéronautique Militaire.
