= Castelgomberto =

- Comune
- Comune di Castelgomberto
- Coat of arms

- Location within Italy Location within Veneto
- Coordinates: 45°35′N 11°24′E
- Country: Italy
- Region: Veneto
- Province: Vicenza (VI)
- Frazioni: Valle

Government
  - Mayor: Davide Dorentani

Area
  - Total: 17.3 km^{2} (6.7 sq mi)
- Elevation: 145 m (476 ft)

Population (2015)
  - Total: 6,109
  - Density: 353/km^{2} (915/sq mi)
- Demonym: Castrobertensi
- Time zone: UTC+1 (CET)
  - Summer (DST): UTC+2 (CEST)
- Postal code: 36070
- Dialing code: 0445
- Patron saint: St. Peter
- Website: Official website

Castelgomberto is a town and comune in the province of Vicenza, Veneto, in northern Italy. It is located east of SP246 provincial road.

== Notable people ==
- Michele Carlotto (born 3 February 1919) - bishop
- Francesco Randon (born 23 November 1925) - retired footballer
