= List of World War I aces from New Zealand =

Below is the list of World War I flying aces from New Zealand. While New Zealand did not have its own military air service during World War I, many New Zealanders did join Australian or British military aviation to fight in the war. Some of New Zealand's first class of aces continued to serve post-war, whether in the Royal Air Force or the Royal New Zealand Air Force; some served in World War II. Several earned advanced rank in the process.

Name	Air service(s)	Victories	Notes
Keith Caldwell	Royal Flying Corps, Royal Air Force, Royal New Zealand Air Force	25	Rose to Air Commodore in RNZAF.
Keith Park	Royal Flying Corps, Royal Air Force	20	Rose to Chief Air Marshal; was a crucial commander in the Battle of Britain.
Ronald Bannerman	Royal Flying Corps, Royal Air Force	17	Rose to Air Commodore.
Arthur Coningham	Royal Flying Corps, Royal Air Force	14	Rose to Air Marshal in RAF; pioneered close air support.
Herbert Gilles Watson	Australian Flying Corps	14	Highest scoring New Zealander in the AFC.
Clive Franklyn Collett	Royal Flying Corps, Royal Air Force	12	First military pilot in British service to parachute from an aircraft in January 1917.
Harold Beamish	Royal Naval Air Service, Royal Air Force	11	Highest scoring New Zealander in the RNAS.
Malcolm C. McGregor	Royal Flying Corps, Royal Air Force	11	
Frederick Gordon	Royal Flying Corps, Royal Air Force	9	
Herbert Drewitt	Royal Flying Corps, Royal Air Force	7	Earned a DFC for trench strafing exploits.
Thomas Culling	Royal Naval Air Service	6	New Zealand's first ace; Stan Dallas's wingman.
Forster Maynard	Royal Naval Air Service, Royal Air Force	6	Rose to Air Vice Marshal in RAF; commanded air defense of Malta during WWII.
Carrick Paul	Australian Flying Corps	5	
Alan Scott	Royal Flying Corps, Royal Air Force	5	Rose to Group Captain before early death.
