= Federico Martinengo =

Italian flying ace (1899–1943)

Federico Carlo Martinengo
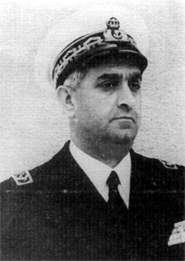
- Born: 19 July 1899; Rome, Latium, Italy
- Died: 9 September 1943 (aged 44); Ligurian Sea
- Military career
- Allegiance: Kingdom of Italy
- Branch: Regia Marina
- Service years: 1911–1943
- Rank: Contrammiraglio (Rear Admiral)
- Commands: 253a Squadriglia; 260a Squadriglia; Leros naval base; Muzio Attendolo (cruiser); Italian Navy ASW forces
- Conflicts: World War I; Adriatic Campaign of World War I; World War II; Battle of the Mediterranean; Battle of Calabria; Operation Hats; Operation Achse
- Awards: War Cross for Military Valor; Silver Medal of Military Valor (two times); Gold Medal of Military Valor (posthumous)

Federico Carlo Martinengo (18 July 1899 – 9 September 1943) was an Italian flying ace, credited with five aerial victories, during World War I, and an Italian admiral during World War II.

== Early life and service ==
Federico Carlo Martinengo was born in Rome on 18 July 1899. The son of a naval officer, he studied the classics in school before moving on to the Regia Accademia Navale in Leghorn in September 1911. After graduating as a midshipman on 25 May 1915, the day after Italy entered World War I was serving on the Italian battleship Dante Alighieri when Italy entered the war in 1915.

== World War I and aviation career ==
During World War I, Martinengo first served on board the battleship Conte di Cavour and later on the transport Trinacria. Having volunteered for aviation soon after the war began, he trained at Taranto, then reported to the main Italian naval base at Venice, in September 1916.

On 10 October 1916, he was flying as an observer with Pietro Valdimiro when they clashed with an Austro-Hungarian seaplane. From a position below and ahead of the seaplane, Martinengo managed to knock out its engine with gunfire. This first victory (which granted him a Silver Medal of Military Valor) was soon followed by a second on the 23rd. Then, on 11 November, Martinengo was transferred to Grado. His friendly good cheer was to be put to the test in the command of 1a Squadriglia (soon to be re-dubbed 253a Squadriglia).

Summer 1917 was spent by Martinengo familiarizing himself with a new plane, the Macchi M.5 seaplane. When enough of the new planes accumulated, they were formed into the new 260a Squadriglia with Martinengo included. The new squadron was thrown immediately into battle covering the retreat from the Battle of Caporetto. On 5 November 1917, they were disgraced during an escort mission, when the Austro-Hungarian aces Godwin Brumowski, Frank Linke-Crawford, and Rudolf Szepessy-Sokoll shot down the Macchi L.3 being escorted. In December, Martinengo was promoted to command of the squadron.

About February 1918, he was promoted to lieutenant. On 4 May 1918, he led an interception off Trieste of four Austro-Hungarian seaplanes led by Gottfried Freiherr von Banfield. Three of the Austro-Hungarian planes fell before the guns of Martinengo, Calvello, Pierozzi and their squadronmates. Banfield also went down, but escaped by gliding to friendly waters, where he was rescued. In June, Martinengo was transferred off combat duty after 172 sorties; he moved to Bolsena Flying School. There he taught American as well as Italian naval aviators. In September, he was posted to Otranto. The war ended during this assignment.

== Interwar years ==
Martinengo remained in the surface navy after the war. In 1919 he became executive officer on a torpedo boat; he was promoted to lieutenant commander in 1927 and to commander in 1932. Between 1931 and 1933, he commanded the Italian naval detachment at Tianjin, China. Back to Italy, he attended the Naval Warfare Institute and became Captain, after which he was appointed commander of the Leros naval base and later of the light cruiser Muzio Attendolo.

== World War II ==
Soon after Italy's entry into World War II, on 9 July 1940, Martinengo participated in the Battle of Calabria, in command of Attendolo. After some more missions with the cruiser, including escorting a convoy to Libya and taking part in the contrast of Operation Hats, in October 1940 Martinengo became chief of staff of the Taranto Naval Department, a charge that he held until promoted to rear admiral. On 10 April 1943, he was appointed commander-in-chief of the anti-submarine forces of the Italian Navy, with seat in La Spezia.

The announcement of the armistice between Italy and the Allies found Martinengo in Rome; acting upon instructions he had received, in the morning of 9 September 1943 he reached La Spezia, ordered every operational submarine chaser to move south to reach an Allied-controlled port, and then left himself La Spezia on board the submarine chaser VAS 234, in company with her sister ship VAS 235. Around 12:30 on the same day, the two submarine chasers met two German R boats off Gorgona Island; the latter commanded them to stop, but Martinengo ordered to increase speed instead, upon which the German units opened fire with their machine guns, and the Italian submarine chasers returned fire. They fought with their machine guns till 13:20, then Martinengo ordered to go nearer to the coast in nearby Cala Scirocco, so that they would obtain support from the Italian coastal batteries on the island (as the German R-Boats were more heavily armed than his two VAS). Having personally taken the helm of VAS 234, Martinengo was hit ten minutes later by a burst of machine gun from one of the R-Boats, and he was killed instantly. VAS 234 was also set afire, but she managed to reach the shore and allow her crew to disembark, before exploding and sinking. Martinengo's body (he had been the only casualty in the fight) was recovered on 14 September and buried at Gorgona; he was posthumously awarded the Gold Medal of Military Valor.

== Legacy ==
The Marina Militare Italiana has named one FREMM multipurpose frigate after him.
