= List of World War I aces from Latvia =

The list of World War I flying aces from Latvia contains only one name with five confirmed victories, as well as the names of two others whose claims were unconfirmed.

- Eduard Pulpe was credited with five confirmed aerial victories while flying with the French Aéronautique Militaire and the Imperial Russian Air Service before he was fatally wounded in action on 2 August 1916.

Additionally, two other Latvian pilots are reputed to have become aces.

- Lieutenant Peteris Eduard M. Tomsons, is tentatively credited with 11 victories. He served in the French, Russian, and Soviet Air Forces before joining the Latvian Aviation Group during the Latvian War of Independence. Itemized list of one confirmed and four unconfirmed victories exists.
- Olgerdis I. Teteris (alias O. J. Teter or Olgerts Teteris), tentatively credited with six victories while serving in the Imperial Russian Air Service, before he was killed in action on 28 February 1917. Itemized list of two confirmed victories exists.
