= List of World War I flying aces from Swaziland =

Two World War I flying aces were born in Swaziland. They were:

- Leonard A. Payne
- Percy Frank Charles Howe
