= Amedeo Mecozzi =

Italian flying ace (1892–1971)

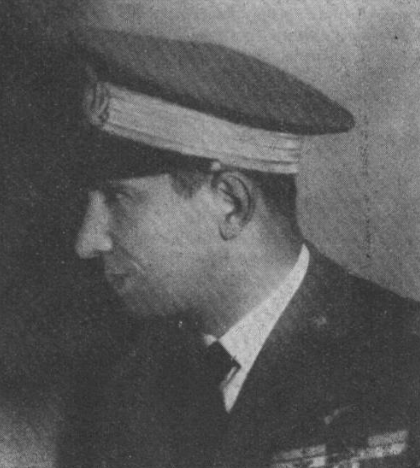
- Italian fighter ace of World War I
- Born: 17 January 1892; Rome, Italy
- Died: November 2, 1971 (aged 79); Rome, Italy
- Military career
- Allegiance: Italy
- Branch: Flying service
- Service years: 1914 – c. 1946
- Rank: tenente (WWI), generale (WWII)
- Units: 45a, 46a, 48a, 49a, 50a, 76a and 78a Squadriglia
- Awards: 1 silver and 2 bronze awards of Medal for Military Valor, Croce di Guerra

Amedeo Mecozzi (17 January 1892 – 2 November 1971) was an Italian fighter ace of World War I, a general of the Italian Regia Aeronautica and a military theorist credited as the founding father of the "Attack air force" doctrine, which made him a strong opponent to general Giulio Douhet's theories.

== Early life and World War I ==
Amedeo Mecozzi was born on 17 January 1892 in Rome. Mecozzi was orphaned when young, and raised by his grandparents. He joined the Italian Army as an engineer and spent a year as a volunteer in Somalia before applying for pilot's training in 1915. In June 1915, he began training at Malpensa on 2 September. January 1916 saw him qualifying on Maurice Farman 12 and Maurice Farman 14 machines. On 1 February 1916 he received his pilot's certificate. In March 1916 he began flying reconnaissance missions for 45a Squadriglia, at some hazard; he often brought home an airplane damaged by enemy fire.

On 1 January 1917, he was commissioned as a Second lieutenant (sottotenente and reassigned to 50a Squadriglia. His determination to continue fighting despite battle damaged aircraft won him renown; on 8 January and 19 February, he was granted a Bronze Medal for Military Valor. On 19 June 1917, he was shot down by bullets through his Farman's radiator. That same day, he was awarded the Croce di Guerra. In September 1917, he was forwarded to fighter pilot's training in Malpensa. On 4 October, he was promoted to lieutenant (tenente. He was then posted to the 76a Squadriglia on 12 October. The next month, he was assigned to 78a Squadriglia for his final wartime posting.

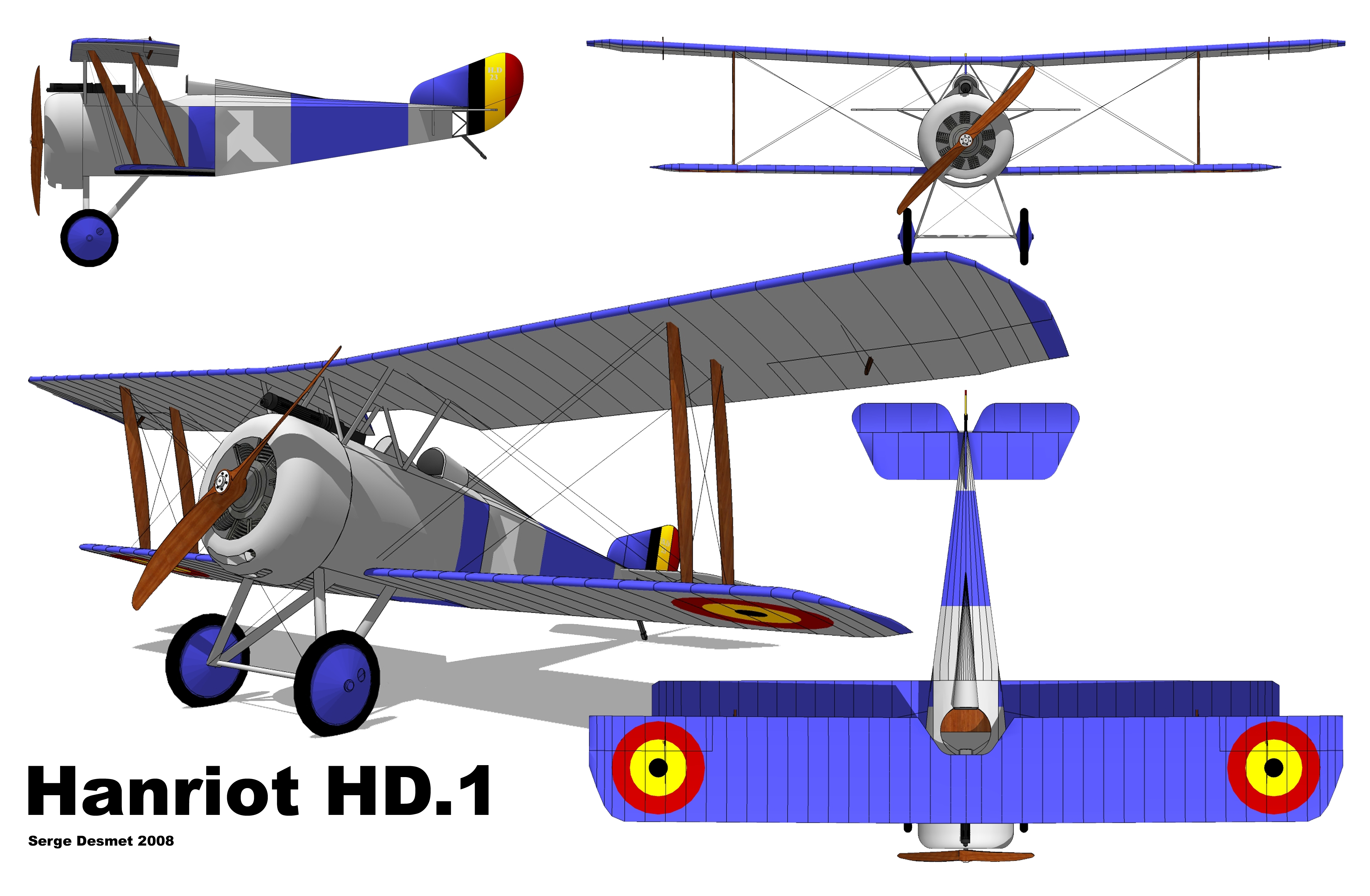
Hanriot HD-1

He scored his first victory the day after Christmas, 1917, teaming with his wingman to send an enemy reconnaissance plane down in flames. Mecozzi eagerly rushed off to the wreckage of his victim, only to find outraged farmers whose barn was burning along the wrecked plane. On 26 May 1918, he used his Hanriot HD.1 to pick off a second reconnaissance machine with a hundred round burst, then ran his guns dry to down an Austro-Hungarian Albatros D.III from Fliegerkompanie 42j. On 15 June 1918, he teamed with Antonio Riva to shoot down a Hansa-Brandenburg C.I. Also in June, Mecozzi was noted as changing his aircraft's insignia from a question mark on a black ball to two blue bands around the fuselage. On 27 July, in conjunction with another pilot, he shot down Hansa-Brandenburg C.I No. 169.14 for his fifth victory. Mecozzi would go on to claim an observation balloon in June and three more aeroplanes in October 1918 but these four wins went unconfirmed. Mecozzi served with 78a Squadriglia past war's end, until February 1919. Having scored all of his victories in the Hanriot HD.1 he was one of the most successful pilots in the type, along with Willy Coppens.

== Post-war ==
Mecozzi was awarded the Silver Medal for Military Merit in the post-war honors list. The committee evaluating aerial victories confirmed five of his victories. He stayed in the military postwar and ascended through the ranks. Mecozzi was accepted for permanent service on 31 October 1919. He was a member of the Italian Aviation Mission to Paris. He also served with the Technical Directorate of the Italian Air Force at Montecelio; there he had opportunity to fly confiscated airplanes, such as German Fokker D.VII, Albatros, Pfalz and Fokker D.VIII fighters, as well as Austro-Hungarian Phönix fighters. In 1926, he began a stint at public relations for the Italian Air Ministry. On 29 July 1927, he was promoted to Major (maggiore. On 10 October 1929, he was given command of 7 Gruppo.

Mecozzi developed a theory of military aviation which was dubbed the "Attack air force" or "Assault aviation" doctrine. Its emphasis was on attacking military targets rather than civilians and civil industry. This put him in frequent opposition to Douhet and his theory of strategic bombing. Mecozzi continued to be promoted, becoming a Brigadier general (generale di Brigata) on 8 April 1937. Mecozzi was invalided from duty and became president of the national aviation club. He also published the Editoriale Aeronautica of the Air Ministry.

After World War II, he retired at the rank of Generale. For some years after that, he edited Rivista Aeronautica, a supposedly independent magazine covertly supported by the air force. Mecozzi also campaigned for a national air museum for Italy. Mecozzi became eccentric; he wore his flying suit to the magazine's offices. Towards the end of his life, he escaped talking about his early combat experiences by becoming mute. He died on 2 November 1971 in his native Rome.
