= Antonio Amantea =

Italian World War I flying ace

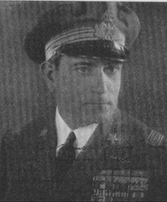
- Born: 28 September 1894; Lecce, Italy
- Died: 13 July 1983 (aged 88); Lecce, Italy
- Military career
- Allegiance: Italy
- Branch: Artillery; aviation
- Service years: 1914 - 1918
- Rank: Sottotenente
- Units: 43a Squadriglia, 71a Squadriglia
- Awards: Medal for Military Valor (1 bronze and 3 silver awards)

Sottotenente Antonio Amantea was a World War I flying ace credited with five aerial victories. He lived to become the last surviving Italian ace of the war.

== World War I service ==
Amantea was working as an electrician when he was conscripted into Italian military in September 1914. He volunteered for aviation. A year later, on 1 September 1915, Sergente Amantea pinned on his wings. His first assignment was to fly artillery spotting missions in a Caudron G-3 on the Isonzo front. He flew 173 combat sorties over the next few months before being picked for fighter training in February 1917. In late March, he returned to action as a member of 71a Squadriglia, flying over the Asiago plateau.

On 2 August 1917, he scored his first confirmed victory, although he had to break off his attack because of a bum magneto and sputtering engine and crashland his own plane. He submitted a claim for the 23rd that went unverified. However, he had better luck the next day, sharing a confirmed win over an Albatros D.III with Antonio Riva but not having a solo second victory confirmed. In December 1917, he upgraded to piloting a Spad VII. By the time he ended his triumphant string on 3 May 1918, he had posted nine victory claims to have five confirmed under the stringent rules used by the Italians.

== Postwar ==
Amantea left Italian aviation with the rank of Tenente. In 1922, he returned. He fought in the Ethiopian War, and worked his way up to Colonello by June 1940, when Italy entered World War II. He was commanding Galatina Airfield when Italy declared its armistice on 8 September 1943. Although his airmen were few and poorly armed, General Amantea organized the defence of the airfield against the Germans forcing them to leave the area, being able then to give the undamaged base to the Allied troops. He served three more years, retiring in 1946. By the time of his death on 13 July 1983 in Lecce, he was the last surviving Italian ace from World War I.
