= Umberto Calvello =

Italian flying ace (1897–1919)

- Born: 28 May 1897; Pistoia, Kingdom of Italy
- Died: 10 August 1919 (aged 22); Venice, Kingdom of Italy
- Military career
- Allegiance: Italy
- Branch: Flying service
- Rank: Sottotenente de Vascello (Naval lieutenant)
- Unit: 260a Squadriglia
- Awards: Medal for Military Valor (2 silver awards, 1 bronze)

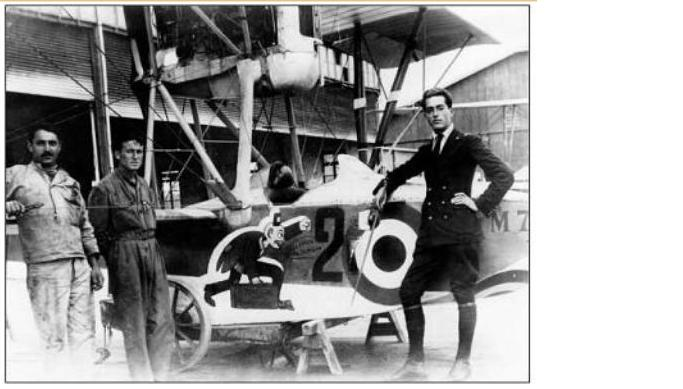
Calvello beside his Macchi M.5 with the insignia of Happy Hooligan

Sottotenente de Vascello Umberto Calvello was a World War I fighter ace credited with five victories.

== Biography ==
Umberto Calvello was born in Pistoia, Kingdom of Italy on 28 May 1897. His father was a general; his grandfather was an admiral for the Kingdom of Two Sicilies.

He began his naval aviation career as an aerial observer for 251a Squadriglia. As such, he won a Bronze Medal for Military Valor for a night raid on Trieste, and its stormy return, on 30 June 1917. He progressed first to being the pilot of a two-seater reconnaissance craft during Summer 1917, flying 18 sorties in October and November. He then progressed to piloting single-seater fighters. In Spring 1918, he was posted to the 260a Squadriglia of the Italian Air Force, and was stationed near Venice. Calvello scored his first aerial victory on 22 April 1918, and three more are known on 4 May 1918; all were victories shared with Federico Martinengo and other wingmen. A postwar evaluation of aces' records granted him a fifth victory, but details of it are unknown.

Calvello also flew some interesting missions besides combat sorties. On several occasions, he made espionage flights behind enemy lines, to resupply spies with carrier pigeons. On 31 October 1918, he was downed into a swamp, but rescued by a squadronmate.

Umberto Calvello died on 10 August 1919, when his SIAI S.9 flying boat developed engine problems and crashed.
