= Valdobbiadene =

Valdobbiadene Valdobiàden (Venetian)
- Comune
- Comune di Valdobbiadene
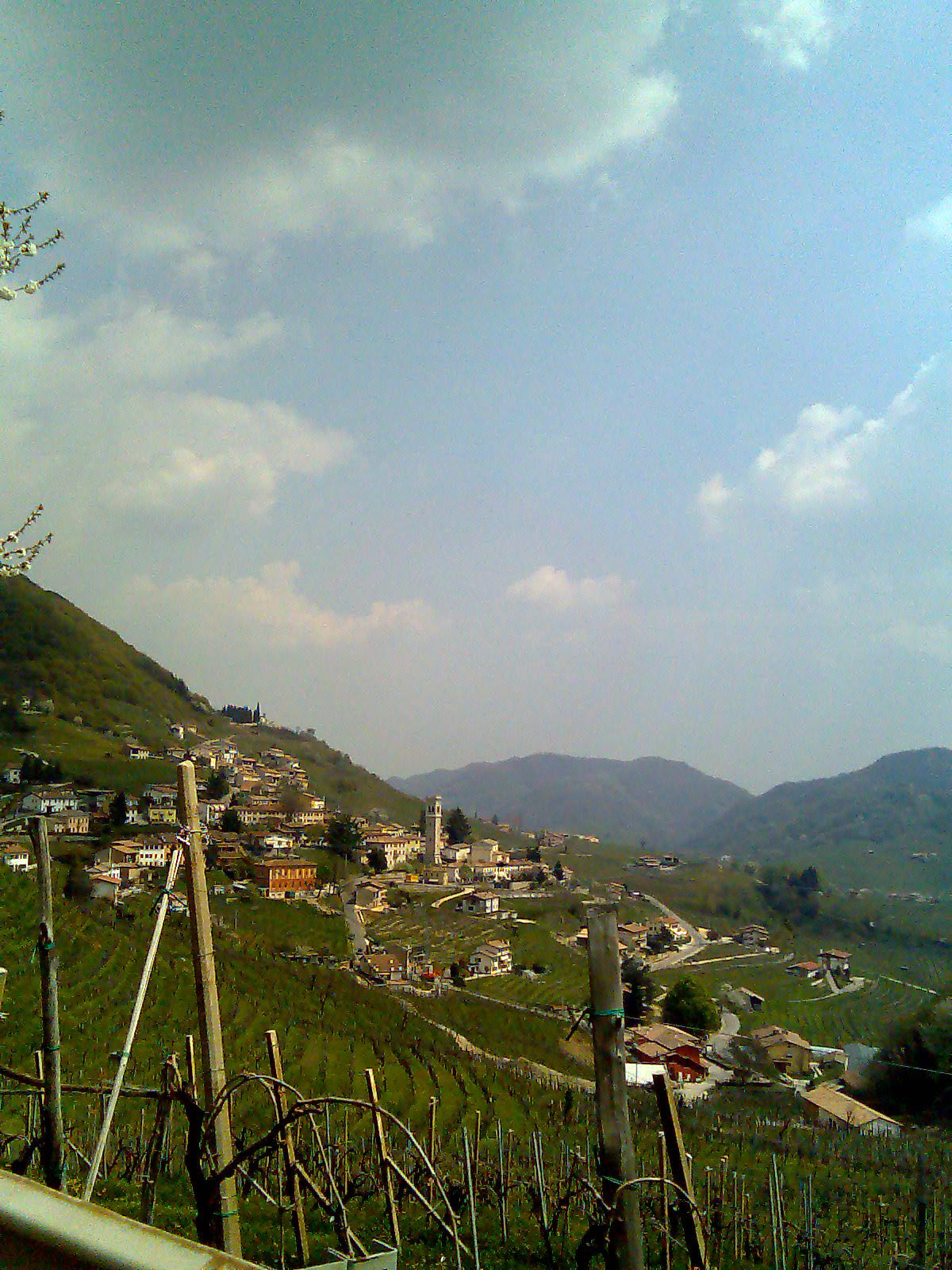
- Valdobbiadene

- Location within Italy Location within Veneto
- Coordinates: 45°54′N 11°55′E
- Country: Italy
- Region: Veneto
- Province: Treviso (TV)
- Frazioni: Bigolino, Guia, San Giovanni, San Pietro di Barbozza, Santo Stefano, San Vito Località: Follo, Funer, Guietta, Pianezze, Ron, Saccol, San Giovanni, Soprapiana, Villanova, Zecchei

Government
  - Mayor: Luciano Fregonese

Area
  - Total: 60.70 km^{2} (23.44 sq mi)
- Elevation: 247 m (810 ft)

Population (30 November 2025)
  - Total: 9,865
  - Density: 162.5/km^{2} (420.9/sq mi)
- Demonym: Valdobbiadenesi
- Time zone: UTC+1 (CET)
  - Summer (DST): UTC+2 (CEST)
- Postal code: 31049
- Dialing code: 0423
- Patron saint: St. Gregory the Great
- Saint day: Second Monday in March
- Website: Official website

UNESCO World Heritage Site
- Official name: Le Colline del Prosecco di Conegliano e Valdobbiadene
- Criteria: Cultural: (v)
- Designated: 2019 (43rd session)
- Reference no.: 1571
- Region: Southern Europe

Valdobbiadene (Italian: [ˌvaldobˈbjaːdene]; Venetian: Valdobiàden) is a town and comune (municipality) in the province of Treviso, Veneto, Italy.

The saint Venantius Fortunatus was born in the town in the 6th century.

Valdobbiadene is a wine growing area: located below the Alpine-Dolomite areas of Veneto, the climate allows the cultivation of the Glera variety of grape. The Conegliano Valdobbiadene area is the home of the best Prosecco, an extra dry sparkling white wine. Prosecco brands that derive from this area include Altaneve, Bisol, Mionetto, Col Vetoraz, Coda, Valdo and others. On 7 July 2019, Le Colline del Prosecco di Conegliano e Valdobbiadene was inscribed as a UNESCO World Heritage Site.

== History ==
The territory was subjected to Treviso until 1178, after which it was occupied by the Ezzelini family until 1260, when it returned under the jurisdiction of Treviso. Constantly plagued by battles and depredations, around the middle of the 14th century it fell under Venetian domination: this put an end to feudalism and, while respecting the political power of the Serenissima, Valdobbiadene was divided into its fifteen rural communities (so-called "Rules"), obtains a semblance of autonomy with the self-government of the Merighi, men democratically elected among the heads of the family. With the arrival of Napoleon and then, with the Austrian domination, the Regole disappeared and the Municipalities arose, first three, then two: Valdobbiadene, San Pietro di Barbozza and Bigolino, which survived only a few years (later also San Pietro di Barbozza will be incorporated into the Municipality of Valdobbiadene).

== Monuments and places of interest ==
=== Religious architecture ===
- Cathedral of Santa Maria Assunta
- The church of San Giacomo Apostolo in Guia
- Church of San Giacomo Apostolo, parish church of Guia (attributed to Canova)
- Church of San Giovanni Battista, parish church of San Giovanni, built between 1924 and 1925.
- Church of Saints Vito, Modesto and Crescenzia in the hamlet of San Vito
- Church of Saints Rocco and Sebastiano (Martignago), dating back to 1855
- Church of Santa Maria Assunta (Follo), built between 1866 and 1867 and consecrated on 24 May of that same year.
- Church of San Gregorio Magno (Colderove), built in the 16th century and consecrated in 1603.
- Parish Church of Santo Stefano Protomartire (Saint Stephen)
- Church of San Michele Arcangelo (parish church of Bigolino)
- Parish church of San Pietro di Barbozza
- Church of Sant'Alberto (San Pietro di Barbozza)
- Church of Saints Rocco and Bernardino di Ron
- Church of the Precious Blood in Pianezze (20th century)
- Small church of Sant'Agata, in the Funer area
- The Sanctuary of the Madonna di Caravaggio in Funer
- Church of Santa Margherita di Villanova
- Church of San Martino
- Church of the Madonna of Lourdes in Ponteggio
- Oratory of Santa Maria Assunta, Follo area
- Oratory of Santa Lucia and Santa Fede (Martignago)
- Oratory of Saint Anthony of Padua (Guietta)
- Sanctuary of the Madonna of Caravaggio, in the Funer area
- Church of San Floriano, in via San Floriano.

=== Civil architecture ===
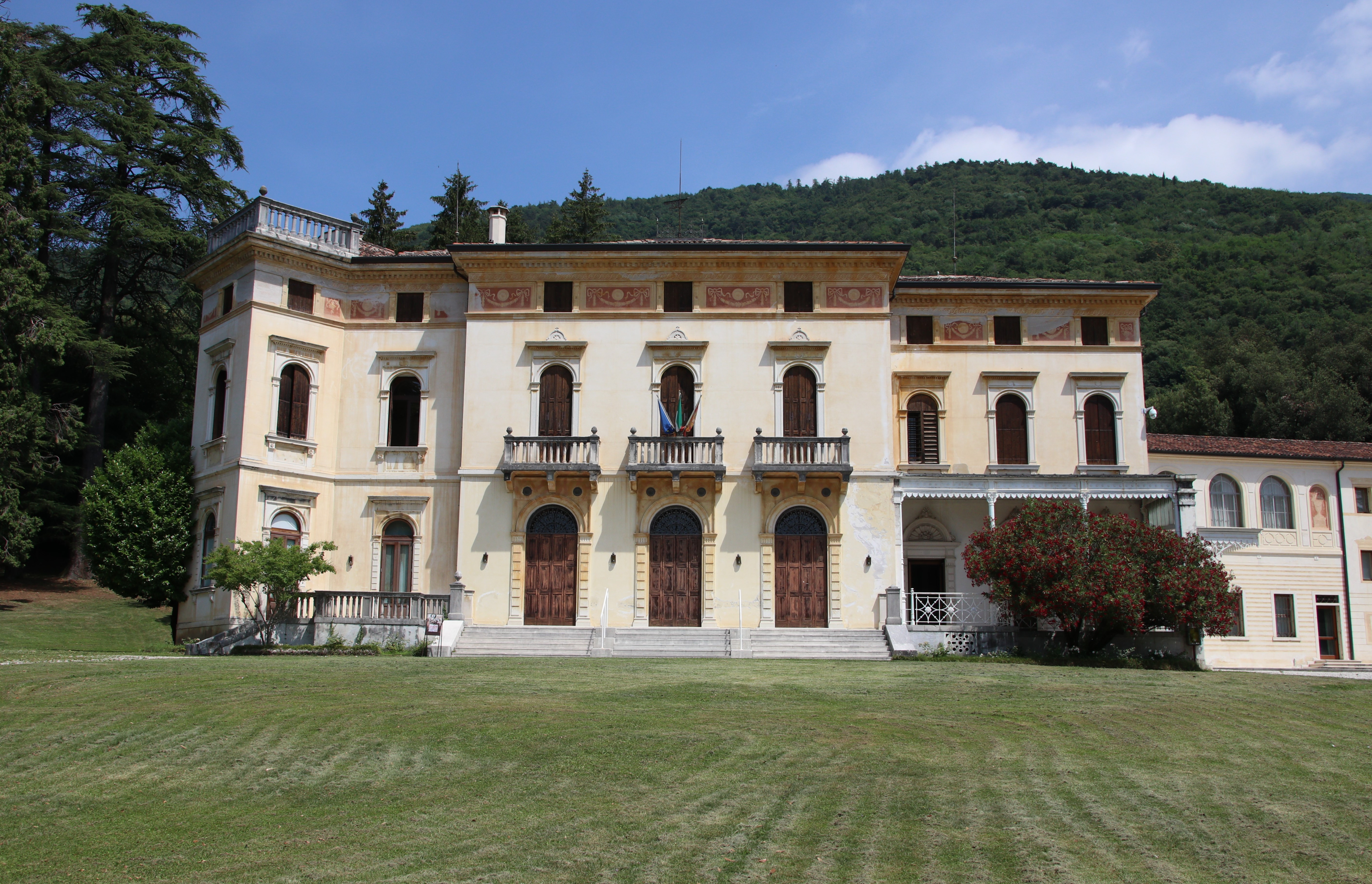
Villa dei Cedri

==== Venetian villas ====
- Villa Barberina Arten Viansson
- Villa Barbon Bennicelli, in the hamlet of San Vito
- Villa Morona De Gastaldis
- Villa dei Cedri, formerly Villa Piva, it lies in the center of Valdobbiadene, within a landscape declared a UNESCO World Heritage Site, in which the work of the winemakers, combined with the nature of the place, has contributed to creating a unique scenario. in the municipality.

=== Natural areas ===
==== Monumental trees ====
In the municipal territory there are 6 monumental trees of the 16 located in the province of Treviso and included in the list of approximately 22,000 trees protected by the forest guard.

== Demographic evolution ==
Historical population

Year	Pop.	±%
1861	?	—
1871	7,931	—
1881	8,488	+7.0%
1901	9,017	+6.2%
1911	9,976	+10.6%
1921	9,624	−3.5%

Year	Pop.	±%
1931	10,443	+8.5%
1936	10,425	−0.2%
1951	10,954	+5.1%
1961	10,739	−2.0%
1971	11,021	+2.6%
1981	11,097	+0.7%

Year	Pop.	±%
1991	10,748	−3.1%
2001	10,624	−1.2%
2011	10,690	+0.6%
2021	10,002	−6.4%

Source: Data from ISTAT

=== Foreign ethnicities and minorities ===
As of January 1st, 2025, foreign residents in the municipality were 1,068, i.e. 10.8% of the population. The largest groups are shown below:

1. North Macedonia 191
2. Morocco 168
3. China 159
4. Romania 139
5. Albania 95
6. Ukraine 72
7. Moldova 54
8. Brazil 37

== Culture ==
=== Instruction ===
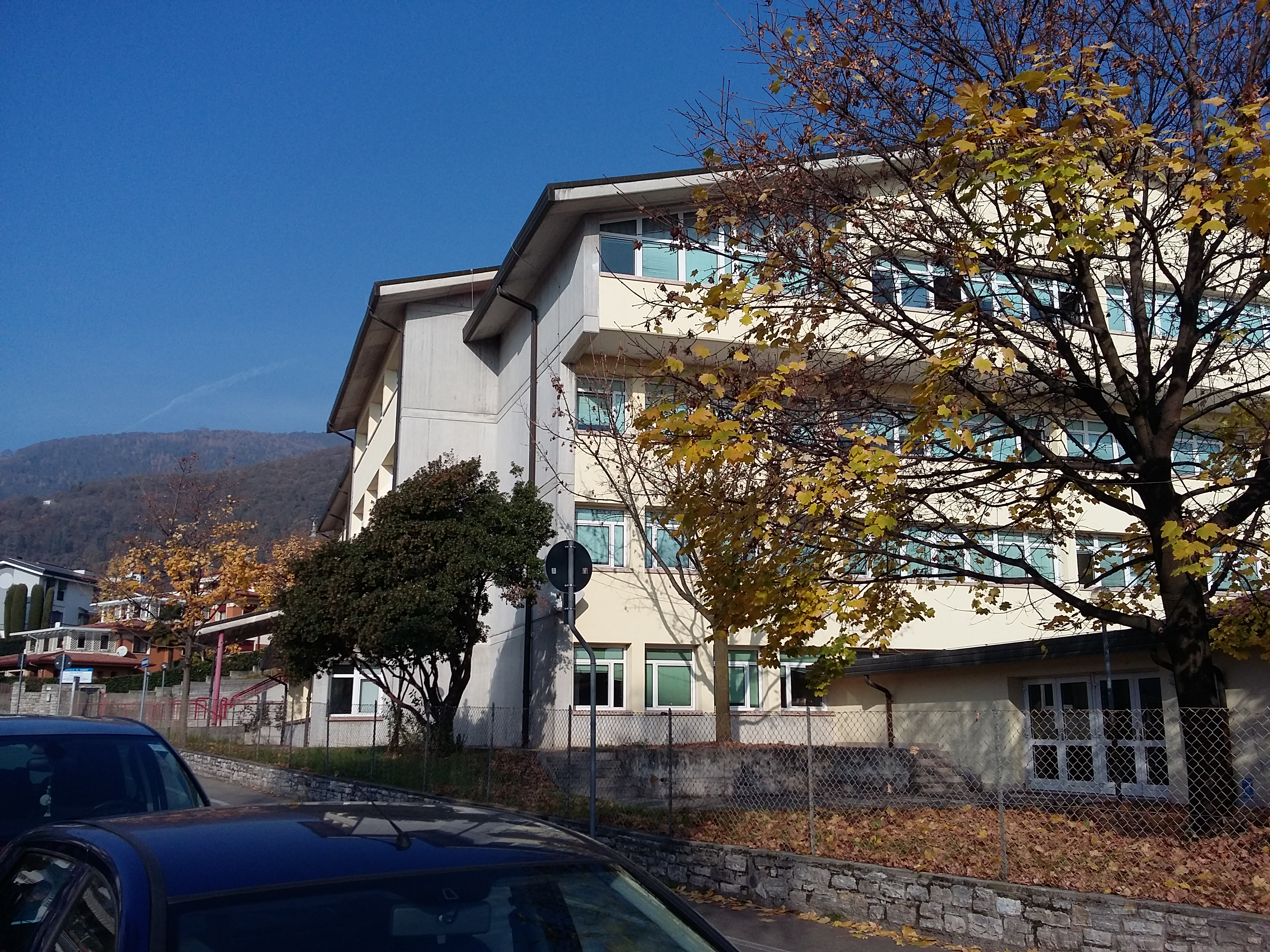
"G. Verdi" Higher Education Institute

In the municipality there are pre-school, primary and lower secondary schools. The secondary school of some importance for the city is the "G. Verdi" Higher Education Institute (I.S.I.S.S.), which hosts the following courses: high school, technical and professional.

It was founded as an autonomous state institute in 1999, aggregating the different courses of study present in the area into a single Higher Secondary Education Institute. In the curriculum design phase, the Verdi Institute took into account both the existing directions and the training and professional needs that the territory expressed.

== Economy ==
The nascent bourgeoisie in the 19th century made up of merchants, notaries, landowners who acquired the lands of the Venetian nobility and who held political power in their hands, embellished the square with palaces. The silk industry develops, thanks to the Piva family. During World War I the territory was the target of heavy bombing and was evacuated. With the return and reconstruction, wine cultivation developed.

Valdobbiadene, nearby Conegliano and their hills are considered the cities of the Prosecco di Conegliano-Valdobbiadene wine and, in particular, of the Superiore di Cartizze type and also included in the Città del Vino circuit and has been the home of the National Sparkling Wine Exhibition, now the Sparkling Wine Forum of Italy, for over forty years.

== Infrastructure and transport ==
Between 1913 and 1931 Valdobbiadene represented the northern terminus of the Montebelluna-Valdobbiadene Tramway, which at the time represented an important development tool for the economy of the area.

The town is served nearby by the Alano-Fener-Valdobbiadene station on the Calalzo-Padova railway, connected directly by the MOM with bus line n.126, while the center of Valdobbiadene is connected to Treviso by the MOM bus line n.110: Treviso, Postioma, Montebelluna, Valdobbiadene.

Prosecco Hills Link is the new intermodal solution created between Trenitalia and MOM-Mobilità di Marca, arriving in Conegliano by train and continuting to the Prosecco Hills of Conegliano and Valdobbiadene by a bus

== Gallery ==
Towards Mount Cesen

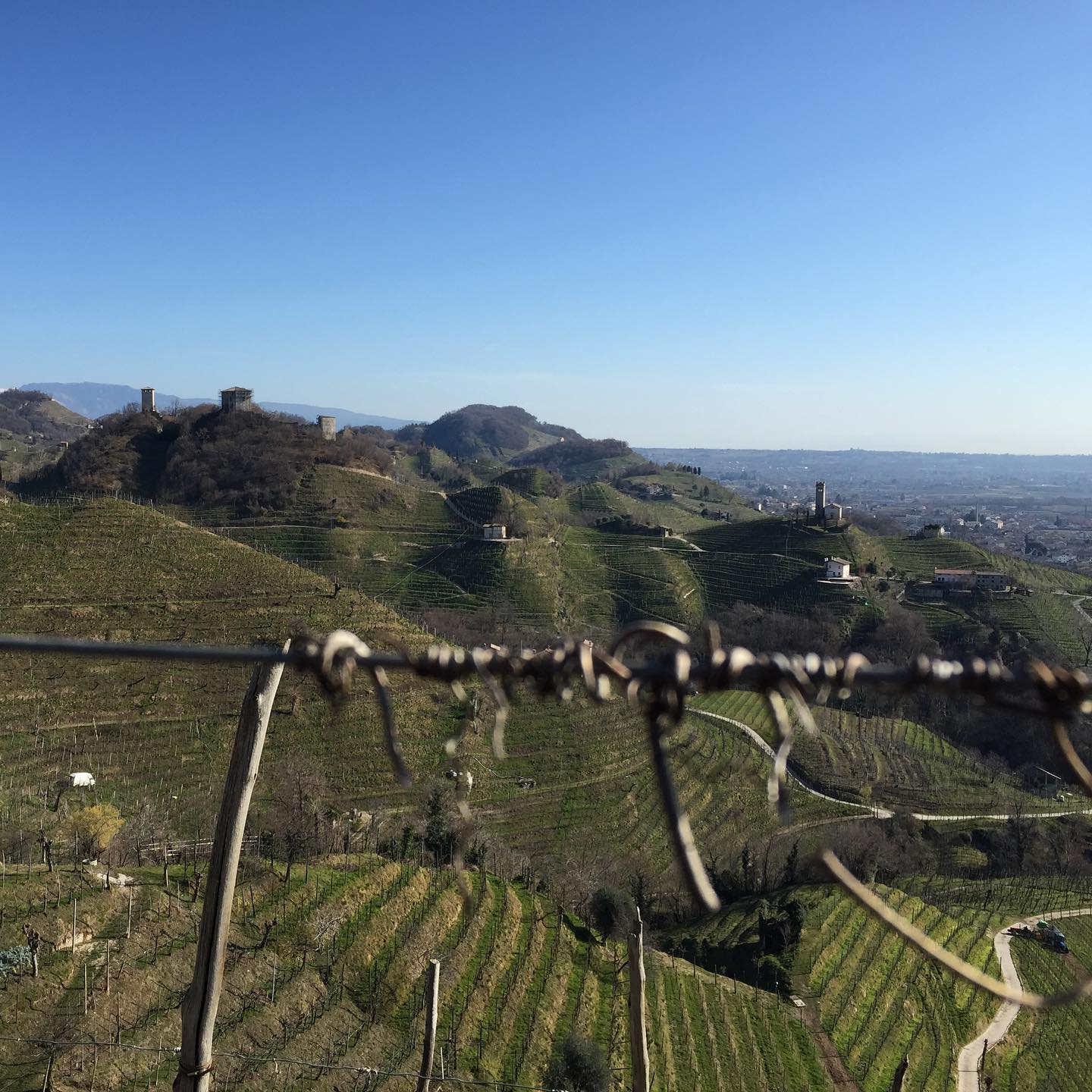
Prosecco Valley

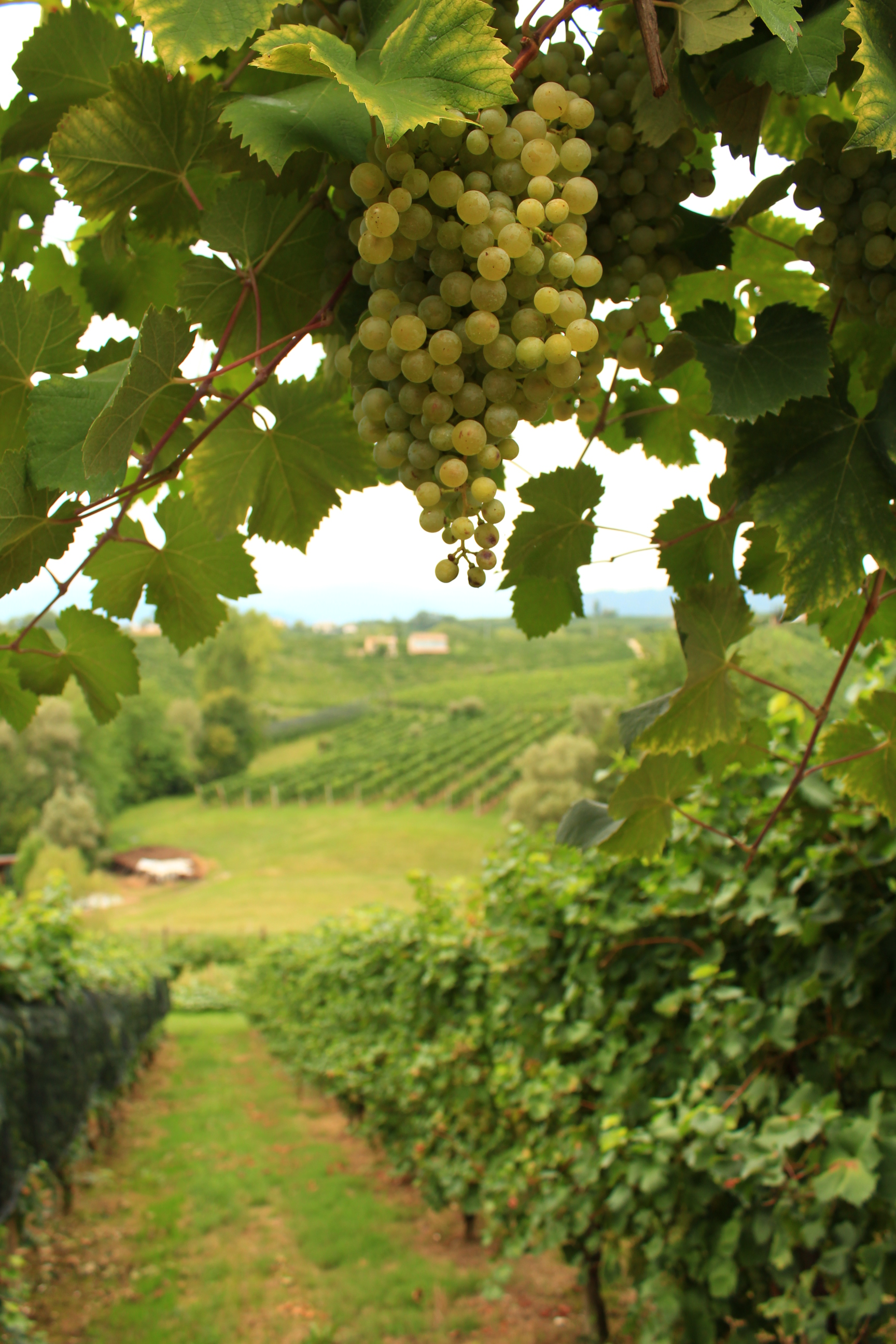
Prosecco San Vito

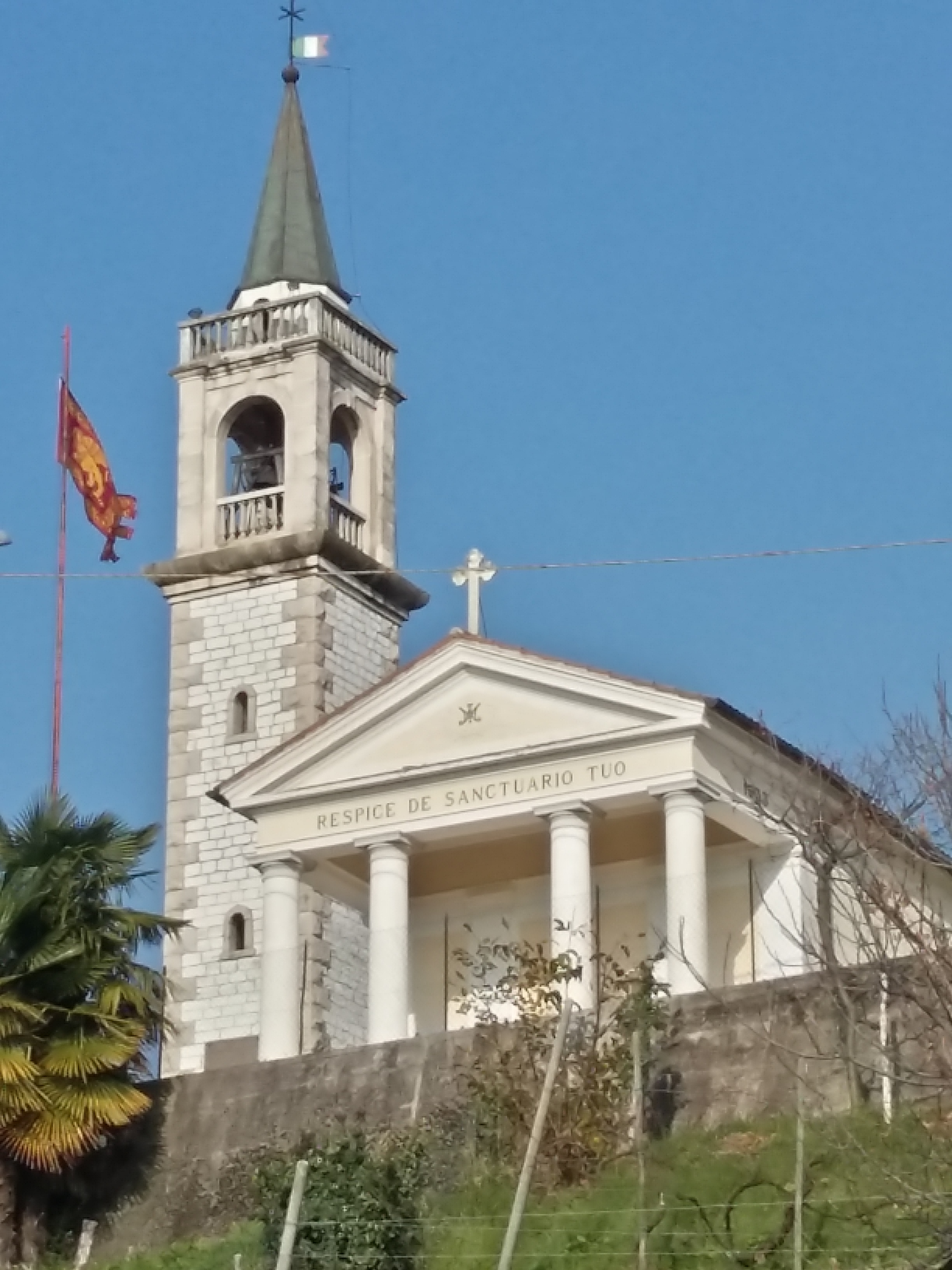
Ponteggio - little church of Our Lady of Lourdes

== Twin towns ==
Valdobbiadene is twinned with:

- Mór, Hungary
