= Alessandro Resch =

Italian flying ace (1892–1966)

- Born: 19 November 1892; Avezzano, L'Aquila, Kingdom of Italy
- Died: 8 January 1966 (aged 73); Avezzano, L'Aquila, Italy
- Military career
- Allegiance: Italy
- Branch: Flying service
- Service years: 1916 - 1918
- Rank: tenente-colonnello
- Units: 26a Squadrone, 70a Squadrone
- Awards: Medal for Military Valor (Silver and Bronze awards), two awards of the Croce di Guerra
- Other work: Pioneering airline pilot

Tenente-colonnello Alessandro Resch was an Italian World War I flying ace credited with five confirmed aerial victories (though there is historical evidence of a sixth). After surviving World War I, he would become a pioneering airline captain, flying 500,000 miles between 1928 and 1935. He would return to the Italian Air Force as a major in 1935, rising to tenente-colonnello by 1939. His participation in World War II is unknown.

== Early life and service ==
Alessandro Resch was born in Avezzano, Kingdom of Italy on 19 November 1892. He was the son of a businessman. He was interested in cycling as a youth. When he was conscripted, he went into a cyclist battalion of Bersaglieri. He was promoted to caporale and became a truck driver carrying messages to the front. After a promotion to sergente, Resch requested and received pilot's training as an officer cadet. On 9 June 1916, Resch evacuated a wounded officer in his truck during the fighting for Monfalcone. He received his first and second pilot's licenses on Voisins, on 16 June and 1 July 1916.

== Aerial service ==
On 8 July 1916, he joined 26a Squadriglia. On 15 August, he was on a bombing mission to Reifenberg Railway Station when his Voisin came under attack over Komen. Resch's observer, Sottotenente Lioy, emptied two magazines of machine gun fire at one of two enemy Fokker E.IIIs as they closed in on a stern assault. Resch dove on the second Fokker while Lioy emptied two more magazines. One Fokker's wing came off. The other one retreated. The Italian crew returned to base with 30 bullet holes in their Voisin. Unknown to them, both Fokkers had crashed; the Austro-Hungarians believed they had been lost in a midair collision. The Italians, in a rare bit of under-claiming, filed for a single victory. On 22 August, Resch was nicked by a shell splinter. Shortly afterwards, he received a Silver award of the Medal for Military Valor.

In May 1917, he reported for training as a fighter pilot. He qualified as a Nieuport pilot, then further qualified to fly the Savoia-Pomilio SP.2 in September. He was commissioned and assigned to 70a Squadriglia in October, though he did not report for duty until 12 December 1917. When German airplanes attacked Istrana, Resch tried to launch to counter them, but his airplane was hit while he taxied on the runway and he had to abort the attempt.

On 17 April 1918, he used a Hanriot HD.1 to share in a triple night victory over Valdobbiadene. Just five days later, the fuel tank in Hanriot HD.I No. 6252 ruptured while Resch was flying it. Drenched in fuel, the Italian pilot could only shut down the engine and try for the nearest airfield. His dead stick landing of his winged Molotov cocktail was foiled by unfavorable wind, and he capsized upon setting down short of the runway. No fire resulted.

On 12 July 1918, Resch repeatedly fired into an Albatros D.III, which fell in a flutter emitting puffs of smoke. Alessandro Resch was officially an ace, two years after his first victory. Although that was Resch's last credited victory, he served through war's end. When the Armistice came, he had earned a bronze medal for Military Valor and two War Merit Crosses to add to his prior silver medal for Military Valor. The postwar committee that evaluated aerial victories sent Resch a letter confirming his five victories, though it enumerated only four.

== Post World War I career ==
Resch transferred to 91a Squadriglia on 10 January 1919. At some point, he left the military, but returned to service in 1927. However, he went to work for Avio Linee Italian Airlines as chief pilot and captain on 1 September 1928. He flew half a million miles over the next 7 years. In 1935, he returned once more to military service, this time as a maggiore. By 1939, he had risen to tenente-colonnello.

Further details are unknown, except that Alessandro Resch died in Avezzano on 8 January 1966.
