= Mario Fucini =

Italian World War I flying ace

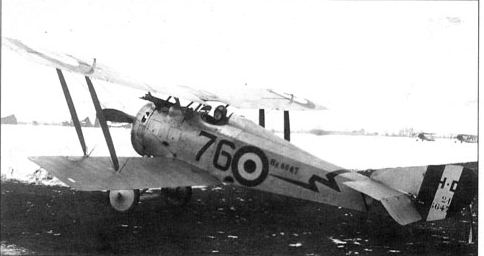
- Born: 1 February 1891; Empoli, Italy
- Died: 1 September 1977 (aged 86); Rome, Italy
- Military career
- Allegiance: Italy
- Branch: Engineers; aviation
- Service years: c. 1915 – 15 September 1937
- Rank: Tenente
- Units: Sez Duf Grittaglie, 5a Squadriglia/25a Squadriglia, 84a Squadriglia, 87a Squadriglia, 76a Squadriglia, 78a Squadriglia
- Commands: 29a Squadriglia, 78a Squadriglia, Castiglione Fighter School
- Awards: 2 Silver and 1 Bronze Medal for Military Valor
- Other work: Held commands in postwar Italian military aviation

Tenente (later General) Mario Fucini was a World War I flying ace who claimed credit for 13 aerial victories during the war; seven of these were confirmed in 1919.

He would remain in the Italian air force after World War I, rising through squadron commands to head up the Castiglione Fighter School.

== Biography ==
Mario Fucini was born on 1 February 1891 in Empoli. As World War I began, he volunteered for military service in the engineers. He was appointed as a Sottotenente on 9 May 1915. After a transfer to the Corpo Aeronautico Militare, he earned a pilot's license on 13 March 1916.

The following month, he qualified to fly Voisins. On 12 April 1916, he was assigned as a pilot to 5a Squadriglia Voisin (later to become 25a Squadriglia). On 28 July 1916, he completed a bombing sortie despite constant attacks by a pair of enemy fighters; he was awarded a Silver Medal for Military Valor for this feat.

On 16 February 1917, he brought back his flaming Voisin to a landing at Monfalcone; he received a bronze medal for Military Valor for saving the craft and himself. The next month, he underwent conversion training to the Pomilio PC. This was followed by a May stint in gunnery school in Pisa. It was about this time that he was promoted to Tenente.

On 1 July 1917, he was assigned to a fighter squadron, 84a Squadriglia. A fortnight later, he was appointed to command the Grottaglie Defense Section. Here he flew a Nieuport. In September 1917, he reported to Malpensa for conversion training on the Ansaldo SVA. On 27 September, he was posted to the nascent 87a Squadriglia. Towards the end of 1917, he moved on to 76a Squadriglia, with the official date of transfer being 5 December. However, he submitted two victory claims with the squadron prior to that date. At any rate, by year's end he was known to be flying a Hanriot HD.1, which he used through war's end.

On 18 February 1918, he was transferred to 78a Squadriglia. He would continue to post victory claims, tallying 13 before war's end. His diligence was rewarded with a second silver medal for Military Valor, received 15 August 1918. On 3 November, even as the Austro-Hungarian foe surrendered, Fucini was admitted to hospital. A week later, he was assigned to the Technical Section in Turin.

On 1 February 1919, the Bongiovanni military intelligence commission credited Mario Fucini with seven confirmed aerial victories. He remained in aviation as the Corpo became the Regia Aeronautica, rising to successive commands of 29a Squadriglia and 78a Squadriglia. In 1931, he was promoted to Tenente Colonnello. In 1932, he published Voli sul nemico, his memoirs. He was given command of the Castiglione Fighter School in 1933. From December 1933 through August 1925, Fucini edited the official journal of the Regia Aeronautica, the Rivista Aeronautica. He retired from active duty on 15 September 1937. However, in April 1953, he was promoted to General in the reserves.

Mario Fucini died in Rome, Italy on 1 September 1977.
