= Cosimo Rennella =

Italian-born Ecuadorian World War I flying ace

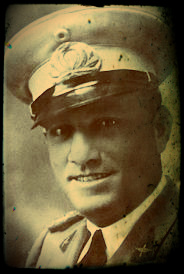
- Born: 15 February 1890; Naples, Italy
- Died: 3 May 1937 (aged 47); Quito, Ecuador
- Military career
- Allegiance: Ecuador; Italy
- Branch: Corpo Aeronautico Militare
- Rank: Lieutenant Colonel
- Nickname: "Cosme"
- Units: 31a Squadriglia; 32a Squadriglia; 45a Squadriglia; 48a Squadriglia; 78a Squadriglia
- Awards: 2 × Silver Medal of Military Valor (Italy); War Merit Cross (Italy); Croix de guerre (France); Croix de guerre (Belgium); Order of Abdon Calderón, 2nd Class (Ecuador)
- Other work: Pioneered civil aviation in South America; helped found Ecuadorian Air Force

Lieutenant Colonel Cosimo Rennella Barbatto (15 February 1890 – 3 May 1937) was an Ecuadorian World War I flying ace of Italian birth. He was credited with seven confirmed aerial victories flying for Italian aviation during the war; however, his pioneering civil aviation activities both before and immediately following the war were probably even more important than his martial career.

== Pre-World War I activities ==
Rennella was born in Italy on 15 February 1890. In 1892 he accompanied his family when they emigrated to Guayaquil, Ecuador. While there, his name was changed to fit the pattern used in many Spanish-speaking countries to be Cosimo Rennella Barbatto by appending his mother's maiden name, though he was usually called "Cosme". In 1909, he volunteered to serve in the Patria I Battalion in military operations against Peru.

In 1911, Rennella persuaded a local sportsman's club, the Club Guayas de Tiro y Aviacion (Guayas Shooting and Aviation Club), to sponsor his pilot's training; his aim was to be the first flier in Ecuador. The club underwrote Rennella's journey to Pau, France to learn to fly. There Rennella became a pilot using French Blériot military aircraft. He finally qualified for his civil pilot's license at Turin's Chiribiri flying school on 24 August 1912. Following that, he accompanied a pair of Nieuportish monoplanes back across the Atlantic to Panama.

By the time Rennella and his two traveling companions returned to Central America with an aircraft, the first flight in Ecuador, which was by Chilean Eduardo Molina Lavín, had taken place in their absence. Rennella's new aircraft was a copy of a French Nieuport, built by Navaro and Valgoi of Turin, Italy. On 15 December 1912, having been forbidden to fly across the Isthmus of Panama by U. S. officials, he flew an unauthorized flight in this aircraft over Panama City, leafletting the town with fliers thanking the populace for their support of his flight, in what may have been the first aerial pamphlet drop in history.

In January 1913, he was welcomed home to Ecuador. Once there, he accepted the obligation of returning to Italy for more training while he supervised the manufacture of a Chiribiri monoplane for his Club sponsors. He brought this aircraft, dubbed Patria No. I, back to Ecuador. He used his time in Italy to qualify for an Italian military pilot's license, which was granted at Turin on 25 July 1913. Rennella was back in Ecuador by 29 September 1913.

On 8 October 1913, at Guayaquil, Cosimo Rennella became the first Ecuadorian citizen to fly in his own country. A follow-up exhibition scheduled for the 19th was cancelled amid controversy over potential gate receipts. Rennella may have briefly served in the Ecuadorian military before barnstorming in Peru, Chile, and Mexico. He founded a flying school in Mexico.

Italy's 24 May 1915 entry into World War I caused his July return to Italy, where he begged the War Ministry to allow him to volunteer to fly for them.

== World War I ==
Rennella entered aviation training in Pisa on 17 September 1915. He qualified as a Farman student on 1 February 1916. On 6 February, he transferred to training at Busto Aristo. In April, he moved to Turin to qualify on the more advanced Maurice Farman 14. Finally, rated as a Caporal, he was posted to duty with a reconnaissance squadron, 31a Squadriglia on 14 April 1916. He flew his first combat sortie the next day. He transferred twice more to other reconnaissance squadrons—48a Squadriglia on 1 May, 45a Squadriglia on 12 July 1916. He survived an enemy attack on his aircraft on 6 August. On 31 August, he was promoted to Sergente.

Rennella served as a pilot flying two-seaters until 23 June 1917, when he passed the physical examination to become a fighter pilot. He reported to Malpensa for training, and qualified on a Nieuport 11 on 7 August. On the 9th, he began gunnery training at Pisa. On 14 August 1917, he reported to 78a Squadriglia.

Between 24 September 1917 and 31 August 1918, as he flew with 78a Squadriglia of the Corpo Aeronautico Militare, he scored seven confirmed aerial victories, having 11 other claims go unconfirmed. He began his string of victories flying a Nieuport 17, but re-equipped with a Hanriot HD.1. As his victories mounted, he wrote letters home to the Ecuadorian press describing his experiences.

== Post World War I ==
The Bongiovanni military intelligence commission released its report on aerial victories on 1 February 1919; seven of Rennella's victory claims were verified. By the time Rennella reportedly left the Corpo Aeronautico Militare in March 1919, he had been honored with two awards of the Silver Medal of Military Valor and the War Merit Cross from Italy, the French Croix de guerre, and the Belgian Croix de guerre.

Rennella returned to South America in early 1920. In February 1920, Rennella was involved in a business enterprise at La Guaira, Venezuela. On February 27, he flew a Hanriot HD.1 fighter at Caracas. The next day, Rennella flew from Caracas to Maracay. Continuing his operations through March, he subsequently pioneered inter-urban flights in Venezuela; he also flew at least one airmail flight. He is sometimes mistakenly credited with the first Venezuelan military flight because he used a war surplus fighter for his flights. However, he is credited with establishing a flying school at Maracay.

Rennella returned to Ecuador in 1924 to join its fledgling air force as a Capitano. In August 1932, he flew the Ecuadorian Air Force's first operational missions. In August 1934, he was awarded Ecuador's Order of Abdon Calderón, Second Class. He was subsequently promoted to major.

In early 1937, Cosimo Rennella traveled to a convention of World War I aces in Dayton, Ohio. Upon his return, he was admitted to the military hospital in Quito with pneumonia. He died there on 3 May 1937. He was posthumously promoted to lieutenant colonel.

== Legacy ==
Today, celebrations are held in Guayaquil with a replica of the biplane paraded through the streets together with that of a Kfir fighter. At Air Force Base Simón Bolívar there is scheduled an air show involving over 50 aircraft of different types.

== Sources ==
- Franks, Norman; Guest, Russell F. & Alegi, Gregory (1997). Above the War Fronts: The British Two-seater Bomber Pilot and Observer Aces, the British Two-seater Fighter Observer Aces, and the Belgian, Italian, Austro-Hungarian and Russian Fighter Aces, 1914–1918. London, UK: Grub Street. ISBN 978-1-898697-56-5.
- Hagedorn, Dan (2008). Conquistadors of the Sky: A History of Aviation in Latin America. University Press of Florida. ISBN 978-0-8130-3249-8..
