= Romanian Air Corps =

- Corpul de Aviație
- Active: 1 April 1913 – 23 August 1915 as Serviciul de Aeronautică Militară; 23 August 1915 – 1 January 1924
- Country: Kingdom of Romania
- Branch: Romanian Army
- Type: Air corps
- Role: Aerial warfare
- Engagements: Second Balkan War; First World War; Hungarian–Romanian War

Commanders
- Notable commanders: Constantin Găvănescu (Note: His name also appears spelled as Găvănescul.) – first commander (1915–1916); see also Air commanders of World War I § Romania

Aircraft flown
- List of aircraft of the Romanian Air Force § Beginnings & World War I

The Romanian Air Corps or Aviation Corps (RAC) (Romanian: Corpul de Aviație) was the air arm of the Romanian army until the formation of the Romanian Air Force. It was established on 1 April 1913 as the Military Aeronautics Service (Serviciul de Aeronautică Militară) and subordinated to the Engineer Inspectorate, being organized in two branches – the aviation and the balloon branch. On 23 August 1915, the RAC was formed as an independent military arm and operated until 1 January 1924 when it became an equal to the Army and Navy, being redesignated as the Royal Romanian Air Force (Aeronautica Regală Română).

In 1913, the newly established Military Aeronautics Service participated in the Second Balkan War. Being organized in two sections, the Aeronautics Service carried out reconnaissance, liaison and leaflet dropping missions over Bulgaria.

In 1915, the Air Corps gained independence from the Engineer Inspectorate. When Romania entered the First World War on the Allied side in 1916, the RAC was organized into 4 squadron groups, each assigned to an army, and 4 balloon sections. Limited by the few aircraft the Corps had available, the Romanian airmen carried out mainly aerial reconnaissance and photography missions, though bombing missions with Romanian-made bombs were also executed. At the end of 1916, the RAC was reorganized with the help of the French Military Mission. After the reorganization, it had 3 Aeronautical Groups, each assigned to a Romanian or Russian army, and 5 balloon companies.

== Beginnings ==
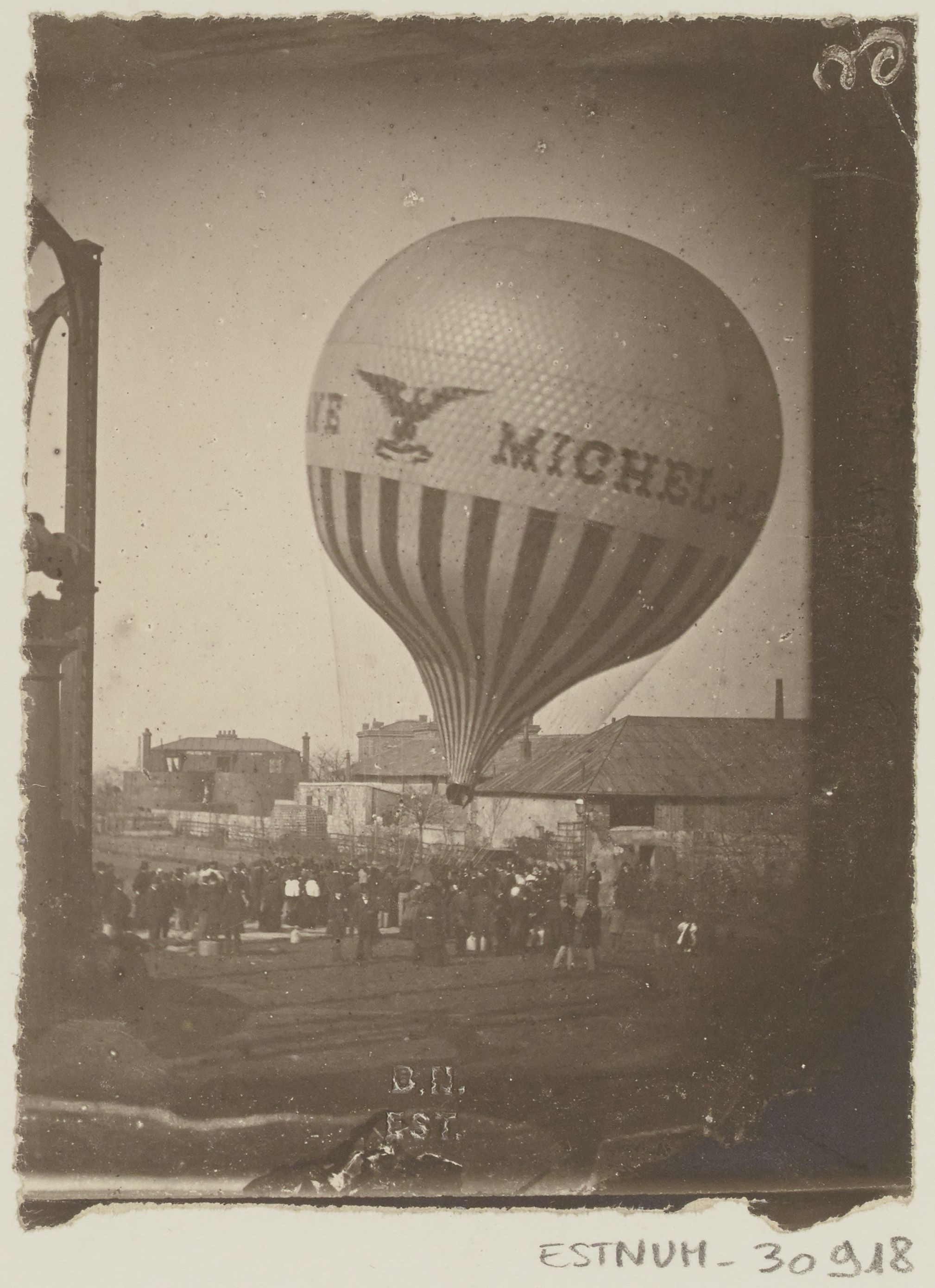
"Mihai Bravul" (Michel-le-Brave), Willemot's balloon in France, 1874

The first flight of Romanian military personnel happened on 2 July [O.S. 20 June] 1874, when Marius Willemot, a French engineer from Bucharest, took Majors (Maj.) Iacob Lahovary, Constantin Poenaru and Dumitrescu in flight over the city with his hydrogen balloon named Mihai Bravul (Michel-le-Brave). The last flight of this balloon took place on 19 [O.S. 7 July] 1874, Willemot flying together with Colonel (Col.) Nicolae Haralambie, Ion Ghica and a third person.

Following the use of a balloon in the military exercises of 1891 and 1892, the first balloon unit of the Romanian Army was established in 1893 as part of the 1st Telegraph Company in the 1st Engineer Regiment, under the command of Lieutenant (Lt.) Eugeniu Asachi. The balloon unit, called the Aerostation Section, was equipped with a French spherical captive balloon, which was replaced with a German kite balloon in 1903. The necessary hydrogen was purchased from Austria-Hungary until 1905 when the equipment needed for its the production and storage was purchased. In the beginning, the captive balloon was used for aerial surveillance in support of the artillery that defended the fortifications of Bucharest. Then, the balloon was used in the field training exercises from 1907-1911. The positive results encouraged the officials to acquire 3 more kite balloons and the necessary mobile devices to produce and store hydrogen, which was used to inflate the balloons, and to transport the equipment into operational theaters.

On 20 November 1909, Cerchez & Co., the first aircraft company, the first aerodrome and the first flight school of Romania was founded at Chitila. The school, conducted by French flight instructors, had five hangars, bleachers for spectators and workshops where Farman airplanes were built under license.

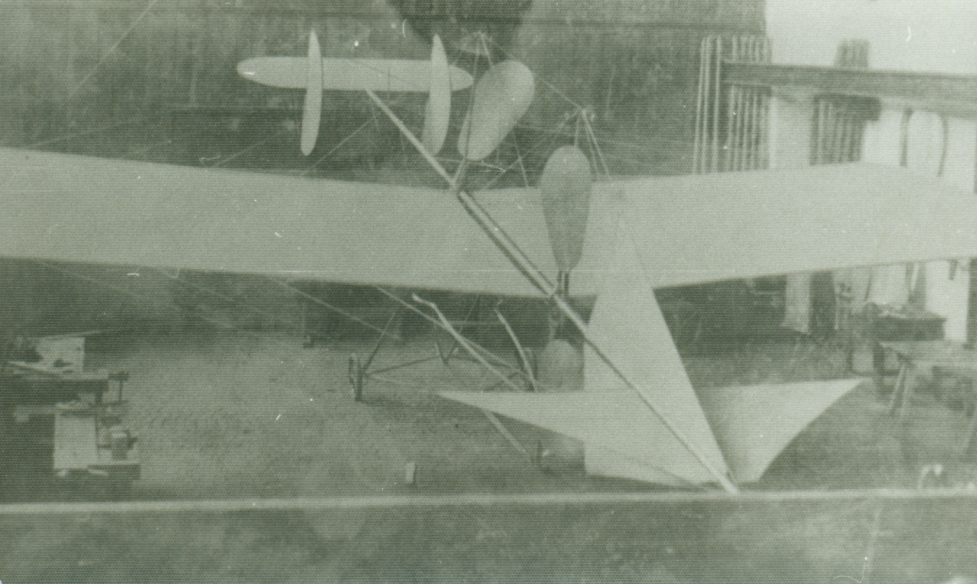
A Vlaicu I under construction

Also in November 1909, the Romanian Minister of War commissioned Aurel Vlaicu to build the A Vlaicu I airplane at the Bucharest Army Arsenal. The aircraft first flew on 17 June 1910. In September, during the fall military exercise, Vlaicu flew his airplane from Slatina to Piatra Olt carrying a message, Romania thus becoming one of the first countries to use airplanes for military purposes. The English historian, Michael J.H. Taylor noting: "In 1910 the Romanian military aviation was established, being one of the nations that adopted aviation for military purposes. The Romanian aviation participated, with great success, in the campaigns of the First World War."

In April 1911, the Ministry of War ordered 4 Farmans, this was followed by an order for 2 more Farmans. These licensed-built airplanes started to be delivered from 30 August. In the same year, the first officers began training at the flight school, Sublocotenent (Second Lieutenant - Slt.) Ștefan Protopopescu receiving the first pilot license in Romania and becoming the first pilot of the Romanian Army. On 1 April 1912, the first military flight training school was established in Cotroceni. Prince George Valentin Bibescu took the initiative to establish the National Air League (Liga Națională Aeriană), on 5 May 1912, which was located in Băneasa. The League was formed with the aim of supporting the national aviation with money and aircraft. This way, the civil society could participate directly in the pilot training and aircraft purchases through public donations. A contract was also signed between the Air League and the Ministry of War, which allowed the training of military pilots at the flight school of Băneasa. The instructors of the flight school were all military pilots.

As a result of the rapid development of aviation, it was necessary to regulate its status within the military. A law on the organization of military aeronautics was issued on 1 April 1913 which organized the military aeronautics in two branches – the aviation and the balloon branch. The Military Aeronautics Service was put under the commanded of the General Inspectorate of Engineering and Aeronautics, led by General (Gen.) Mihail Boteanu. The law also established the Corps of Permanent Airmen (Corpul Aeronauților Permanți), consisting of pilots, air observers and mechanics. It laid down the conditions for admission to flight schools, the system of pilot licensing, the establishment of flight salary premiums, the continuous training of aircrew and the introduction of the higher pilot's license for aviators. This higher pilot's license was given to experienced aviators who performed missions in difficult conditions and its holders were permanently assigned to the Corps of Permanent Airmen. Pilots were required to fly at least 120 hours per year, otherwise, they were excluded from military aviation.

=== Second Balkan War (1913) ===
On 5 July [O.S. 22 June] 1913, Romania mobilized its army against Bulgaria. The Military Aeronautics Service was also mobilized and participated in the campaign which started on 10 July. The Military School and the Aviation Park mobilized 5 "Farmans", which constituted the Section I of Aviation (Secția I de Aviație), commanded by Lt. Ștefan Paraschivescu. Aurel Vlaicu was also assigned to this section with his A Vlaicu II airplane. Liga Națională Aeriană was transformed into the Section II of Aviation, contributing with 13 aircraft: 8 twin-seat Blériot monoplanes with 80 hp engines, 2 single-seat Blériots with 50 hp engines, 2 Farman MF.7 and 1 Blériot XXI with a 70 hp engine.

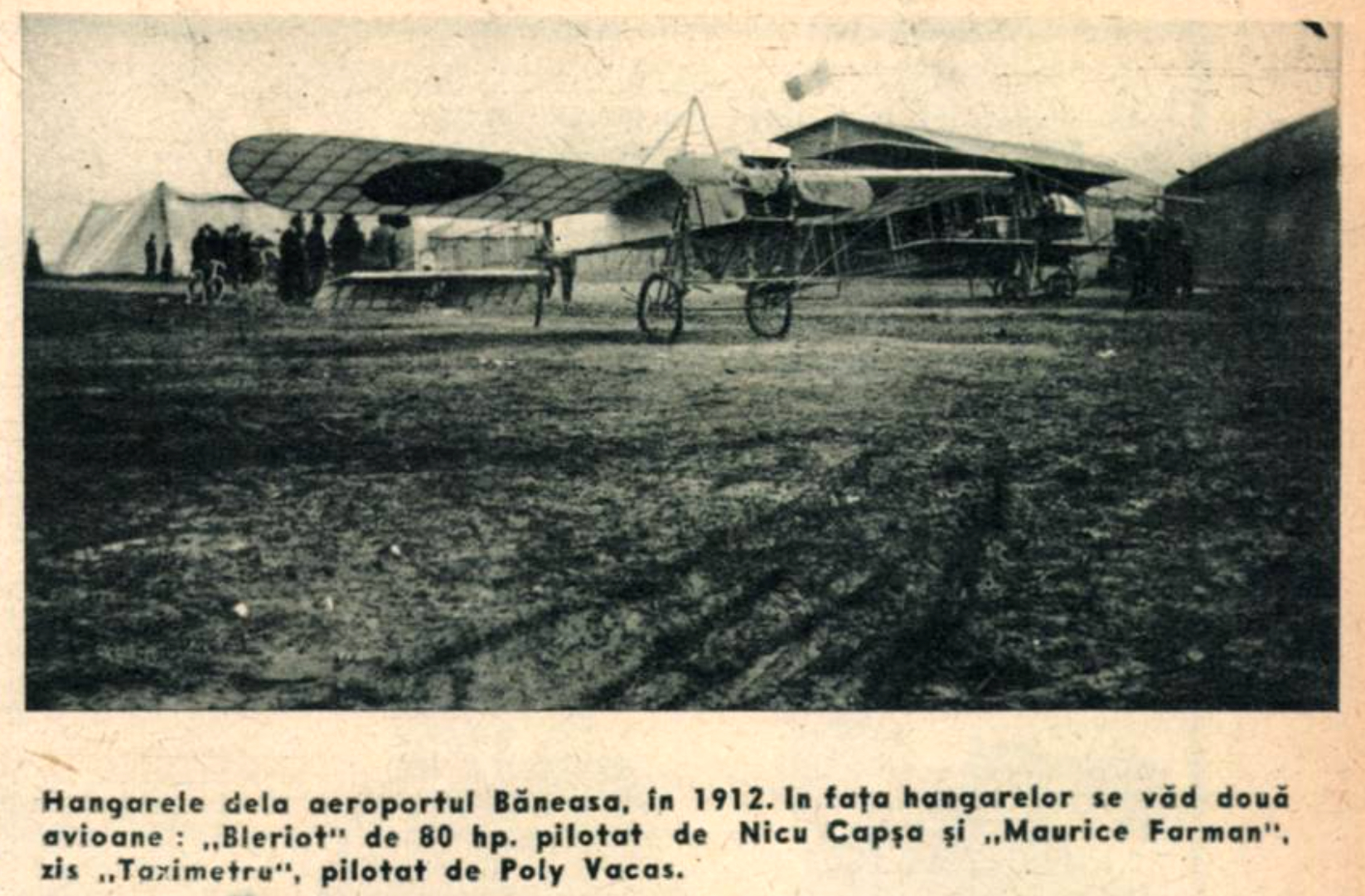
Blériot and Maurice Farman aircraft at Băneasa, 1912

On 24 July, Captain (Cpt.) Constantin Fotescu and Cpt. observer Ioan H. Arion, executed the first combat mission, with a reconnaissance flight following the Vidin - Ferdinandovo road. The Blériot then turned north-west flying over the village of Rabisha where Bulgarian troops were stationed. Two cannon shots were fired on the airplane without effect. On 30 July, two Blériots from No. 1 Squadron, Section II took off. The aircraft were flown by: Lt. Nicolae Capșa with Cpt. observer Ioan H. Arion and Private (Pvt.) Poly Vacas with Cpt. observer Ioan Viieșeanu. The airmen carried out a reconnaissance mission in northern Bulgaria, then landed at Segarcea.

The intensification of reconnaissance missions carried out by Section II prompted the section's commander, Cpt. George Valentin Bibescu, to reorganize its activity. To this end, four Blériots with the 80 hp engines and two Blériots with the 50 hp engines formed the No. 2 and No. 3 Reserve Squadrons.

Cpt. Nicolae Capșa and Ioan H. Arion took off on 8 August 1913, at 6.05 a.m., with orders to drop leaflets over Sofia. The pilot noting:

...The machine climbed slowly to 1,200 m (3,900 ft)... Turning east, we climbed following the road to Sofia and the village of Zeljava we observed troops camped in 140 small forts. At 7.30 a.m. we were above Sofia at 1,200 m (3,900 ft) and passing over the Royal Palace, where Arion released more manifestos. We turned over the Metropolitan Cathedral and, about 5 km (3.1 mi) from the city, we saw a fort with two cupolas near the road to Filipopol. On return, captain Arion took more stereoscopic views. At 8.10 we landed at Orhanie. Total 150 km (93 mi) in 2 hours and 5 minutes of flight time.

The Romanian airmen continued to fly reconnaissance missions during the war. On 14 August, the Aviation was recalled to Bucharest. From the first experience of war, the ground commanders began to see the advantages of aviation, resulting in the fact that aircraft could be used very effectively in long-distance missions of over 200 km (120 mi) over the enemy lines, and in liaison missions with infantry and cavalry. Some shortcomings have also been noted. For example, only one of the five Section I Farmans flew, piloted by Slt. Gheorghe Negrescu, as the others were missing spare parts.

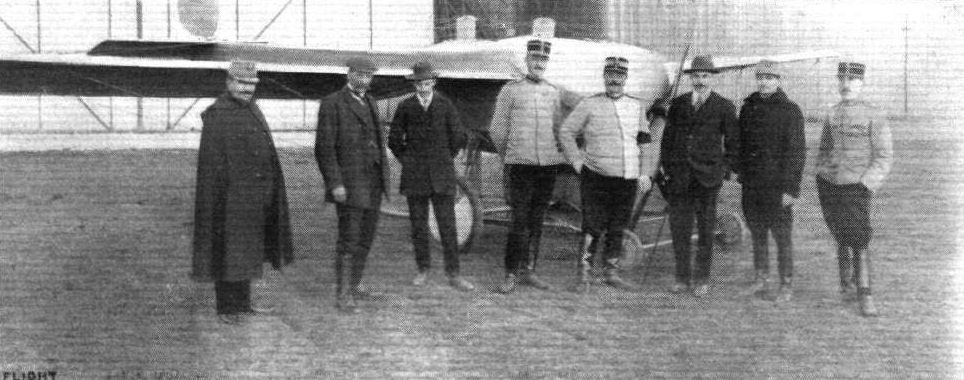
Lt. Ștefan Protopopescu (first from the right) together with Mr. C. H. Pixton and Maj. Ioan Macri (3rd and 4th from the right) in front of an 80 hp Bristol-Coandă, 1912

The year 1913 marked an important point for the Romanian aviation, with new aircraft purchases from France, Great Britain and Germany. At the end of the year the aviation had 20 licensed pilots and was equipped with 34 aircraft, as follows:

- Military aircraft: 3 Bristol-Coanda Monoplanes with 50 hp engines; 7 Bristol T.B.8 with 80 hp engines; (Note: These were converted from Bristol-Coandă monoplanes.) 4 Farman HF.20; 1 Rumpler Taube with a 100 hp Mercedes engine; 1 twin-seat "Nieuport" with an 80 hp engine; 1 Albatros B.I with a 100 hp engine; 8 twin-seat Blériot XI with 80 hp engines owned by Liga Națională Aeriană, which could be mobilized during war.
- School and training aircraft: 2 Bristol-Coandă "coté a coté" with 50 hp engines; 2 Bristol-Coandă without an engine; 1 Bristol B.R.7 with a 70 hp engine; 1 Farman model 1912; 2 Blériot XI with Anzani 25 hp engines (owned by Liga Națională Aeriană); 1 Nieuport IV with a 50 hp engine, flown by Mircea Zorileanu.

== World War I ==
=== Neutrality years (1914–1916) ===
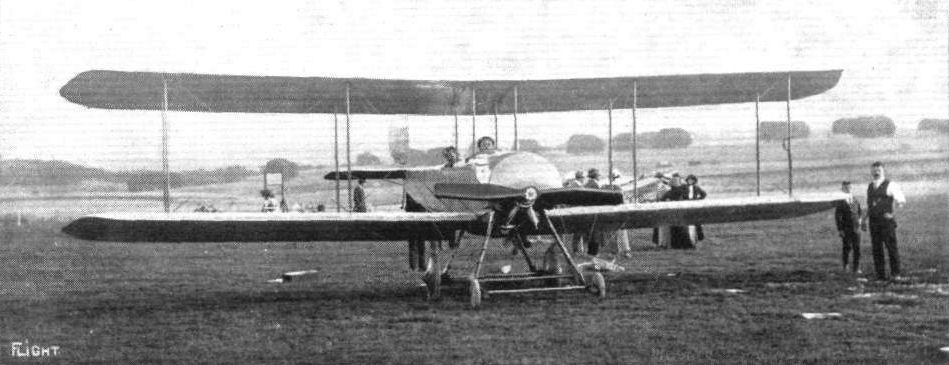
A Bristol Tractor Biplane 8 (T.B.8)

In 1914, 18 students enrolled for pilot training (eight officer cadets and eight non-commissioned officers). The Băneasa Flight School had another 10 students (five officers and five junior officers). With the international situation becoming more and more tense, through Order no. 421/1914, the Ministry of War tasked the command of the Aviation with survey missions in the country, especially around Craiova, Turnu Măgurele, Mărășești, Pașcani and Medgidia with the goal of setting up fuel depots in case of mobilization, as well as for the identification of fields where reserve aerodromes could be set up. Through continued propaganda in the support of equipping the aviation with flying machines, the residents of Turnu Severin gathered funds and bought a Bristol T.B.8, the same was done by the residents of Silistra and Iași.

Visiting Romania in the summer, Tsar Nicholas II of Russia enjoyed a special welcome. While the Imperial ship was 20 km (12 mi) from the Romanian coast, two flights, one of Bristol-Coandă airplanes and another of Blériots, flew out to the Black Sea over the Imperial ship. The Romanian pilots simulated an aerial battle at an altitude of 1,500 m (4,900 ft), executing dives and loops and impressing the Tsar.

After the outbreak of the war, the Crown Council invoked by Carol I chose neutrality for Romania. Soon after this decision, King Carol I died and was succeeded by Ferdinand I to the throne. During the neutrality period, Romania invested in reorganizing, equipping and training its armed forces, allocating 17-22% of the country’s budget for defense. However, the money spent for defense was insufficient to acquire all the necessary equipment to modernize the entire military. Although Romania had the facilities to manufacture Farman and Bristol-Coandă airplanes under French and British license, the Ministry of War preferred to import airplanes.

Military pilots continued their training for participation in an eventual military campaign. The Romanian airmen believed that politicians did not understand the role of military aviation in setting policies. Therefore, between 1914 and 1916, some enthusiastic pilots along with some experts from the Army Arsenal decided to experiment with dropping Romanian-designed bombs and practiced attacking ground targets from the air. On 12 January 1915 the first launching of a Romanian-made bomb from a height of 800 m (2,600 ft) took place. Two kinds of bombs were tested: one of 10 kg (22 lb) and the other of 5.5 kg (12 lb), with the latter being rated as the best one to be launched by hand. At the end of July 1915, the Aviation had 34 aircraft.

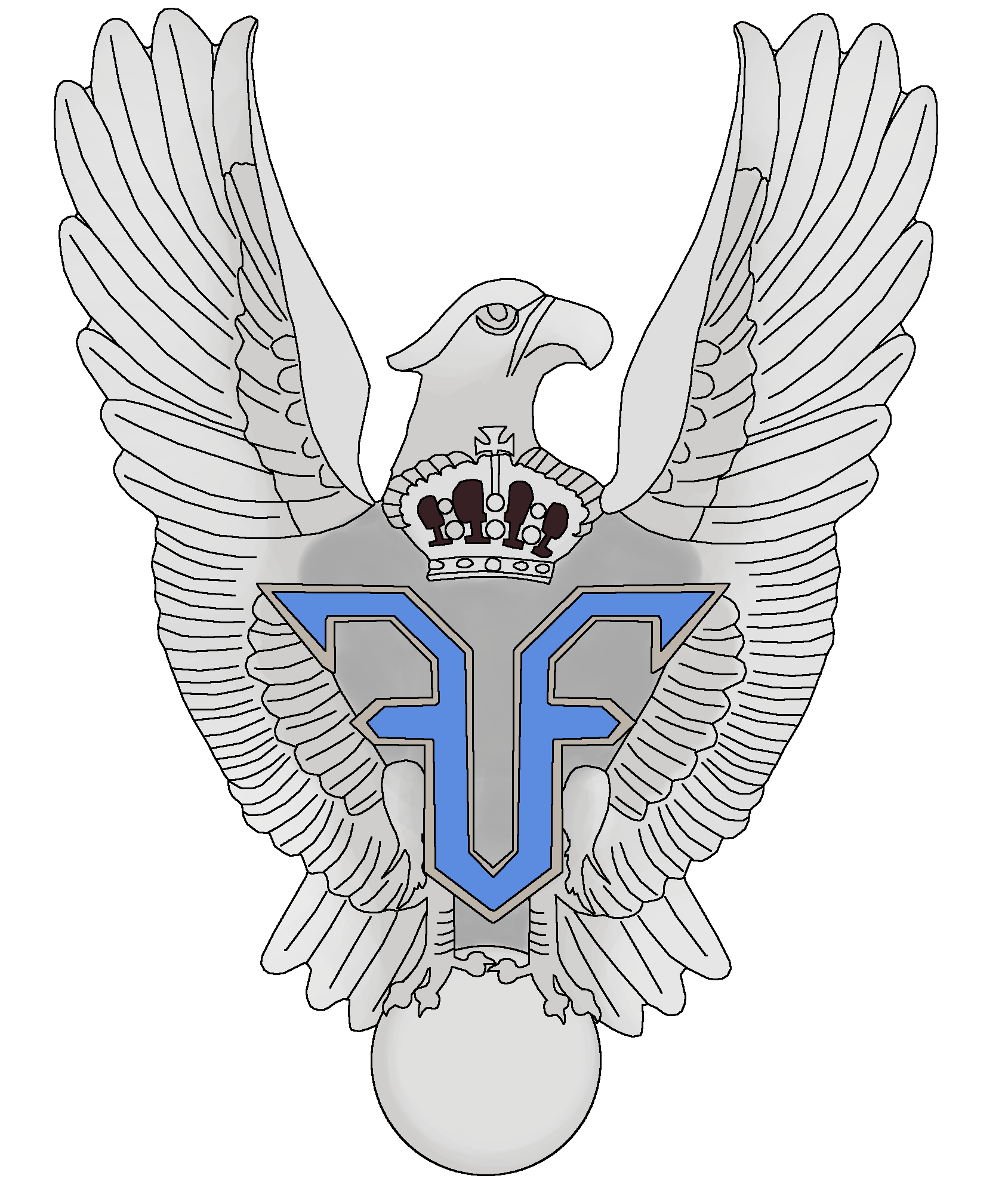
Romanian model 1915 pilot badge, featuring the "Royal Eagle" (Pajura Regală) and the cipher of King Ferdinand

New Romanian aviator badges for pilots and observers also appeared in 1915. For officers, the badge was of silver metal and was worn on the chest on the left side and for non-commissioned officers it was made of silk of the same color and was worn on the left sleeve. An important stage in the evolution of the Romanian military aviation was the establishment of the Romanian Air Corps on 23 August, which was put under the command of Lieutenant-Colonel (Lt. Col.) Constantin Găvănescu. Following the reorganization of the aviation, the flight school of Cotroceni was disbanded and the training of pilots and observers was taken over by the Băneasa school of the Air League. To ensure the good running of the activity, 78 military specialists were dispatched to the aerodrome. At the end of 1915, the newly independent RAC was somewhat better equipped due to the ordered airplanes arriving from France, 37 pilots and 25 observers were also licensed this year.

Continuing their training missions, the Romanian pilots were well prepared for the future conflict. Arriving at Bucharest on 4 August 1916, the French pilot Jules de Lareinthy de Tholozan noted:

The pilots performed several flights in my presence, which convinced me that they had received very good training. There is a small number of mechanics, however, they are very well trained. There is a need for more of them; the Romanian pilots have serious technical knowledge, knowing the aircraft they fly on very well... The Romanians are missing modern airplanes and spare parts. Once they will receive the first 6 Nieuport 11 fighters and 12 Farman F.40s, the strength of the RAC will increase and I am very certain that the Romanian pilots, who are very well trained, will be formidable opponents for their enemies.

=== Campaign of 1916 ===
On 28 August 1916, Romania entered the war on the side of the Entente. When the mobilization was decreed, the RAC had 44 aircraft ready. Of the 44 aircraft ordered from France, 23 were available: 8 Farman MF.7/MF.11, 5 Blériot XI, 1 Farman HF.20, 4 Voisin III/V, 4 Morane-Saulnier monoplanes, 1 Caudron G.3; an Aviatik C.I was also delivered from Germany and another 20 aircraft were available from the flight schools: (Note: Comparing the two sources gives the following numbers.) 10 Bristol T.B.8, 7 Bristol Coanda Monoplanes, 3 Farman HF.20. All aircraft were initially unarmed, the machine guns for the airplanes started to arrive only from September 1916.

At the beginning of the campaign, the RAC was organized as such:

- Grupul 1 Escadrile (1st Squadron Group) - The group had 2 squadrons.
- Grupul 2 Escadrile - assigned to the Romanian 2nd Army.
- Grupul 3 Escadrile - assigned to the Romanian 3rd Army. The group had 3 squadrons: Escadrila "București", Escadrila "Alexandria" and Escadrila "Budești".
- Grupul 4 Escadrile - assigned to the Northern Army.
- The RAC also had 4 balloon sections, each with 1 Drachen captive balloon.

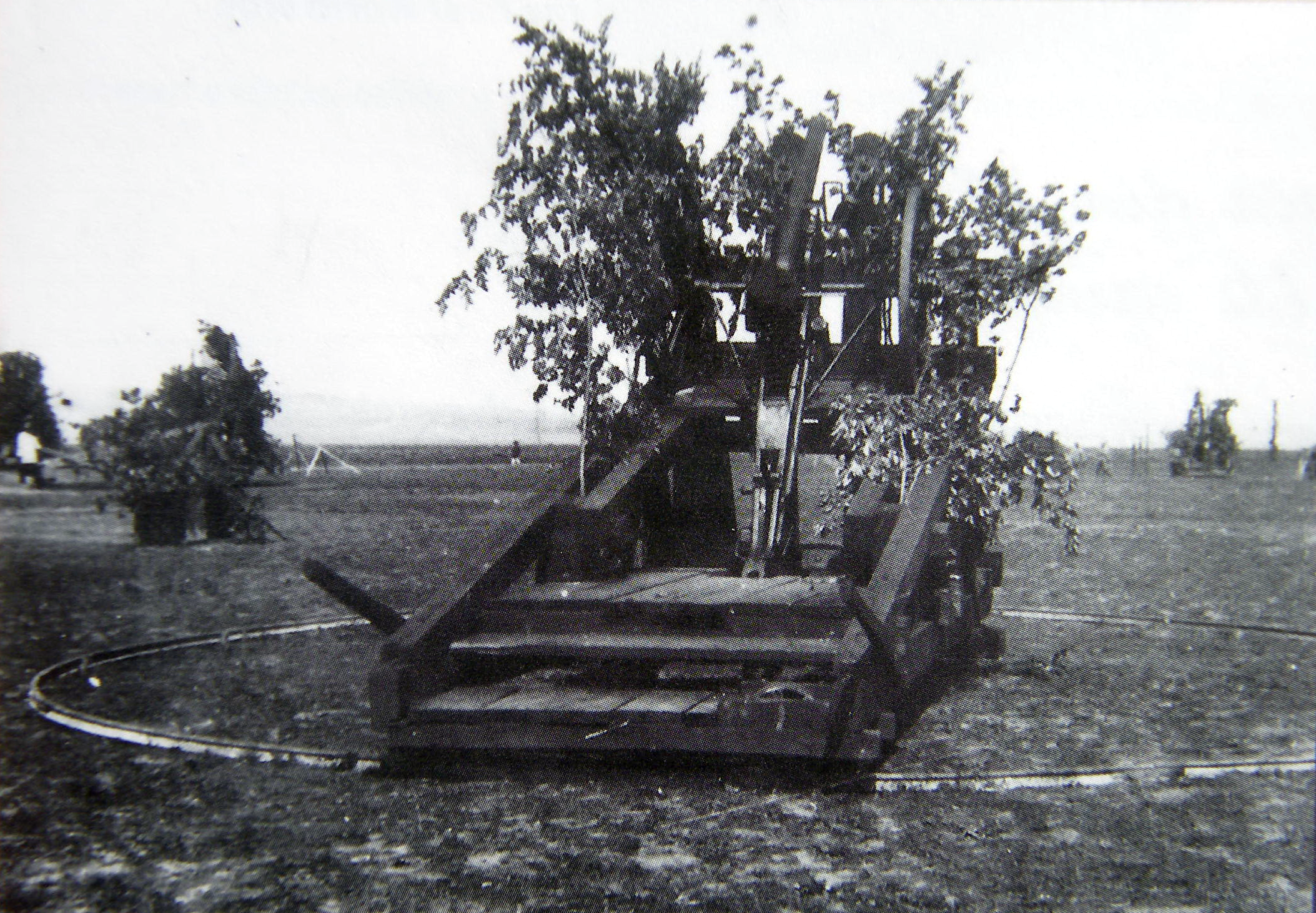
57 mm "Negrei" anti-aircraft gun system

The Central Powers deployed 22 German and Austro-Hungarian squadrons on the Romanian Front, totaling over 250 aircraft. They also deployed 20 balloon companies (10 Austro-Hungarian, 8 German and 2 Bulgarian), as well as 4 Zeppelins (LZ 81, LZ 86, LZ 97 and LZ 101). On 15 August, the Romanian Anti-aircraft Defence Corps was established, with the mission to protect the important civil and military objectives against enemy aerial attacks. The Corps had 113 anti-aircraft guns, including "Negrei" and "Burileanu" gun systems, some machine guns and searchlights. Bucharest was protected by the Anti-aircraft Defence Branch of the Capital City, which was equipped with twenty 75 mm guns adapted for anti-aircraft use, two "Negrei" system 57 mm guns, 16 anti-aircraft machine guns and 8 sections of 60 and 90 cm searchlights.

At the beginning of the campaign, the Romanian Air Corps carried out surveillance and photographic reconnaissance missions to support the land forces. In the southern theater of operations, Romanian airplanes discovered German, Turkish and Bulgarian troop movements and informed the commanders of the 3rd Army, via thrown messages. This helped to prevent the troops from Dobrudja and the forces deployed south of the Danube River from being surrounded. On the front in Transylvania, Grupul 1 Escadrile executed the first reconnaissance missions. On 16 September, a German aircraft that was flying over Călărași was intercepted by the Farman F.40 of Lt. Panait Cholet and observer Ioan Gruia. Using the onboard Hotchkiss 8 mm machine gun, Gruia damaged the enemy airplane which crash-landed near Silistra. This was the first Romanian air victory of the war.

In order to improve the support for the land forces, the airmen decided to extend their missions by dropping bombs on enemy targets by hand in the absence of proper bomb dropping equipment. They threw 10 kg (22 lb) and 12 kg (26 lb) Romanian-designed "Drosescu" bombs against enemy troop concentrations at Lepnic and Gogolia, against the Svishtov railroad station and the fuel depot in Rusciuk, on the Southern front. Troops and command centers at field army and army corps level, along the Northern front, were also targeted.

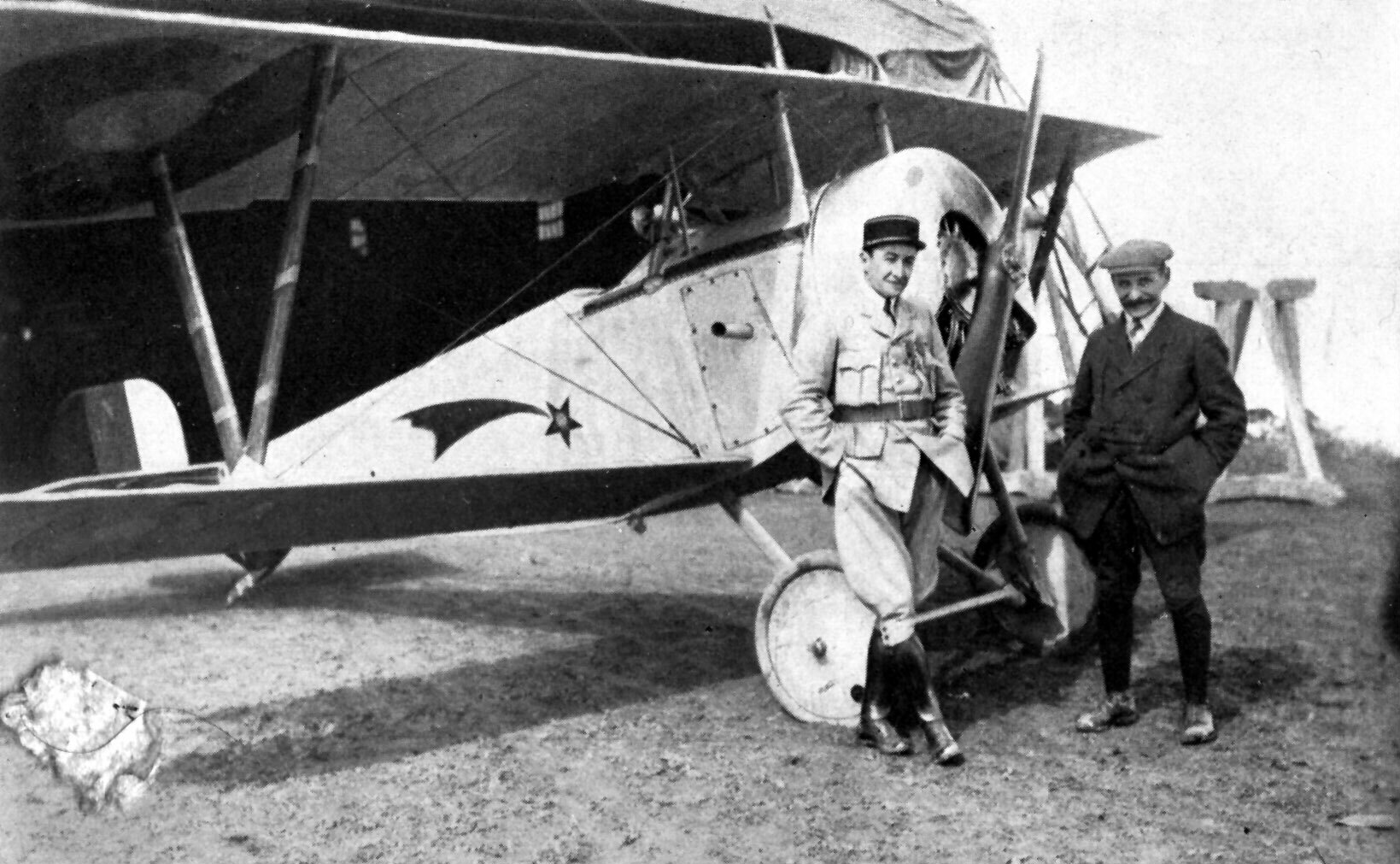
Bert Hall also served with the French Military Mission in Romania in early 1917, claiming he shot down a German airplane over the Danube, close to Galați.

At the beginning of October, the French Military Mission, led by General Henri Mathias Berthelot, arrived in Romania. The Mission was composed of 500 commissioned officers and 1150 non-commissioned officers, corporals, soldiers and civilians with different specialties. The aviation component consisted of 42 commissioned officers, 45 non-commissioned officers, 36 corporals and 162 soldiers and civilians (pilots, aerial observers, specialists in balloons, communications and wireless telegraphy, etc.). The Mission’s main aim was to transfer France’s knowledge and experience to its Romanian allies. The French worked to improve command and organizational structure, equipment and the training level of both leaders and combat personnel. In order to meet the objective, the members of the Mission became directly involved and assumed command positions. In this regard, Major De Malherbe was appointed as Commander of the military aviation through Order no. 11/17 October 1916, and Major Gheorghe Rujinschi, the RAC’s Commander, became his deputy.

Between 1 August 1916 and 1 January 1917, the RAC received, following some procurement contracts, 152 aircraft: 11 Bréguet 5 and 12 Bréguet-Michelin equipped with 37 mm cannons, 10 Caudron G.4, 18 Nieuport 11, 10 Nieuport 21 and 91 Farman F.40. Aside from the airplanes, Romania also purchased various equipment for reconnaissance and bomber aircraft, as well as a few thousands of "Gros" and "Michelin" type bombs and Le Prieur rockets.

On 25 October 1916, 6 aircraft (including Farman HF 27 and Nieuport 12s) of RNAS Wing 2 arrived in Romania from Imbros as part of the Romanian Flight mission. Another 3 aircraft arrived on 21 November. The airplanes were part of the contract signed by the Romanian representatives with their British counterparts. The British trained the Romanian pilots until January 1917, when they left the country.

==== Bombing raids ====
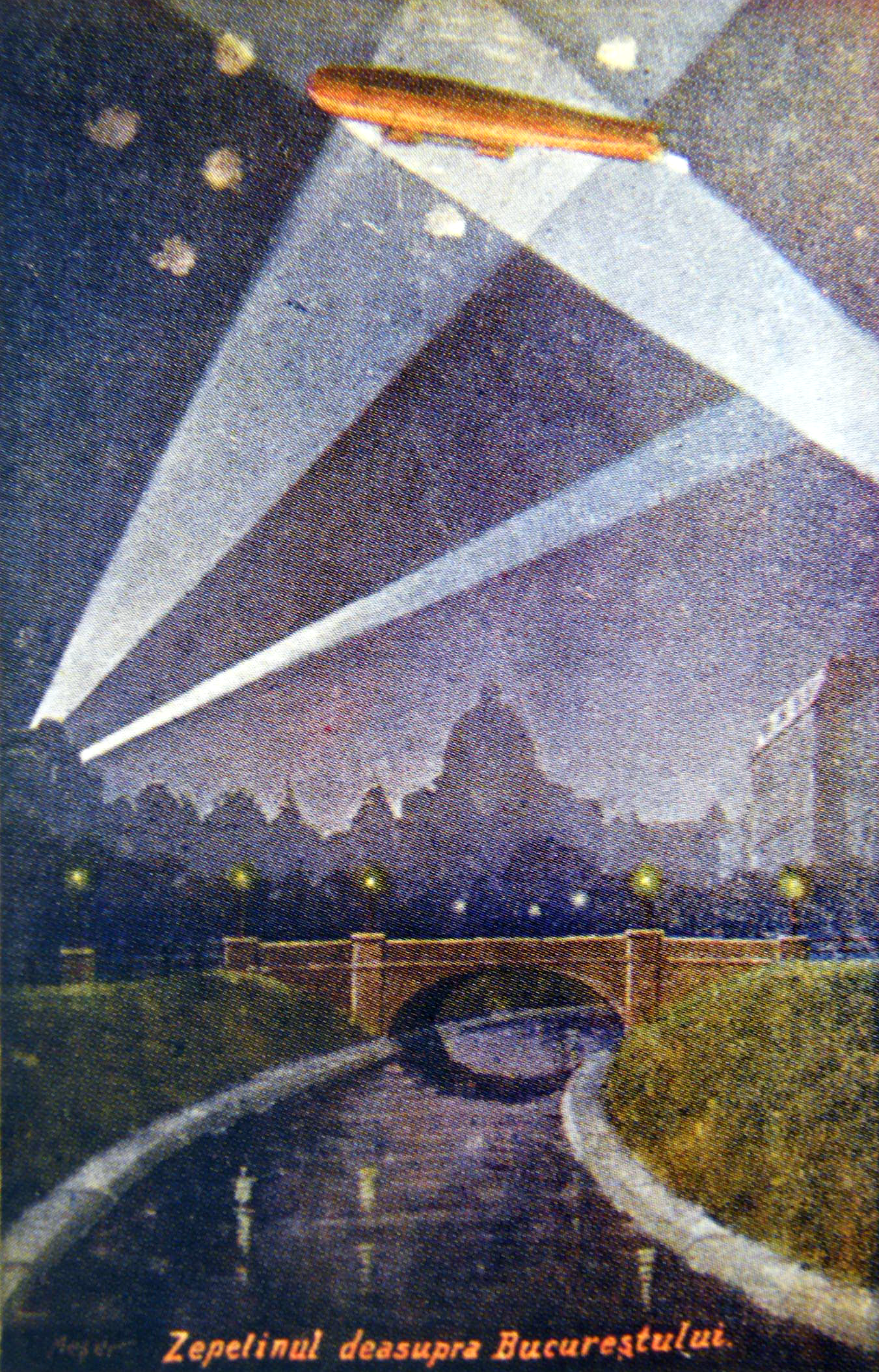
Zeppelin over Bucharest

A few hours after Romania's declaration of war, Hauptmann Geissert (commander of zeppelin LZ 101, stationed at Yambol, Bulgaria) received the order to bomb Bucharest. The zeppelins carried out raids on Bucharest, as well as on the oil refineries of Ploiești. On 4/5 September, while on a bombing raid over Ploiești, LZ 86 was hit by Romanian artillery, which damaged one of its gondolas. The zeppelin tried to return to the base in Timișoara but while on the way, the damaged gondola detached, causing the ship to become unbalanced. The airship crashed near Utvin, killing nine of its crewmen, including the commander. Another zeppelin, LZ 81, would also be damaged by anti-aircraft fire while over Bucharest on 26/27 September. The airship crash-landed near Tarnovo while trying to return to base.

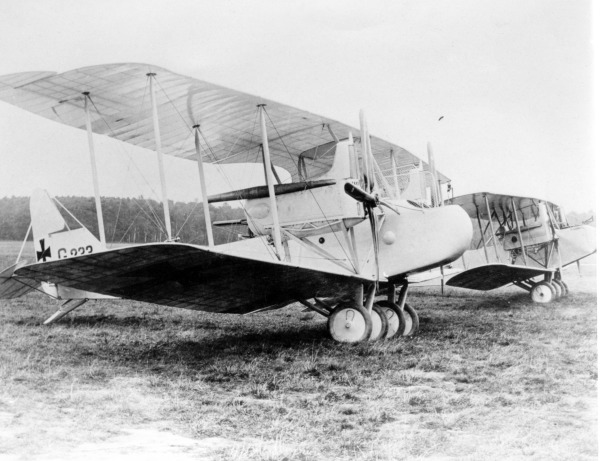
AEG G.IIIs were used by Kampfgeschwader 1 (Kagohl 1), which was stationed at Razgrad

The German bombers stationed in northern Bulgaria also carried out raids in Romania. The port of Constanța was a regular target for the bombers. Another priority target was the railroad bridge at Cernavodă. The initial raids against Cernavodă were ineffective, owing to the light weight of the bombs used. Better results were obtained once the bombers began receiving 100 lb (45 kg) bombs. Aircraft were used to attack enemy assembly areas and bivouacs, as well as munitions dumps.

On 2 December, a Romanian aircraft flown by the French Lt. De Maille and by Lt. Eugeniu Iorgulescu executed a raid on Sofia. The raid was meant as a reply to the bombings of Bucharest. The Romanian crew dropped three 16 kg (35 lb) "Drosescu" bombs over the Royal Palace, which was hit and caught fire. The anti-aircraft artillery around the city managed to hit the airplane which was forced to land, the crew being taken prisoner.

At the end of the year, General Constantin Prezan, the new Chief of the M.C.G., advised by the Chief of the French Military Mission, decided to reorganize the Air Corps. A new Aeronautical Directorate was created, commanded by Lt. Col. François de Vergnette de Lamotte of the French Mission. The task of the director of Aeronautics was to ensure the cooperation between the operations and the information bureaus and to centralize the information obtained during various missions. The RAC was composed of aviation, balloon, photo, meteorology, and training branches. The Commander of the Aviation Branch was Maj. Constantin Fotescu, while the Balloon Branch was commanded by Maj. Ion Iarca. With the new organization, 3 Aeronautical Groups, commanded by Romanian officers were created. However, some of the squadrons of these groups were led by French officers. Each group was assigned to an army and generally had 3 squadrons (2 reconnaissance and 1 fighter).

Following the quick advance of the Central Powers, it was decided to move the flight school to Bârlad on 27 September. On 15 December, an order to move to Botoșani was received. In June 1917, the school was moved again, with the pilot school moving to Odessa and the observer school to Vaslui.

By the end of the campaign, the RAC lost 12 aircraft, and 12 pilots in combat, with another 2 pilots killed in training flights. The numbers of other aircrewmen lost is unknown. The Romanians shot down 5 aircraft in aerial combat, 3 aircraft were shot down by the French airmen and another 23 by the anti-aircraft artillery.

=== Campaign of 1917 ===
The Romanian front line in early February 1917

On 1 January 1917 the Romanian Air Corps had 58 pilots and 12 observers, another 20 pilots and 18 observers were in training. A number of 53 aircraft were available while others were being assembled or repaired at the workshops of Rezerva generală a aviației (RGA), which were the former workshops from Cotroceni and Băneasa that had moved to Iași in 1916. In the winter and spring of 1917, the aviation units were very active, despite the unfavorable weather conditions until the month of April.

The 3 Aeronautical Groups were organized as such:

- Grupul 1 Aeronautic Bacău, assigned to the 2nd Romanian Army:
  - Escadrila F.2
  - Escadrila F.6
  - Escadrila N.1
- Grupul 2 Aeronautic Tecuci, assigned to the 4th Russian Army (will be re-assigned to the 1st Romanian Army):
  - Escadrila F.4
  - Escadrila F.7
  - Escadrila N.3
  From the beginning of the summer of 1917, 2 new squadrons were created for the group:
  - Escadrila F.9
  - Escadrila N.11
  - Escadrila C.12 was also assigned to this group
- Grupul 3 Aeronautic Galați, assigned to the 1st Romanian Army (will be re-assigned to the 6th Russian Army):
  - Escadrila F.5
  - Escadrila N.10
  - Escadrila B.M.8
- The RAC also had 5 balloon companies, equipped with Drachen and Caquot kite balloons.

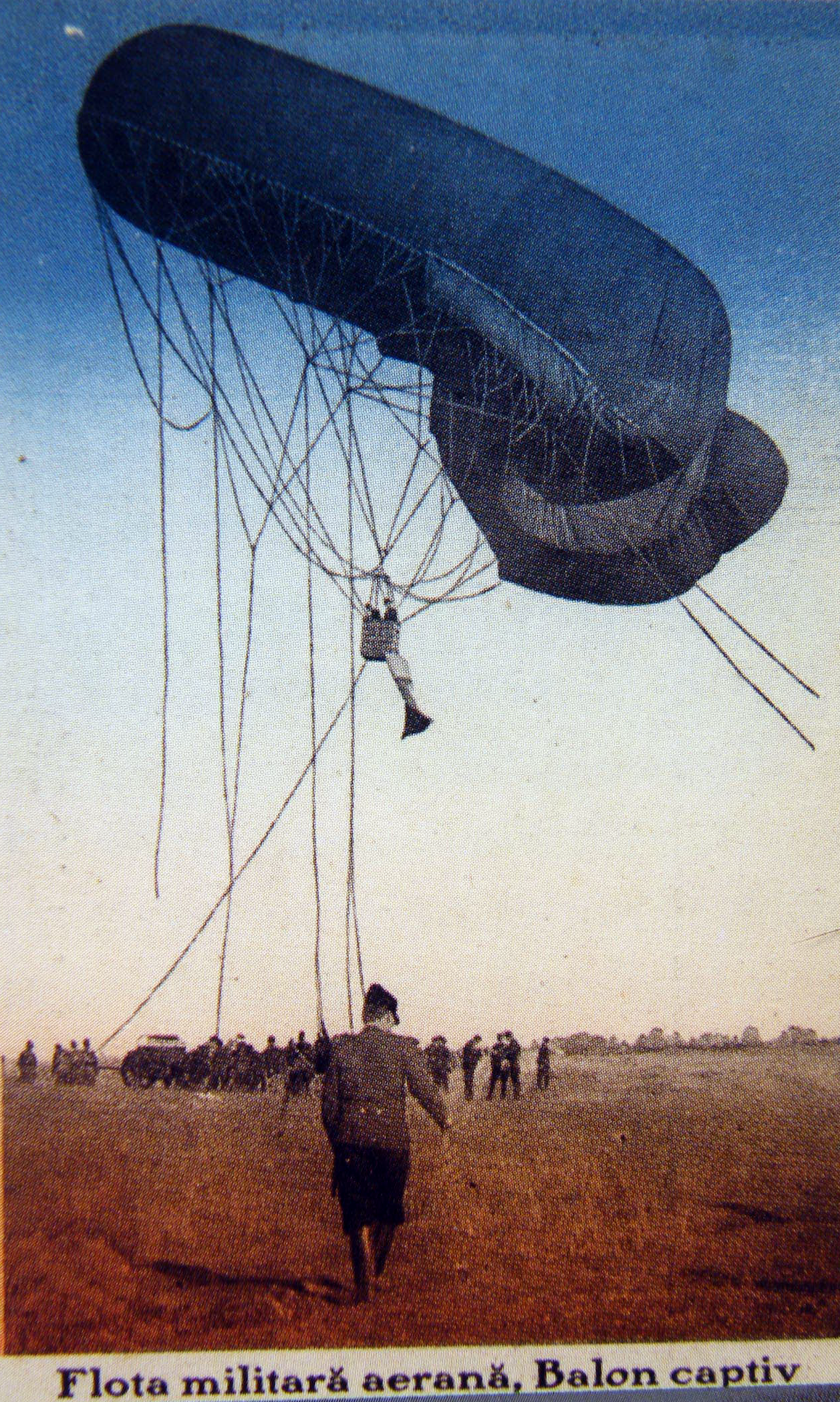
Romanian Drachen captive balloon on the front in Moldavia, 1917

From February, the Romanian and French specialists of the 2nd Aeronautical Group were able to intercept and decrypt the German radio messages, which contributed to completing the commanders’ big picture of the enemy’s strength, deployments and intentions obtained through surveillance and photography. In parallel with reconnaissance and combat missions, the aviation bombed enemy military and transport facilities. One of the most important bombing missions was done by the 3rd Aeronautical Group on 31 March, with 19 aircraft. The Romanian and French crews destroyed the railroad, docks and facilities from the Port of Brăila and sank two German military ships. From May onwards, the aviation started night bombings using Farman F.40 and Bréguet bombers against important enemy targets: the Port of Brăila; Brașov’s plants; the airfields at Focșani, Covasna, Miercurea-Ciuc and Târgu Secuiesc; the Buzău-Râmnicu Sărat-Focșani and Buzău-Făurei-Ianca-Brăila railroads and railway stations.

On 25 May, two Bréguet bombers, escorted by a third Bréguet, armed with a 37 mm (1.5 in) cannon took off with the mission to bomb the Traian railway station. After dropping their bombs, the bombers were attacked by enemy fighters. The escorting airplane opened fire with its cannon, hitting one of the opposing aircraft with shrapnel. The enemy pilot barely managed to regain control and avoided hitting the ground. Hearing the noise of the battle, Lt. Vasile Craiu and Plutonier (Sergeant First Class) Marin Popescu, who were patrolling in the area, joined in the fighting and drove the enemy fighters away, Craiu managing to damage one of them.

Reconnaissance and bombing missions continued through the month of June. The first artillery salvos of the Romanian 4th Army Corps in the morning of 22 July marked the beginning of the summer offensive. By this point, the RAC had 80–90 aircraft available, approximately 150 pilots (of which 42 were French) and 84 observers. During the first three days of battle, the Romanian and French airmen carried out some 130 missions, including those of directing friendly artillery fire, with the airmen of the F.5 Squadron directing the Russian heavy artillery fire. All 12 squadrons of the Aeronautical groups participated in the offensive at Mărăști.

From 6 August, the Central Powers began their offensive, the beginning of the Battle of Mărășești. The front of the 1st Romanian army was divided into three sectors, after the number of reconnaissance squadrons. From early morning until nightfall, three Farman F.40s, one for each sector, kept watch for any enemy troop movement. No aircraft left the front area until its replacement arrived after three hours. The front was protected by the fighters of the Nieuport squadrons so that the whole front line of the 1st Army was defended by the aviation.

The aviators of the F.7 and F.9 squadrons carried out flights over the enemy positions, observer Constantin Nicolau from Escadrila F.7 noting:

Starting from the first lines of trenches down to the bottom where the 3rd line of enemy resistance should have been, disappearing under the plumes of smoke clouds, all that could constitute the area of a known objective was being picked apart by shell explosions of our artillery, light and heavy. And likewise, our positions, beginning with the first lines of trenches and battery emplacements identified by the enemy, were being pounded by enemy artillery with almost equal intensity to our own.

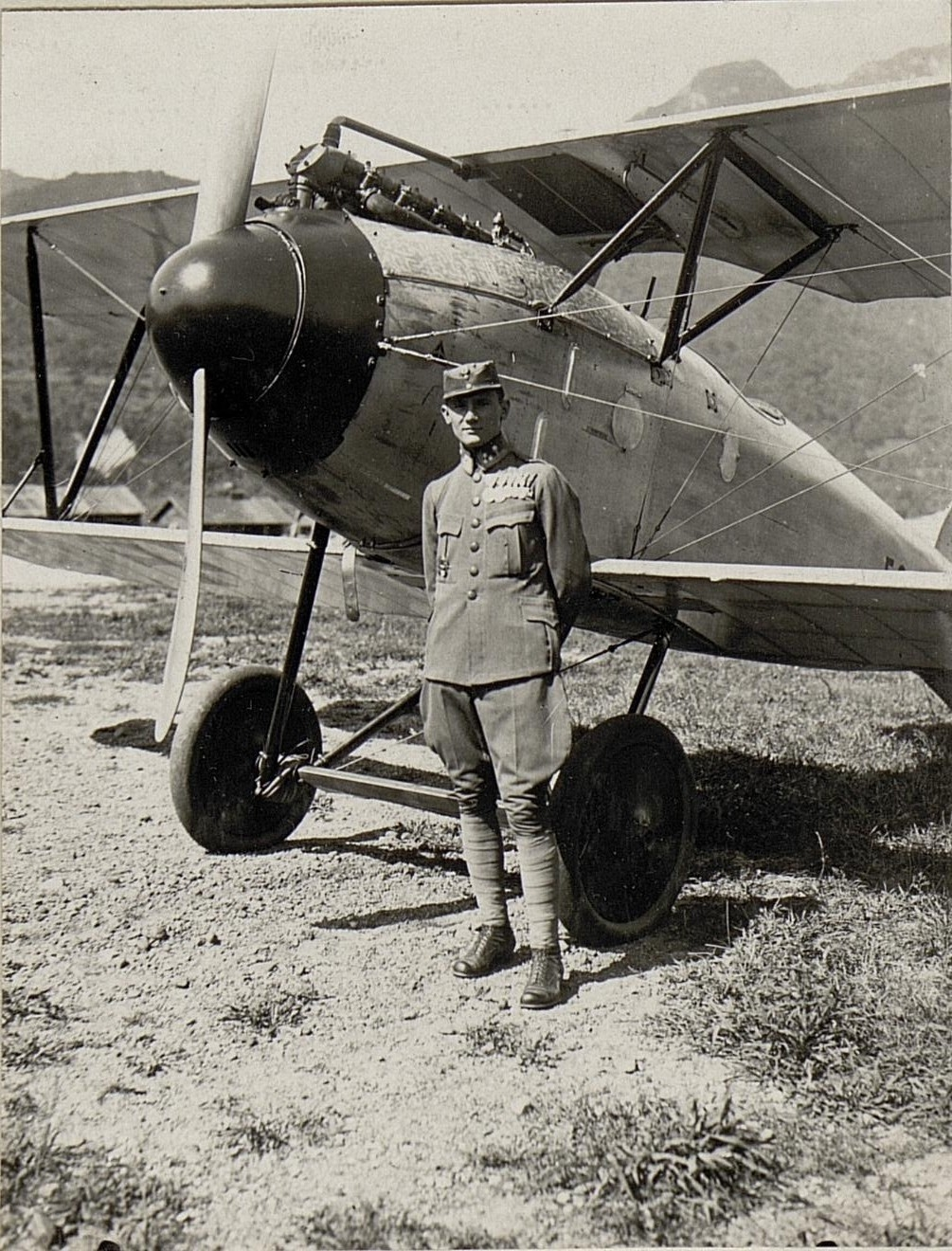
Oeffag-built Albatros D.IIIs were used by Fliegerdetachement Nikitsch.

In the sectors where the damage done by the Romanian artillery was incomplete, the aviators of F.4 Squadron would carry out bombing missions. The pilots of the N.11 and N.3 squadrons ensured the protection of the front line by engaging enemy aircraft, dogfights happening almost daily, with the aviators of Escadrila N.11 obtaining important victories, for example, Egon Nasta shot down a captive balloon using Le Prieur rockets. The numerous aerial battles and losses caused the Austro-Hungarian High Command to create new dedicated fighter units on the Romanian front. For this, Fliegerdetachement Nikitsch (later re-named to Kampfstaffel or Jagdstaffel Harja) was created and assigned to Fliegerkompanie 31. The unit's commander, Hauptmann Karl Nikitsch, requested more modern fighters as "many dogfights are carried out on the Romanian front, the losses in men and material are heavy".

In the morning of 19 August, the enemy troops launched an attack aided by a 3-hour artillery barrage, including the use of gas shells over the 3 Romanian divisions. The German infantry managed to occupy the south-west part of Mărășești. The enemy troops were attacked by the aircraft of the F.7 and F.9 squadrons which carried out 14 bombing missions that day. At the same time, the observers directed the fire of the Romanian and Russian heavy artillery batteries, noting: "The shells hit the enemy trenches of the first line with great precision. The first enemy line at Găvanul was completely destroyed, and at Cota 114 a lot of green smoke could be seen." On that day, the crews of the 2nd Aeronautical Group flew on 35 missions, totaling 88 flight hours.

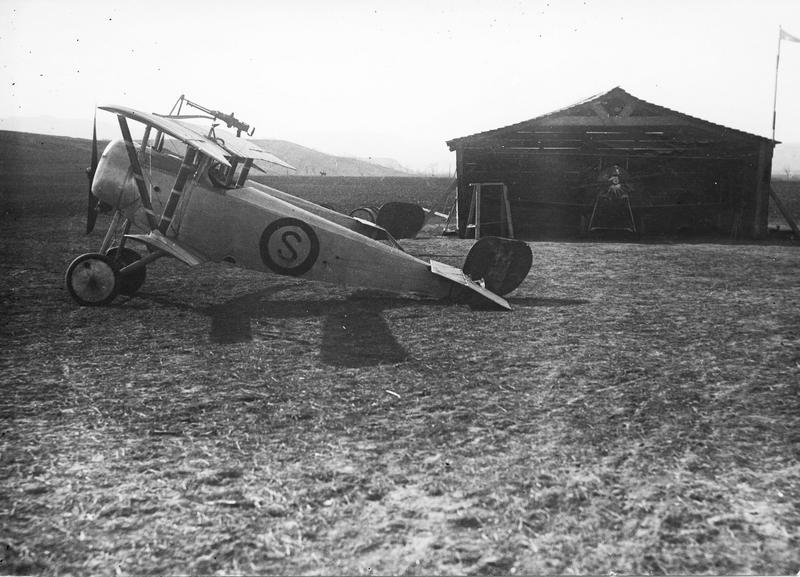
Romanian Nieuport fighters of Grupul 1 Aeronautic, 1917

The use of the RAC squadrons at the Battles of Mărăști and Mărășești supported the 1st and 2nd Romanian Armies and allowed those commanders to make informed decisions during the battles. The contributions of the RAC during the summer campaign of 1917 were also noted by General Kurt von Morgen. During the month of August, the Romanian forces scored 32 victories, including those scored by the anti-aircraft artillery, with the French aviators obtaining a further 6 victories.

After the conclusion of the summer military operations, the aviation continued their missions with the same intensity. From 22 September, Grupul 3 Aeronautic with Escadrila F.7 and Escadrila N.10 were transferred to Botoșani. At the start of October, two aircraft from Escadrila F.5 were sent to Ismail, at the request of Gen. Dmitry Shcherbachev. The aircraft were tasked with defending southern Bessarabia and managed the shoot down one German aircraft in the Bolgrad region. On 7 November 1917, Romanian aviators scored 5 air victories through Egon Nasta, Paul Magâlea and Ion Muntenescu, all pilots of Escadrila N.11 and through the crew of Dumitru Crăsnaru and Alexandru Vasilescu from Escadrila F.9.

The Romanian and French aviators continued their missions until 9 December, when the Romanian Government had to sign an armistice with the Central Powers, following Russia's ceasefire agreements. Romania would eventually be forced to sign a peace treaty on 7 May 1918.

=== Campaign of 1918 ===
From January 1918, the Aeronautical Groups were organized as given:

- Grupul 1 Aeronautic Bacău:
  - Escadrila F.6 - renamed to Escadrila S.6 after receiving Sopwith 1½ Strutters
  - Escadrila F.2
  - Escadrila N.1
  All squadrons of this group were based at Bacău.
- Grupul 2 Aeronautic Tecuci:
  - Escadrila F.5
  - Escadrila S.8 - ex-B.M.8
  - Escadrila N.11
  - Escadrila N.3
- Grupul 3 Aeronautic Roman:
  - Escadrila F.9
  - Escadrila S.12 - ex-C.12
  - Escadrila N.10

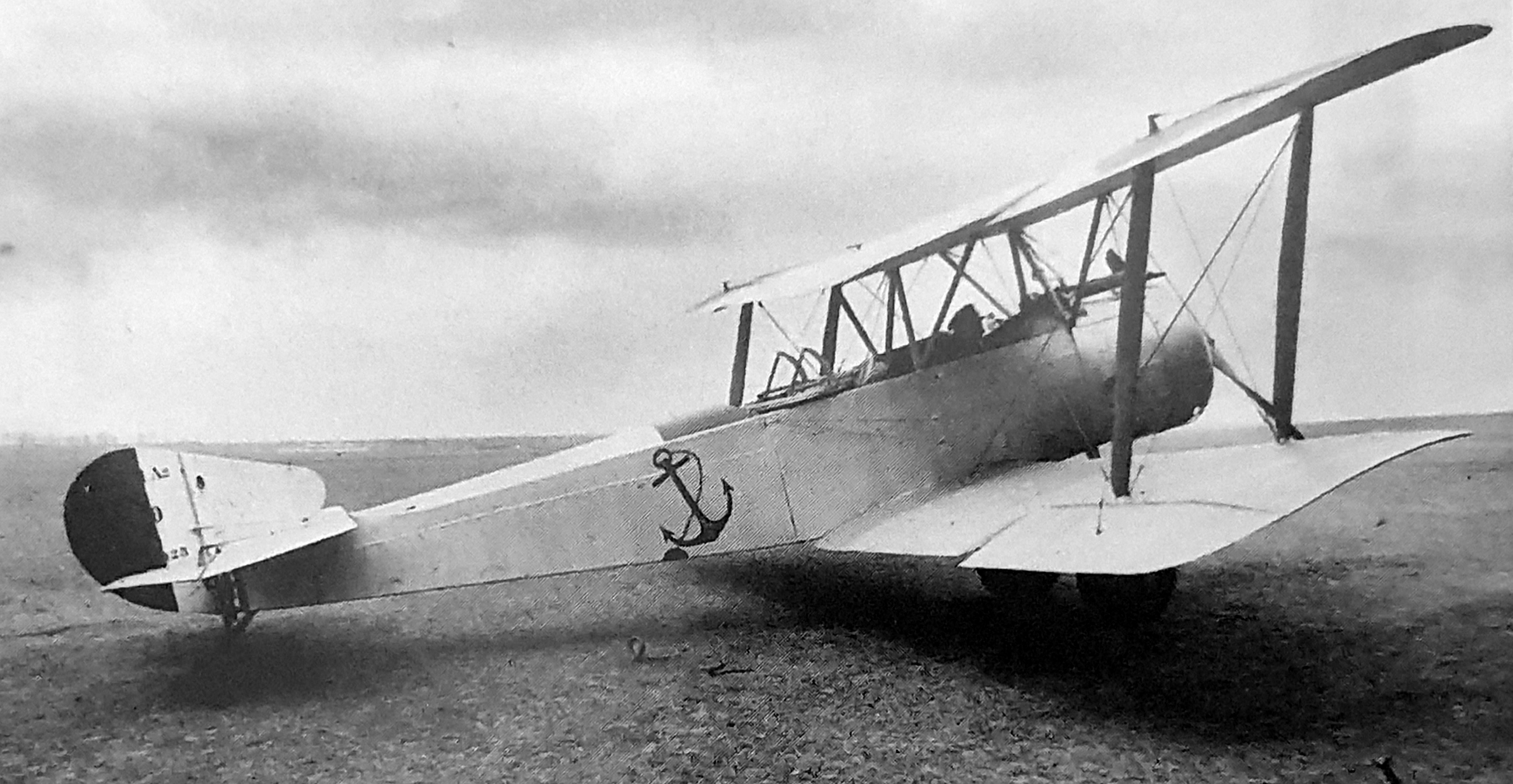
A Romanian Sopwith 1½ Strutter.

On 11 February, the RAC had 78 aircraft available, as follows: 18 Nieuports, 16 Nieuport 11, 14 Sopwiths, 26 Farmans, 1 Maurice Farman, 2 Caudron G.4 and 1 Morane-Saulnier.

The entry of Romanian troops into Bessarabia to drive out the Bolshevik troops, prompted the Romanian M.C.G. to send two squadrons, Escadrila F.4 and Escadrila N.3bis, to the theater of operations. These squadrons would form Grupul Aeronautic basarabean and would support the Romanian troops of the 6th Army Corps in the Bessarabian campaign. The first air missions were executed on 18 January, when three Russian SPAD VIIs flew over Galați, reaching Bârlad. Two Nieuports of N.11 Squadron went out to intercept, but could not catch the Russian airplanes.

On 6 February, the Government of Bessarabia requested Romania to provide military aid for attacks on the various bands of looting soldiers and for the protection of the railways and supply depots. The request was sent to Gen. Shcherbachev in Iași, who in turn sent it to the Romanian government. On 25 January, the first Romanian military units formed of Transylvanian volunteers entered Chișinău. On 7 February, the Romanian M.C.G. sent four divisions to Bessarabia, which were supported by the airmen of Grupul Aeronautic basarabean.

At the request of the 3rd Army Corps, the S.6 Squadron moved to Chilia to carry out missions in the area. Thus, aerial reconnaissance at the mouths of the Danube established that the Bolshevik ships were in the Ochakov channel east of Vâlcov. In Bessarabia, the air missions carried out by the F.4 Squadron, protected by Nieuport fighters of the N.3 Squadron, targeted the front sector of Tiraspol-Grigoriopol-Dniester river. On 29 February, the French Military Mission left the country. On 3 March, while on a mission in the Tiraspol-Glinajia sector, a Romanian reconnaissance aircraft was damaged and forced to land by Bolshevik soldiers while over Slobozia.

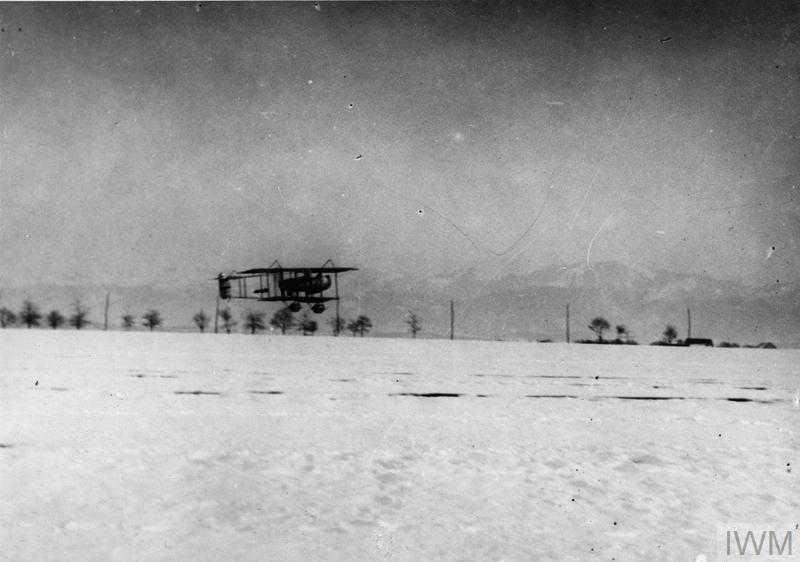
The Farman flown by Niculescu and Precup taking off from Mărgineni, Bacău

Even after the Treaty of Bucharest, relations with the French were kept for the rest of the war. To this end, on 22 October, French aviator Louis Noël flew a Bréguet 14 from Salonica to Iași transporting the Romanian minister Victor Antonescu, who informed the government about the evolution of the war and about the intent for an eventual re-mobilization of the Romanian Army. For this action, Noël became a Knight of the Order of the Star of Romania and was awarded the ribbon of Virtutea Militară. On 10 November, the second mobilization of the Romanian Army began. On 23 November, Lt. Vasile Niculescu and Cpt. Victor Precup flew from Bacău to Blaj in a Farman F.40 to deliver three important documents, one of which was the letter of Ion I.C. Brătianu to the Romanian National Council. After crossing the mountains, flying at 2,500 m (8,200 ft) and in a temperature reaching −30 °C (−22 °F), the airplane landed on Câmpia Libertății to be greeted by the enthusiastic inhabitants of Blaj.

== War of 1919 ==
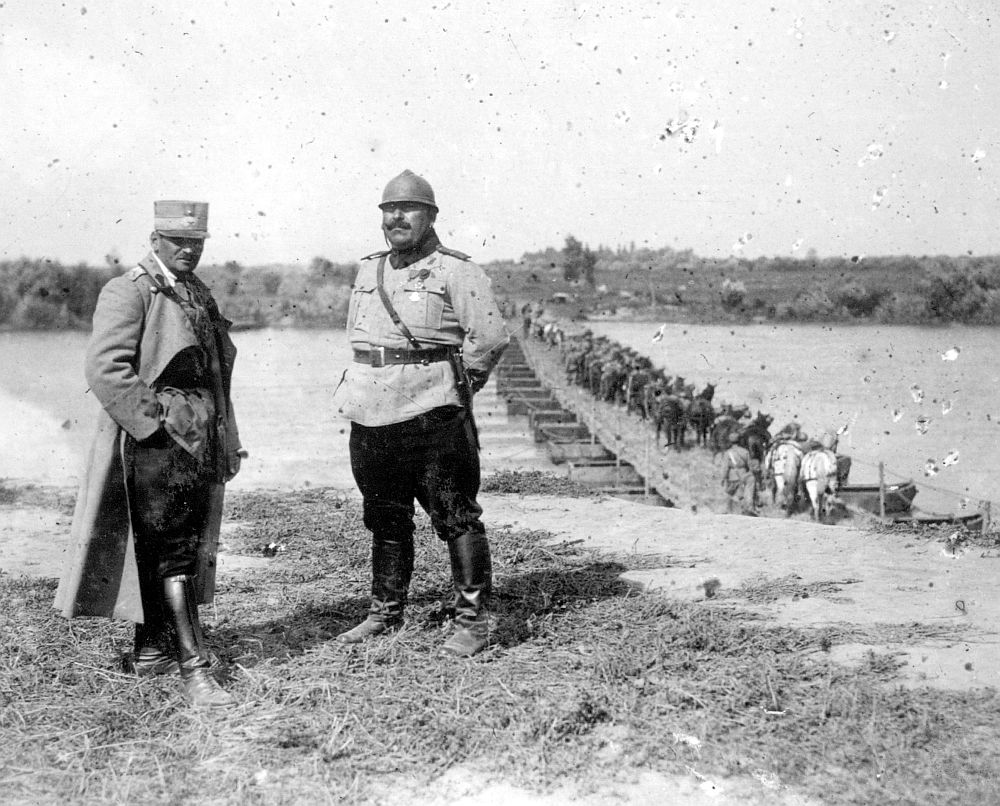
Romanian troops crossing the pontoon bridge over the Tisza river

In 1919, the Romanian Army was fighting on two fronts: in Bessarabia where Bolshevik troops were crossing the Dniester and attacking the settlements near the border, and in Hungary, where a communist regime was established on 21 March. A report from 25 March showed that Romania had 51 aircraft in service, with another SPAD VII gifted from France at the beginning of the year.

In December 1918, the 5th Aviation Group (Grupul 5 Aviație) nicknamed Grupul ardelean was formed. In March 1919, it consisted of 3 squadrons:

- Escadrila S.2 - renamed to Escadrila B.2 after receiving Bréguet 14 aircraft
- Escadrila N.7
- Escadrila S.12

These squadrons took part in the Hungarian-Romanian War. A number of Transylvanian Saxon airmen who enrolled in the RAC were also assigned to the squadrons of the 5th Aviation Group.

On the front in Bessarabia, while on a reconnaissance mission in the Moghilev area on 9 April, a Nieuport 23 flown by Slt. Ion Dragomirescu was attacked by a Bolshevik airplane. Dragomirescu, who scored 2 other victories while flying for France, quickly shot down the enemy aircraft which crashed in flames near Moghilev.

In the morning of 28 April, a LVG C.VI was intercepted and forced to land behind the Romanian lines. The aircraft was being used for flights from Budapest to Kyiv to deliver messages to the communist leaders. In the captured documents a letter was found addressed to Béla Kun, the leader of the Hungarian Soviet Republic, in which he was requested to intensify the fighting in Transylvania.

On 19 April, Lt. Nicolae Drosso and observer Lt. Aurel Constantinescu were assigned to photograph the Bolshevik positions on the left bank of the Dniester. During the mission, an enemy Anatra attacked the Romanian airmen. Constantinescu set the Anatra on fire, causing it to crash with the loss of both crewmen. This was the second aerial victory on the Bessarabian front.

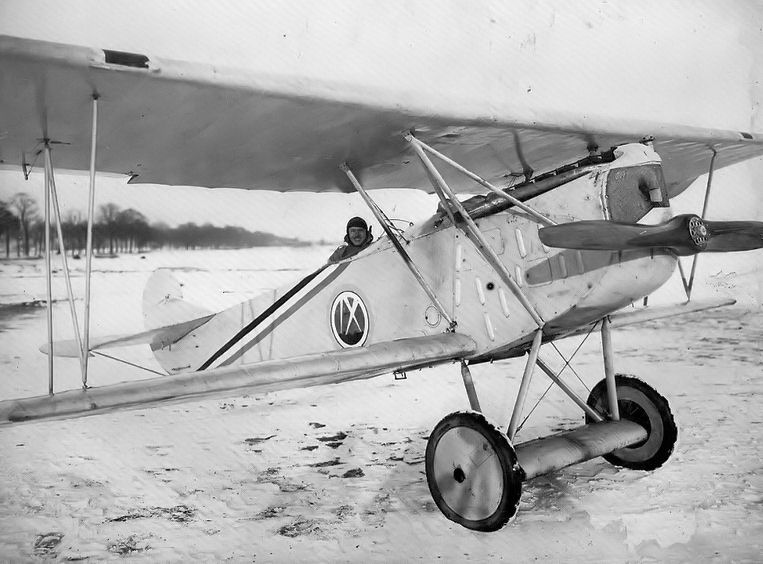
A Fokker D.VII. The Hungarian Red Air Arm used MAG-built Fokkers

The Romanian Army advanced quickly, capturing Debrecen on 23 April and reaching the Tisza River on 1 May. On 19 May, Ioan Sava and observer Ioan Vlad shot down an enemy two-seater near the village of Zagyvarékas. The Romanian aircraft became more active from the end of May, including missions such as a formation of seven Romanian aircraft bombing the railway station from Miskolc on 1 June. A captured UFAG C.I flown by Slt. Stan Bucur and Lt. Mihail Hurmuzescu was attacked and shot down by 2 Hungarian Fokker D.VIIs flown by László Újvári and Géza Keisz on 12 June while on a reconnaissance mission, both Romanian airmen losing their lives.

On 25 July, the counteroffensive of the Romanian Army began. At this time, Grupul 5 Aviație had 17 aircraft (including captured ones). Three days later, the first Romanian units crossed the Tisza, being covered by the crews of the N.7 and B.2 squadrons. On 31 July, a formation of Hungarian aircraft attacked the pontoon bridge across the river, but they were intercepted by the pilots of Escadrila N.7, with Iosif Răcășanu managing to shoot one down.

With the end of the war, a number of 150 aircraft were captured from Hungary of which 107 were complete. These included: 22 Hansa-Brandenburg C.I, 20 UFAG C.I, 11 LVG C.VI, 34 Fokker D.VII, 16 Aviatik (Berg) D.I, about 12 Hansa-Brandenburg W.29, 6 Fokker D.VI, 4 Phönix C.I and 4 Hansa-Brandenburg FB. 260 engines were also captured.

On 19 September, a Zeppelin-Staaken R.XIVa, registered DLR R.70/18 which was used by the Ukrainian Government for transport, performed an emergency landing near Cristinești. On board the airplane were the Minister of Propaganda of the Ukrainian People's Republic and his deputy, journalist Petro Benzya. The aircraft, which was badly damaged, was seized by the Romanian authorities. As the German crew refused to give any help in repairing the R.XIVa, Lt. Petre Macavei together with a team of mechanics started the repair work on their own, managing to bring the aircraft to flight readiness on the 29th of October. With Major Haralambie Giossanu as the pilot and Captain Cezar Știubei as the navigator, the airplane took off towards Bucharest. After a short stop at Adjud for refueling, the bomber landed at Pipera after a 545 km (339 mi) flight done in 4 hours and 18 minutes. The R.70 was used by the Romanians for several years to train bomber pilots.

== Victories and losses ==
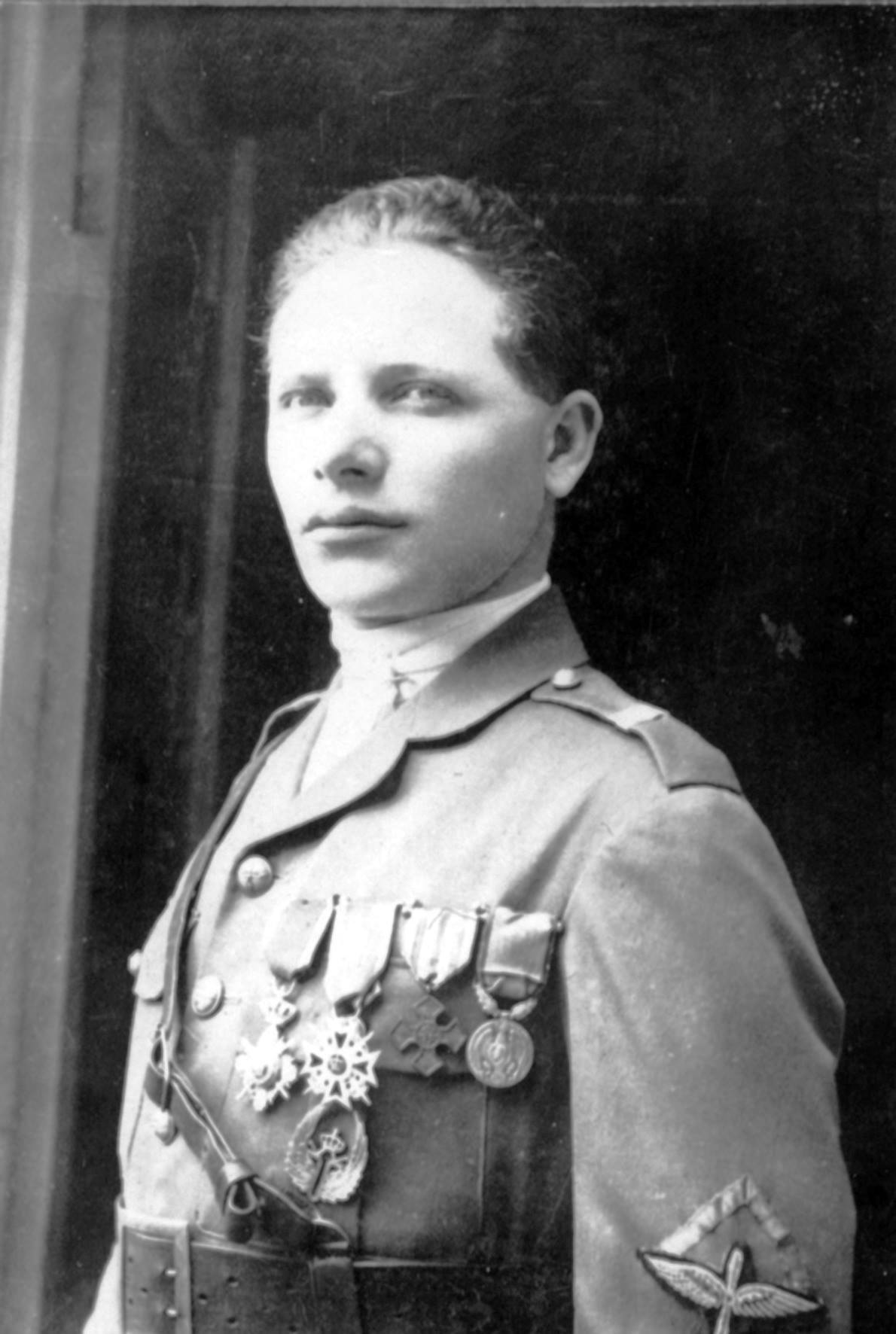
Dumitru Bădulescu was the single ace of Romania by Romanian victory standards

During the campaigns of 1916–1919, Romanian airmen achieved about 10,000 flight hours, had about 700 aerial fights and shot down some 51-91 enemy aircraft, with another 55 shot down by anti-aircraft artillery. Twenty-two Romanian pilots and six air observers were killed in air combat and nine more were shot down by enemy anti-aircraft artillery. Twenty pilots, air observers and technical personnel died in training flights. Eleven airmen were decorated with the Order of Michael the Brave: Lt. Ioan Peneș, Slt. Dumitru Darian, Lt. Petre Ioanin, Lt. Ermil Gheorghiu, Cpt. Vasile Craiu, Slt. Egon Nasta, Slt. Gheorghe Stâlpeanu, Cpt. Grigore Gafencu, Slt. Marcel Drăgușanu, Slt. Paul Magâlea, Maj. Constantin Cristescu, Cpt. Mihai Bădescu, Slt. Mihail Hurmuzescu and Lt. Col. Gheorghe Rujinschi.

Additionally, the French pilots of the Military Mission shot down 28 aircraft and four officers were decorated with the Order of Michael the Brave: Cpt. Maurice Gond, Cpt. Charles Mallet, Cpt. Augustin de Mailly-Nesle and Lt. Roger Lucy. Two airmen of the Military Mission died while flying for Romania, Slt. S. Cordonier and Adjutant James Texier. Their names were inscribed on the Monument to the Heroes of the Air in Bucharest.

== Interwar period ==
In the early interwar years, the military aviation included seven groups (two reconnaissance groups, one bomber, one fighter and a balloon group, as well as a technical operations and a training group), a seaplane squadron, an arsenal, as well as a central material depot. The Higher Directorate of Aeronautics, headed by Col. Gheorghe Rujinschi, and Maj. Haralambie Giossanu as the Chief of Staff, was the governing body within the Ministry of War. The "10th Aeronautical Directorate" (Direcția 10 aeronautică), led by Lt. Col. Andrei Popovici, the 5 Aviation Groups, the Sea Aviation Squadron, the Balloon Group and the technical operation group were subordinated to the Higher Directorate of Aeronautics. Subordinated to the 10th Aeronautical Directorate were the Aeronautical Arsenal, led by Major Ștefan Protopopescu, the central materials depot and a technical service led by Maj. Gheorghe Negrescu.

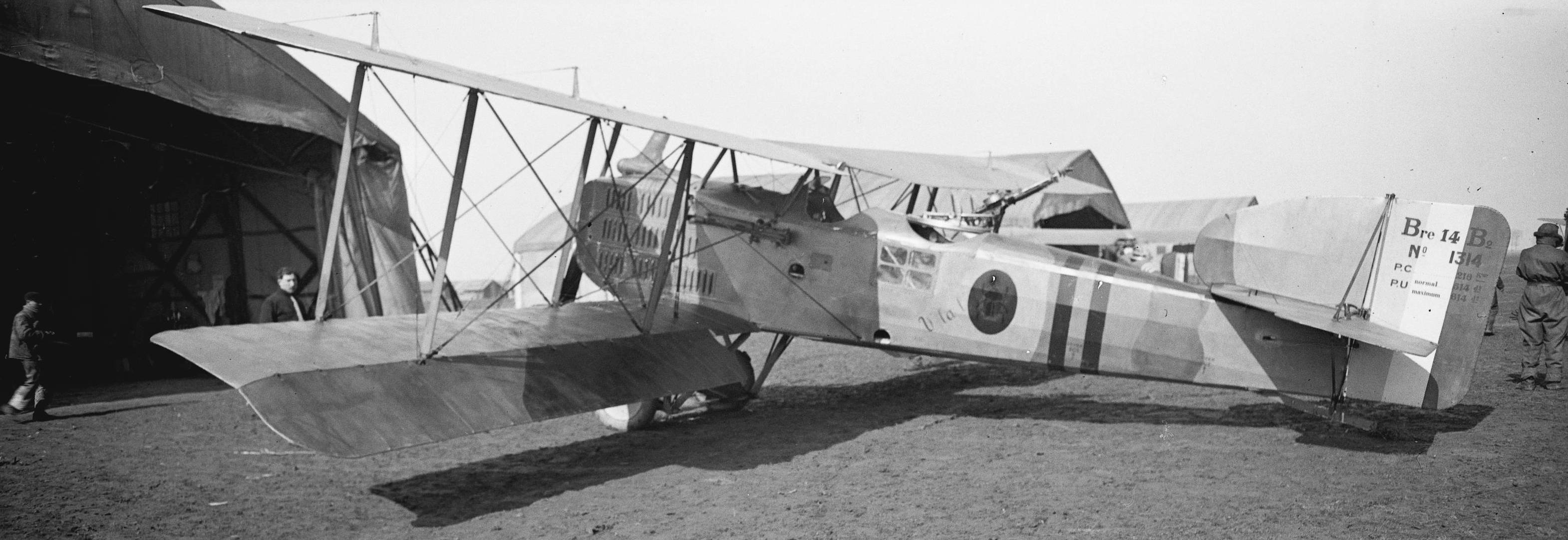
The first Bréguet 14s entered Romanian service in 1919

Although Romania did not have the financial and industrial resources to form and maintain large aviation units, the development Romanian military aviation managed to kept pace with the other European powers. From 1921, the aviation was organized for peacetime, with units being deployed in almost every province of the country. In order to continue equipping the squadrons of the RAC, Cpt. Mihai Savu was sent to Paris to negotiate the purchase of new airplanes. A contract was signed for the purchase of 101 SPAD fighters, 5 Caudron G.3 and 15 Nieuport 23. These aircraft were delivered by 11 August 1920. Another 150 Bréguets were ordered between 1921 and 1922. The number of aircraft in service with the RAC was about 240, this number will reach 560 by 1924.

Following the discussions of a committee formed by Col. Rujinschi, it was decided that aeronautical units would form garrisons in the following places: Iași with the surrounding areas, Bucharest, Galați, Craiova, Brașov and Constanța (where the hydroaviation was based). It was also decided to introduce the parachute, the type of parachute was to be decided by a study. Maj. Negrescu was in charge of this issue and would start negotiations with American companies in order to acquire the necessary material.

In order to maintain the training of all aviation personnel, the aviation units cooperated with the large infantry units in the summer of 1921, in the areas of Sibiu, Vălenii de Munte, Făgăraș and Sfântu Gheorghe. Also in 1921, the first school for aviation craftsmen was founded at the Pipera airfield. The school was moved to Mediaș in 1924 and transformed into the Technical School of Aeronautics, with the classes lasting between six and eight years. Some of the graduates of this school continued their studies, becoming mechanical officers, and others, aeronautical engineers.

== Aircraft designs, assembly and production ==
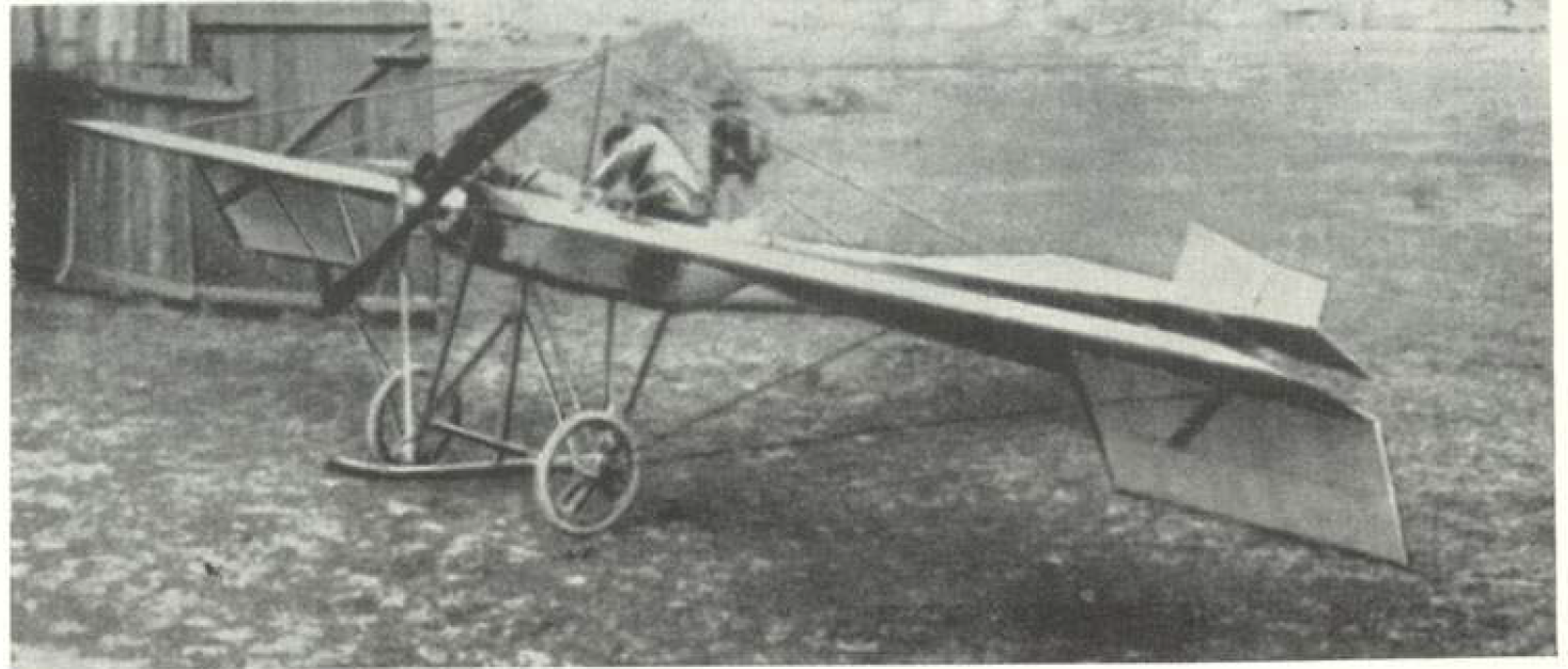
The aircraft built by Nicolae Saru-Ionescu at Cotroceni

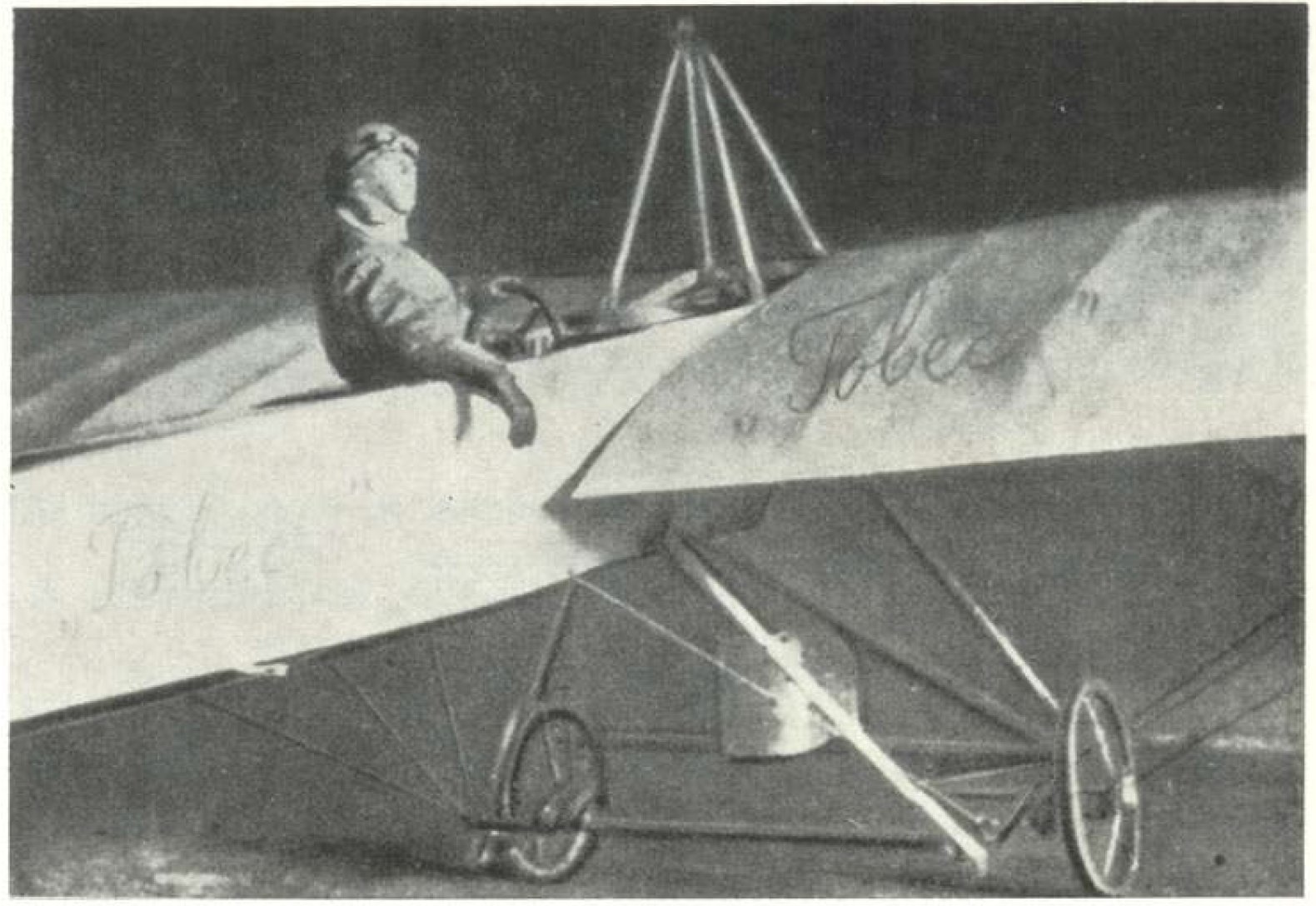
The 3-seat bomber built by Corneliu Marinescu, nicknamed Lăcusta (the Locust)

Aside from Aurel Vlacu, several other inventors designed and built aircraft in Romania, such as Nicolae Saru-Ionescu, who flew an airplane of his own design and construction at Cotroceni in 1911. However, he crashed on 28 August while performing a test flight and did not have the funds to repair his machine. The same year, another inventor, Corneliu Marinescu, designed a three-seat bomber. The airplane, nicknamed Lăcusta, had two seats in the fuselage for the pilot and observer, while the third seat for the bombardier was located under the fuselage. Although the performances of this machine were reportedly similar to other aircraft used in the military at that time, the authorities did not approve its serial construction.

The first license-built aircraft in Romania was the Farman III, with the Ministry of War ordering six from the Cerchez & Co. workshops in 1911. The next initiative to start an aeronautical industry in Romania dates from 30 March 1915. On this date, an association was established with the aim of designing and building aircraft. The 4 signatories were: Ion Stroescu, Tache Brumărescu, Corneliu Marinescu and Nicolae Tănase, but the association failed as it lacked sufficient funds.

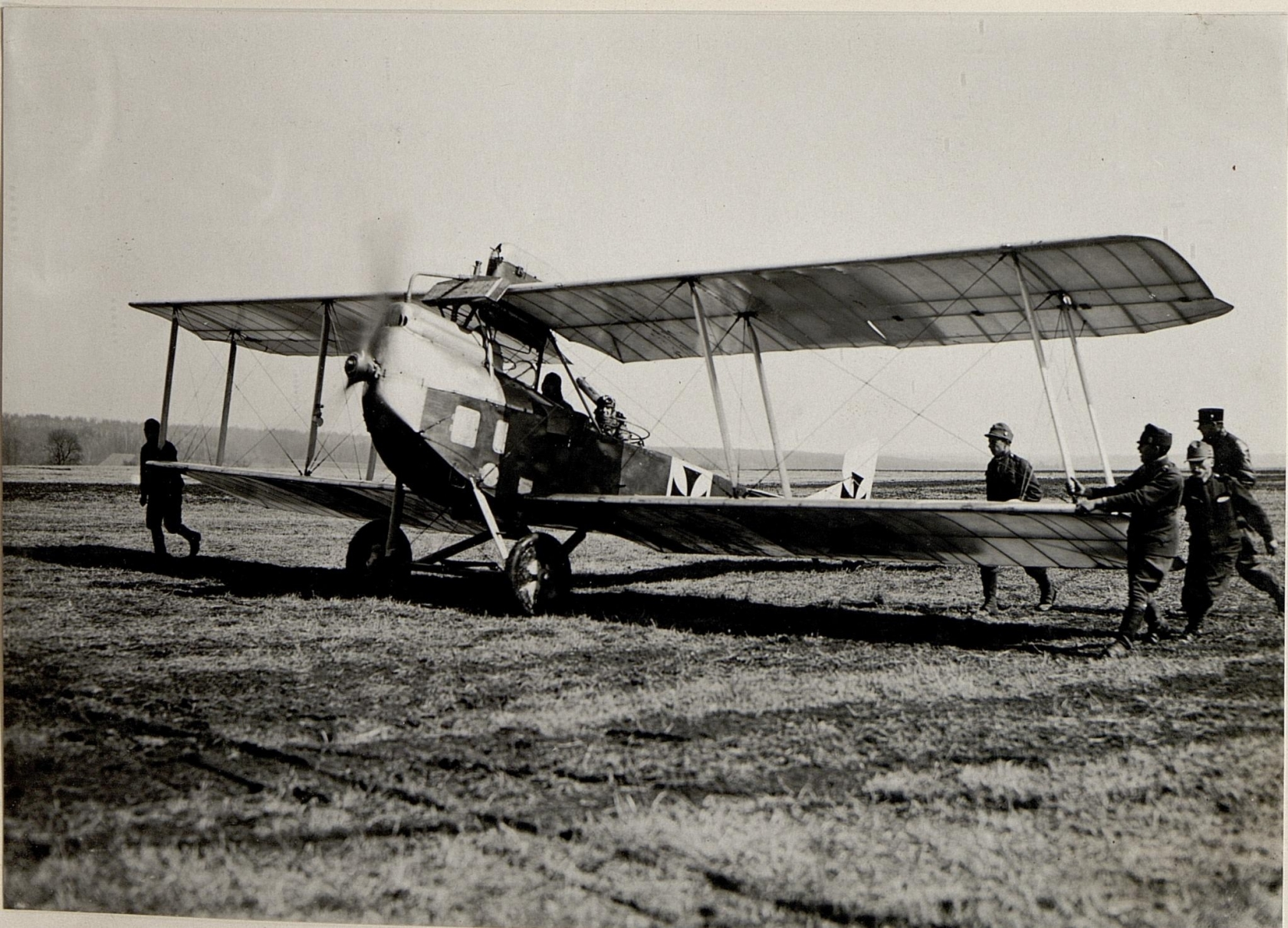
Hansa-Brandenburg C.I, the first mass-produced aircraft in Romania

In 1916, the workshops from Cotroceni and Băneasa were moved to Iași where Rezerva generală a aviației or RGA was established in a former slaughterhouse. Of the 322 aircraft that were received by Romania during the war, between 242 and 292 aircraft, as well as 545 aircraft engines, were assembled at RGA. With many airplanes arriving severely damaged from the journey through Russia, the engineers from RGA had to either repair or manufacture replacement parts.

After the war, in 1919, the RGA was moved back to Bucharest where Arsenalul Aeronautic was established. With the increase in need of training aircraft for the Piloting School of Tecuci, the Ministry of War approved the construction of Hansa-Brandenburg C.I at the new Arsenal. This was the first mass produced aircraft in Romania, with 120 aircraft equipped with Austro-Daimler 160 hp engines being manufactured between 1922 and 1923.

The first Romanian-designed aircraft to be serially produced was the Proto 1, which was designed in 1922 by Ștefan Protopopescu. However, this serial production was stopped following an accident, which resulted in the death of the test pilot Ioan Sava, and the design of the aircraft was improved. After the design changes were finished, 25 new Proto 2 airplanes were produced in 1924 (Note: After the establishment of the Romanian Air Force.) at the Astra Aircraft Factory in Arad.

== Roundels ==
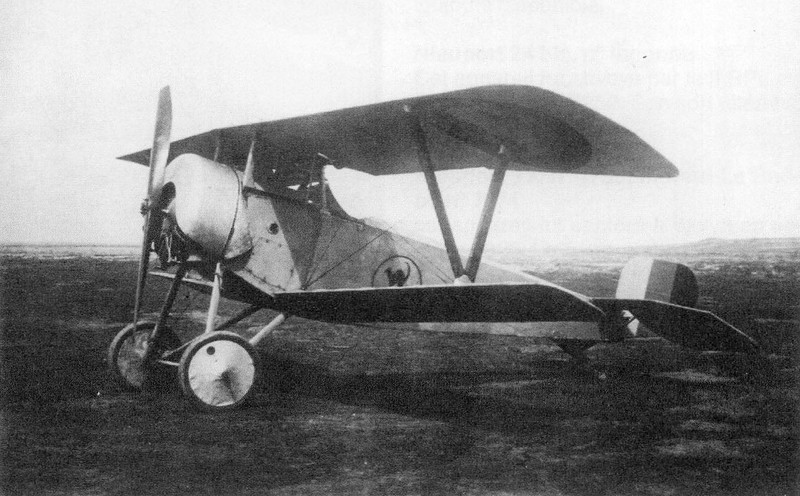
A Romanian Nieuport 11. The blue color on the tail appears nearly white in the black and white photograph.

First roundel of Romania, with the darker blue, seen in use in 1912.

As the RAC received most of its aircraft from France, the French markings were overpainted with yellow to match the Romanian national colors.

This roundel is seen on photographs from 1916, appearing on some aircraft.

The French roundel was also kept on some aircraft. Mainly on the ones flown by French pilots of the Military Mission, but some Romanian airmen flew on aircraft with French markings as well.

== See also ==
- Romania in World War I
- List of Romanian Air Force units & WW1
- Romanian military equipment of World War I

== Bibliography ==
- Avram, Valeriu; Armă, Alexandru (2018). Aeronautica română în Războiul de Întregire națională 1916-1919 (in Romanian). Editura Vremea. ISBN 978-973-645-853-8.
- Antoniu, Dan (2014). Illustrated History of Romanian Aeronautics. ISBN 978-973-0-17209-6.
