= List of Romanian Air Force units =

This is a list of Romanian Air Force and Romanian Air Corps units, past and present.

== Air units ==
=== Active ===
- 57th Air Base "Căptain Aviator Constantin Cantacuzino"
  - 57th Operational Group
    - 572nd Helicopter Squadron
- 71st Air Base "General Emanoil Ionescu"
  - 71st Operational Group
    - 48th Fighter Squadron
    - 58th Fighter Squadron
    - 713th Combat Helicopter Squadron
    - 712th Helicopter Squadron – based at Giarmata
- 86th Air Base "Locotenent Aviator Gheorghe Mociorniță"
  - 86th Operational Group
    - 53rd Fighter Squadron
    - European F-16 Training Center Squadron
- 90th Airlift Base "Comandor Aviator Gheorghe Bănciulescu"
  - 90th Operational Group
    - 901st Strategic Transport Squadron
    - 902nd Transport and Reconnaissance Squadron
    - 903rd Transport Helicopter Squadron
- 95th Air Base "Erou Căpitan Aviator Alexandru Șerbănescu"
  - 95th Operational Group
    - 951st Advanced Air Training Squadron
    - 952nd Combat Helicopter Squadron
- Air Force Application School "Aurel Vlaicu"
  - Aviation Training Group
    - 1st Air Training Squadron
    - 2nd Air Training Squadron

=== WW1 ===
==== 1916 ====
- Grupul 1 Escadrile (1st Squadron Group) - commanded by Cpt. Sturdza, assigned to the Romanian 1st Army. The group had 2 squadrons.
- Grupul 2 Escadrile - commanded by Lt. Pașcanu (replaced by Lt. Negerscu), assigned to the Romanian 2nd Army.
- Grupul 3 Escadrile - commanded by Cpt. Beroniade, assigned to the Romanian 3rd Army. The group had 3 squadrons:
  - Escadrila "București"
  - Escadrila "Alexandria"
  - Escadrila "Budești"
- Grupul 4 Escadrile - commanded by Lt. Giossanu, assigned to the Northern Army.

==== 1917 ====
Organization in the summer of 1917 - Order No. 1247/1917

- Grupul 1 Aeronautic Bacău, with its headquarters at Bacău and commanded by Maj. Alexandru Sturdza, assigned to the 2nd Romanian Army:
  - Escadrila F.2 - commanded by Cpt. Gheorghe Negrescu (until March), then by Captain Panait Cholet
  - Escadrila F.6 - commanded by Cpt. Scarlat Ștefănescu
  - Escadrila N.1 - commanded by Cpt. René Chambe
- Grupul 2 Aeronautic Tecuci, with its headquarters at Tecuci and commanded by Maj. Andrei Popovici, assigned to the 4th Russian Army (will be re-assigned to the 1st Romanian Army):
  - Escadrila F.4 - commanded by Cpt. Haralambie Giossanu
  - Escadrila F.7 - commanded by Cpt. André Goulin
  - Escadrila N.3 - commanded by Cpt. Maurice Gond
  - Escadrila F.9 - commanded by Cpt. Bertrand de Fraguier
  - Escadrila N.11 - commanded by Cpt. Ștefan Protopopescu
  - Escadrila C.12
- Grupul 3 Aeronautic Galați, with its headquarters at Galați and commanded by Cpt. Nicolae Capșa, assigned to the 1st Romanian Army (will be re-assigned to the 6th Russian Army):
  - Escadrila F.5 - commanded by Cpt. Radu Irimescu
  - Escadrila N.10 - commanded by Cpt. Paul Bléry
  - Escadrila B.M.8 - commanded by Cpt. Armand Délas

==== 1918 ====
From January 1918:

- Grupul 1 Aeronautic Bacău, commanded by Maj. Athanase Enescu:
  - Escadrila F.6 - renamed to Escadrila S.6 after receiving Sopwith 1½ Strutters
  - Escadrila F.2
  - Escadrila N.1
  All squadrons of this group were based at Bacău.
- Grupul 2 Aeronautic Tecuci, commanded by Maj. Sever Pleniceanu:
  - Escadrila F.5 - with the aerodrome at Bârlad
  - Escadrila S.8 - ex-B.M.8
  - Escadrila N.11 - at Adjud
  - Escadrila N.3 - at Tecuci
- Grupul 3 Aeronautic Roman, with the headquarters at Roman and commanded by Maj. Haralambie Giossanu:
  - Escadrila F.9 - aerodrome at Fălticeni
  - Escadrila S.12 - ex-C.12, with the aerodrome at Dorohoi
  - Escadrila N.10 - at Botoșani

From February 1918, a new group was formed in Bessarabia:

- Grupul Aeronautic basarabean
  - Escadrila F.4
  - Escadrila N.3bis

=== Hungarian-Romanian War of 1919 ===
- Grupul 5 Aviație ("5th Aviation Group"), with the headquarters at Sibiu and commanded by Major Athanase Enescu:
  - Escadrila S.2 - renamed to Escadrila B.2 after receiving Bréguet 14 aircraft. It was led by Lt. Emanoil Ionescu
  - Escadrila N.7 - commanded by Lt. Iosif Răcășanu
  - Escadrila S.12 - based at Gherla, commanded by Cpt. Gheorghe Racoveanu

=== Interwar ===
Organization on 20 March 1920

- Grupul 1 Recunoaștere Iași
- Grupul 2 Bombardament București
- Grupul 3 Vânătoare Galați
- Grupul 4 Instrucție Tecuci
- Grupul 5 Recunoaștere Cluj
- Escadrila de Hidroaviație Constanța

In 1929, the Groups were converted to Aviation Flotillas. Grupul 4 was converted to the Aviation Training Center.

=== WW2 ===
Fighter units

- 1st Fighter Flotilla
  - 5th Fighter Group (Grupul 5 Vânătoare)
    - 10th Fighter Squadron - 51st Fighter Squadron from October 1939
    - 11th Fighter Squadron - 52nd Fighter Squadron from October 1939
    - 53rd Fighter Squadron
  - 7th Fighter Group (Grupul 7 Vânătoare)
    - 56th Fighter Squadron
    - 57th Fighter Squadron
    - 58th Fighter Squadron
  - 9th Fighter Group (Grupul 9 Vânătoare)
    - 47th Fighter Squadron
    - 48th Fighter Squadron
    - 56th Fighter Squadron
- 2nd Fighter Flotilla
  - 1st Fighter Group (Grupul 1 Vânătoare)
    - 43rd Fighter Squadron
    - 63rd Fighter Squadron
    - 64th Fighter Squadron
  - 6th Fighter Group (Grupul 6 Vânătoare)
    - 59th Fighter Squadron
    - 60th Fighter Squadron
    - 61st Fighter Squadron
    - 62nd Fighter Squadron
  - 8th Fighter Group (Grupul 8 Vânătoare) - 8th Assault Group (Grupul 8 Asalt) from May 1943
    - 41st Fighter Squadron
    - 42nd Fighter Squadron
    - 59th Fighter Squadron (moved to Grupul 6)
- 3rd Fighter Flotilla
  - 2nd Fighter Group (Grupul 2 Vânătoare)
    - 65th Fighter Squadron
    - 66th Fighter Squadron
    - 67th Fighter Squadron
    - 50th Fighter Squadron
  - 3rd Fighter Group
    - 41st Fighter Squadron
    - 44th Fighter Squadron
    - 49th Fighter Squadron
  - 4th Fighter Group
    - 45th Fighter Squadron
    - 46th Fighter Squadron
- 1st Night Fighter Squadron (Escadrila 1 Vânătoare de Noapte)

Bomber units

- 1st Bomber Flotilla
  - 1st Bomber Group (Grupul 1 Bombardament)
    - 71st Bomber Squadron
    - 72nd Bomber Squadron
  - 4th Bomber Group (Grupul 4 Bombardament)
    - 76th Bomber Squadron
    - 78th Bomber Squadron
  - 8th Assault Group (Grupul 8 Asalt)
    - 41st Assault Squadron - ex-41st Fighter Squadron
    - 42nd Assault Squadron - ex-42nd Fighter Squadron
    - 60th Assault Squadron - ex-60th Fighter Squadron
- 2nd Bomber Flotilla
  - 2nd Bomber Group (Grupul 2 Bombardament)
    - 82nd Bomber Squadron
    - 83rd Bomber Squadron
  - 7th Bomber Group (Grupul 7 Bombardament)
    - 17th Light Bomber Squadron
    - 18th Light Bomber Squadron
- 3rd Bomber Flotilla
  - 3rd Bomber/Dive Bomber Group (Grupul 3 Bombardament/picaj)
    - 73rd Bomber/Dive Squadron
    - 81st Bomber/Dive Squadron
    - 85th Bomber/Dive Squadron
  - 5th Bomber Group (Grupul 5 Bombardament)
    - 77th Bomber Squadron
    - 79th Bomber Squadron
    - 80th Bomber Squadron
  - 6th Bomber/Dive Bomber Group (Grupul 6 Bombardament/picaj)
    - 74th Bomber/Dive Squadron
    - 86st Bomber/Dive Squadron
    - 87th Bomber/Dive Squadron

Reconnaissance Units

- 1st Long Range Recon Group (Grupul 1 Recunoaștere Îndepărtată)
  - 1st Long Range Recon Squadron
  - 2nd Long Range Recon Squadron
  - 3rd Long Range Recon Squadron
  - 4th Long Range Recon Squadron
- 2nd Guard Aviation Flotilla
  - 1st Guard Group (Grupul 1 Gardă)
    - 11th Observation Squadron
    - 12th Observation Squadron
  - 2nd Guard Group (Grupul 2 Gardă)
    - 13th Observation Squadron
    - 14th Observation Squadron

Transport Units

- Air Transport Group (Grupul de Aero-Transport)
  - 105th Transport Squadron
  - 106th Transport Squadron
  - 108th Light Transport Squadron - known as Escadrila Albă ("White Squadron")
  - 109th Glider Transport Squadron

Liaison Units

- 111th, 112th, 113th, 115th, 116th Liaison Squadrons (Escadrile de Legătură)

=== Cold War ===
Organization on 12 September 1956 - Order No. CL 00430

- Territorial Antiaircraft Defense Command (Comandamentul Apararii Antiaeriene a Teritoriului)
  - 23rd Fighter Aviation Division (Divizia 23 Aviație Vânătoare) – Otopeni
    - 206th Fighter Aviation Regiment (Regimentul 206 Aviație Vânătoare) – Otopeni Airdrome; 86th Fighter Aviation Regiment from January 1959
    - 125th Fighter Aviation Regiment – Siliștea Gumești Airdrome; 49th Fighter Aviation Regiment from January 1959
    - 172nd Fighter Aviation Regiment – Mihail Kogălniceanu Airdrome; 57th Fighter Aviation Regiment from January 1959
  - 66th Fighter Aviation Division – Craiova
    - 158th Fighter Aviation Regiment – Craiova Airdrome; 67th Fighter Aviation Regiment from January 1959
    - 226th Fighter Aviation Regiment – Deveselu Airdrome; 91st Fighter Aviation Regiment from January 1959
    - 227th Fighter Aviation Regiment – Craiova Airdrome; 34th Fighter Aviation Regiment from January 1959
  - 97th Fighter Aviation Division – Giarmata
    - 294th Fighter Aviation Regiment – Giarmata Airdrome; 93rd Fighter Aviation Regiment from January 1959
    - 135th Fighter Aviation Regiment – Caransebeș Airdrome; 37th Fighter Aviation Regiment from January 1959
  - 68th Assault Aviation Division (Divizia 68 Aviație Asalt)
  - 239th Bombardment Aviation Regiment (Regimentul 239 Aviație Bombardament) – Otopeni Airdrome
  - 282nd Reconnaissance Aviation Regiment (Regimentul 282 Aviație Cercetare) – Târgșoru Nou Airdrome

On 27 February 1960, several regiments and the Aviation Divisions were disbanded. The following fighter units remained:

- 49th Fighter-Bomber Aviation Regiment – Alexeni Airdrome; moved to the Ianca Airdrome in 1965
- 57th Fighter Aviation Regiment – Mihail Kogălniceanu Airdrome
- 67th Fighter-Bomber Aviation Regiment – Craiova Airdrome
- 86th Fighter Aviation Regiment – Cocargeaua Airdrome
- 91st Fighter Aviation Regiment – Deveselu Airdrome
- 93rd Fighter Aviation Regiment – Giarmata Airdrome

== Other units ==
=== Aerostation Units ===
==== WW1 ====
- 1st Aerostation Company (Compania 1 Aerostație)
- 2nd, 3rd, 4th, 5th Aerostation Companies

==== Interwar ====
- Grupul de Aerostație București
- Regimentul 1 Aerostație București-Pantelimon

=== Ground units ===
- 16th Air Defense Division
- 34th Air Defense Division
- 1st Surface-to-air Missiles Brigade
- 11th Surface-to-air Missiles Regiment
- 70th Aviation Engineer Regiment
- 74th Patriot Regiment
- 85th Signal Battalion
- Combat Search and Rescue Detachment

== Bibliography ==
- Antoniu, Dan (2019). "Emanoil Ionescu "Pipițu" (1893-1949)". Aviația clujeană (PDF) (in Romanian). Cluj-Napoca: Casa Cărții de Știință. ISBN 9786061715053.
- Avram, Valeriu; Armă, Alexandru (2018). Aeronautica română în Războiul de Întregire națională 1916-1919 (in Romanian). Editura Vremea. ISBN 978-973-645-853-8.
- Avram, Valeriu (2008). "Campania din Basarabia (ianuarie – iulie 1918)" (PDF). Buletinul Arhivelor Militare Române (in Romanian). No. 40/2008. pp. 47–50. ISSN 1454-0924.
- Axworthy, Mark (1995). Third Axis, Fourth Ally: Romanian Armed Forces in the European War, 1941–1945. London: Arms and Armour.
- Pană, Viorel (December 2019). "Aeronautica Română în apărarea frontierelor Marii Uniri - 1919" (PDF). Străjer în calea furtunilor (in Romanian). No. 26. Buzău: EditGraph. p. 40. ISSN 1843-4045.
- Sandachi, Paul (2001). Aviația de luptă reactivă în România: 1951 - 2001. Muzeul Aviației.
- "Romanian Royal Aeronautics | Units".
- "Unitați de luptă dotate cu IAR 80/81". iar80flyagain.org (in Romanian). 2022-05-29.
