= Grupul 1 Aeronautic =

Military unit of Romanian Air Corps

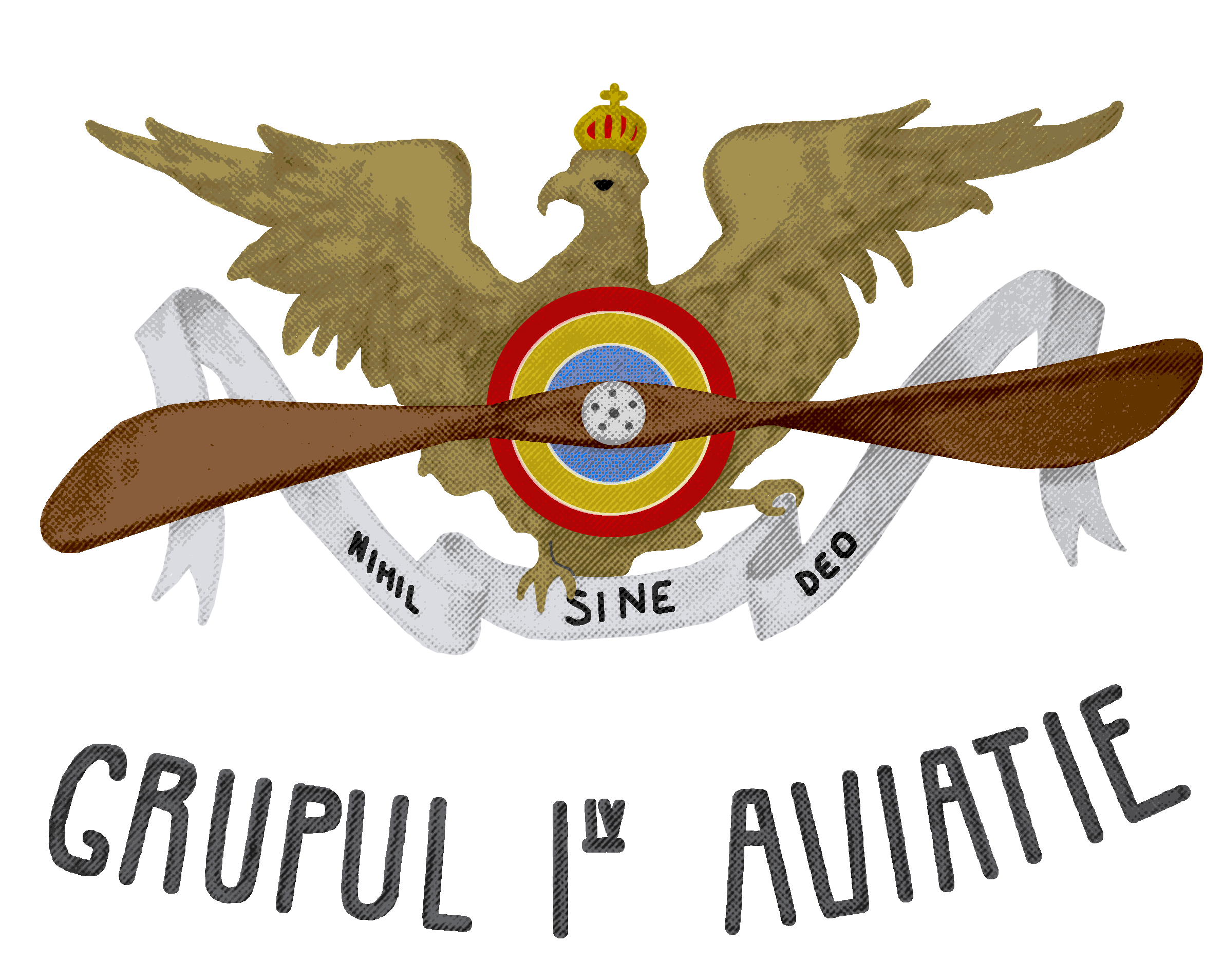
- Emblem of the Group, 1919
- Active: 1916 – 1929
- Country: Romania
- Branch: Romanian Air Corps
- Type: Aeronautical Group
- Garrison/HQ: Bacău
- Engagements: First World War: Romanian Campaign (1917); Battle of Mărăști; Third Battle of Oituz

Commanders
- Notable commanders: Alexandru Sturdza; Ștefan Protopopescu

Grupul 1 Aeronautic ("1st Aeronautical Group" in English), also known as Grupul 1 Aviație ("1st Aviation Group") was one of the three groups of the Romanian Air Corps created following the aviation reorganization in the winter of 1916/1917. After the war, the Group was eventually transformed into the 1st Reconnaissance Group, then into the 1st Aviation Flotilla in 1929.

== History ==
After the reorganization of the Romanian Air Corps in the winter of 1916/1917, under the advice of the French Military Mission, 3 Aeronautical groups were created. Each composed of 2 reconnaissance and 1 fighter squadrons and each assigned to a Romanian or Russian army. Grupul 1 Aeronautic with its headquarters at Bacău was assigned to the 2nd Romanian Army.

The group, commanded by Major (Maj.) Sturdza, was composed the following squadrons:

- Escadrila F.2 - commanded by Captain (Cpt.) Gheorghe Negrescu (until March), then by Captain Panait Cholet
- Escadrila F.6 - commanded by Cpt. Scarlat Ștefănescu
- Escadrila N.1 - commanded by Cpt. René Chambe

=== Campaign of 1917 ===
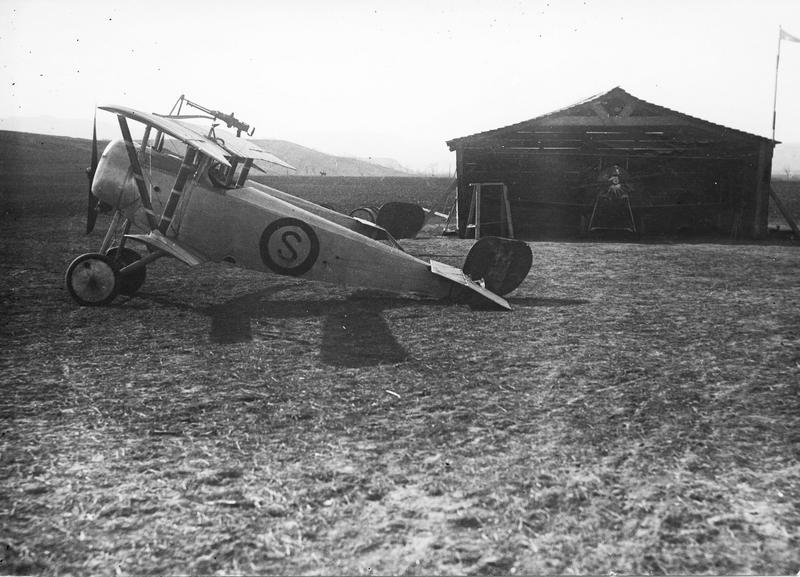
Nieuport fighters of the group in 1917

Grupul 1 Aeronautic together with Grupul 2 Aeronautic contributed to the Battle of Mărăști. On 15 August 1917, the airmen of the group carried out 18 reconnaissance, bombing missions, photographing the enemy positions on the front of the 2nd Romanian Army.

In preparation for an offensive on the Oituz Valley, the airmen of Grupul 1 Aeronautic executed numerous reconnaissance missions between 3 - 7 September 1917, the fighter pilots of N.1 squadron continued patrolling the front-line, engaging aircraft of the Central Powers. On 8 September, airmen of the F.2 and N.1 squadrons engaged enemy aircraft over Târgu Ocna, Cireșoaia and Slănic. The next day, managing to shoot down 3 aircraft. Between 9 - 12 September, 18 combat missions were completed, with dogfights being carried out in 12 of them. Two enemy aircraft were brought down, while the reconnaissance squadrons managed to photograph the whole front between Cireșoaia-Cașin and the Coșna Hill.

From 22 September 1917, Grupul 1 Aeronautic was composed of:

- Escadrila F.2 and Escadrila N.1 - with the aerodrome at Borzești
- Escadrila F.6 - at Gârbovanul

=== 1918 ===
From January 1918, Grupul 1 Aeronautic was commanded by Maj. Athanase Enescu. All squadrons of the group were located at Bacău. Following Order no. 275/1918, the squadrons of the group were moved to auxiliary airfields, closer to the front-line in Bessarabia.

=== 1919 ===
In 1919, the N.1 and B.4 (ex-F.4) squadrons, part of Grupul 1 Aviație commanded by Major Ștefan Protopopescu, set their base at Chișinău, in order to support the Romanian troops of Grupul general Popovici. (Escadrila N.10, which was part of Grupul 3 Aeronautic, was also sent to the front, being based at Cernăuți. All 3 squadrons executed mainly reconnaissance and bombing missions. The S.2 Squadron which was previously part of the 1st Group, was assigned to the newly formed 5th Aviation Group in Transylvania. It returned to the Group in 1920.

=== 1920–1929 ===
By 1920, the group was located in Iași, where it would be named the 1st Reconnaissance Group. In 1928, all reconnaissance groups were renamed to aviation groups, the 1st Reconnaissance Group being renamed to the 1st Aviation Group. With the increase in increase in aircraft and personnel, the aviation groups were converted to flotillas (air wings).

== 1st Aviation Flotilla ==
The newly established 1st Aviation Flotilla comprised an observation and reconnaissance group, a fighter group, and also specialty squadrons. Around 1938–1939, the flotilla was transformed into the 1st Information Flotilla (Flotila 1 Informații). It consisted of the 19th, 20th, 21st, and 22nd Observation squadrons, and was equipped with IAR 37, 38, and 39 airplanes.

== See also ==
- Grupul 2 Aeronautic
- List of Romanian Air Force units

== Bibliography ==
- Buzenchi, Laurențiu (2019). "Aeronautica militară română – Cluj". Aviația clujeană (PDF) (in Romanian). Cluj-Napoca: Casa Cărții de Știință.
- Pătrașcu, Gabriel (2020). "Unitățile de gardă ale Aeronauticii și Marinei Regale (1930-1947)" (PDF). Revista Misiunea (in Romanian). No. 1/2020.
- Lazar, Adrian; Stambuliu, Bogdan (2016). Military and sociopolitical badges of Romania 1859-1947. Bucharest: Galeria Numismatica.
