= 2nd Guard Aviation Flotilla =

- Flotila 2 Aviație de Gardă
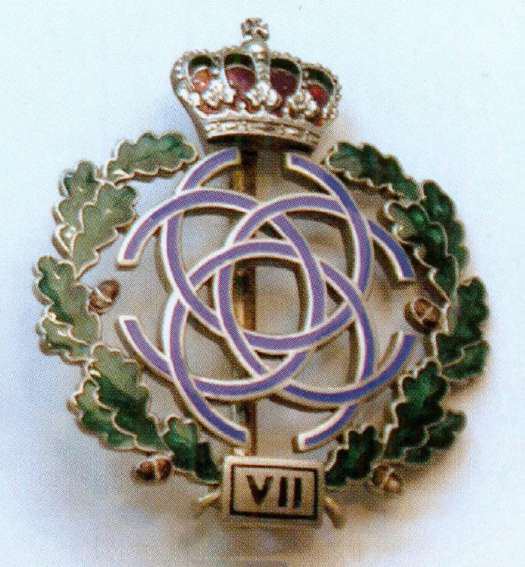
- Seven years of service insignia of the Flotilla
- Active: 1929–1940 (?)
- Country: Romania
- Branch: Royal Romanian Air Force
- Type: Air Flotilla
- Garrison/HQ: Someșeni airfield, Cluj County
- Patron: King Carol II of Romania
- Anniversaries: 6 June
- Decorations: Order of Aeronautical Virtue

The 2nd Guard Aviation Flotilla (Romanian: Flotila 2 Aviație de Gardă), also known as Flotila 2 Aeronautică de Gardă ("2nd Guard Aeronautical Flotilla") was an Aviation Flotilla of the Royal Romanian Air Force formed in 1929 following the general restructuring of the Air Force. In 1930, it became patroned by King Carol II, being designated as a Guard unit a year later.

== History ==
=== 5th Aviation Group ===
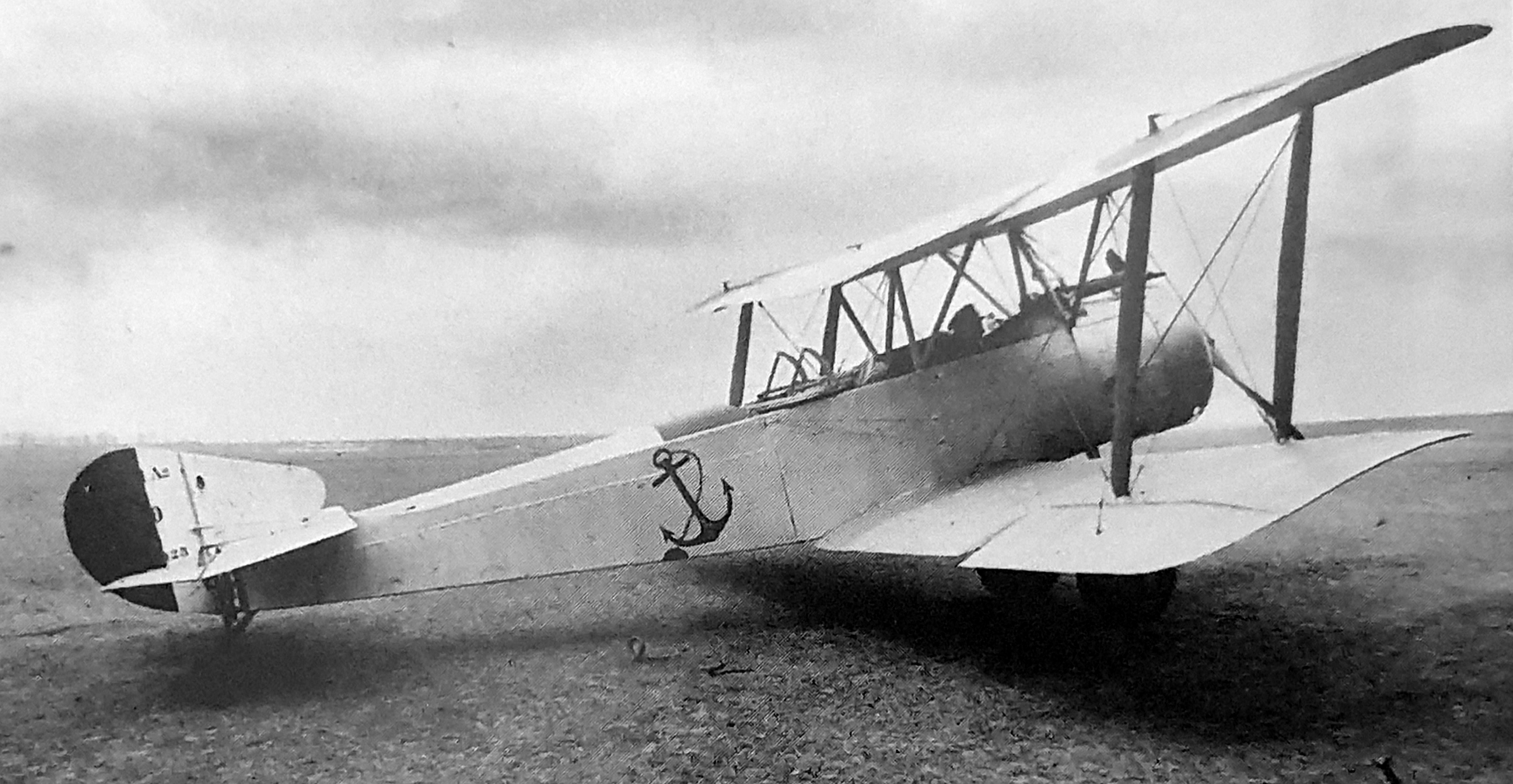
A Romanian Sopwith 1½ Strutter in 1919

The 2nd Aviation Flotilla has its origins with the 5th Aviation Group (Grupul 5 Aviație). On 10 December 1918, the command of the Romanian army in Transylvania was established in Sibiu. This Army Command was assigned a reconnaissance squadron and a maintenance unit under the command of Major Athanase Enescu, forming Grupul 5 Aviație.

On 1 February 1919, the Group received a Nieuport Squadron which was stationed in Someșeni, and on 15 February a Sopwith Squadron which was based in Gherla. In March 1919, Grupul 5 Aviație, nicknamed Grupul ardelean, consisted of three squadrons: Escadrila S.2, which eventually became Escadrila B.2 after receiving Bréguet 14 aircraft, Escadrila N.7, and Escadrila S.12. Transylvanian Saxon airmen who enrolled in the Romanian Air Corps were also assigned to the 5th Aviation Group. The Group participated in the Hungarian-Romanian War.

After the capture of Budapest on 4 August 1919, the Group was transferred to a base in the city, where it remained until September. The squadrons were then moved to Kecskemét, Lugoj, and Arad to monitor the Serbian Army activity on the Romanian border until 20 August 1920. In October of the same year, the Group was assigned a Brandenburg Squadron while Escadrila B.2 was transferred to its original group, Grupul 1 Aeronautic.

After the disbanding of the Romanian General Headquarters (M.C.G.), the Aviation was subordinated to the Ministry of War, and the Aviation Groups were subordinated to the new Higher Directorate of Aeronautics. The name of the 5th Group was kept until 1923 when it was changed to the 2nd Reconnaissance Group. In 1928, the reconnaissance groups were renamed to aviation groups, with the 2nd Reconnaissance Group becoming the 2nd Aeronautical Group.

=== 2nd Aviation Flotilla ===
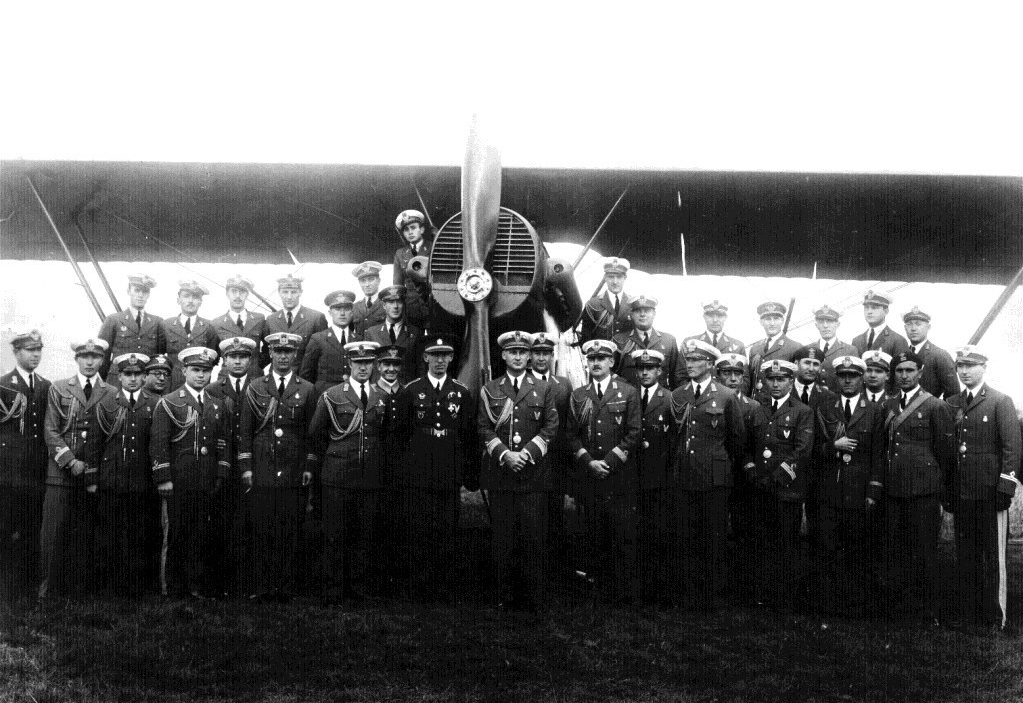
Visit of the Czechoslovak Air Force Chief of Staff to the 2nd Guard Aviation Flotilla in 1934

The 2nd Aeronautical Group with its base at Someșeni-Cluj kept its organization until 1929, when the groups were converted to flotillas with the increase in aircraft and personnel. In June 1930, Prince Carol II rented an airplane from München in order to return to Romania. On the way, the aircraft ran out of fuel and had to perform an emergency landing at Izvoru Crișului near Cluj. The aircraft was recovered by a military patrol from the 2nd Flotilla and Carol was flown with a military airplane by airmen from the Flotilla to Bucharest on 6 June. As a sign of gratitude to the aviators, Carol became the patron of the 2nd Flotilla after he gained the throne. He also founded the Order of Aeronautical Virtue for the same reason.

With Carol's patronage, the Flotilla changed its name to the 2nd Aviation Flotilla "King Carol II", and it received distinctive insignia for the uniforms. In 1931, it received the status of a guard unit and was renamed to the 2nd Guard Aviation Flotilla "King Carol II" (Flotila 2 Aviație de Gardă "Regele Carol al II-lea"). As a Guard unit, the Flotilla received the following tasks: during peacetime, apart from the training of specialized personnel and aircrews, the Flotilla was to ensure the reception of the King on arrival in the garrison, escorting him to all parades and solemnities, and send some officers to certain ceremonies; during wartime, the Flotilla was to be used on the front according to the M.C.G. requirements. Also in 1931, the official anniversary of the Flotilla was set to 6 June.

The organization of the 2nd Guard Aviation Flotilla in 1932 was as follows:

- Reconnaissance Group (Grupul Recunoaștere), with three reconnaissance squadrons (Escadrile de Recunoaștere)
- Fighter Group (Grupul Vânătoare), with two fighter squadrons (Escadrile de Vânătoare), a specialist squadron, a maintenance squadron, and a deposit squadron.

In 1932, the battle flag of the unit was decorated with the Golden Cross rank of the Order of Aeronautical Virtue. In November 1936, the aviators of the 2nd Reconnaissance Squadron executed a "raid" to Poland on the Cluj-Lwów-Demblin-Warsaw-Radom-Jarosław-Cluj route with an IAR-built Potez 25.

On the mobilization order in September 1939, the Flotilla consisted of four Air Corps Commands (Comandamente Aero Corp Armată) with the 1st Long Range Reconnaissance Squadron equipped with the Bristol Blenheim; the 11th, 12th and 13th Observation Squadrons; and the 111th and 112th Liaison Squadrons.

== After the Second Vienna Award ==
When the Second Vienna Award was signed, the 2nd Aviation Flotilla was still deployed at Someșeni. Following this, it was relocated to Mediaș, but it retained the same organization. With the reorganization of the Romanian military in 1940, the Flotilla was disbanded and its squadrons were redistributed to other units.

On the establishment of the Air Combat Group (Gruparea Aeriană de Luptă) on 22 June 1941, the 2nd Guard Aviation Flotilla appeared again with the 1st and 2nd Guard Groups and the 11th, 12th, 13th, and 14th Observation Squadrons. The headquarters were located at Sihlele. On 1 July 1941, the 2nd Guard Aviation Flotilla was put at the disposal of the Air Command of the 4th Army. The Air Combat Group was disbanded at the end of the 1941 campaign.

== See also ==
- List of Romanian Air Force units
- RoAF 71st Air Base
- Michael the Brave 30th Guards Brigade

== Bibliography ==
- Avram, Valeriu; Armă, Alexandru (2018). Aeronautica română în Războiul de Întregire națională 1916-1919 (in Romanian). Editura Vremea. ISBN 978-973-645-853-8.
- Buzenchi, Laurențiu (2019). "Aeronautica militară română – Cluj". Aviația clujeană (PDF) (in Romanian). Cluj-Napoca: Casa Cărții de Știință.
- Pătrașcu, Gabriel (2020). "Unitățile de gardă ale Aeronauticii și Marinei Regale (1930-1947)" (PDF). Revista Misiunea (in Romanian). No. 1/2020.
