= Zeppelin LZ 56 =

1915 Zeppelin P-class rigid airship

LZ 56 / LZ 86
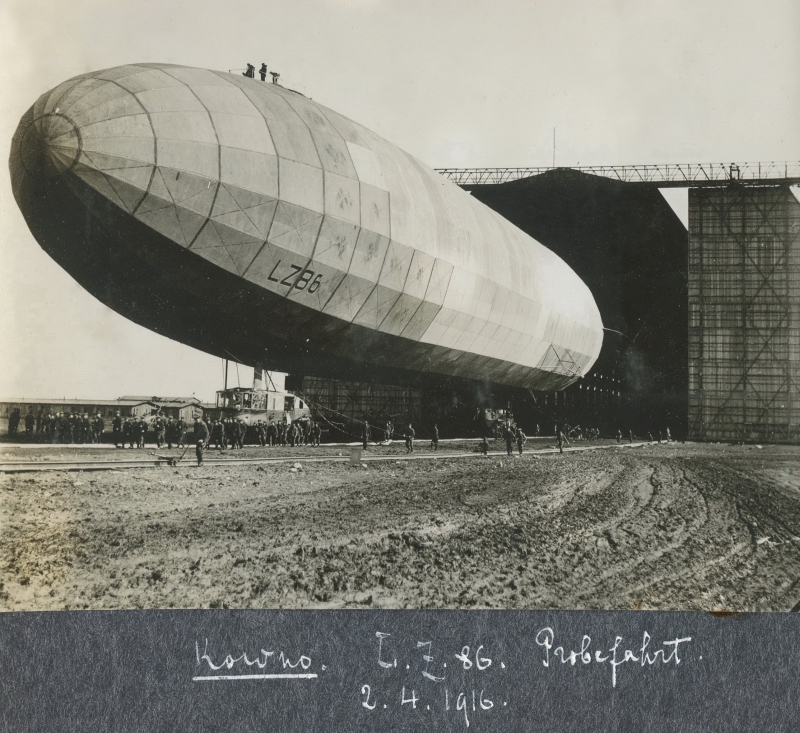
- LZ-86 emerging from the hangar at Kowno, occupied Lithuania, 2 April 1916.

General information
- Other names: LZ-56 (production number); LZ-86 / L-86 (operational/tactical number)
- Type: P-class rigid airship
- National origin: German Empire
- Manufacturer: Luftschiffbau Zeppelin
- Designer: Ludwig Dürr
- Built by: Luftschiffbau Zeppelin (Löwenthal/Friedrichshafen)
- Primary user: Heer (Imperial German Army)
- Service: 1915–1916
- Major applications: Reconnaissance and strategic bombing
- Number built: 1
- Construction number: LZ 56
- Serial: LZ-86

History
- Manufactured: 10 October 1915
- First flight: 10 October 1915
- In service: 1915–1916
- Last flight: 4 September 1916
- Fate: Crashed on landing approach near Utvin (Timișoara region), 4 September 1916; 9 fatalities

Zeppelin LZ 56 (operationally referred to as LZ 86 or tactical number L-86) was a German rigid airship built by Luftschiffbau Zeppelin and operated by the Heer during the First World War. It performed seven attacks dropping a total of 14,800 kg (32,600 lb) of bombs along the Eastern and South-Eastern front before crashing on approach to its base in early September 1916.

== Design and construction ==
LZ 56 was constructed by Luftschiffbau Zeppelin at the Löwenthal/Friedrichshafen works and is recorded in contemporary material as production number LZ 56. Period and later sources commonly identify the ship operationally as LZ-86 (tactical number L-86). The ship belonged to the P-class series (often used for eastern operations), and was later converted to the Q-class in April 1916. The process involved lengthening the hull to increase gas volume and replacing the engines.

== Operational history ==
LZ 56/LZ 86 operated on the eastern and south-eastern fronts from bases including Schneidemühl, Königsberg and Kowno, and was later deployed to the Temesvár/Timișoara area in August 1916 following the start of operations against Romanian targets after Romania's entry into the war. The airship participated in seven bombing missions on the eastern and south-eastern fronts, dropping a total of about 14,800 kg (32,600 lb) of bombs against targets in Dünaburg, Rēzekne, the Minsk-Molodechno area, and in Romania.

=== Loss ===
On the night of 3/4 September 1916, the airship took part in operations against Bucharest and the oil-refining town of Ploiești. During the raid, the zeppelin was spotted by searchlights and took heavy anti-aircraft fire. Due to the damage received, LZ 56 lost a lot of hydrogen, leading to the airship becoming uncontrollable on the landing approach to its base at Szentandrás. The airship proceeded to hit the ground with the rear half, causing the rear gondola to break off. After losing the gondola, the airship began rising due to the loss of mass. During this climb, the forward gondola detached.

The remaining crew members aboard the zeppelin managed to open the hydrogen cells so the airship could descend. The contemporary record indicates that the main body of LZ 56 crashed near the village of Utvin, some 80 km (50 mi) away from the zeppelin base.

== Aftermath and memorial ==
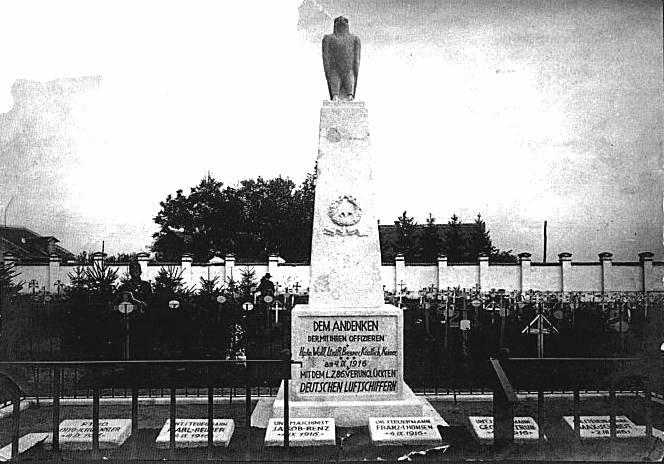
The grave site and memorial to the LZ 86 crew

Of the 14 crew members, 9 were killed. Five of them were buried in Timișoara and a monument marks their graves. A 6th grave located in the same memorial site belongs to a navigator from LZ 55/LZ 85 who died earlier in 1916.

== Bibliography ==
- Robinson, Douglas H. Giants in the Sky: The History of the German Airship, 1900–1930. Henley-on-Thames: Foulis, 1973. ISBN 0-85429-145-8. (see related operational notes).
- Meyer, Peter. Das Grosse Luftschiffbuch. (See entries on P-/R-class Zeppelins.)
- Warplanes & Air Battles of World War I, Phoebus (see entries on German rigid airships).
