= Gheorghe Mihăilescu =

Romanian World War I pilot

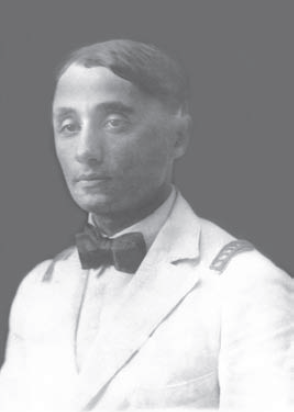
- Gheorghe Mihăilescu, post-war photo
- Born: 2 February 1888; Alexandria, Kingdom of Romania
- Died: Unknown
- Military career
- Allegiance: Romania
- Branch: Romanian Navy (1908–1913); Romanian Air Corps (1913–1919)
- Service years: 1908–1919
- Rank: Captain
- Units: Grupul 1 Aeronautic, Escadrila N.1
- Conflicts: Second Balkan War; First World War
- Awards: Order of Saint Anna; Order of the Star of Romania; Croix de Guerre

Gheorghe Mihăilescu (2 February 1888 – Unknown) was a Romanian World War I pilot, credited with four victories by Romanian standards and eight including shared ones.

== Early life ==
Gheorghe Mihăilescu was born on 2 February 1888 in Alexandria, Teleorman County. He attended the Military School of Artillery, Engineering and Navy, receiving the rank of Sublocotenent (Slt.) on 1 July 1908. He attended the Piloting School of the National Air League (Liga Națională Aeriană), obtaining pilot license no.19 on 11 October 1913.

== Military career ==
During the Second Balkan War, he flew with Section II of Aviation (Secția II de Aviație), commanded by Captain (Cpt.) George Valentin Bibescu, executing a number of missions.

In the summer of 1914, during the visit of Tsar Nicholas II of Russia, he flew over the Imperial ship together with Constantin Beroniade, Andrei Popovici, Alexandru Sturdza, and Poly Vacas and put up a show for the Tsar. Before the war, he also served as an instructor at the Băneasa Flight School, and on 1 July 1916, he was promoted to the rank of Lieutenant.

After Romania entered World War I on the side of the Allies in August 1916, he was first deployed in Dobruja, then he was assigned to Grupul 1 Escadrile at Râureni. On 1 January 1917, he was appointed administrative commander of Escadrila N.1. On 22 January 1917, he scored his first victory over a German aircraft which crashed behind enemy lines over the front of the 2nd Romanian Army. On 21 June, while on a mission over Târgu Ocna, he shot down a Hansa-Brandenburg C.I of FliK 39 flown by Augustin Novak and Karl Lukats, the victory was shared with Sergeant (Sgt.) Nicolae Mănescu. He would shoot down Novak again, on 8 July, (Note: Second source gives the date of 7 July.) while on a mission with Cpt. René Chambe over Dărmănești. This time, Mihăilescu was the one who delivered the coup de grâce. During the battle, Novak's observer, Franz Fritos von Felsöbenced, lost his life, the aircraft crashing near Bergy Magyaros.

On 9 August 1917, while escorting the Farman F.40 flown by French Sgt. de Triquerville and Slt. Dumitru Bădulescu, he engaged and shot down the Oeffag C.II no. 52.63 of FliK 31, flown by Zugsführer Adolf Rabel and observer Oberleutnant Franz Xaver Schlarbaum. The Austro-Hungarian aircraft crash-landed in no man's land, closer to the Romanian trenches, Schlarbaum being rescued from the wreck of the aircraft by Bădulescu and de Triquerville.

Mihăilescu scored his last non-shared victory over a German DFW on 21 August. On 7 September, he carried out 8 combat missions together with Ioan Georgescu and Paul Urechescu (who recently joined the squadron), totaling 11 hours of flight time. During these missions, the pilots of N.1 squadron engaged 5 Austro-Hungarian KD fighters.

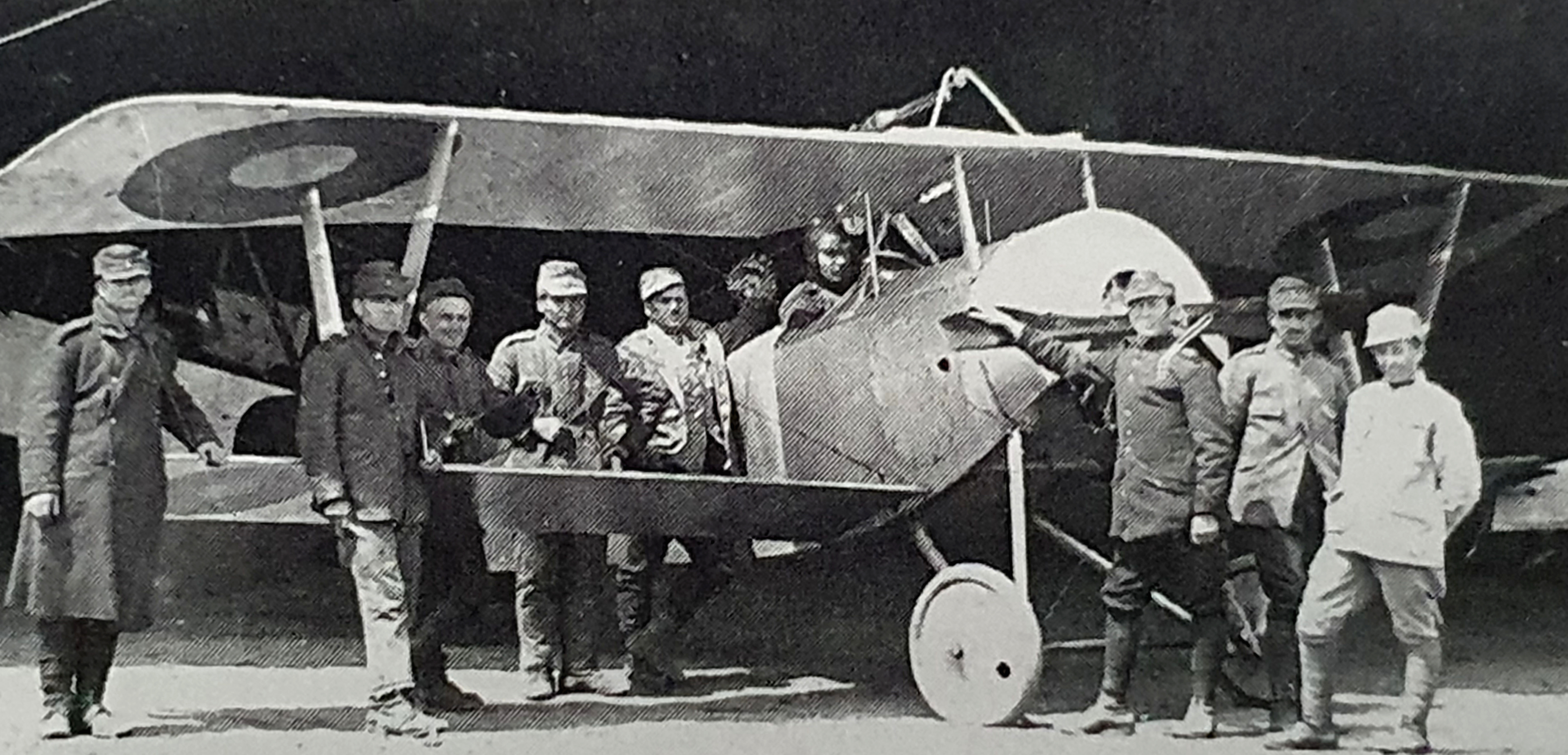
Mihăilescu in the cockpit of a Nieuport 11 fighter, together with other airmen of the N.1 squadron

After the war, on 1 September 1919, he resigned from the military as he felt he had been wronged when he was dismissed from his post as assistant to the commander of Grupul 1 Aeronautic.

The commander of Escadrila N.1, Cpt. Chambe, described him as such:

Mr. Navy Lieutenant Mihăilescu Gheorghe, assigned to Grupul 1 Aeronautic - Escadrila N.1, is an officer-pilot of great courage, above all. He distinguished himself many times during the battles from the summer of 1917 with a particular boldness, engaging in more than 20 aerial battles. He was appointed to the post of deputy commander of the squadron, as he was gifted with great qualities of an organizer and fighter pilot. During confrontations with enemy aircraft, he always showed great bravery and courage, carrying out dangerous missions. Not infrequently he returned from combat with his aircraft riddled with enemy bullets, but each time he emerged victorious.

== Air victories ==
Mihăilescu scored eight victories during the war, including four shared with other pilots, so not counted by Romanian standards.

No.	Date/time	Aircraft	Foe	Result	Location	Notes
1	22 January [O.S. 9 January] 1917	Nieuport fighter	German reconnaissance airplane	Crashed behind enemy lines	Over the front of the 2nd Romanian Army	Crashed aircraft photographed by a Farman F.40 of Escadrila F.6
2 (shared)	21 June [O.S. 8 June] 1917	Nieuport 11 No. 1418	Hansa-Brandenburg C.I of FliK 39	Crashed behind enemy lines	Over Târgu Ocna	Enemy aircraft flown by Augustin Novak and Karl Lukats; Victory shared with Sgt. Nicolae Mănescu
3 (shared)	30 June [O.S. 17 June] 1917	Nieuport fighter	German LVG	Landed behind Romanian lines	Over Cota 1000	Enemy crew taken prisoner; Victory shared with Slt. Gheorghe Gheorghiu
4	8 July [O.S. 25 June] 1917	Nieuport fighter	Hansa-Brandenburg C.I serial number 67.52 of FliK 39	Crashed near Bergy Magyaros	Over Dărmănești	Enemy aircraft flown by Augustin Novak and Franz Fritos von Felsöbenced; von Felsöbenced lost his life
5	9 August [O.S. 27 July] 1917	Nieuport 11 No. 1418	Oeffag C.II s/n 52.63 of FliK 31	Crash-landed in no man's land	Near Cota 408, south of Grozești	Enemy aircraft flown by Adolf Rabel and Franz Xaver Schlarbaum; Rabel died, Schlarbaum taken prisoner
6	21 August [O.S. 8 August] 1917	Nieuport fighter	German DFW	Forced to land	Near Zăbrăuți	Enemy crew taken prisoner
7 (shared)	23 September [O.S. 10 September] 1917	Nieuport fighter	Hansa-Brandenburg C.I s/n 269.26 of FliK 36	Forced to land	Over Târgu Ocna	Enemy crew taken prisoner; Victory shared with Sgt. Nicolae Mănescu
8 (shared)	1 October [O.S. 18 September] 1917	Nieuport fighter	Hansa-Brandenburg C.I series 67 of FliK 36	Landed behind Romanian lines		Enemy pilot, Leutnant Soliser, taken prisoner; Victory shared with Sgt. Nicolae Mănescu

== Awards ==
He received the following awards:

- Order of the Star of Romania with Swords, Knight Class
- Order of Saint Anna 2nd Class
- Croix de Guerre

== See also ==
- List of World War I flying aces from Romania
