= UFAG 60.03 =

C.II / 60.03

General information
- Type: Reconnaissance aircraft
- National origin: Austro-Hungarian Empire
- Manufacturer: Ufag
- Designer: Béla Oravecz
- Number built: 1

History
- First flight: July or August 1918
- Developed from: Brandenburg C.I(U)

The Ufag 60.03, prototype for proposed production as the Ufag C.II, was a reconnaissance aircraft of the Austro-Hungarian air forces (Luftstreitskrafte), in the First World War. The C.II fared well in the 1918 C-class trials and production was planned but abandoned with the armistice in November 1918. The sole Ufag 60.03 was offered for sale to the Czecho-Slovakian government in 1920.

== Specifications (60.03) ==
Data from Austro-Hungarian Army Aircraft of World War One

General characteristics

- Crew: 2
- Upper wingspan: 10.3 m (33 ft 10 in)
- Lower wingspan: 9.74 m (31 ft 11 in)
- Wing area: 28.64 m^{2} (308.3 sq ft)
- Empty weight: 750 kg (1,653 lb)
- Gross weight: 1,150 kg (2,535 lb)
- Powerplant: 1 × Hiero 6 6-cylinder water-cooled in-line piston engine, 170 kW (230 hp)
- Propellers: 2-bladed wooden fixed-pitch propeller

Performance

- Time to altitude:

- 1,000 m (3,300 ft) in 4 minutes 45 seconds
- 2,000 m (6,600 ft) in 10 minutes 53 seconds
- 3,000 m (9,800 ft) in 20 minutes 46 seconds
- 4,000 m (13,000 ft) in 31 minutes 14 seconds

Armament

- provision for fixed and flexibly mounted guns as well as light bombs
