= Letov Š-10 =

Czechoslovak biplane trainer

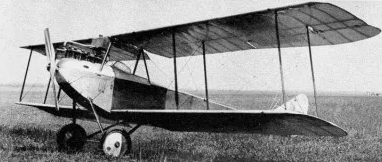
- A Letov Š-10 in an open field

General information
- Role: Trainer aircraft
- National origin: Czechoslovakia
- Manufacturer: Letov Kbely
- Service: Czechoslovak Air Force; Masaryk Aviation League
- Number built: 51

History
- Concluded: November 1936
- Developed from: Hansa-Brandenburg B.I
- Developed into: Letov Š-18
- Successors: Praga E-39

The Letov Š-10 was a biplane trainer aircraft produced in the 1920s by the Czechoslovak company Letov Kbely. It was a licensed copy of the German design Hansa-Brandenburg B.I and could hold two people. The Š-10 served in the Czechoslovak Air Force and later were acquired by aeroclubs and organizations of the Masaryk Aviation League (MLL).

== Origin and development ==
The Letov Š-10 was a licensed copy of the Hansa-Brandenburg B.I series 76, which was widely used by the Austro-Hungarian Aviation Troops. This type of plane was among the most numerous aircraft found in Czechoslovakia after or shortly after independence, and later it was decided to further increase the number of aircraft produced via domestic production. Aero Vodochody created the Aero Ae-10, and in 1922 the production of 51 Š-10s was started at the Letov factory. The Š-10s were equipped with a six-cylinder in-line Mercedes D.I engine, the pistons of whose rear cylinders were excessively flooded with oil when stationary on the ground, which earned the aircraft the nickname "anchovy" or "sardine". Another unofficial nickname for the Ae-10 and Š-10 types was "little firecracker", which they shared with the original Brandenburg B.I.

== Operational history ==
The Š-10 served the Czechoslovak Air Force, along with its related Aero Ae-10 aircraft, as a basic pilot training aircraft. Even though it was soon supplemented by the more modern Š-18, it was not completely replaced in military service until the introduction of the Praga E-39 aircraft in the early 1930s. The Š-10 was characterized by considerable stability, flight safety and overall ease of piloting, which led to its popularity among pilots, but was soon felt to be a certain deficiency, as these features failed to adequately prepare students for piloting more demanding combat aircraft. After being withdrawn from military service in the early 1930s, some of the Š-10s were acquired by aeroclubs and organizations of the Masaryk Aviation League (MLL). The Š-10.1 aircraft, named "Zdena", served at the MLL branch in Nymburk until November 1936.

== Operators ==
- Czechoslovakia
  - Czechoslovak Air Force
  - Masaryk Aviation League

== Specifications ==
=== Technical data ===
- Crew: 2 (instructor and student)
- Span: 12.30 m (40.4 ft)
- Length: 8.40 m (27.6 ft)
- Bearing area: 36.52 m^{2} (393.1 sq ft)
- Empty weight: 668 kg (1,473 lb)
- Takeoff weight: 966 kg (2,130 lb)
- Powerplant: 1 × liquid-cooled six-cylinder in-line Mercedes D.I engine
- Power of the drive unit: 74 kW (100 hp)

=== Performance ===
- Maximum speed: 130 km/h (81 mph)
- Cruising speed: 90 km/h (56 mph)
- Climb capacity: can climb to 1,000 m elevation in 9 minutes and 30 seconds
- Range: 400 km (250 mi)
