= Dumitru Bădulescu =

Romanian ace in World War I (1893–1978)

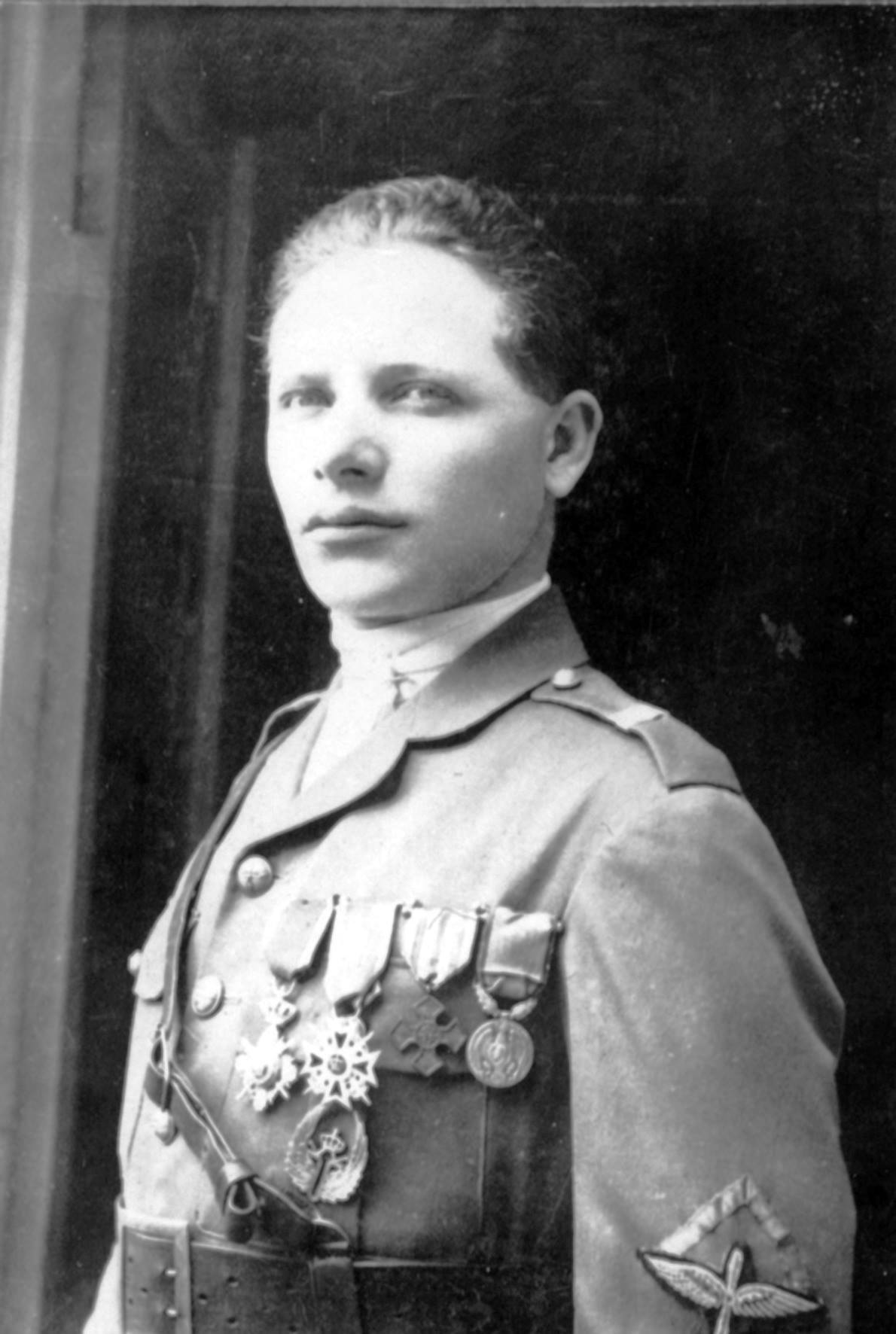
- Dumitru Bădulescu, post-war photo
- Born: Dumitru-Cicerone Bădulescu; 23 March 1893; Pitești, Kingdom of Romania
- Died: 26 March 1978 (aged 85); Romania
- Military career
- Allegiance: Kingdom of Romania
- Branch: Romanian Army (1913-1916; 1920-1931); Romanian Air Corps (1916–1920); Royal Romanian Air Force (1931-1945)
- Service years: 1913-1945 (Note: Post-WWII, the exact year when he was dismissed from the armed forces is unclear.)
- Rank: Colonel
- Units: Regimentul 10 Roșiori (1914); Grupul 2 Escadrile (1916-1917); Escadrila F.6, F.2 (1917-1920); Grupul 3 Aeronautic (1 April-9 June 1917); Batalionul Carelor de Asalt (1920-1931)
- Conflicts: Second Balkan War; First World War; Second World War
- Awards: "Avântul Țării" medal Order of the Crown of Romania; Order of the Star of Romania; Commemorative Cross 1916-1918; Order of the White Lion; Virtutea Aeronautică

Dumitru-Cicerone Bădulescu (23 March 1893 – 26 March 1978) was Romania's only World War I ace. Born in Pitești into a family of career soldiers, after graduating from high school he attended the Military School for Infantry Officers and was awarded the rank of Sublocotenent. Like many of the young Romanian officers, Bădulescu felt drawn towards the then-fledgling Aviation Corps and applied for transfer. He got his wish in September 1916, when he was assigned to Grupul 2 Escadrile as an observer.

== Early life ==
Bădulescu was born in Pitești, Argeș County on 23 March 1893. He was from a family of career soldiers. After graduating from high school he attended the Military School for Infantry Officers, which he graduated from in 1914, receiving the rank of Sublocotenent (Second Lieutenant).

== Military career ==
In 1913, he participated as a student-Sergeant during the Second Balkan War. From 1914, he served as an administration officer of the 10th Regiment Roșiori, however, after the mobilization of the Romanian Army in 1916, he requested to be transferred to the aviation. On 16 September 1916, he was assigned as an observer to Grupul 2 Escadrile, commanded by Captain (Cpt.) Gheorghe Negrescu. As an air observer he performed reconnaissance as well as interception of enemy aircraft missions, flying with Gheorghe Negrescu and Ioan Peneș. On 20 November 1916, while flying on a mission to intercept some German airplanes that were over Ploiești, Bădulescu together with Gheorghe Negrescu engaged and shot down an enemy aircraft which crashed in flames 400–500 meters away from the railway station and the Romanian airfield.

During the winter of 1916, Dumitru Bădulescu attended the Air Observer School at Bârlad, which he graduated on 12 January 1917. After graduating he flew with the F.2 Squadron, then with the F.6 Squadron. On 28 January, he successfully bombed the Union factory, setting fire to 3 factory halls. From the 23rd of March, Bădulescu joined the F.6 Squadron. During this period he flew almost daily over the front, bringing back photographs and valuable information about enemy troop movements. On 1 April 1917, he was moved to an administrative position within Grupul 3 Aeronautic, however, he would return to the squadron on 9 June.

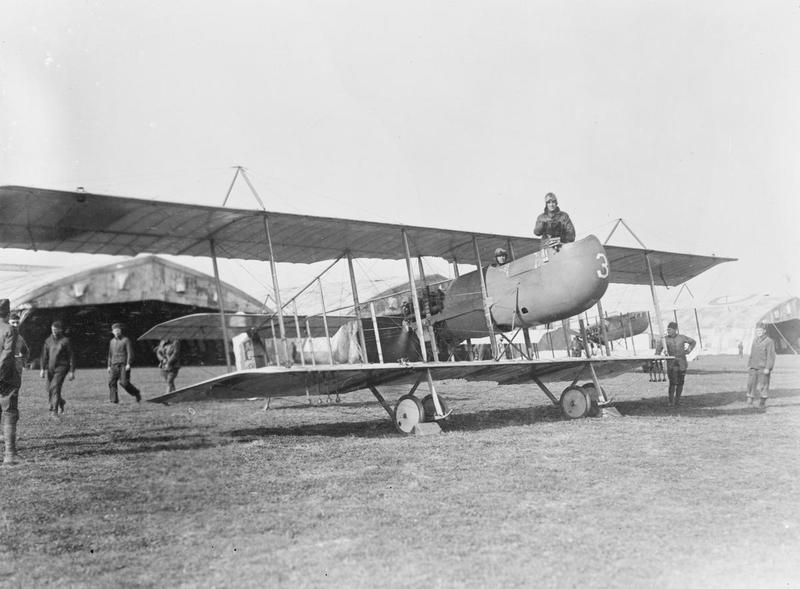
A Farman F.40, like the ones Bădulescu flew on

After his return to Escadrila F.6, he took part in a bombing raid on the "Carpați" factory, his aircraft being hit by anti-aircraft shrapnel. On 24 June, he received his observer brevet, no. 78/24 June 1917. On 27 June 1917, while flying on a Farman F.40 together with Lieutenant (Lt.) Petre Ioanin, they were attacked by a Hansa-Brandenburg C.I over the Mărăști – Soveja sector. In his report Bădulescu wrote: "The fighting was going on for about 10 minutes when the enemy plane, badly damaged, fell in the Soveja area. Our crew earned the congratulations of the front commander...". Following this second victory, he was decorated with the Order of the Crown of Romania Knight class. In preparation of the Battle of Mărăști he will bomb the enemy positions in the Momâia Peak - Cota 625 area and direct friendly artillery fire. On 1 August, he obtained his 3rd confirmed air victory, shooting down an observation balloon near Panciu.

=== 9 August 1917 ===
On 9 August 1917, during the Battle of Mărășești, Farman F.40 no. 3236 of the French Sergeant de Triquerville and observer Slt. Dumitru Bădulescu was flying on a reconnaissance mission over the enemy lines of Kézdi-Vásárhely, higher up and somewhere to the right flew Nieuport 11 no. 1418 of Lt. Gheorghe Mihăilescu. At 8:10 in the morning, the two Romanian airplanes arrived over the enemy lines. After photographing the two enemy aerodromes, the Romanian airplanes were returning to base. Close to the Romanian lines, the Farman was attacked by an Austro-Hungarian aircraft, Oeffag C.II no. 52.63 of FliK 31, flown by Zugsführer Adolf Rabel and observer Oberleutnant Franz Xaver Schlarbaum, which was returning from a mission over the Romanian lines. Mihăilescu immediately intervened, diving on the Oeffag, and from several short bursts, set enemy airplane on fire. The Austro-Hungarian aircraft crash-landed in no man's land, closer to the Romanian trenches.

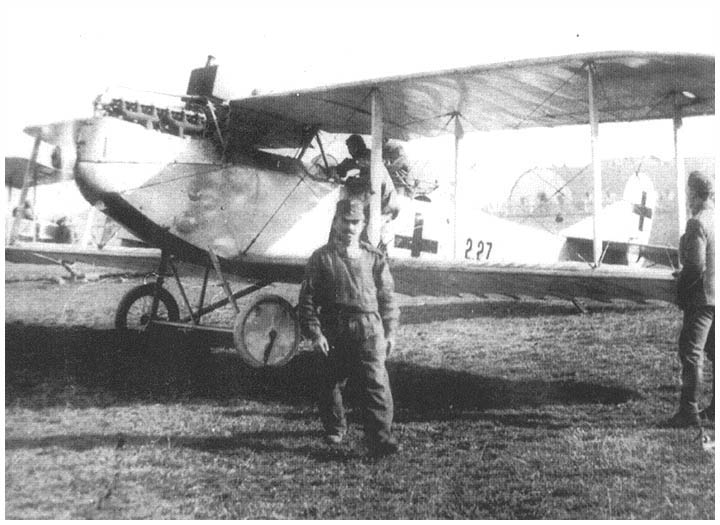
An Oeffag C.II

Bădulescu watched through his binoculars as the enemy aircraft was going down and saw the observer struggling to break free from the burning wreckage. He signaled to his pilot to land as close as possible to the downed Austro-Hungarian airplane. After landing, he got out of the cockpit and pulled the enemy observer out. Moving Schlarbaum to a safer place, Bădulescu returned to the burning aircraft and retrieved the body of the pilot who had died from his wounds. Following this, the two airmen loaded the Austrian observer in the Farman as he couldn't move because of his injured legs, Bădulescu remaining and returning to the Romanian lines. During all this time, no one fired a gun, the infantrymen on both sides of the front being stunned by what had happened between the lines.

The next day, an Austrian Hansa-Brandenburg C.I flew over Onești, where the airfield of the F.6 squadron was located, and dropped a message written in French, reading as follows: "To the Romanian aviators. Gentlemen! On 9 August 1917, one of our airplanes was hit in aerial combat near Cota 408, south of Grozești. After numerous searches, we found the destroyed aircraft and the lifeless body of the pilot, but no trace of the observer, officer Franz Xaver Schlarbaum. Therefore, we have the honor and the request to ask you with deep respect to inform us whether the above-mentioned officer, our comrade, is a prisoner and where he is now. Please attend to him with the utmost care, if he is wounded. With our thanks in advance. An Austro-Hungarian air company."

Schlarbaum had been flown to Iași where the doctors operated on him immediately, saving his legs from amputation. Soon after, Slt. Bădulescu delivered a message to the Austro-Hungarian airfield that contained an account of what happened. Moreover, to dispel any doubts, his message had been doubled by a letter from the wounded man. After a few days of waiting for the Romanian message, during which the German and Austrian anti-aircraft artillery did not engage, the fighting resumed.

As the opportunity arose, Bădulescu and his comrades flew to Iași in order to see how their prisoner was doing, each time bringing him some of their modest rations: cigarettes, sweets, or fruit. At the start of September, Austro-Hungarian airmen dropped another package at Onești. It contained clothes for their wounded comrade, chocolate and a few bottles of champagne for those who saved his life. Schlarbaum returned from captivity on 18 April 1918. After the war, Dumitru Bădulescu kept in touch with the Austrian aviator, the two of them becoming good friends.

On 15 August, Bădulescu's plane came again under attack, he managed to shoot down the enemy plane near the town of Fălticeni, achieving his fourth victory. His last victory of the war came on 21 September 1917. In that morning he had been ordered to take pictures of the Tazlău Valley. At some point, his plane was attacked by a German aircraft and his machine gun jammed. The pilot entered a short dive in order to lose the opponent for a moment while Bădulescu struggled to un-jam the machine gun. When he succeeded, the Farman returned to battle and Bădulescu hit the German aircraft, which crashed in the Romanian lines near Solonț, where the crew was taken prisoner.

He will continue combat missions until the end of the war. In 1918, he executed reconnaissance and bombing missions during the Bessarabian campaign, attacking bolshevik troops at Tiraspol. He left the Air Corps in 1920 and transferred to Batalionul Carelor de Asalt (the Tank Battalion) established at Giurgiu. He returned to the Air Force in 1931, by order of King Carol II. In the autumn of 1939, he went to Germany on an official mission to purchase Heinkel He 112 fighters.

After the Second World War, he was sentenced to 2 years and 8 months of hard labor by the communist authorities. He died on 26 March 1978.

== Air victories ==
Dumitru Bădulescu scored 5 confirmed and 3 unconfirmed victories during the war:

- 20 November [O.S. 7 November] 1916 - A German aircraft over Ploiești while flying with Cpt. Gheorghe Negrescu.
- 25 June [O.S. 12 June] 1917 - unconfirmed.
- 27 June [O.S. 14 June] 1917 - An Austro-Hungarian Hansa-Brandenburg C.I over the Mărăști – Soveja area, flying with Lt. Petre Ioanin.
- 30 July [O.S. 17 July] 1917 - unconfirmed.
- 1 August [O.S. 19 July] 1917 - A German observation balloon over Panciu, flying with Petre Ioanin.
- 15 August [O.S. 2 August] 1917 - An Austro-Hungarian aircraft in the Fălticeni area, flying with Petre Ioanin.
- 10 September [O.S. 28 August] 1917 - unconfirmed.
- 21 September [O.S. 8 September] 1917 - An enemy aircraft near Solonț, flying with Plutonier Nicolae Cicei.

== Awards ==
=== Romania ===
- "Avântul Țării" medal - 1913
- Order of the Crown of Romania Knight class - 27 June 1917
- Order of the Star of Romania Knight class - 1918
- Order of the Crown of Romania Officer class - 1919
- Commemorative Cross 1916-1918 - January 1920
- Order of Aeronautical Virtue Gold Cross and Officer class - 1930

=== Czechoslovakia ===
- Order of the White Lion - 1920s

Although nominated twice to be awarded the Order of Michael the Brave 3rd Class, for unknown reasons, he did not receive the order.

== See also ==
- List of World War I flying aces from Romania
