= Andreas Dombrowski =

Austro-Hungarian flying ace

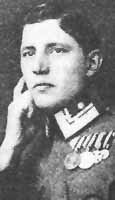
- Born: 30 November 1894; Mahrisch-Ostrau, Austro-Hungary (presently the Czech Republic)
- Died: Unknown
- Military career
- Allegiance: Austro-Hungarian Empire
- Branch: Aviation
- Rank: Feldwebel
- Units: Flik 29, Flik 68J
- Awards: Gold Medal for Bravery; Silver Medal for Bravery; Prussian War Merit Medal

Feldwebel Andreas Dombrowski (born November 30, 1894, date of death unknown) was an Austro-Hungarian World War I flying ace credited with six aerial victories scored on three different fronts. He was conscripted into the Austro-Hungarian military in 1915. Dombrowski underwent pilot's training, gaining his license in June 1916. Posted to the Russian Front during the Brusilov Offensive to fly reconnaissance, he was credited with his first victory on 17 August 1916. In September, 1916 he was transferred to the Romanian Front. Still flying a reconnaissance aircraft, he fought four more successful engagements during 1917, becoming an ace. Transferred to the Italian Front in April 1918, he flew an Albatros D.III for his former observer, Karl Patzelt. On 4 May 1918, Dombrowski scored his sixth and final victory, then took a bullet to the face and crashlanded. Once healed, he went to a photographic reconnaissance unit for the rest of the war.

== Biography ==
=== Early life ===
Andreas Domorowski was born in Mahrisch-Ostrau, in the present day Czech Republic, on 30 November 1894. He was of Sudeten German heritage.

=== Russian Front service ===
See also Aerial victory standards of World War I

In 1915, he was conscripted into the Austro-Hungarian military and volunteered for aerial service as soon as he finished recruit training. He had a natural talent for flying. When he completed pilot's training in June 1916 by earning Austrian Pilot's Certificate No. 382, he was posted to Flik 29. This squadron operated Hansa-Brandenburg C.I two-seater reconnaissance craft on the Russian Front. Dombrowski arrived at a time of vigorous aerial activity linked to the Brusilov Offensive.

On 17 August 1916, he and his observer were credited with driving down a two-seater Voisin aircraft in a ten minute fight during which Dombrowski outflew his opponent while his observer manned the machine gun.

=== Service on the Romanian Front ===
Flik 29 then transferred to the Romanian Front in late September 1916. There the Austro-Hungarians faced formidable opponents. The Romanian and French pilots were reinforced by Russian squadrons, which were equipped with Anatra reconnaissance airplanes and recent model SPADs. Despite this bitter opposition, Dombrowski excelled at long range reconnaissance and photographic missions, conducted effective artillery direction missions, and bombed the enemy in his Hansa-Brandenburg C.I. He soon became so highly regarded as a pilot that officers vied with one another to fly with him. (Note: In Austro-Hungarian two-seater aviation, the observer was an officer who was supposed to direct his pilot like he was a chauffeur.)

In his normal course of flying, Dombrowski was bound to clash with his enemies. On 5 February 1917, with Karl Patzelt flying in the rear seat, the Austro-Hungarian air crew was attacked by an enemy Nieuport. They forced it to land in a ravine in enemy-held territory, west of Comănești.

Dombrowski flew on into summer. On 13 June 1917, at 0930 hours, he clashed with an intercepting Nieuport fighter. After a short dogfight, the Nieuport was forced to land northwest of Onești.

Eight days later, on 21 June 1917, with Karl Patzelt once again in Domborwski's rear seat, they engaged another Nieuport fighter. This one was shot down to crash in a forest north of Borșani.

On 10 July 1917, Dombrowski flew a mission with an observer who usually manned an observation balloon's gondola. The pair came across a "three-engined large aircraft" and shot it down into enemy territory near Soveja. It was Andreas Dombrowski's fifth aerial victory.

Dombrowski's heroic feats had not gone unrewarded. He had received both the Silver and Gold Medals for Bravery; the latter was the highest award available for a noncommissioned officer. The Prussians also bestowed a War Merit Medal on him. (Note: Not the Nazi War Merit Medal of World War II.)

=== The Italian Front ===
In April 1918, Dombrowski transferred again, this time to fly fighters with Flik 68J in northern Italy. His commanding officer there was his former observer, Karl Patzelt. They were out on a late morning squadron patrol on 4 May 1918 when they were attacked by two flights of Sopwith Camels. Dombrowski used his Albatros D.III's machine guns to light a Camel afire in midair. When he returned to the dogfight, he took a bullet to the face that forced him to crashland. Patzelt and another Austro-Hungarian pilot were killed in action during the fight.

After his recovery, Dombrowski went to a photo reconnaissance unit, Flik 57Rb, which flew two-seater Phönix C.Is in addition to Hansa-Brandenburg C.Is. He proved to be quite talented in using specialized airborne cameras for photographic mapping. Dombrowski would fly with Flik 57Rb until war's end. He then vanished into obscurity.
