= Augustin Novák =

Czech World War I flying ace

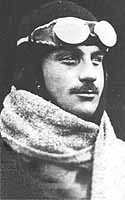
- Born: 1890; Butovice, Moravia, Austria-Hungary
- Died: 1970 (aged 79–80)
- Military career
- Allegiance: Austria-Hungary
- Branch: Horse artillery, then flying service
- Service years: 1911–1918
- Rank: Feldwebel
- Units: Flik 30, Flik 13, Flik 39
- Awards: Silver awards of Medal for Bravery (2 First Class, 1 Second Class)

Augustin Novák (sometimes referred to as Novak or Nowak; 1890–1970) was a Czech World War I flying ace credited with five or seven aerial victories. A prewar soldier, who had joined the horse artillery in 1911, he participated in the early Battle of Krasnik against the Russians, winning a Silver Medal for Bravery. After transferring to aviation service in January 1916, he became a two-seater pilot on the Russian, Romanian, and Italian Fronts. His aerial victories earned him two more awards of the Medal for Bravery, both First Class. He was then removed from combat to become an instructor in January 1918.

== Early life ==
Augustin Novák was born in Butovice, Moravia, Austria-Hungary (today part of Studénka, Czech Republic) in 1890.

== Service in the artillery ==
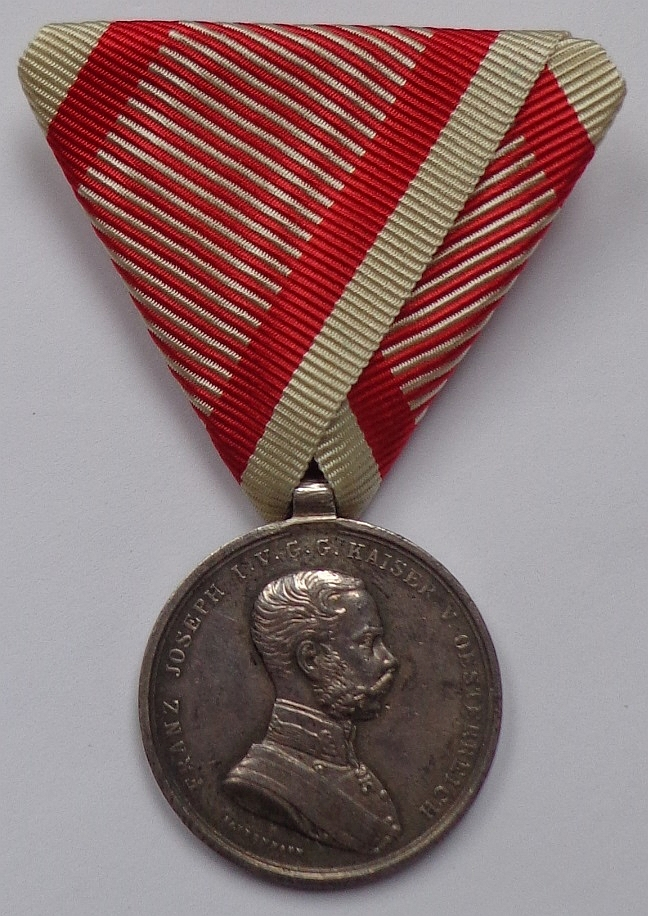
Silver Medal for Bravery, Second Class

Novák joined the horse artillery in 1911. When World War I began, his unit went into action on the Russian Front. At the Battle of Krasnik, he won the Silver Medal for Bravery, 2nd Class.

== Aviation service ==
In January 1916, Novák voluntarily transferred to aviation service. Once trained as a pilot, he received Austrian Pilot Certificate No. 389 on 13 July 1916. He then returned to the Russian Front to fly for Flik 30 in the Carpathian Mountains. The squadron would soon shift to a different airfield. During this transfer, on 12 August 1916, he crashed a two-seater Lloyd C.III with an observer aboard, hospitalizing both of them. Upon Novák's return to duty, none of the unit's observers would fly with him.

He was then transferred to Flik 13 in Romania. There he flew bombing raids in a Hansa-Brandenburg C.I. On the morning of 27 December 1916, Novák was credited with a confirmed victory over a Farman at 1120 hours; on his afternoon patrol, he was credited with two more, at 1515 and 1520 hours. He was awarded the silver medal for Bravery, First Class.

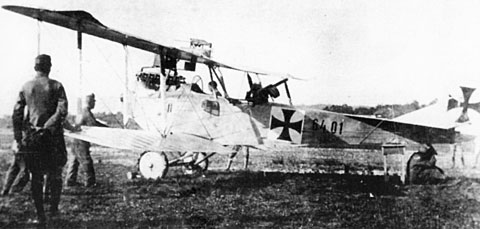
A Hansa Brandenburg C.I

He was immediately transferred to Flik 39, which was posted at Csíkszereda. On 1 June 1917, he posted a combat claim for an unconfirmed victory over another Farman. On the 21st, he scored his fourth confirmed win, yet another Farman, himself being shot down on the same day. On 8 July, he survived being shot down again, this time by Lieutenant Gheorghe Mihăilescu; his observer was killed, while he was injured. In August, he won his second silver medal for Bravery, First Class. When his unit was shifted to northern Italy to fight in the Battle of Caporetto, he scored his fifth aerial victory, shooting down an Italian SAML S2 reconnaissance craft on 11 November 1917.

In late January 1918, Novák's combat career ended. He was posted to the rear as an instructor.

== Sources ==
- Franks, Norman; Guest, Russell; Alegi, Gregory (1997). Above the War Fronts: The British Two-seater Bomber Pilot and Observer Aces, the British Two-seater Fighter Observer Aces, and the Belgian, Italian, Austro-Hungarian and Russian Fighter Aces, 1914–1918. Grub Street. ISBN 978-1898697565.
- O'Connor, Martin (1994). Air Aces of the Austro-Hungarian Empire 1914 - 1918. Flying Machines Press. ISBN 978-0-9637110-1-4.
