= Karl Teichmann =

Austrian flying ace (1897–1927)

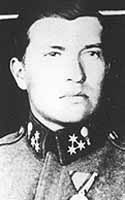
- Born: 1897; Rabersdorf, Silesia, Austro-Hungarian Empire
- Died: 1927 (aged 29–30); Graz, Austria
- Military career
- Allegiance: Austro-Hungarian Empire
- Branch: Austro-Hungarian Army: Infantry; Aviation
- Service years: 1915 - 1918
- Rank: Feldwebel
- Units: Fliegerkompanie 5 Fliegerkompanie 42J; Fliegerkompanie 60J; Fliegerkompanie 14J
- Conflicts: World War I
- Awards: Golden Medal for Bravery; Silver Medal for Bravery x2

Feldwebel Karl Teichmann (1897–1927) was an Austro-Hungarian World War I flying ace credited with five aerial victories. His path to aerial victories began in 1915, when he joined the Austro-Hungarian infantry. His prewar training as an auto mechanic saw him assigned as an aviation mechanic on the Russian Front in February 1916. After eight months, he began pilot training, being awarded Austrian Pilot's Certificate 658 on 16 May 1917. Reassigned to the Italian Front, he scored five victories—three shared—between 26 September 1917 and 22 August 1918. Teichmann would survive the war and die of natural causes in Graz, Austria.

== Biography ==
=== Early life ===
Karl Teichmann was born in Rabersdorf, Schlesien, the Austro-Hungarian Empire in 1897. He was of Sudeten German heritage. He trained as an automotive mechanic in his youth before World War I.

Teichmann joined Infantry Regiment No. 1 in 1915, but soon after basic training found himself forwarded to Fliegerkompanie 5. He served as a mechanic on the Russian Front, beginning in February 1916. Eight months later, he applied for pilot's training; he was accepted in November 1916. His talent as a pilot got him sent directly to advanced training as a fighter pilot. On 16 May 1917, he was awarded Austrian Pilot's Certificate 659.

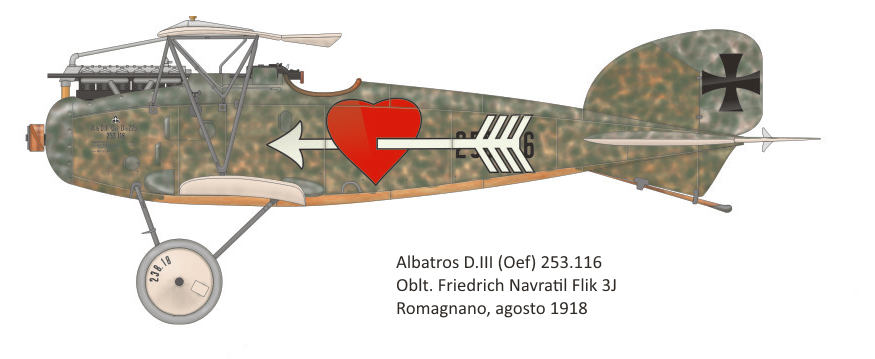
Typical Austro-Hungarian Albatros D.III. Arrow-in-heart insignia is that of Miroslav Navratil.

=== Aerial combat ===
In August 1917, Teichmann was posted to Fliegerkompanie 42J, considered the cream of the Austro-Hungarian fighter squadrons. It was armed with Albatros D.III fighters. On 26 September 1917, in company with Ernst Strohschneider and Ferdinand Udvardy, he helped shoot down a SPAD over Ronchi for his first aerial victory. He then received the Silver Medal for Bravery Second Class.

Teichmann was drawn into the fighting at the Battle of Caporetto. On 23 October 1917, he scored another victory, downing a Nieuport fighter over Lago di Doberdò. On 27 November, he teamed with Karl Patzelt for a third victory, a Sopwith destroyed over San Dona di Piave. His feats earned him the First Class Silver Bravery Medal.

Teichmann then transferred to a new fighter squadron being founded with Frank Linke-Crawford commanding, Fliegerkompanie 60 J. On 3 February 1918, he shot down another Nieuport, over Monte Nuoval. Later in 1918, he was granted the highest honor of his nation, the Gold Medal for Bravery. In August 1918, he moved to Fliegerkompanie 14j at Feltre. On 22 August, he scored his fifth victory by shooting down a Bristol F.2 Fighter from No. 139 Squadron RAF.

Karl Teichmann survived the war. He died of natural causes in Graz in 1927.
