= Hansa-Brandenburg C.II =

General information
- Type: Reconnaissance aircraft
- Manufacturer: Hansa-Brandenburg
- Designer: Ernst Heinkel
- Primary user: Austro-Hungarian Imperial and Royal Aviation Troops
- Number built: 2

The Hansa-Brandenburg C.II, company designation K, (Luftfahrtruppen (LFT) series 66.5, 66.8 and 67.5), was a two-seat reconnaissance aircraft built in Germany by Hansa-Brandenburg in World War I, powered by Mercedes D.III or Hiero 6 water-cooled in-line piston engines.

== Design and development ==
The C.II was derived from the earlier Brandenburg KDD prototype, (LFT serial 60.56), and two batches were ordered by the LFT, as the Mercedes D.III powered series 66.5 and Hiero 6 powered series 67.5., in 1916. The 67.5 aircraft were re-serialled in the 66.8 range, but the production contract with Brandenburg was cancelled in November 1916, as the LFT and Austro-Hungarian air ministry preferred production by in-house companies like UFAG and Phönix, which, nevertheless, developed their own designs.

The C.II prototypes followed contemporary Brnadenburg practice with a deep fuselage and a semicircular tailplane sitting on top of the rear fuselage. The characteristic 'Star' or 'Pyramid' wing strut arrangement, consisted of four pairs of V struts attached to the mainplanes at the roots and at 3/4 span converging to a point in the middle of the wing cellule. Unlike the KDD the C.II fuselage did not fill the interplane gap but the pilot was still sat under the centre-section with difficult ingress and egress, particularly in case of an accident. Controls and undercarriage were all conventional with wooden framed fabric-covered control surfaces and tail-skid undercarriage.

== Operational history ==
Two prototypes were built, (66.51 and 66.81), with 66.51 flying in October 1916 and 66.81 flying in June 1917. Flight tests revealed poor longitudinal stability, high landing speed, poor glide ratio and relatively slow climb rate. After testing both prototypes were stored at Aspern until the Armistice and further development was abandoned due to the superiority of the Phönix C.I and UFAG C.I.

== Specifications (66.51) ==
Data from

General characteristics

- Crew: 2
- Length: 7.4 m (24 ft 3 in)
- Wingspan: 9.4 m (30 ft 10 in)
- Wing area: 28.03 m^{2} (301.7 sq ft)
- Empty weight: 728 kg (1,605 lb)
- Gross weight: 1,092 kg (2,407 lb)
- Powerplant: 1 × Mercedes D.III 6-cylinder water-cooled in-line piston engine, 120 kW (160 hp)
- Propellers: 2-bladed wooden fixed-pitch propeller

Performance

- Time to altitude: 1,000 m (3,300 ft) in 3 minutes 30 seconds

Armament

- Guns: provision for flexible machinegun or guns in the rear cockpit and provision for a fixed forward firing machine gun in a pod over the centre-section firing outside the propeller arc.
