= Aero A.14 =

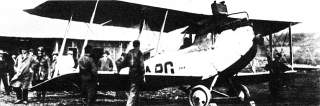

General information
- Type: Reconnaissance aircraft Airliner/mail plane
- Manufacturer: Aero Vodochody
- Status: Retired
- Primary users: Czechoslovak Air Force Czech Airlines

History
- Manufactured: 1920s

The Aero A.14 was a Czechoslovak biplane military reconnaissance aircraft built in the 1920s. It was essentially a slightly modified version of the Hansa-Brandenburg C.I aircraft, widely-used by Austria-Hungary during the First World War, and for this reason, the aircraft is sometimes referred to as the A.14 Brandenburg. When equipped with a slightly different engine (the Hiero L in place of the standard Hiero N), the aircraft was designated A.15 instead. The two versions were otherwise almost identical.

Even though it was obsolete by the time it entered production in 1922, the A.14 is nevertheless noteworthy for its role in the establishment of Czech airline CSA. A.14s provided by the Czechoslovak Air Force served to survey routes that CSA airliners would soon fly, and at least 17 were put into service as mail planes between Prague and Bratislava. They could also carry a single passenger when required.

== Development and design ==
The Hansa-Brandenburg C.I was an Austro-Hungarian reconnaissance aircraft that was designed by Ernst Heinkel as a development of the earlier Hansa-Brandenburg B.I. It was built in large numbers by three manufacturers (Hansa-Brandenburg, Phönix Flugzeug-Werke and Ufag), with 1258 aircraft delivered by 31 October 1918, after which reliable delivery records are not available.

The Hansa-Brandenburg C.I was one of the first aircraft types to be operated by the newly formed Czechoslovak Air Force, with some aircraft being flown to Czechoslovak airfields at the end of World War One and the dissolution of the Austro-Hungarian Empire, and others being rebuilt from damaged examples found in factories and warehouses. By November 1919, the Czechoslovak Air Force had 46 airworthy C.Is, and in 1920 it purchased another 15 surplus machines from Austria, although further deliveries from that source were stopped by the Inter-Allied Commission that monitored the terms of the Treaty of Saint-Germain-en-Laye, the peace treaty that ended the state of war between the Allies of World War I and Austria.

The Hansa-Brandenburg proved popular in Czechoslovak service, with the type being easy to fly and maintain, and even when the faster Letov Š-1 reconnaissance aircraft entered service, the C.I remained in use for photo-reconnaissance and as an advanced trainer. As a result, the Czechoslovak Ministry of Defence decided to order production of the C.I under license in Czechoslovakia, with Aero Vodochody being ordered to build three different versions of the Hansa-Brandenburg, the Aero A.14 and A.15, both powered by the Hiero 6 engine rated at 172 kW (231 hp), and the Aero A.26, powered by 138 kW (185 hp) BMW IIIa engines. (Note: The Hansa-Brandenburg B.I was also produced under license in Czechoslovakia, by Aero as the Aero Ae 01 and by Letov as the Š-10.) Both Hiero-powered variants were based on the Ufag-built C.I(U) series 369, while the less powerful Aero A.26 was based on the Phönix-built C.I(Ph) Series 26. A total of 25 A.14s and 24 A.15s were ordered in 1922, with five A.14s fitted with dual controls.

The A.14 and A.15 were two-bay biplanes of conventional construction. The fuselage had a wooden framework with plywood covering, while the wings had a wooden structure with fabric covering, with steel-tube interplane struts with wooden fairings. The tail surfaces were built of steel tubing with fabric covering. The A.14 was powered by a Hiero N engine, new-built by Breltfeld and Danĕk of Prague, while the A.15 used imported Hiero L engines. Both types were designed to carry armament, but in practice, the A.14, used as a trainer and transport, was unarmed. The A.15 was fitted with a fixed forward firing synchronised 7.7 mm (.303 in) Vickers machine gun, while a flexibly-mounted Lewis gun of the same calibre was fitted in the observer's position. Bombs could be carried under the wings, with 12 10 kg (22 lb) to 20 kg (44 lb) bombs or two 50 kg (110 lb) bombs carried.

The Czechoslovak aircraft had a modified wing structure compared to the original Hansa-Brandenburg C.I on which it was based, with more wing ribs, while the A.14s were fitted with revised controls, using a joystick rather than a control wheel, but the A.15 reverted to the original controls.

== Operational history ==
The first A.14 was accepted by the Czechoslovak authorities on 25 October 1922, with deliveries continuing into December that year. Because of the Czechoslovak Air Force's urgent need for new pilots, the A.14s were used as trainers, and the intended armament was not fitted. The A.15s were delivered from March to August 1923, and were used for several roles within the Czechoslovak Air Force's frontline units, including reconnaissance, bombing, artillery direction and as an intermediate trainer. Some A.15s were modified for night flying, with modified cockpit lighting added, landing lights fitted and extended exhaust pipes to avoid blinding the crew, and were designated Ab.15. A.15s were also used in trials of spraying against Black arches (also known as Nun moths), an early example of crop dusting.

The Aero A.14 suffered from excessive engine vibration, and served for a relatively short time with the Czechoslovak Air Force, with aircraft being transferred to the military transport group for evaluation, starting flying airmail trials in March 1923 between Prague and Bratislava in March 1923. The A.15 had a much longer career in front line service, serving until about 1930, when the deteriorating physical condition of the aircraft led them to be withdrawn from use and sold to civil users such as flying clubs.

The airmail trials carried out by the Czechoslovak Air Force in March–April 1923, which mainly used A.14s carrying civilian markings and registrations, were intended as proving flights to support the establishment of a state-owned civil airline. These plans were realised with the establishment of Československé státní aerolinie (ČSA) on 28 October 1923. Amongst the airline's initial equipment were 17 Aero A.14s loaned by the Czechoslovak military. These were used to fly the airline's first services, between Prague and Bratislava, on 29 October 1923. In 1924 and 1925, A-14s were responsible for almost all of ČSA's services, flying over 90% of flights. Six A-14s were modified to carry two passengers, who sat facing each other, and these six aircraft were preferred for regular operations, with the single passenger aircraft being held in reserve. From 1926, de Havilland DH.50s (licence-built by Aero) took over ČSA's main routes, with the A.14 relegated to reserve aircraft, with ČSA returning its last A.14 to the Czechoslovak Air Force in 1927.

A.14s and A.15s remained in private use well into the 1930s, with the last aircraft removed from the register in 1936.

== Specifications (A.14) ==
Data from Monografie: Aero A-14, A-15

General characteristics

- Crew: 2
- Length: 8.40 m (27 ft 7 in)
- Upper wingspan: 12.30 m (40 ft 4 in)
- Lower wingspan: 11.75 m (38 ft 7 in)
- Height: 3.13 m (10 ft 3 in)
- Wing area: 37.50 m^{2} (403.6 sq ft)
- Empty weight: 933 kg (2,057 lb)
- Gross weight: 1,275 kg (2,811 lb)
- Fuel capacity: 250 L (66 US gal; 55 imp gal) main tank plus 25 L (6.6 US gal; 5.5 imp gal) reserve
- Powerplant: 1 × Breitfeld & Daněk Hiero N 6-cyl water-cooled in-line piston engine, 169 kW (227 hp)
- Propellers: 2-bladed wooden fixed pitch propeller, 2.80 m (9 ft 2 in) diameter

Performance

- Maximum speed: 179 km/h (111 mph, 97 kn)
- Cruise speed: 150 km/h (93 mph, 81 kn)
- Range: 425 km (264 mi, 229 nmi)
- Endurance: 2.6 hr
- Service ceiling: 4,900 m (16,100 ft)
- Time to altitude:
  - 4 min 45 sec to 1,000 m (3,300 ft)
  - 36 minutes to 4,000 m (13,000 ft)
- Wing loading: 34 kg/m^{2} (7.0 lb/sq ft)
- Power/mass: 0.130 kW/kg (0.08 hp/lb)

== Operators ==
- Czechoslovak Air Force
- ČSA

== See also ==
Related development

- Aero A.26
- Hansa-Brandenburg B.I

Related lists

- List of interwar military aircraft
