= Friedrichshafen FF.21 =

Single-engined German multirole flying boat, 1914

FF.21

General information
- Type: Flying boat
- Manufacturer: Flugzeugbau Friedrichshafen
- Number built: 1

History
- First flight: July 1914
- Developed from: Friedrichshafen FF.11

The Friedrichshafen FF.21 was a German biplane flying boat built by the Friedrichshafen Aircraft Company (Flugzeugbau Friedrichshafen) in 1914 for an aircraft competition that was cancelled when the First World War began. Its fate is unknown.

== Design and description ==
The FF.21 was designed by Paul Jaray as an improved version of the FF.11 intended to compete in the 1914 Baltic Seaplane Competition (Ostsee-Flugwetterbewerb 1914), but the competition was cancelled when the war began in August. The aircraft's hull was built by the Oertz yacht company in its Hamburg factory on the Reiherstieg as had the FF.11's hull and was clearly derived from a motorboat. The aircraft's two-bay wings were arranged in a sesquiplane configuration. Two open-frame booms extended aft from the wings to carry the fabric-covered tail structure. The water-cooled, 150-metric-horsepower (110 kW), Benz Bz.III straight-six piston engine was located at the rear of the hull and drove the wooden, fixed pitch, four-bladed propeller via a driveshaft and bevel gear in a pusher configuration to keep the propeller above the spray from the hull during landing and take-off.

The aircraft made its first flight in July 1914. Its ultimate fate is uncertain as it is not known to have been taken over by the Imperial German Navy's (Kaiserliche Marine) Naval Air Service (Marine-Fliegerabteilung) when the war began in August as were several other Friedrichshafen aircraft.

== Specifications ==
Data from Flugzeugbau Friedrichshafen GmbH: Diplom-Ingenieur Theodor Kober

General characteristics

- Crew: 2
- Length: 11.5 m (37 ft 9 in)
- Upper wingspan: 16.9 m (55 ft 5 in)
- Lower wingspan: 13.7 m (44 ft 11 in)
- Height: 2.9 m (9 ft 6 in)
- Powerplant: 1 × Benz Bz.III water-cooled 6-cylinder inline piston engine, 110 kW (150 hp)
- Propellers: 4-bladed fixed-pitch wooden propeller

== Bibliography ==
- Borzutzki, Siegfried (1993). Flugzeugbau Friedrichshafen GmbH: Diplom-Ingenieur Theodor Kober [Friedrichshafen Aircraft Company: Diploma-Engineer Theodore Kober] (in German). Berlin: Burbach. ISBN 3-927513-60-1.
- Herris, Jack (2016). Friedrichshafen Aircraft of WWI: A Centennial Perspective on Great War Airplanes. Great War Aviation Centennial Series. Vol. 21. Charleston, South Carolina: Aeronaut Books. ISBN 978-1-935881-35-3.
