= Ufag C.I =

WWI Austria-Hungary military reconnaissance aircraft

UFAG C.I
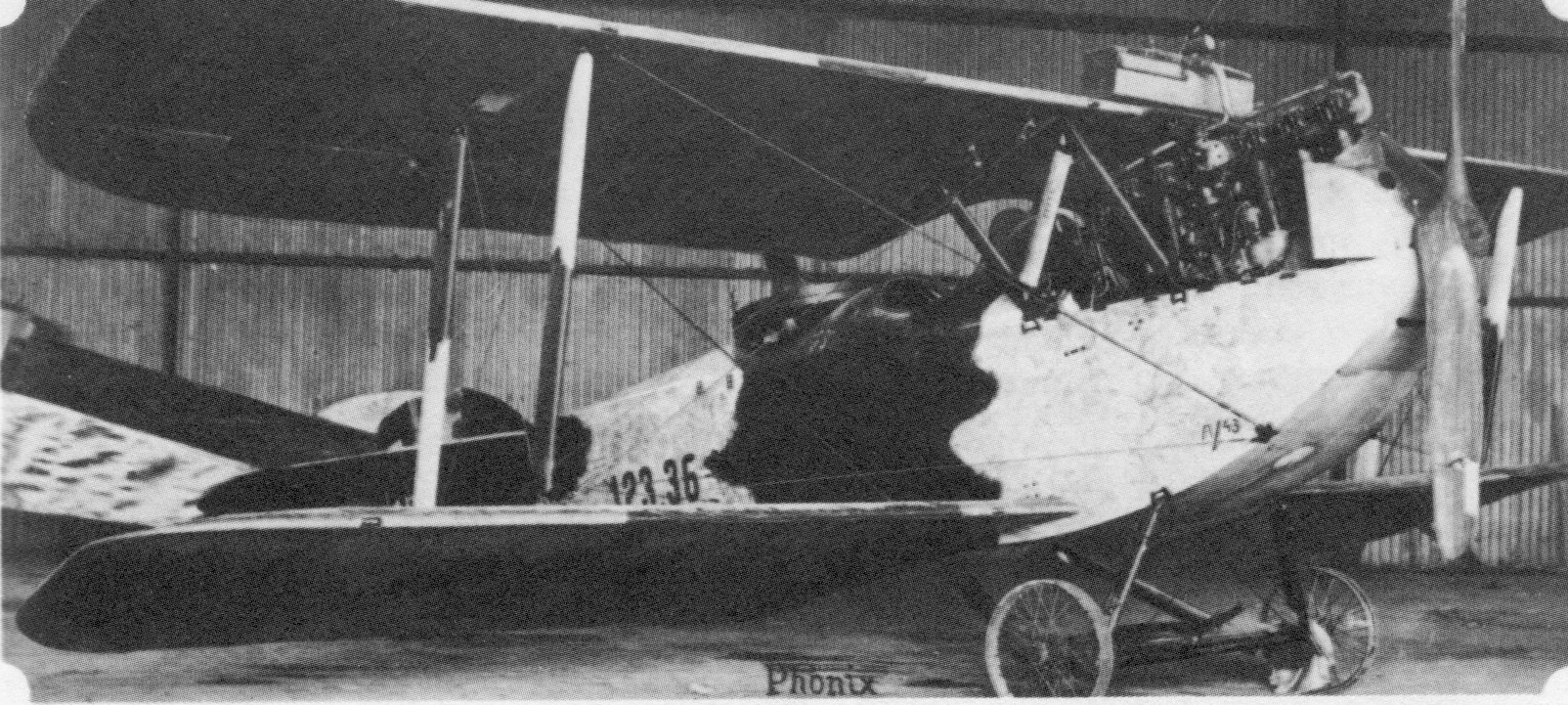
- An UFAG C.I(Ph) (series 123) built by Phönix Flugzeugwerke under license

General information
- Type: Reconnaissance aircraft
- National origin: Austria-Hungary
- Manufacturer: UFAG
- Primary user: KuKLFT
- Number built: 250

History
- Introduction date: 1918
- First flight: April 1918
- Developed from: Brandenburg C.II(U)

The UFAG C.I was a military reconnaissance aircraft produced in the Austro-Hungarian Empire during World War I, by the Ungarische Flugzeugfabrik Abteil Gesellschaft (UFAG) . It was introduced in April 1918, and was widely used on the Italian Front in the final months of World War I.

The UFAG C.I incorporated the best features of the Brandenburg C.II(U) with single-bay wings and 'I' strut inter-plane bracing, which was replaced wing conventional steel-tube interplane struts in production aircraft. More manoeuvrable than the Phönix C.I, the C.I had good performance, but suffered from a few odd handling characteristics.

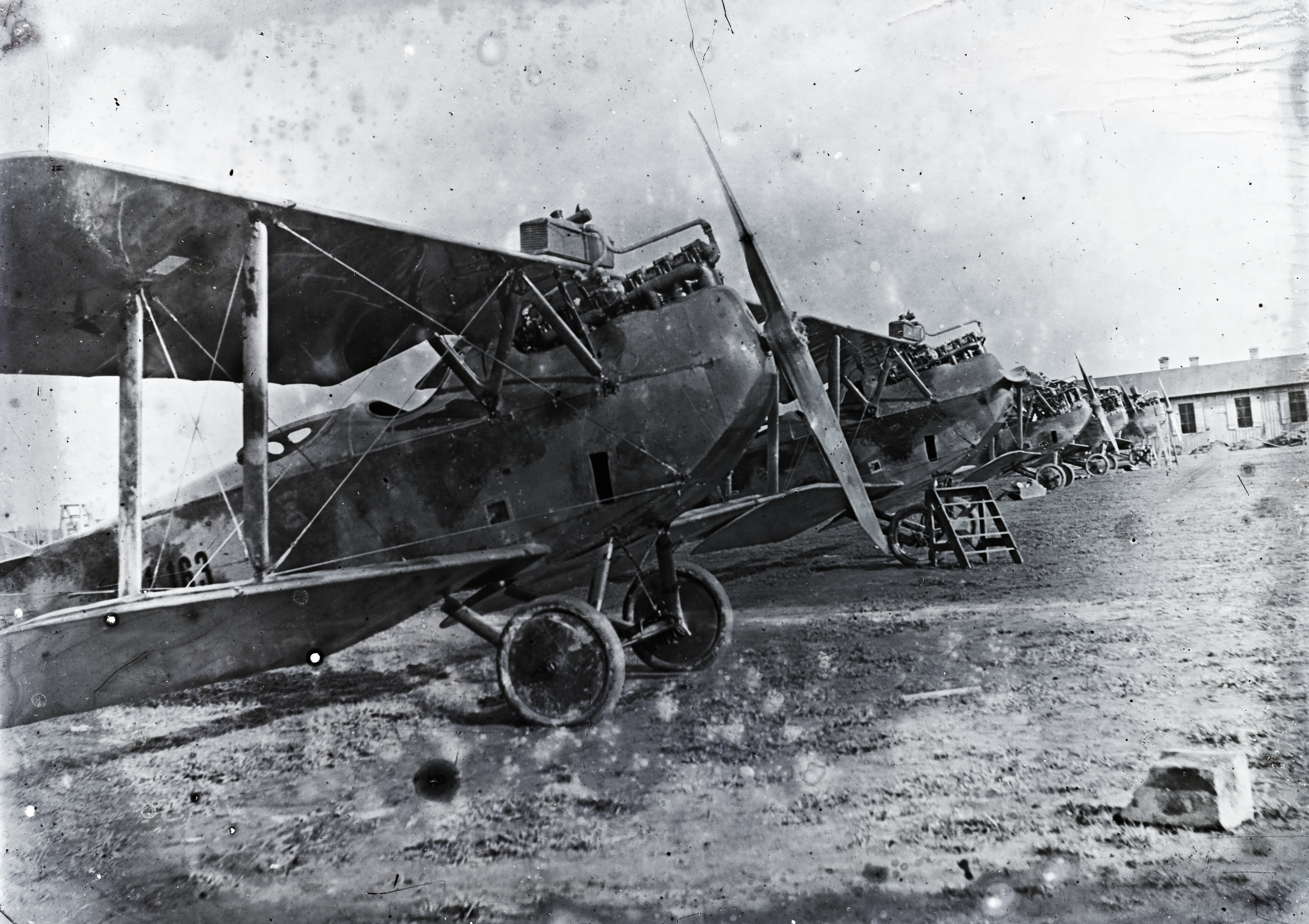
Ufag C.Is in service

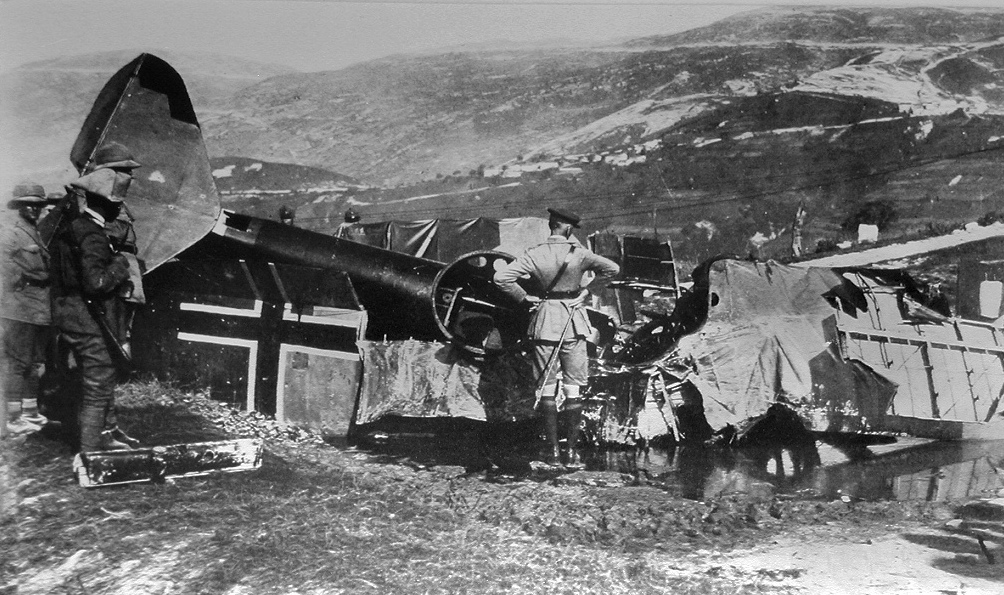
Ufag C.I shot down over Friuli during 1918

Production of the C.I continued after the Armistice by MARE and was also built by the Neuschloss-Lichtig factory as the NL Sportplane.

== Variants ==
Data from:Austro-Hungarian Army Aircraft of World War One

UFAG 161.01
First prototype 8.92 m (29.3 ft) span, 200 hp (150 kW) Hiero 6, 'I' type inter-plane struts.
UFAG 161.02
Second prototype, 230 hp (170 kW) Hiero 6, 'I' type inter-plane struts.
UFAG C.I
(series 161.03 to 161.22) Production by Ufag, 9.12 m (29.9 ft) span, 230 hp (170 kW) Hiero 6, twin inter-plane struts.
UFAG C.I
(series 161.31 to 161.250) Production by Ufag, 9.5 m (31 ft) span, 230 hp (170 kW) Hiero 6, twin inter-plane struts.
UFAG C.I(Ph)
(series 123.01 to 123.40) Production by Phönix, 9.12 m (29.9 ft) span, 230 hp (170 kW) Hiero 6, twin inter-plane struts.
UFAG 60.01
an improved C.I which would evolve into the UFAG 60.03 / C.II.

== Operational history ==
The C.I was widely used by the KuKLFT on the Italian front by at least 30 Fliks. The C.I was also used post WWI by the Hungarian Red Airborne Corps as well as the clandestine Hungarian Legügyi Hivatal. Ex-military C.Is were also converted for civil use and as mailplanes.

Kingdom of Yugoslavia

- Royal Yugoslav Air Force - Postwar.

Romania

- Romanian Air Corps - 20 UFAG C.I captured from the Hungarian Soviet Republic in 1919.

== Specifications (C.I second series 161.23 - 161.250) ==
Data from Austro-Hungarian Army Aircraft of World War One, An Illustrated Guide to World Military Aircraft, 1914-2000

General characteristics

- Crew: 2
- Length: 7.41 m (24 ft 4 in)
- Upper wingspan: 9.5 m (31 ft 2 in)
- Lower wingspan: 9.4 m (30 ft 10 in)
- Height: 2.7 m (8 ft 10 in)
- Wing area: 26.3 m^{2} (283 sq ft)
- Empty weight: 750 kg (1,653 lb)
- Gross weight: 1,150 kg (2,535 lb)
- Powerplant: 1 × Hiero 6 water-cooled in-line piston engine, 170 kW (230 hp)
- Propellers: 2-bladed wooden fixed-pitch propeller

Performance

- Maximum speed: 190 km/h (120 mph, 100 kn)
- Range: 350 km (220 mi, 190 nmi)
- Endurance: 3 hours
- Service ceiling: 4,900 m (16,100 ft)

Armament

- Guns: 1 x 8 mm (0.315 in) Schwarzlose machine-gun forward-firing fixed machine guns; 1 x 8 mm (0.315 in) Schwarzlose machine-gun in trainable rear cockpit mounting
- Bombs: 12 x 12 kg (26 lb) bombs (161.131 onwards)
