= List of World War I flying aces from Romania =

During the campaigns of 1916-1919, Romanian airmen achieved about 10,000 flight hours, had about 700 aerial fights and shot down some 51-91 enemy aircraft, including observation balloons.

== World War I Romanian aces ==
During the First World War, 4 airmen of the Romanian Air Corps earned more than 5 victories. However, by Romanian air victory standards (no shared victories counted), only one of them was considered an ace, Dumitru Bădulescu. As an air observer, he only shared victories with his pilot.

The following list includes all Romanian airmen who have achieved 5 or more victories, including shared and unconfirmed ones.

Name	Brevet	Victories	Notes
Cpt. Gheorghe Mihăilescu (pilot)	Brevet no. 19/1 October 1913	8	4 shared
Slt. Dumitru-Cicerone Bădulescu (observer)	Brevet no. 78/24 June 1917	8	3 unconfirmed Only ace by Romanian standards
Slt. Marin Popescu (pilot)	Brevet no. 44/3 June 1915	5	1 shared
Sgt. Nicolae Mănescu (pilot)	Brevet no. 109 bis/12 December 1916	5	4 shared

== World War I Romanian airmen who achieved at least 1 victory ==
The following list includes all Romanian airmen who achieved at least 1 victory, including shared, unconfirmed and those achieved in 1919. (Note: This list might not be complete.)

Name	Brevet	Victories	Notes
Petre Ioanin (pilot)	Brevet no. 74/14 December 1915	4	shared with the observer
Egon Nasta (pilot)	Brevet no. 99/23 August 1916	4	1 shared
Vasile Craiu (pilot)	Brevet no. 59/13 August 1915	3	1 shared
Grigore Gafencu (observer)	Brevet no. 80/1 July 1917	3	shared with the pilot
Ion Dragomirescu (pilot)	Brevet no. 108 bis/15 November 1916	3	2 achieved while flying for France; 1 in 1919
Stan Bucur (pilot)	Brevet no. 37/24 November 1914	3	shared with the observer 1 in 1919
Ioan Georgescu (pilot)	Brevet no. 42/3 June 1915	3	1 shared
Panait Cholet (pilot)	Brevet no. 31/18 July 1914	2	shared with the observer
Dumitru Darian (observer)	Brevet no. 72/17 May 1917	2	shared with the pilot
Ermil Gheorghiu (observer)	Brevet no. 19/4 September 1915	2	shared with the pilot
Gheorghe Gheorghiu (pilot)	Brevet no. 98/29 August 1916	2	1 shared
Constantin Gonta (observer)	Brevet no. 74/8 June 1917	2	shared with the pilot
Ioan Ralea Ioanid (observer)	Brevet no. 70/19 April 1917	2	shared with the pilot
Marcel Drăgușanu (pilot)	Brevet from France	2	achieved in the same mission damaged a 3rd aircraft on the same mission
Carol Pauchert (pilot)	Brevet no. 78/3 March 1916	2	1 shared
Dumitru Crăsnaru (pilot)	Brevet no. 80/4 March 1915	2	1 shared with the observer
Nicolae "Nae" Cicei (pilot)	Brevet no. 60/13 August 1915	2	shared with the observer
Ion Muntenescu (pilot)	Brevet no. 102/23 August 1916	2	achieved in the same mission
Constantin Pârvulescu (observer)	Brevet no. 75/10 June 1917	2	shared with the pilot
Ștefan Iliescu (observer)	Brevet no. 88/6 July 1916	2	shared with the pilot
Gheorghe Negrescu (pilot)	Brevet no. 3/17 July 1911	1	shared with the observer
Vasile Alexăndreanu (pilot)	Brevet no. 28/10 July 1914	1	shared with the observer
Cicerone Olănescu (pilot)	Brevet no. 38/16 May 1915	1	shared with the observer
Ştefan Sănătescu (observer)	Brevet no. 73/1 June 1917	1	shared with the pilot
Aurel Constantinescu (observer)	Brevet from France	1	shared with the pilot in 1919
Nicolae Drosso (pilot)	Brevet no. 151/11 April 1919	1	shared with the observer in 1919
Nistor Grecu (pilot)	Brevet no. 149 bis/14 March 1919	1	shared with the observer in 1919
Mihail Hurmuzescu (pilot)	Brevet no. 144/29 October 1918	1	shared with the pilot (flew as an observer) in 1919
Iosif Răcășanu (pilot)	Brevet no. 111/5 May 1917	1	in 1919
Ioan Sava (pilot)	Brevet no. 130/12 July 1918	1	shared with the observer in 1919 ex-Austro-Hungarian pilot
Dumitru Sfetescu (observer)		1	shared with the pilot in 1919
Alexandru Vasilescu (observer)	Brevet no. 87/26 August 1917	1	shared with the pilot
Mihai Vitzu (balloon observer)	Brevet no. 5/1 June 1917	1	while in the basket of his balloon
Ioan Vlad (observer)	possibly a foreign brevet	1	shared with the pilot
Ion Barzon (pilot and observer)	Brevet no. 83/7 August 1917 (observer); Brevet no. 141/29 October 1918 (pilot)	1	shared with the pilot
Ioan Dumitrescu (pilot)	Brevet no. 32/18 July 1914	1	shared with the observer
Paul Magâlea (pilot)	Brevet no. 43/3 June 1915	1	
Gheorghe Stâlpeanu (pilot)	Brevet no. 123/31 May 1918	1	shared with the pilot
Ioan Gruia (observer)	Brevet no. 50/5 June 1915	1	shared with the pilot
Dumitru Naidinescu (pilot)	Brevet no. 84 /22 March 1916	1	shared with the observer
Nicolae Tănase (pilot)	Brevet no. 35/6 October 1914	1	shared with the observer
Anghel Gănțoiu (pilot)	Brevet no. 40/16 May 1915	1	unconfirmed
Nae "Mitralieră" Iliescu (pilot)	Brevet no. 93/6 July 1916	1	shared with the observer
Andrei Șișu (pilot)	Brevet no. 41/16 May 1915	1	shared with the observer
Dumitru Teodorescu (pilot)	Brevet no. 49/5 June 1915	1	shared with the observer

== Other World War I aces born on the territory of modern-day Romania ==
Two other aces of the war were born on the territory of present-day Romania. Both serving in the K.u.K. Luftfahrtruppen.

Name	Victories	Notes
Rudolf Weber	6	born in Sighișoara, Transylvania in 1890
Karl Patzelt	5 (2 shared)	born in Craiova, Romania in 1893

== See also ==
- Lists of World War I flying aces
