= Aero A.26 =

A.26

General information
- Type: Reconnaissance
- National origin: Czechoslovakia
- Manufacturer: Aero Vodochody

History
- First flight: 1923
- Developed from: Hansa-Brandenburg B.I

The Aero A.26 was a Czechoslovak military reconnaissance biplane aircraft built by Aero Vodochody in the 1920s. It was Aero's last design to be based on the Hansa-Brandenburg B.I aircraft that the company had been building under licence during World War I as the Ae.10.

It first flew in 1923 and a small series was built. They were later used in the Czechoslovak civilian aviation.

== Specifications ==
Data from

General characteristics

- Crew: 2
- Length: 8.3 m (27 ft 3 in)
- Wingspan: 12.3 m (40 ft 4 in)
- Wing area: 38.5 m^{2} (414 sq ft)
- Empty weight: 882 kg (1,944 lb)
- Gross weight: 1,196 kg (2,637 lb)
- Powerplant: 1 × BMW IIIa 6-cylinder water-cooled in-line piston engine, 138 kW (185 hp)

Performance

- Maximum speed: 158 km/h (98 mph, 85 kn)
- Cruise speed: 120 km/h (75 mph, 65 kn)
- Service ceiling: 6,000 m (20,000 ft)
- Rate of climb: 2.25 m/s (443 ft/min)
- Wing loading: 31 kg/m^{2} (6.3 lb/sq ft)
- Power/mass: 0.120 kW/kg (0.073 hp/lb)

Armament

- 1 × Machine-gun
- Light bombs

== Operators ==
- Czechoslovakia

== See also ==
Related development

- Hansa-Brandenburg B.I
- Aero A.14
