= Hansa-Brandenburg B.I =

Austro-Hungarian Light Training Aircraft

B.I
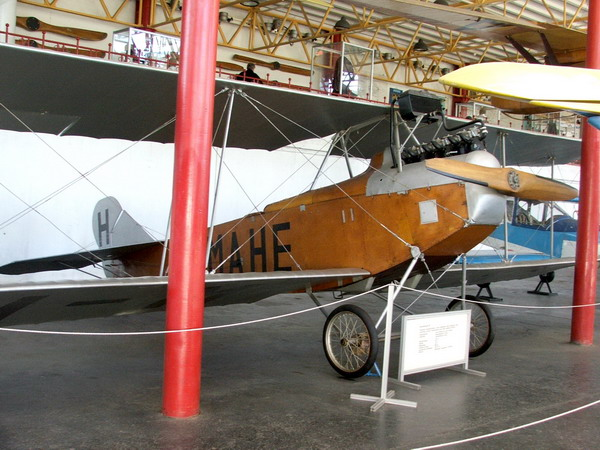

General information
- Type: Reconnaissance aircraft
- National origin: Germany
- Manufacturer: Hansa-Brandenburg
- Designer: Ernst Heinkel
- Primary user: KuKLFT
- Number built: 27

History
- First flight: 1914

The Hansa-Brandenburg B.I was an unarmed military trainer and reconnaissance biplane of World War I, flown by the Austro-Hungarian Air Service. Early models were known internally to the Hansa-Brandenburg firm as the type D, while later models with a more powerful engine were designated FD. This aircraft was one of the earliest designs of Ernst Heinkel, who was working for Hansa-Brandenburg at the time. It was an entirely conventional two-bay biplane with staggered wings of unequal span. The pilot and observer sat in tandem in a long open cockpit.

The aircraft was produced under license by Aero, both during the war and afterwards (when it became known as the Aero Ae 01), and also by Letov, as the Š10. Experience gained with this design would provide Aero with the basis for a number of derivative civil and military designs throughout the 1920s.

The design formed the basis for the C.I and C.II armed reconnaissance types.

== Development and design ==
In April–May 1914, the aircraft designer Ernst Heinkel joined the newly established Brandenburgische Flugzeugwerke after leaving Albatros Flugzeugwerke, and shortly afterwards, Brandenburgische Flugzeugwerke merged with Hansa-Flugzeugwerke to become Hansa-Brandenburg. Heinkel's first design for Hansa-Brandenburg was the Type D, a single-engined reconnaissance aircraft. It was a two-bay biplane with wood and fabric wings and tail surfaces, and a fuselage of steel tube structure covered with plywood. It was powered by a 100–110 hp (75–82 kW) Benz Bz.II engine. Twelve Type Ds were built by Brandenburg for the German Army air arm in 1914.

The Type FD was an improved derivative of the D, with revised tail surfaces and two- or three-bay wings with inward sloping wing struts. It was powered by a Benz B.II engine, or a 100 hp (75 kW) Mercedes engine. Eight or nine were built in 1914, and given the German designation Brandenburg B.I.

The Type LDD was a further improved aircraft, differing from the FD by having a wooden engine mount rather than the steel mounts by the earlier versions, which saved weight. The type was built by Brandenburg for the Austro-Hungarian Army Air Arm (designated as the Brandenburg B.I by the Austrians), and under license by the Austro-Hungarian Army's aircraft works (Flugzeugwerke) at Fischamend, in a series of gradually improved versions, with various powerplants, serving initially as an unarmed reconnaissance aircraft and later as a trainer. Brandenburg built 102 LDDs, while over 400 were built at Fischamend, with production continuing until shortly after the end of the First World War.

== Variants ==
D
Initial version with Benz Bz.II engine. Twelve built.
FD
Revised version with modified tail and Benz Bz.II or Mercedes engine. Designated Brandenburg B.I by Germany. Eight or nine built.
LDD
Improved version with lighter structure. Large scale production for Austria-Hungary. Designated Brandenburg B.I by Austria-Hungary.

Brandenburg B.I Series 05.1

Production version of LDD built by Brandenburg and powered by 100 hp (75 kW) Mercedes engine. 102 built.

Brandenburg B.I(Fd) Series 06.5

Conversion of Series 05.1 aircraft to trainers by Flugzeugwerke Fischamend. 49 converted.

Brandenburg B.I(Fd) Series 75

Fischamend-built single-control trainer, powered by 100 hp Mercedes engine. 28 built.

Brandenburg B.I(Fd) Series 76

Fischamend-built, 100 hp Mercedes, single or dual controls. 99 built.

Brandenburg B.I(Fd) Series 176

Fischamend-built, 100 hp Mercedes, single controls. 99 built.

Brandenburg B.I(Fd) Series 276

Fischamend-built, 100 hp Mercedes. 24 built.

Brandenburg B.I(Fd) Series 77

Fischamend-built, 100 hp Daimler, single controls. 41 built.

Brandenburg B.I(Fd) Series 78

Fischamend-built, 120 hp (89 kW) Daimler, dual controls. 51 built.

Brandenburg B.I(Fd) Series 278

Fischamend-built, Daimler engine. 3 built late 1918.

Brandenburg B.I(Fd) Series 79

Fischamend-built, 145 hp (108 kW) Hiero 6 engine. 21 built.

Brandenburg B.I(Fd) Series 279

Fischamend-built, Hiero engine. 49 built.

== Operators ==
Austria-Hungary

- Austro-Hungarian Imperial and Royal Aviation Troops
- Austro-Hungarian Navy

Poland

- Polish Air Force (postwar, 15 aircraft)

Czechoslovakia

- Czechoslovak Air Force (postwar)

Kingdom of Hungary

- Royal Hungarian Air Force

Kingdom of Yugoslavia

- Yugoslav Royal Air Force (postwar)
- Letalski center Maribor (postwar)

== Surviving aircraft ==
Only a single Hansa-Brandenburg B.I has survived World War One, it is located in the Budapest Aviation Museum in Hungary.

== Specifications (FD) ==
Data from

General characteristics

- Crew: 2
- Length: 8.46 m (27 ft 9 in)
- Wingspan: 13.13 m (43 ft 1 in)
- Height: 2.9 m (9 ft 6 in)
- Wing area: 43.5 m^{2} (468 sq ft)
- Empty weight: 760 kg (1,676 lb)
- Gross weight: 1,060 kg (2,337 lb)
- Powerplant: × Benz Bz.III 6-cylinder water-cooled in-line piston engine, 120 kW (160 hp)

Performance

- Maximum speed: 125 km/h (78 mph, 67 kn)
- Range: 300 km (190 mi, 160 nmi)
- Service ceiling: 3,200 m (10,500 ft)
- Rate of climb: 2.2 m/s (430 ft/min)

== See also ==
Related development

- Hansa-Brandenburg C.I
- Aero Ae 01
- Aero A.14
- Aero A.15
