= Otto Hieronimus =

Technician, car and engine designer and car racer

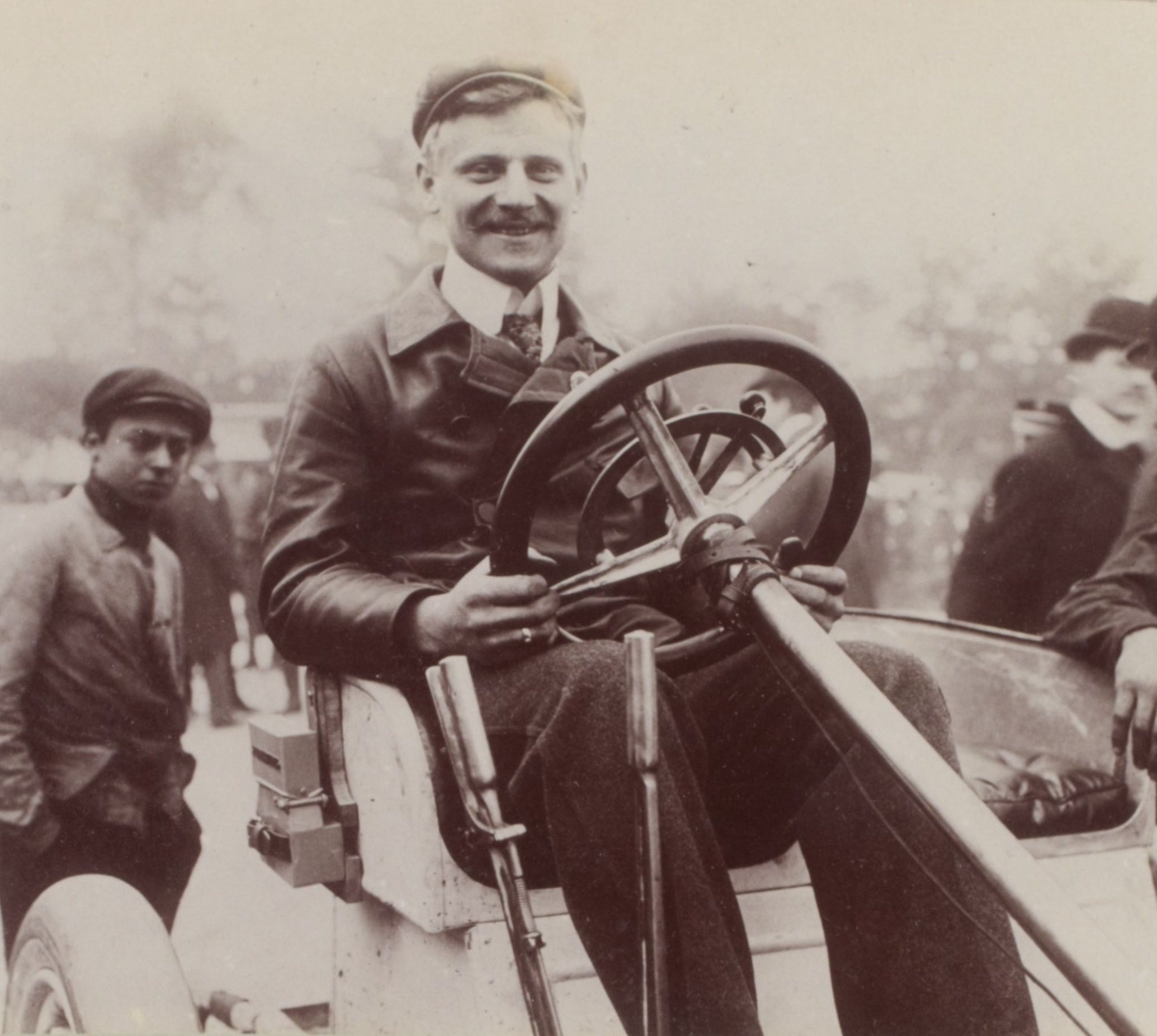
- Otto Hieronimus (1903)
- Born: 26 July 1879; Cologne, German Empire
- Died: 8 May 1922 (aged 42); Steyr, Austrian Republic
- Occupations: Engineer, car and engine designer, automotive pioneer

Otto Hieronimus (26 July 1879 – 8 May 1922) was a German-Austrian engineer, car and engine designer, pilot and race car driver being one of the most successful Austrian car racers of his age.

== Career ==
Otto Hieronimus was born in 1879 in Cologne as the son of a local representative of the Benz & Cie company. Between 1896 and 1898 he worked for the Benz company in Mannheim, then he continued in his studies and attended a technical school in Hildburghausen, Thuringia.

In 1901 he was tasked to deliver Benz Patent Motorwagen number 1 to Arnold Spitz. Spitz, the largest car dealer in Vienna, offering brands like Benz & Cie., De Dion-Bouton or Mercedes, entrusted Hieronimus with the construction of his own car for Austrian car company Gräf & Stift, also co-owned by Spitz. The result was a car known as the Spitz-Wagen, a model which was produced and then distributed by Spitz's company between 1902 and 1903.

In December 1907 Hieronimus started to work as a constructor and test driver in Laurin & Klement motorbikes and car factory in Mladá Boleslav, Bohemia, the predecessor of today's Škoda Auto. With L&K cars he was attending multiple car races and meetings. In 1908, Hieronimus set a new speed record on the world's first permanent circuit at Brooklands, United Kingdom in Laurin & Klement FCS - 118.72 km/h on the 2.76-mile track. In the same year he won victory in his class in Saint Petersburg–Moscow race with a 16-horsepower Laurin & Klement FC. In Laurin & Klement FCR engine he succeeded to set a track record in the Zbraslav–Jíloviště hillclimb race (near Prague) in 1911 (3:44.2 min).

In Mladá Boleslav Hieronimus also designed aircraft engines, the first of those, marked Hiero 55 HP, was created in 1909, being probably the first aircraft engine constructed in Austria-Hungary. Its qualities were proved by the application to the L&K aircraft and its first flight in 1910, which Hieronimus piloted by himself. However, he left the Laurin & Klement company in May 1911 devoted himself to the construction of aircraft Hiero engines at the Warchalowski company in Austria, where he worked until the end of World War I. Hieronymus's engines, like Hiero 6 type, were largely used in a multiple types if aircraft of the Austro-Hungarian Aviation Troops during World War I and also in post-war aircraft designs created in freshly established Czechoslovakia.

However, the Treaty of Saint-Germain-en-Laye stopped further development of the aircraft engines in First Austrian Republic, and Hieronimus returned to focus on designing cars and to car racing, later working as a technical director of the Österreichische Waffenfabriks-Gesellschaft weapon and car factory in Steyr. At the first post-war Zbraslav–Jíloviště race in 1921 he won in the F7 category (series cars) up to 6 l displacement in an Austro-Daimler car with a time of 4:09 min.

Otto Hieronimus was seriously injured in a car crash on 8 May 1922 during the Rieß uphill race and died later that day in Steyr city hospital aged 42. He was buried at Dornbach Cemetery in Hernals, Vienna.

== Literature ==
- George Nick Georgano: The Beaulieu Encyclopedia of the Automobile. Volume 3: P–Z. Fitzroy Dearborn Publishers, Chicago 2001, ISBN 1-57958-293-1.
