= UFAG D.I =

D.I

General information
- Type: fighter
- National origin: Austro-Hungarian Empire
- Manufacturer: Ufag (Ungarische Flugzeugfabrik Abteil Gesellschaft / Ungarische Flugzeugwerke Aktien Gesellschaft)
- Designer: Stankop Bloudek
- Number built: 0

The Ufag D.I was a high-wing monoplane with monocoque fuselage, powered by a Le Rhône(St) engine. Although there is no direct evidence, it is highly likely that the D.I under construction was the Ufag 60.02.

== Variants ==
D.I
Service designation for proposed production aircraft
Ufag 60.02
probable designation for the first D.I prototype under construction at the time of the armistice.

== Specifications (60.03 / D.I) ==
Data from Austro-Hungarian Army Aircraft of World War One

General characteristics

- Crew: 1
- Wingspan: 8.5 m (27 ft 11 in)
- Wing area: 15.6 m^{2} (168 sq ft)
- Empty weight: 380 kg (838 lb)
- Gross weight: 630 kg (1,389 lb)
- Powerplant: 1 × Le Rhône(St) 9-cylinder air-cooled rotary piston engine, 110 kW (150 hp)

Performance

== Bibliography ==
- Green, William & Swanborough, Gordon (2001) [1994]. The Complete Book of Fighters: An Illustrated Encyclopedia of Every Fighter Built and Flown (Revised and Updated ed.). London: Salamander Books. ISBN 1-84065-269-1.
- Grosz, Peter Michael; Haddow, George & Schiemer, Peter (1993). Austro-Hungarian Army Aircraft of World War One. Mountain View, California: Flying Machines Press. ISBN 0-9637110-0-8.
