= Friedrichshafen FF.11 =

General information
- Type: Floatplane
- National origin: Germany
- Manufacturer: Flugzeugbau Friedrichshafen GmbH
- Number built: 1

The Friedrichshafen FF.11 was a flying boat built in Germany in the early 1910s.

== Specifications (FF.11) ==
Data from

General characteristics

- Wing area: 53 m^{2} (570 sq ft)
- Empty weight: 1,180 kg (2,601 lb)
- Gross weight: 1,500 kg (3,307 lb)
- Powerplant: 1 × Benz Bz.II 6-cylinder water-cooled in-line piston engine, 89 kW (120 hp)

NAG 6-cyl 135hp - FF.21

Performance

- Maximum speed: 90 km/h (56 mph, 49 kn)
- Cruise speed: 80 km/h (50 mph, 43 kn)
- Time to altitude: 500 m (1,600 ft) in 15 minutes

== Bibliography ==
- Herris, Jack (2016). Friedrichshafen Aircraft of WWI: A Centennial Perspective on Great War Airplanes. Great War Aviation Centennial Series. Vol. 21. Charleston, South Carolina: Aeronaut Books. ISBN 978-1-935881-35-3.
