= Phönix C.I =

Austro-Hungarian reconnaissance biplane

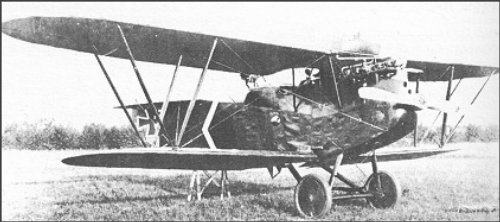

General information
- Type: Reconnaissance and General-Purpose Biplane
- National origin: Austria-Hungary
- Manufacturer: Phönix Flugzeug-Werke
- Primary user: KuKLFT
- Number built: 140

History
- Introduction date: 1918
- Retired: 1920s

The Phönix C.I, given serial numbers in the Phönix 121 range, was an Austro-Hungarian First World War reconnaissance and general-purpose biplane built by Phönix and Lloyd.

== Development ==
The Phönix C.I was the first original design developed by the Phönix Flugzeug-Werke It was based on the Hansa-Brandenburg C.II that Phönix was building under licence. A conventional biplane with a rear fuselage/tailplane similar to aircraft designed by Ernst Heinkel. The C.I had a fixed tail-skid landing gear and was powered by a 171.51 kW (230 hp) Hiero 6-cylinder inline piston engine, it had two tandem open cockpits for the pilot and observer/gunner. The company built 110 C.Is and then entered service with the KuKLFT in early 1918. After the First World War 30 aircraft were built by the Swedish Army engineering department fitted with 220 hp (164 kW) Benz Bz.IV inline engines.

== Designations and serials ==
Phönix C.I aircraft built by Phönix were serialled from Phönix C.I 121.01 to Phönix C.I 121.160 and Phönix C.I aircraft ordered from Lloyd (Ungarische Lloyd Flugzeug und Motorenfabrik AG) were allocated serials from Phönix C.I(Ll) 49.01 to Phönix C.I(Ll) 49.100. Some 80 aircraft ordered from UFAG were not assigned serial numbers, probably due to production being interrupted by the Armistice and 225 more were ordered but not built.

== Operators ==
Austria-Hungary

- KuKLFT

Hungary

- Hungarian Air Force - Postwar

Romania

- Royal Romanian Air Force - Postwar

Sweden

- Royal Swedish Air Force

Kingdom of Yugoslavia

- Yugoslav Royal Air Force - Postwar

== Specifications (C.1) ==
Data from Austro-Hungarian Army Aircraft of World War OneIllustrated Encyclopedia of Aircraft

General characteristics

- Crew: 2
- Length: 7.52 m (24 ft 8 in)
- Upper wingspan: 11 m (36 ft 1 in)
- Lower wingspan: 8.6 m (28 ft 3 in)
- Height: 2.95 m (9 ft 8 in)
- Wing area: 29 m^{2} (310 sq ft)
- Empty weight: 820 kg (1,808 lb)
- Gross weight: 1,240 kg (2,734 lb)
- Powerplant: 1 × Hiero 6 6-cylinder water-cooled in-line piston engines, 170 kW (230 hp)

Performance

- Maximum speed: 175 km/h (109 mph, 94 kn)
- Endurance: 3 hours 50 minutes
- Service ceiling: 5,400 m (17,700 ft)
- Time to altitude:

- 1,000 m (3,281 ft): in 4 minutes 30 seconds
- 2,000 m (6,562 ft): in 10 minutes 45 seconds
- 3,000 m (9,843 ft): in 20 minutes 35 seconds
- 4,000 m (13,123 ft): in 34 minutes 50 seconds
- 5,000 m (16,404 ft): in 55 minutes

Armament
2 x 8 mm Schwarzlose machine guns (one synchronised forward-firing and one on a mount in rear cockpit)
