= Hrabišín =

- Municipality
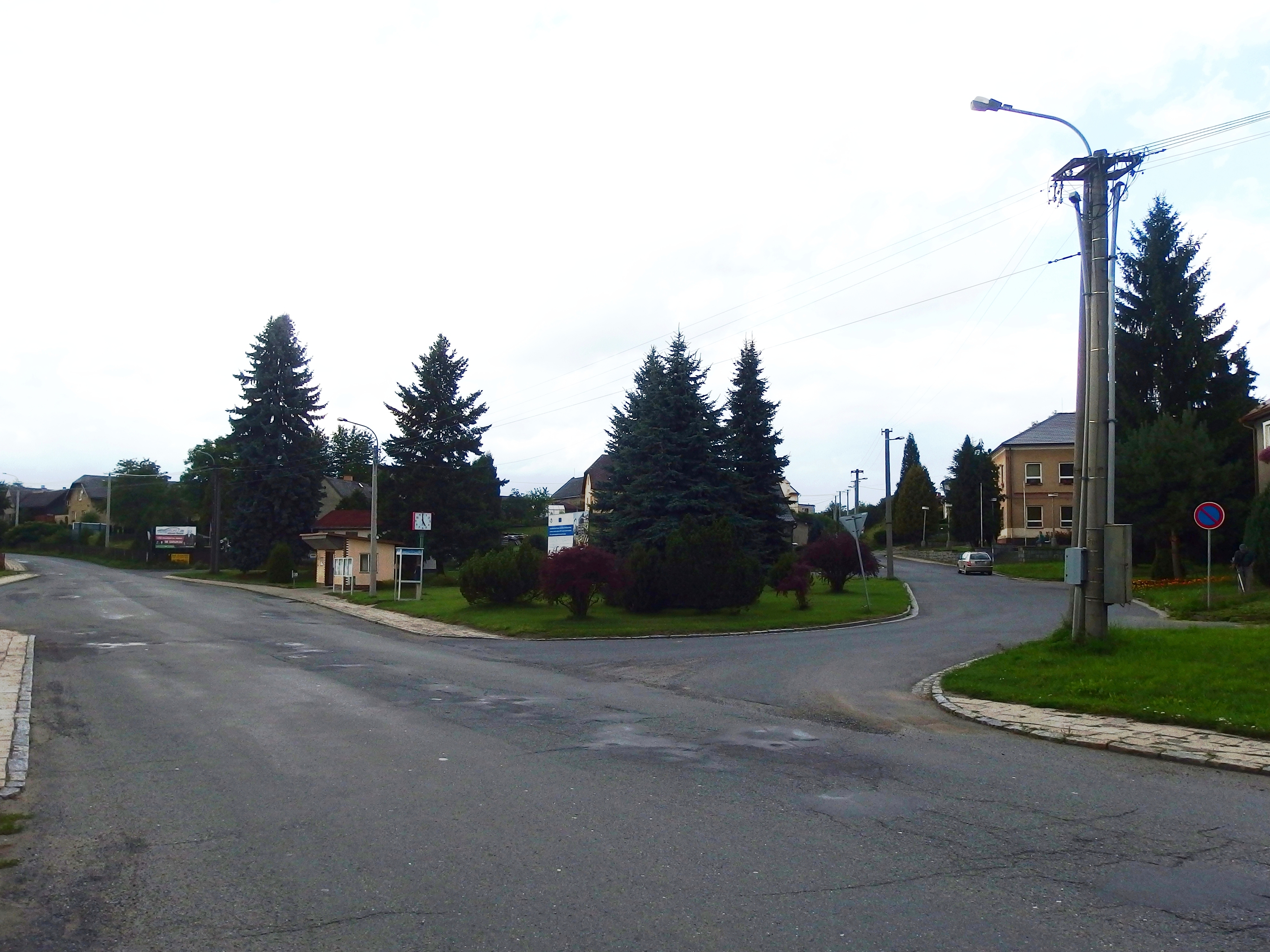
- Centre of Hrabišín

- Flag Coat of arms

- Location in the Czech Republic
- Coordinates: 49°54′51″N 17°2′11″E
- Country: Czech Republic
- Region: Olomouc
- District: Šumperk
- First mentioned: 1352

Area
  - Total: 13.85 km^{2} (5.35 sq mi)
- Elevation: 320 m (1,050 ft)

Population (2026-01-01)
  - Total: 876
  - Density: 63.2/km^{2} (164/sq mi)
- Time zone: UTC+1 (CET)
  - Summer (DST): UTC+2 (CEST)
- Postal codes: 788 04
- Website: www.hrabisin.cz

Hrabišín (German: Rabersdorf) is a municipality and village in Šumperk District in the Olomouc Region of the Czech Republic. It has about 900 inhabitants.

Hrabišín lies approximately 7 kilometres (4 mi) south-east of Šumperk, 40 km (25 mi) north-west of Olomouc, and 188 km (117 mi) east of Prague.

== Demographics ==
Historical population
| Year | Pop. | ±% |
|---|---|---|
| 1869 | 1,428 | — |
| 1880 | 1,489 | +4.3% |
| 1890 | 1,636 | +9.9% |
| 1900 | 1,644 | +0.5% |
| 1910 | 1,493 | −9.2% |
| 1921 | 1,345 | −9.9% |
| 1930 | 1,416 | +5.3% |
| 1950 | 901 | −36.4% |
| 1961 | 954 | +5.9% |
| 1970 | 848 | −11.1% |
| 1980 | 862 | +1.7% |
| 1991 | 806 | −6.5% |
| 2001 | 844 | +4.7% |
| 2011 | 849 | +0.6% |
| 2021 | 765 | −9.9% |
Source: Censuses
