= Aero Ae 01 =

Ae 01
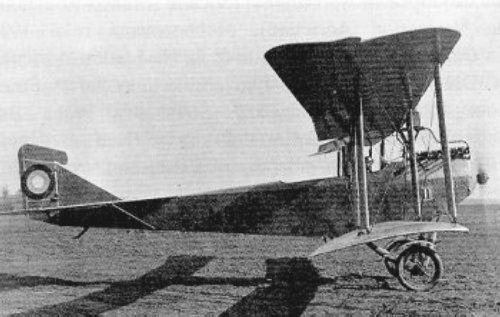

General information
- Type: Trainer
- National origin: Czechoslovakia
- Manufacturer: Aero

History
- First flight: 1919
- Developed from: Hansa-Brandenburg B.I

The Aero Ae 01 was a Czechoslovak military trainer biplane built in 1919 and was Aero's first attempt to modify one of the aircraft designs they had been manufacturing under licence during World War I, the Hansa-Brandenburg B.I. It was designed by Antonín Vlasák under the direction of Jan Kouril. The project was originally designated as Ae 10, but later re-designated to Ae 01. The army operated the aircraft under designation A-1.

General characteristics

- Crew: 2
- Length: 8.5 m (27 ft 11 in)
- Wingspan: 12.9 m (42 ft 4 in)
- Height: 3.2 m (10 ft 6 in)
- Wing area: 35.6 m^{2} (383 sq ft)
- Empty weight: 715 kg (1,576 lb)
- Gross weight: 970 kg (2,138 lb)
- Powerplant: 1 × Breitfeld-Daněk Blesk 6-cyl. water-cooled in-line piston engine, 74 kW (99 hp)

Performance

- Maximum speed: 110 km/h (68 mph, 59 kn)
- Range: 250 km (160 mi, 130 nmi)
- Service ceiling: 3,500 m (11,500 ft)
- Rate of climb: 1.75 m/s (344 ft/min)

== Operators ==
- Czechoslovakia - Czechoslovak Air Force

== See also ==
Related development

- Aero A.14
- Hansa-Brandenburg B.I
