= Ufag =

Early Hungarian aircraft manufacturer

UFAG (German: Ungarische Flugzeugfabrik A.G., Hungarian: Magyar Repülőgépgyár Rt. in short: "MARE"), was a Hungarian aircraft manufacturer formed by the Ganz Works and the Manfred Weiss Works in Budapest in 1912. They built aircraft of their own design as well as under licence from Lohner and Hansa-Brandenburg.

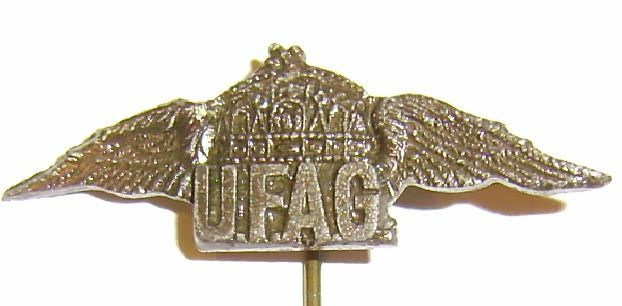
UFAG badge from 1912

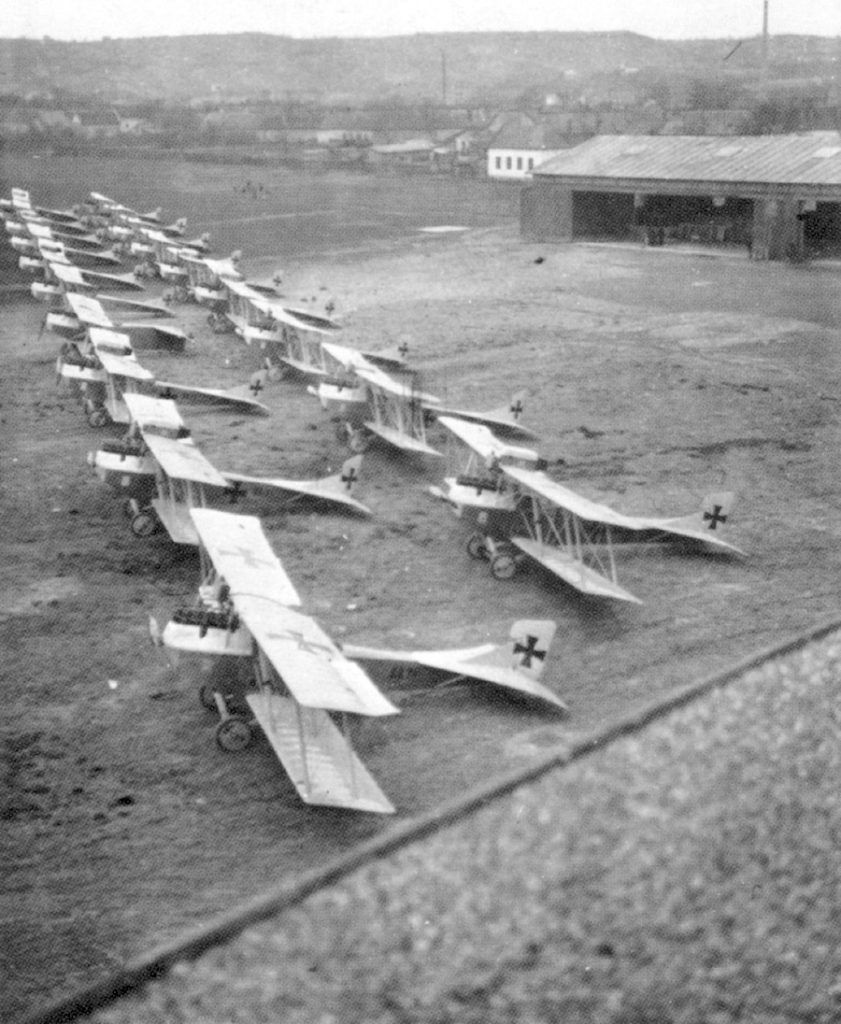
UFAG Brandenburg C.I aircraft in Albertfalva (Budapest ) in 1916

== History ==
It was not until 1912 that the first Hungarian aircraft factory was built in Budapest, with the cooperation of Ganz-Danubius, the Weiss Manfréd factory, the Hitelbank and financier Camilio Castiglioni, who had also helped BMW. The company was named the First Hungarian Airship and Aircraft Factory and, lacking its own designs, began by producing Lohner aircraft under licence.

The company's first manager was Viktor Wittmann, who in 1910, after getting a degree in mechanical engineering, studied aircraft manufacturing in Reims, France. The next year, he was testing aircraft for the Dual Monarchy's air force at the Aspern airbase in Austria. In May 1915, during a demonstration flight of one of the factory's military aircraft, he lost control of the aircraft and crashed from a height of 30 to 40 metres.

The first site of the factory did not have an airfield, so the aircraft had to be transported to Rákosmező, to be assembled and tested.

The increasing demand for aircraft, allowed the company to grow rapidly, outgrowing the available space. They found a new site in Albertfalva, a carpentry centre at the time, on the outeskirts of Fehérvári út, where there was enough space not only for hangars and an unpaved grass airfield.

Hansa-Brandenburgische Flugzeug Werke then joined the company's ownership, and from then on the company began to produce aircraft under the names MARE (Magyar Repülőgépgyár Rt.) and UFAG (Ungarische Flugzeugfabrik Aktien Gesellschaft), including an increasing number of German-designed Hansa-Brandenburg C.I. aircraft, which with 1,258 aircraft, accounted for a quarter of the Austro-Hungarian Empire's First World War fleet.

These were canvas-covered, wood-frame and plywood machines - which was why the carpenters who were to be found in the area were so useful - and the aircraft built were powered by 160, 200 and 230 hp Hiero engines manufactured by UFAG. They were armed with one or two Schwarzlose machine guns, redesigned for aircraft use, with greatly increased rate of fire.

== UFAG aircraft ==
(Ungarische Flugzeugfabrik Abteil Gesellschaft / Ungarische Flugzeugwerke Aktien Gesellschaft) Data from:Austro-Hungarian Army Aircraft of World War One

- UFAG 60.01
- UFAG 60.02 (D.I)
- UFAG 60.03 (C.II)
- UFAG series 160 - Hansa-Brandenburg C.II(U)
- UFAG series 61 - Hansa-Brandenburg C.I(U) - Austro-Daimler 210hp (160 kW) engine
- UFAG series 161 - UFAG C.I
- UFAG series 62 - Hansa-Brandenburg G.I(U)
- UFAG series 63 - Hansa-Brandenburg C.I(U) - 120 kW (160 hp) Mercedes D.IIIs
- UFAG series 64 - Hansa-Brandenburg C.I(U) - Austro-Daimler 210 hp (160 kW) engine
- UFAG series 66 - Hansa-Brandenburg C.II(U)
- UFAG series 67 - Hansa-Brandenburg C.I(U) - Austro-Daimler 210 hp (160 kW) engine
- UFAG series 68 - Hansa-Brandenburg C.I(U) - Austro-Daimler 210 hp (160 kW) engine
- UFAG series 69 - Hansa-Brandenburg C.I(U) - 150 kW (200 hp) Hiero V-8?
- UFAG series 169 - Hansa-Brandenburg C.I(U) - with 160 kW (220 hp) Benz Bz.IVas
- UFAG series 269 - Hansa-Brandenburg C.I(U) - Austro-Daimler 210 hp (150 kW) engine
- UFAG series 369 - Hansa-Brandenburg C.I(U) - 170 kW (230 hp) Hiero 6
- UFAG C.I
- UFAG C.II
- UFAG D.I
