= Karl Patzelt =

Austro-Hungarian World War I flying ace

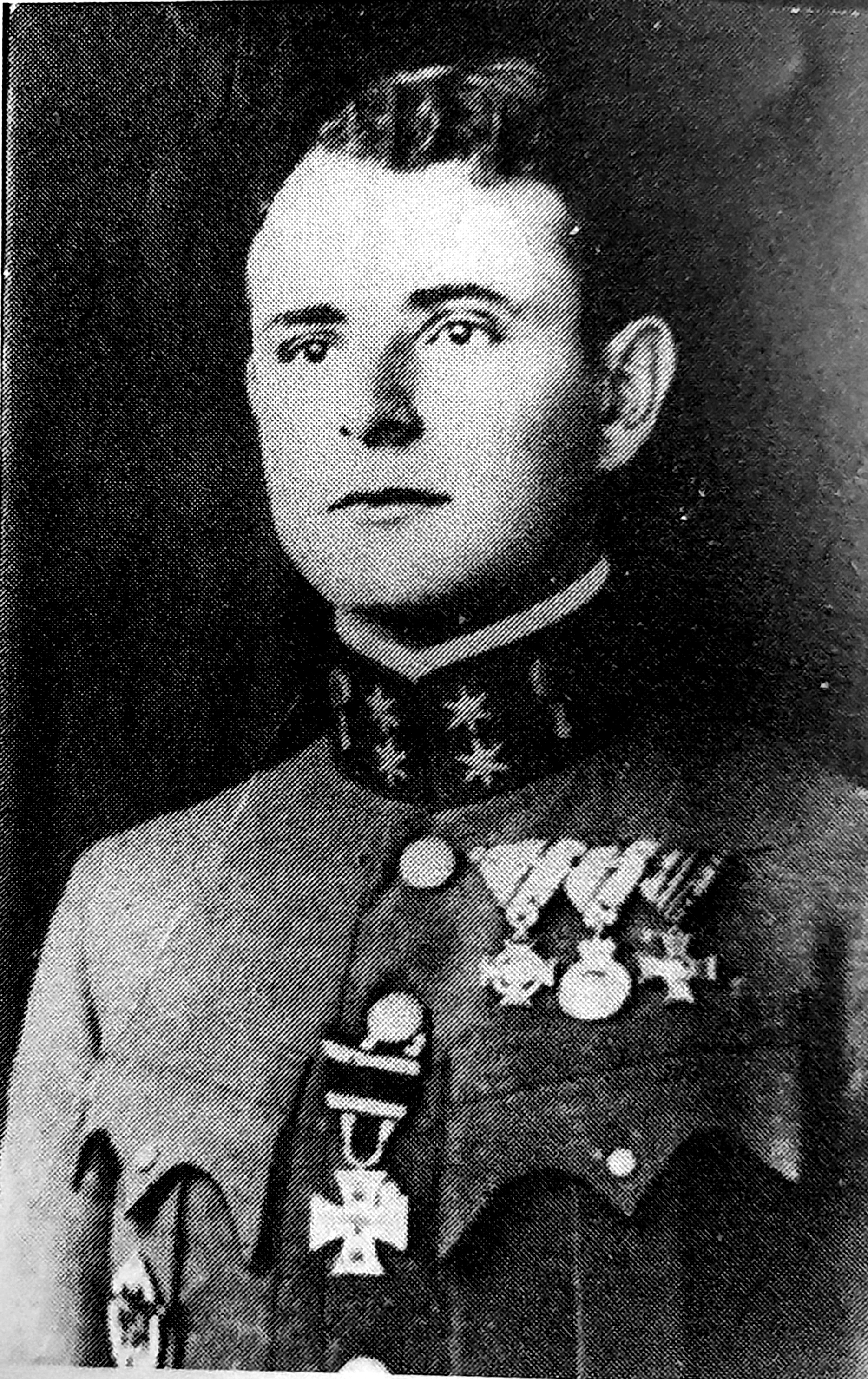
- Born: 3 February 1893; Craiova, Romania
- Died: 4 May 1918 (aged 25); Vidor, Italy
- Military career
- Allegiance: Austro-Hungarian Empire
- Branch: Flying services
- Rank: Oberleutnant
- Units: Flik 29J, Flik 34, Flik 42J, Flik 68J.
- Commands: Flik 68J.
- Conflicts: Battle of Komarow (As Leutnant of the 22nd Regiment) 1914, Gorlice–Tarnów Offensive 1915 (as Oberleutnant), Brusilov Offensive 1916, Battle of Caporetto 1917 (as officer-observer of Flik34),
- Awards: Order of the Iron Crown 3rd Class with War Decoration and Swords, Military Merit Cross, Military Merit Medal (Bronze and Silver), German Iron Cross 2nd Class

Oberleutnant Karl Patzelt (1893–1918) was an Austro-Hungarian World War I flying ace credited with five aerial victories. Entering World War I as an officer in an infantry regiment, he distinguished himself during the first two years of the war. Decorated twice for valor, he was also honored by a rare early promotion in rank. A serious wound inflicted on 16 June 1916 hospitalized him. While recuperating, he transferred to aviation service. Trained and posted as a technical officer for Flik 29J in Romania, he volunteered to fly as an observer with Andreas Dombrowski. On their missions, Patzelt would benefit from Dombrowski's tuition as a pilot, while downing two enemy aircraft with the observer's gun. In October, Patzelt was transferred to the Italian Front to observe the Battle of Caporetto. By mid-November 1917, he was flying with a fighter squadron, Flik 42J. He would score three more victories before being killed in action on 4 May 1918.

== Early life ==
Karl Patzelt was born on 3 February 1893. His birthplace was erroneously recorded as Crajova, Bohemia; no such place exists in Bohemia. In actuality, Patzelt was born in Craiova, Romania, and his legal domicile was the same as his father's, Mladá Boleslav, Bohemia. Patzelt spoke German, Romanian, and Czech. He was orphaned young. When he was old enough, he chose a military career.

== Infantry service ==
When World War I began, Patzelt was an officer in the 22nd Schützen Regiment on the Russian Front. He fought in the Battle of Komarów. During the subsequent Austro-Hungarian retreat, he was wounded on 21 November 1914. He returned from hospital to fight in the Carpathian Mountains and the Gorlice–Tarnów offensive in early 1915. In March 1915, he was awarded the Military Merit Cross with War Decorations and Swords. On 23 March 1915, he received a rare early, out-of-turn promotion to Oberleutnant (First Lieutenant). Six months later, he was awarded a Bronze Military Merit Medal.

Patzelt's health had not fully recouped, so in mid-August 1915, he was assigned to train the regimental reserves. By Spring 1916, he had healed and was reassigned to lead a unit of shock troops. He led this unit in defensive warfare against a Russian offensive until he was seriously wounded on 16 June 1916. During this extended stay in hospital, he decided to transfer to aviation service.

== Aerial Service ==
Once recovered from his latest wound, Patzelt applied for a transfer to aviation duty. In the Autumn of 1916, he received enough training to become a technical officer with Flik 29, which was posted to Romania. The opposition there was not limited to Romanian fliers, it also included Russian and French pilots.

Patzelt began a full schedule of flying combat as an observer, earning his observer's badge in April 1917. While flying as an observer, on 5 February 1917, and again on 21 June, he scored aerial victories while being piloted by Andreas Dombrowski. Under Dombrowski's coaching, Patzelt began learning to fly. During this period, he was awarded the Silver Military Medal; he also garnered the Prussian Iron Cross.

In early October, he was transferred to Flik 34. He flew as an observer during the Battle of Caporetto, which was waged from 24 October to 7 November. Somehow he continued pilot training while still serving as an observer. Once he mastered piloting, he was forwarded to a fighter squadron, Flik 42J, in mid-November 1917. On the 23rd, he shared a victory with Karl Teichmann. Six days later, he shared a victory with Franz Gräser and Ernst Strohschneider. On 29 December 1917, on one of his 40 combat sorties for the month, he shot down a seaplane for his fifth victory. While with Flik 42J, Patzelt was granted his highest honor, the Order of the Iron Crown, Third Class with War Decoration and Swords.

Karl Patzelt was killed in action on 4 May when his Albatros D.III was shot down during a skirmish over Montello, a hill in the Treviso province of Italy. Though most sources credit British ace Gerald Birks with Patzelt's death, one charges Italian ace Giovanni Nicelli with the kill. However, official records still list Patzelt as missing in action.
