= Benz Bz.II =

Bz.II
- Type: 6-cyl. water-cooled in-line piston engine
- National origin: Germany
- Manufacturer: Benz & Cie
- First run: 1913

The Benz Bz.II (manufacturer's designation Benz Type FD) was a six-cylinder, water-cooled, inline engine developed in Germany for use in aircraft in 1913. With a displacement of 10.15 L (619.4 cu in) it developed about 75–82 kW (100–110 hp). It had cast-iron cylinders with sheet metal cooling jackets welded to them. The two overhead valves per cylinder were operated via pushrods and rocker arms by a single camshaft embedded in the engine block on the right-hand side.

== Applications ==
- Albatros W.5
- Hansa-Brandenburg B.I

== Specifications ==
Data from Angle

=== General characteristics ===
- Type: 6-cyl. water-cooled in-line piston engine
- Bore: 116 mm (4.57 in)
- Stroke: 160 mm (6.30 in)
- Displacement: 10.15 L (619.4 cu in)
- Dry weight: c. 193 kg (425 lb)

=== Components ===
- Valvetrain: One camshaft in the engine block, driving one inlet and one exhaust valve per cylinder via pushrods and rocker arms (overhead valve).
- Cooling system: Water-cooled

=== Performance ===
- Power output: 82 kW (110 hp) at 1,300 rpm

== Bibliography ==
- Gunston, Bill (1986). World Encyclopedia of Aero Engines. Wellingborough: Patrick Stephens. pp. 22–23.
- Angle, Glenn Dale (1921). Airplane Engine Encyclopedia: An Alphabetically Arranged Compilation Of All Available Data On The World's Airplane Engines. Otterbein Press. p. 83-85. OL 23525261M.
- "Benz Type FB, FD and FF aero engine manual".
