= Hansa-Brandenburg C.I =

German Armed Biplane

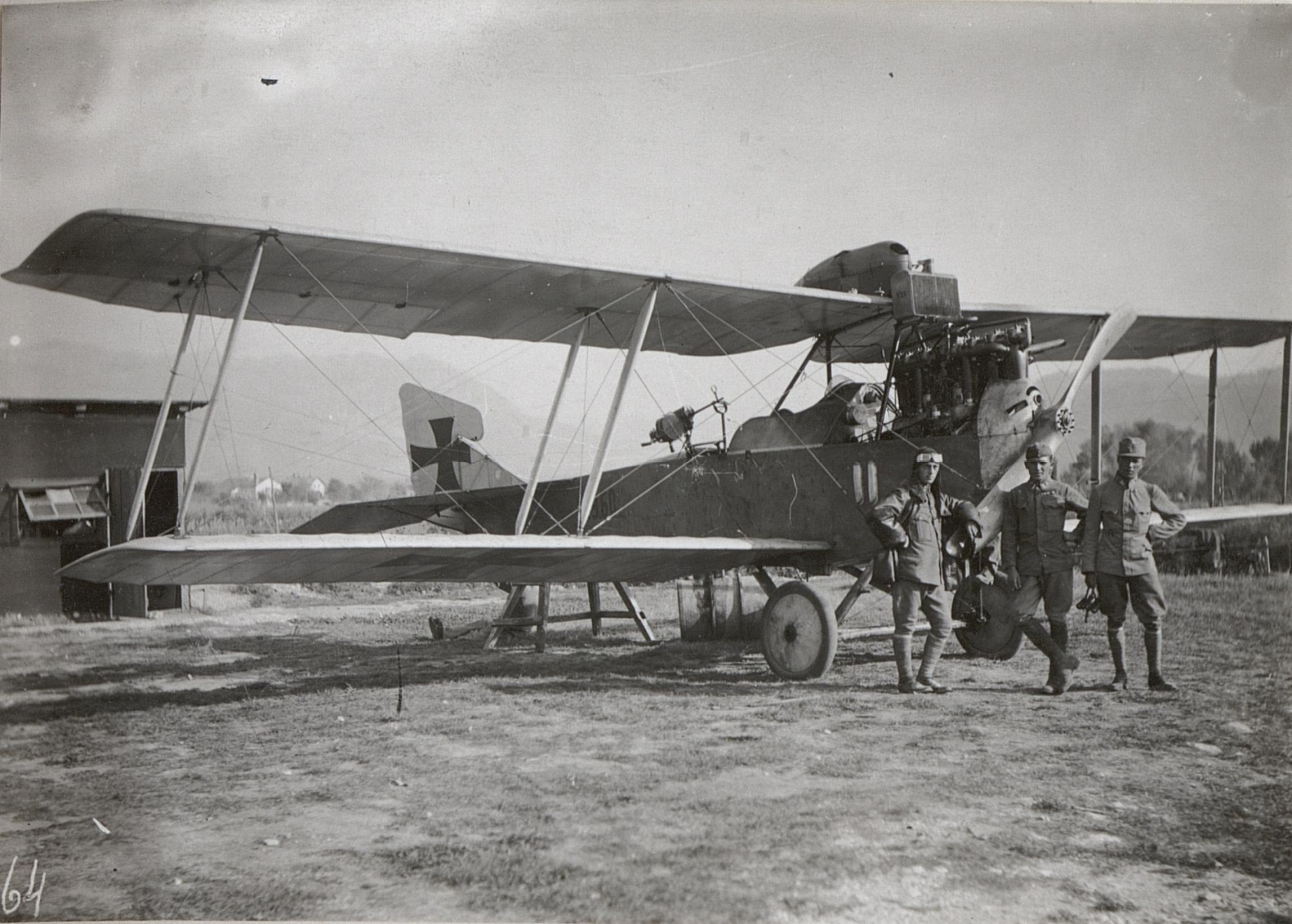

General information
- Type: Reconnaissance aircraft
- Manufacturer: Hansa-Brandenburg; UFAG
- Designer: Ernst Heinkel
- Primary users: Austro-Hungarian Imperial and Royal Aviation Troops Polish Air Force; Romanian Air Force
- Number built: 1318

History
- Introduction date: 1916

The Hansa-Brandenburg C.I, also known as Type LDD, was a 2-seater armed single-engine reconnaissance biplane designed by Ernst Heinkel, who worked at that time for the parent company in Germany. The C.I had similarities with the earlier B.I (Type FD, also designed by Heinkel), including inward-sloping interplane bracing struts. Like other early-war Austro-Hungarian reconnaissance aircraft, such as C-types of Lloyd or Lohner, the Type LDD had a communal cockpit for its crew.

The C.I served in the Imperial and Royal Aviation Troops in visual- and photographic reconnaissance, artillery observation and light bombing duties from early spring 1916 to the end of World War I. The aircraft had good handling characteristics, and steady introduction of more powerful engines in successive production batches (see below) enabled the improvement of performance and thus the continuing front-line service.

Armament of the type consisted of a free-firing 8 mm (0.315 in) Schwarzlose machine gun at the rear for the observer, and at least in some aircraft for the pilot there was also a similar fixed, non-synchronised forward-firing gun in a pod above the top wing. This latter weapon was replaced in later production examples by a synchronised 8 mm (0.315 in) Schwarzlose gun on the port side of the fuselage. The normal bomb load for the C.I was 60 kg (130 lb), but some aircraft could carry one 80 kg (180 lb) and two 10 kg (22 lb) bombs.

== Production ==
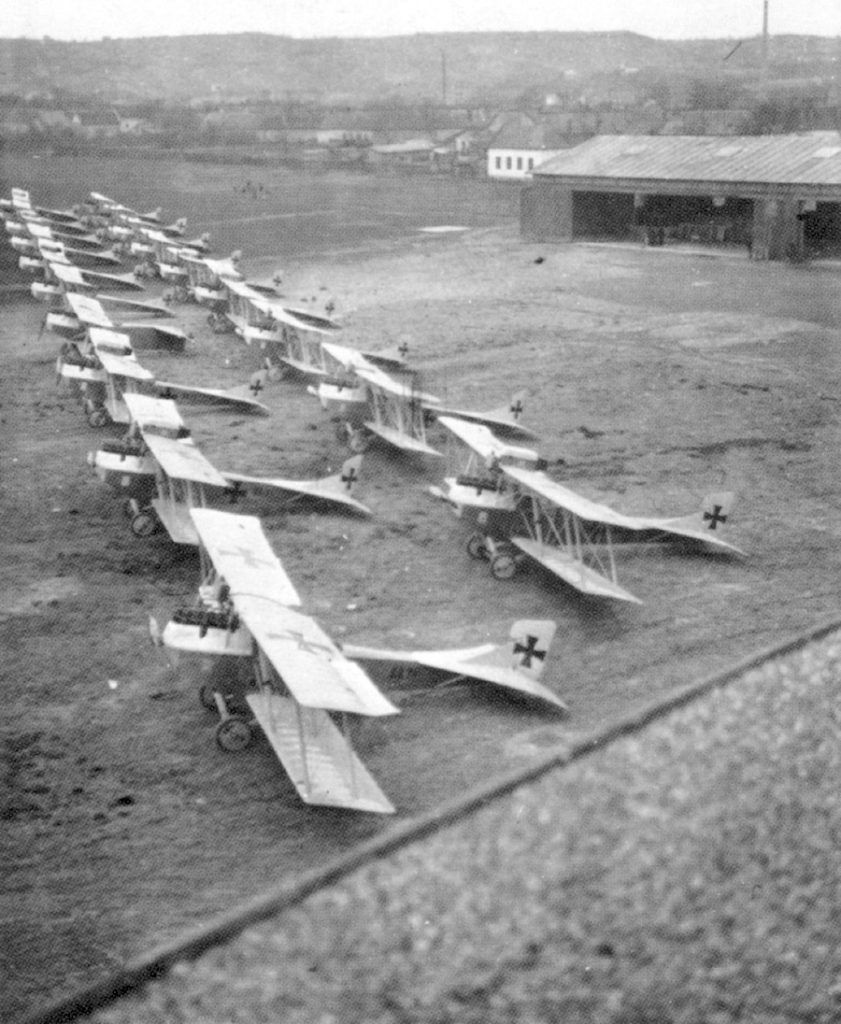
UFAG Brandenburg C.I aircraft in Albertfalva (Budapest ) in 1916

Data from Austro-Hungarian Army Aircraft of World War One

In addition to 84 aircraft built by Hansa-Brandenburg, Phönix Flugzeugwerke (400 C.I(Ph)), Ungarische Flugzeugfabrik A.G. (834 C.I(U)) and Aero (A-14, A-15, A-26) also made the type under licence in the following batches:

Phönix
(Brandenburg C.I(Ph))

- Series 26 with 120 kW (160 hp) Austro-Daimler
- Series 27 with 140 kW (190 hp) Austro-Daimler
- Series 29 with 160 kW (210 hp) Austro-Daimler
- Series 29.5, 129 (ex 23), 229 and 329 with 150 kW (200 hp) Hiero 6
- Series 429 with 170 kW (230 hp) Hiero 6

Ufag
(Brandenburg C.I(U))

- Series 61, 64, 67 and 68 with 120 kW (160 hp) Austro-Daimler
- Series 63 with 120 kW (160 hp) Mercedes D.III
- Series 269 with 150 kW (200 hp) Austro-Daimler
- Series 69 with 150 kW (200 hp) Hiero
- Series 169 with 160 kW (210 hp) Benz Bz.IVa
- Series 369 with 170 kW (230 hp) Hiero

Aero (Czechoslovakia) post-war

- Aero A.14 copy BA369 with Hiero N 169 kW, Aero A.15 copy BA369 with Hiero L 169 kW and Aero A.26 copy BA26 with Walter-built 138 kW (185 hp) BMW IIIa

Poland (post war)

- In 1919-1920, fifteen aircraft, differing in construction and engines, were assembled by the Poles in Lviv RPL-III workshops, and then in 1920-1924 some fifteen were made in Kraków workshops (known locally as Brandenburg K).

Arsenalul Aeronautic (Romania) post-war

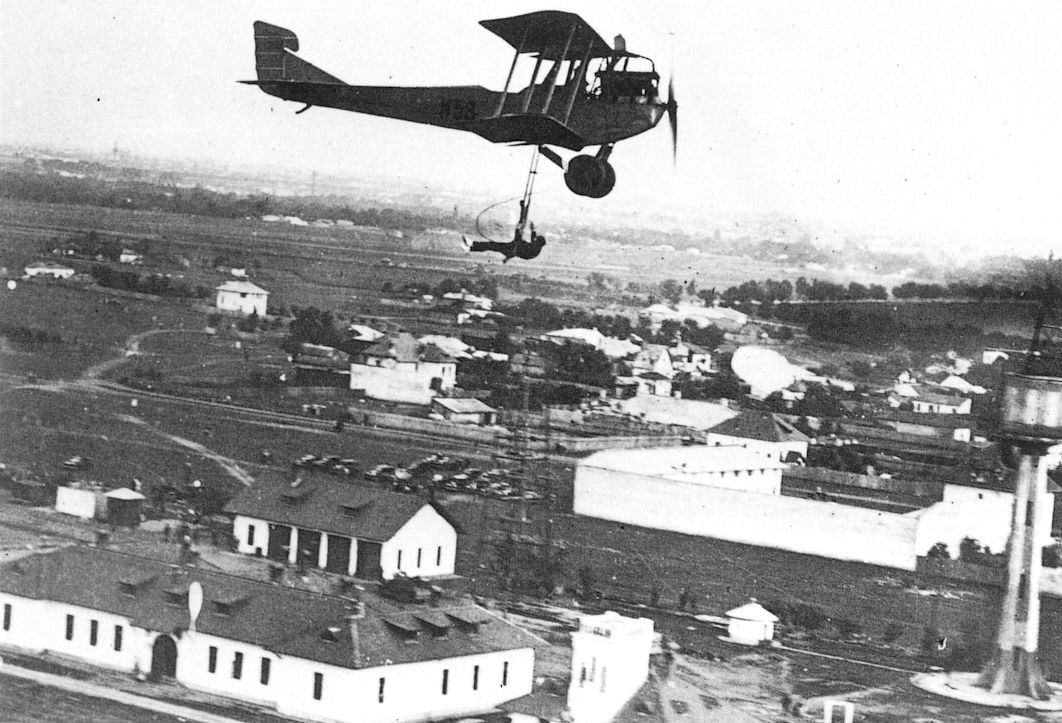
The Romanian built No. 58, one of the last surviving Hansa-Brandenburgs, used as a platform for mid-air stunts in 1936

- In the 1920s with the increase in need of training aircraft, the Romanian Ministry of War approved the construction of Hansa-Brandenburg C.I airplanes at Arsenalul Aeronautic from Cotroceni. The aircraft were powered by the Austro-Daimler 160 hp engine. It was the first large-scale aircraft production that took place in Romania. Between 1922 and 1923, a total of 120 Hansa-Brandenburg C.I were manufactured.

== Operational history ==
After World War I, in 1918, 22 original Hansa-Brandenburg C.I seized by the Poles were among the first aircraft of Polish Air Force. According to some publications, it was the first Polish aircraft to perform a combat flight on 5 November 1918, flown by Stefan Bastyr (others claim he flew Oeffag C.II). They were used in Battle of Lemberg and then Polish–Ukrainian War and Polish–Soviet War. Approximately 30 more aircraft were assembled or built by the Poles afterwards in Lviv and Kraków.

During the Hungarian–Romanian War, Romania used Hansa-Brandenburg C.I airplanes captured from the Hungarian Red Air Arm. By the end of the war, a total of 22 aircraft of this type were captured. The aircraft were used by the Romanian Air Force until the mid 1930s.

== Operators ==
Austria-Hungary

- Austro-Hungarian Imperial and Royal Aviation Troops

Poland

- Polish Air Force (inter-war)

Czechoslovakia

- Czechoslovak Air Force (inter-war)

Kingdom of Yugoslavia

- Royal Yugoslav Air Force - Postwar

Romania

- Romanian Air Force - Postwar

Hungarian Soviet Republic

- Hungarian Red Air Arm - Postwar

== Surviving aircraft and replicas ==
- Airworthy Hansa Brandenburg C.I replica in Austria

== Specifications (Brandenburg C.I(Ph) Series 29.5) ==
Data from Austro-Hungarian Army Aircraft of World War One

General characteristics

- Crew: 2
- Length: 8.37 m (27 ft 6 in)
- Upper wingspan: 12.30 m (40 ft 4 in)
- Lower wingspan: 11.70 m (38 ft 5 in)
- Height: 3.20 m (10 ft 6 in)
- Wing area: 38.4 m^{2} (413 sq ft)
- Empty weight: 805 kg (1,775 lb)
- Gross weight: 1,238 kg (2,729 lb)
- Powerplant: 1 × Hiero 6 water-cooled in-line piston engines, 150 kW (200 hp)
- Propellers: 2-bladed fixed pitch wooden propeller

Performance

- Maximum speed: 155–163 km/h (96–101 mph, 84–88 kn)
- Time to altitude: 1,000 m (3,300 ft) in 4 minutes 12 seconds

== See also ==
Aircraft of comparable role, configuration, and era

- Albatros C.I
- Armstrong Whitworth F.K.8
- Royal Aircraft Factory R.E.8

== Bibliography ==
- Munson, Kenneth - Bombers, Patrol and Reconnaissance Aircraft 1914 - 1919 ISBN 0 7537 0918 X
- Grosz, Peter M.; Haddow, George; Scheiner, Peter (2002) [1993]. Austro-Hungarian Army Aircraft of World War One. Boulder: Flying Machine Press. ISBN 1-891268-05-8.
- Morgała, Andrzej (1997). Samoloty wojskowe w Polsce 1918-1924 [Military aircraft in Poland 1918-1924] (in Polish). Warsaw: Lampart. ISBN 83-86776-34-X.
- Sankowski, Wojeich (July 1996). "Les Hansa Brandenburg C.I en Pologne" [The Hansa Brandenburg C.I in Poland]. Avions: Toute l'aéronautique et son histoire (in French) (40): 2–7. ISSN 1243-8650.
