= Oeffag C.II =

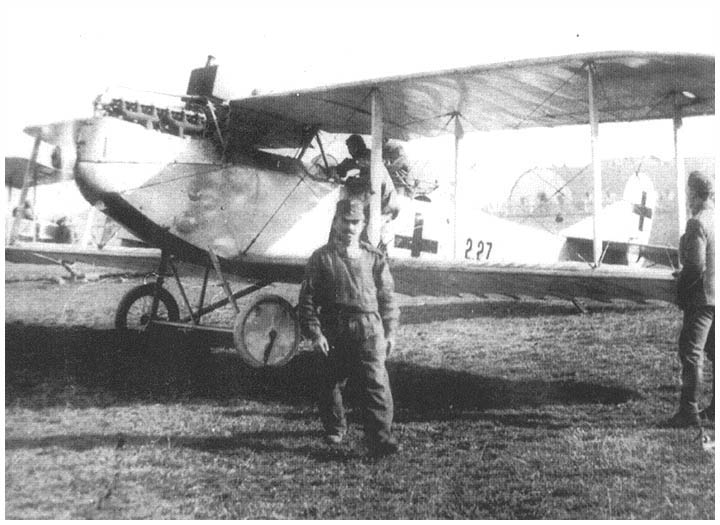

General information
- Type: Reconnaissance aircraft
- National origin: Austria-Hungary
- Manufacturer: Oeffag (Oesterreichische Flugzeugfabrik AG )
- Primary user: KuKLFT
- Number built: 64

History
- Introduction date: 1916
- First flight: 1916

The Oeffag C.II was a military reconnaissance aircraft produced in Austria-Hungary during World War I.

== Specifications ==
Data from Austro-Hungarian Army Aircraft of World War One

General characteristics

- Crew: Two, pilot and observer
- Length: 8.40 m (27 ft 7 in)
- Wingspan: 12.71 m (41 ft 8 in)
- Height: 3.27 m (10 ft 9 in)
- Wing area: 38 m^{2} (410 sq ft)
- Gross weight: 1,205 kg (2,657 lb)
- Powerplant: 1 × Austro-Daimler , 118 kW (160 hp)

Performance

- Maximum speed: 140 km/h (87 mph, 76 kn)
- Range: 400 km (250 mi, 220 nmi)
- Endurance: 6 hours
- Service ceiling: 3,200 m (10,500 ft)
- Rate of climb: 2.6 m/s (510 ft/min) to 1,000 m (3,300 ft)

Armament

- 1x 8 mm (0.315 in) Schwarzlose M.7/12 machine-gun
