= Hiero 6 =

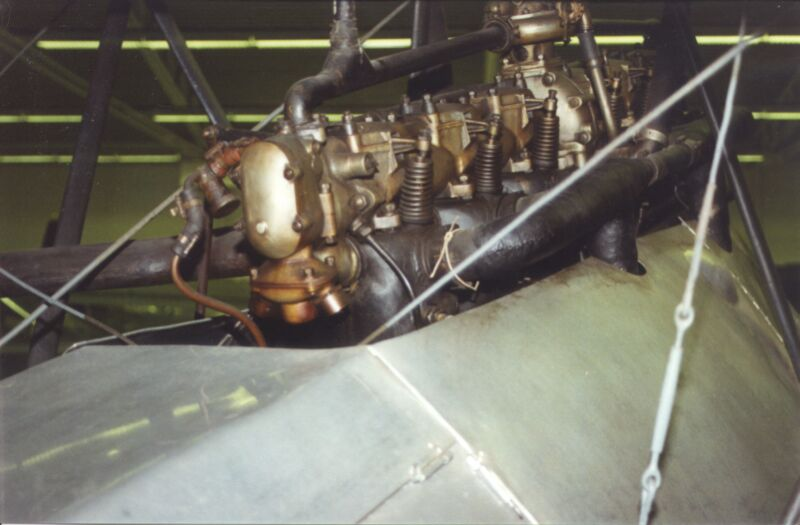
- Hiero 6 engine of an Austro-Hungarian Phönix J.1 fighter biplane in a Swedish museum
- Type: 6-cyl water-cooled in-line piston engine
- National origin: Austria
- Manufacturer: Hiero / Laurin & Klement Automobile Works
- Designer: Otto Hieronimus

In 1914 Otto Hieronimus manufactured the six-cylinder Hiero E, also known as the Hiero 6 engine which was derived from earlier 4-cylinder engines. The Hiero engine like the Austro-Daimler powered many of Austria's World War I aircraft. Hiero aircraft engines were designed by Otto Hieronimus, a famous Austrian auto racer of the early 1900s. His initial designs were liquid-cooled inline engines built by the Laurin & Klement Automobile Works of Austria.

== Design and development ==
The Hiero E had a 135 mm x 180 mm bore/stroke (15.46L / 943.4cuin) and delivered 200-230 hp. The engine had the typical features of an inline vertical 6-cylinder: aluminum crankcase, cast iron cylinders, one inlet and one exhaust valve per cylinder controlled by bars and rockers, as part of a "SOHC" (single overhead camshaft) valvetrain like the Mercedes D-series aviation engines of the German Empire, and dual ignition with two Bosch magnetos. During World War I, the highly regarded Hiero engines were built under license by Essler, Warschalowski & Company of Vienna and the Breitfeld-Daněk company of Czechoslovakia. A point of recognition of Hiero engines compared with other Central Powers OHC inlines is that the intake was on the right and the exhaust on the left. After World War I, production was continued by the Avia company and powered a number of their early aircraft.

== Variants ==
Hiero 145 hp
145 hp (108.1 kW) (probably designated Hiero B or Hiero C )
Hiero 185 hp
185 hp (138.0 kW) (probably designated Hiero D)
Hiero B
Hiero C
Hiero D
Hiero E
200 hp (149.1 kW) - 230 hp (171.5 kW)
Hiero L
Hiero N
230 hp (171.5 kW)

== Applications ==
- Aero A.14
- Letov Š-1
- Hansa-Brandenburg C.I
- Phönix D.I
- Ufag C.I
- Lloyd C.II

== Specifications (Hiero E) ==
Data from World Encyclopaedia of Aero Engines.

=== General characteristics ===
- Type: 6-cyl in-line Water-cooled
- Bore: 135 mm (5.31 in)
- Stroke: 180 mm (7.09 in)
- Displacement: 15,459 cc (943.4 cu in)
- Designer: Otto Hieronimus

=== Components ===
- Valvetrain: overhead-cam
- Cooling system: water

=== Performance ===
- Power output: 200 - 230 hp (149 - 172 hp)

== See also ==
Comparable engines

- Austro-Daimler 6
- BMW IIIa
- Liberty L-6
- Mercedes D.III
- SPA 6A

Related lists

- List of aircraft engines
