= Rodrig =

Rodrig may refer to the following:

- Rodrig, the Mauritian Creole name for the island of Rodrigues
- Rodrig Goliescu (1877–1942), Romanian inventor and engineer
- Rodrig Ivanovich, a fictional character in the play Invitation to a Beheading by Vladimir Nabokov
