= Escadrille Spa.112 =

- Active: 1914–1918
- Country: France
- Branch: French Air Service
- Type: Fighter Squadron
- Battle honours: Mentioned in dispatches

Escadrille Spa.112 (also known as Escadrille V.29, Escadrille VB.112, Escadrille F.112, and Escadrille N.112) was a French air force squadron active for the near-entirety of World War I. After serving until mid-1917 in various iterations of a bombing squadron, they were re-equipped with Nieuport fighters. With their Nieuports, and their subsequent SPADs, they destroyed 28 enemy airplanes by the ceasefire.

== History ==
Escadrille Spa.112 began its existence on 1 September 1914 as Escadrille V.29, the squadron designation reflecting its equipment with Voisin aircraft. On 18 December, they were tasked to support Ier Armee. On 15 May 1915, they were renamed Escadrille VB.112, meaning they must have been outfitted with new bomber airplanes. The escadrille was one of those concentrated into Groupe de Bombardement No. 4, a more powerful bombardment force.

The squadron fought in the Second Battle of Artois, and was Mentioned in dispatches on 25 July 1915. Afterwards, the squadron was disbanded within Groupe de Bombardement No. 4 on 20 November 1915, only to be reconstituted within Groupe de Bombardement No. 1. Then they were refitted with Farmans and redubbed Escadrille F.112. On 19 March 1916, the squadron moved to support IV Armee. On 20 March, it became part of a larger fighter unit, Groupe de Combat 15. On 11 June 1916, they were supplied with Nieuport fighters to become Escadrille N.112. Resupplied with SPAD fighters in December, they were renamed as Escadrille Spa.112.

On 10 January 1918, Escadrille Spa.112 was transferred to Groupe de Combat 16. The Groupe supported an array of field armies; this included assignment to the 1st American Army from 1 April to 10 September 1918 for the Battle of Saint-Mihiel. By the Armistice, the squadron was credited with 28 verified aerial victories.

== Commanding officers ==
- Captaine Sourdeau: 1 September 1914 - 18 December 1914
- Capitaine Gustave Ludmann: 18 December 1914
- Lieutenant Pierre Merat: 15 March 1916 - war's end

== Notable members ==
- Sous lieutenant Victor Régnier
- Sous lieutenant Fernand Henri Chavannes
- Sous lieutenant Lionel de Marmier

== Aircraft ==
- Voisin: 1 September 1914 - 15 May 1915
- Unknown type of bomber(s): 15 May 1915 - ?
- Farman: ? - 11 June 1916
- Nieuport fighters: 11 June 1916 - December 1916
- SPAD fighters: December 1916 - war's end
