= Chevillard =

Chevillard may refer to:

- Chevillard (meat), a French method of dealing with fat on meat in an abattoir.
- Chevillard, Ain, a commune in the Ain department of France
- Jean Chevillard (1618-1683)
- Maurice Chevillard, French aviator
- Éric Chevillard (born 1964)
- Camille Chevillard (1859–1923), French composer
