= Victor Régnier =

French World War I flying ace (1889–1961)

Victor François Marie Alexis Régnier
- Born: 21 February 1889; Avignon, France
- Died: Post 11 May 1966; Nice, France
- Military career
- Allegiance: France
- Branch: Flying service
- Rank: Sous lieutenant
- Unit: Escadrille N.112
- Awards: Légion d'honneur Croix de Guerre with four palmes and two etoiles de vermeil
- Other work: Returned to service during World War II

Sous Lieutenant Victor François Marie Alexis Régnier (1889–1961) was a World War I flying ace credited with five aerial victories.

== World War I ==
Victor Régnier was an experienced soldier when World War I began, having served in the artillery from 1910 through 1912. He was recalled for the war, only to be wounded on 29 March 1915 By late summer, he had switched to aviation. He served originally with a bomber squadron, but then was assigned to Escadrille N.112 as a Nieuport fighter pilot. He was commissioned in September 1916. He also scored his first victory in September 1916, on the ninth. He continued to score sporadically, with his fifth victory being an observation balloon on 6 April 1917. Shortly thereafter, he was seriously wounded. He never again served in a front line unit, although he stayed in service until war's end, and even survived a serious accident on 28 August 1918.

== Postwar ==
Régnier served in World War II, and was raised to Commander in the Légion d'honneur. His exact date of death is unknown, though he was still alive to correspond with aviation historian Norman Franks on 11 May 1966.
