= Bellegarde-en-Marche =

Commune in Nouvelle-Aquitaine, France

- Commune
- Coat of arms
- Location of Bellegarde-en-Marche
- Location within France Location within Nouvelle-Aquitaine
- Coordinates: 45°58′58″N 2°17′43″E
- Country: France
- Region: Nouvelle-Aquitaine
- Department: Creuse
- Arrondissement: Aubusson
- Canton: Aubusson
- Intercommunality: CC Marche et Combraille en Aquitaine

Government
  - Mayor (2020–2026): Jean-Pierre Bonnaud
- Area^{1}: 3.14 km^{2} (1.21 sq mi)
- Elevation: 603 m (1,978 ft)
- Highest elevation: 648 m (2,126 ft)
- Lowest elevation: 530 m (1,740 ft)
- Population (2023): 355
  - Density: 113/km^{2} (293/sq mi)
- Time zone: UTC+01:00 (CET)
  - Summer (DST): UTC+02:00 (CEST)
- INSEE/Postal code: 23020 /23190
- ^{1} French Land Register data, which excludes lakes, ponds, glaciers > 1 km^{2} (0.386 sq mi or 247 acres) and river estuaries.

Bellegarde-en-Marche (French pronunciation: [bɛlɡaʁd ɑ̃ maʁʃ], literally Bellegarde in Marche; Auvergnat: Belagarda) is a commune in the Creuse department in the Nouvelle-Aquitaine region in central France.

== History ==
Bellegarde is a bastide (fortified village) created in the 13th century, during the defence of the Limousin against the English who then disputed territory in Western metropolitan France (Guyenne). King Louis VIII, fighting against Henry III, the English king, decided to establish a forward military post in Bellegarde. It took its current name in 1892.

- It is the former capital of the Franc-alleu, a medieval free-trade zone at a crossroads between two powerful regions: Auvergne and Limousin.
- In the wake of Aubusson and Felletin, tapestry workshops were set up in the city during and after the Renaissance. Bellegarde was even considered for a time a "rival" of Aubusson and Felletin in this activity.

== Geography ==
A farming village situated some 5 miles (8.0 km) northeast of Aubusson at the junction of the D9, D39, D40a and the D988 roads.

== Population ==
Historical population
Year	Pop.	±% p.a.
1968	413	—
1975	417	+0.14%
1982	407	−0.35%
1990	425	+0.54%
1999	425	+0.00%
2007	432	+0.20%
2012	398	−1.63%
2017	409	+0.55%
2023	355	−2.33%
Source: INSEE

== Sights ==
- The church, dating from the nineteenth century.
- A sixteenth-century tower.
- Some very old houses.
- Remains of a feudal castle.
- The chapel of Notre-Dame, dating from the nineteenth century.
- Tour Jacqueron, a defensive tower marking the East end of the old Bastide.
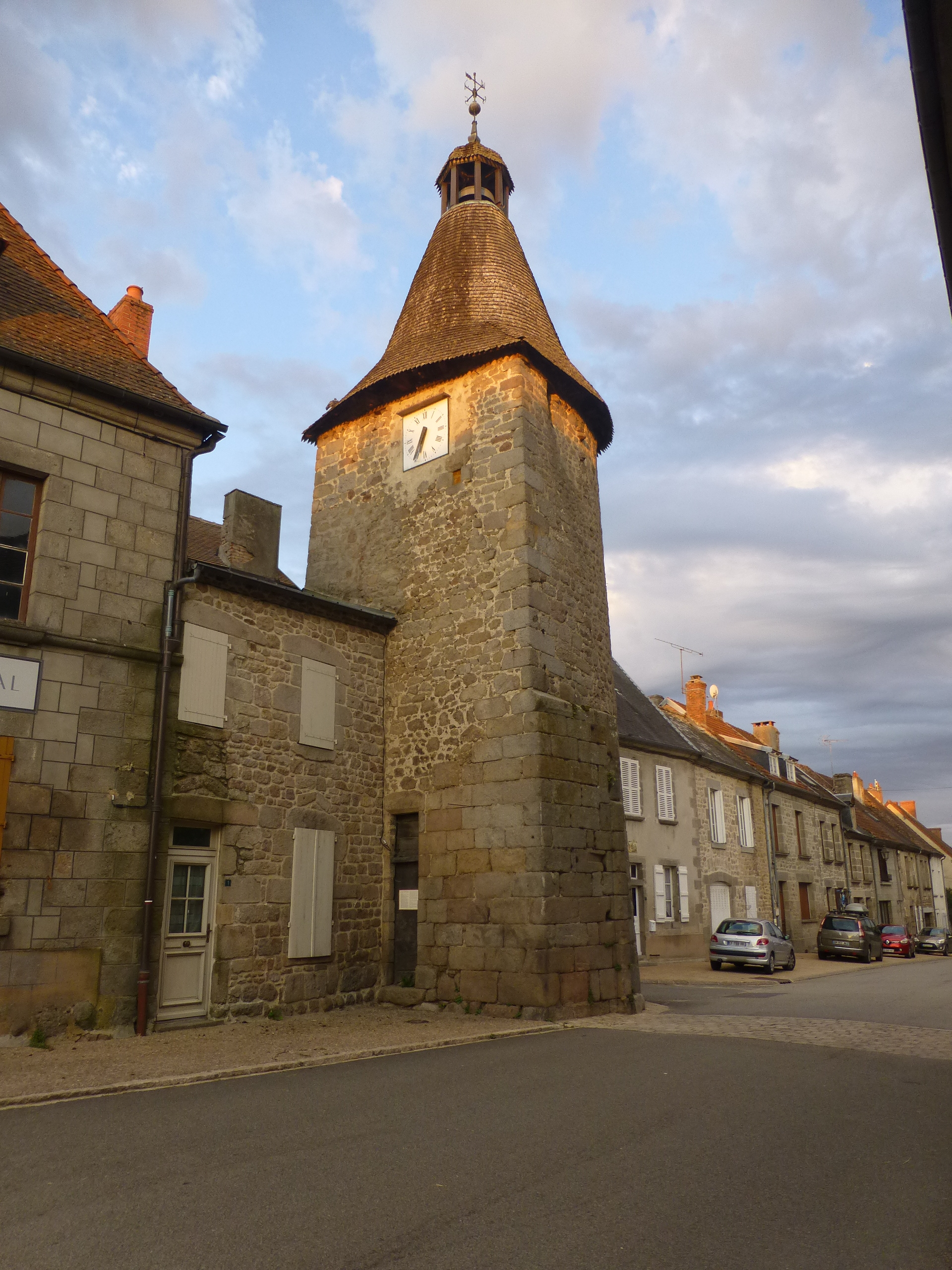
Tour de l'horloge (clock tower)

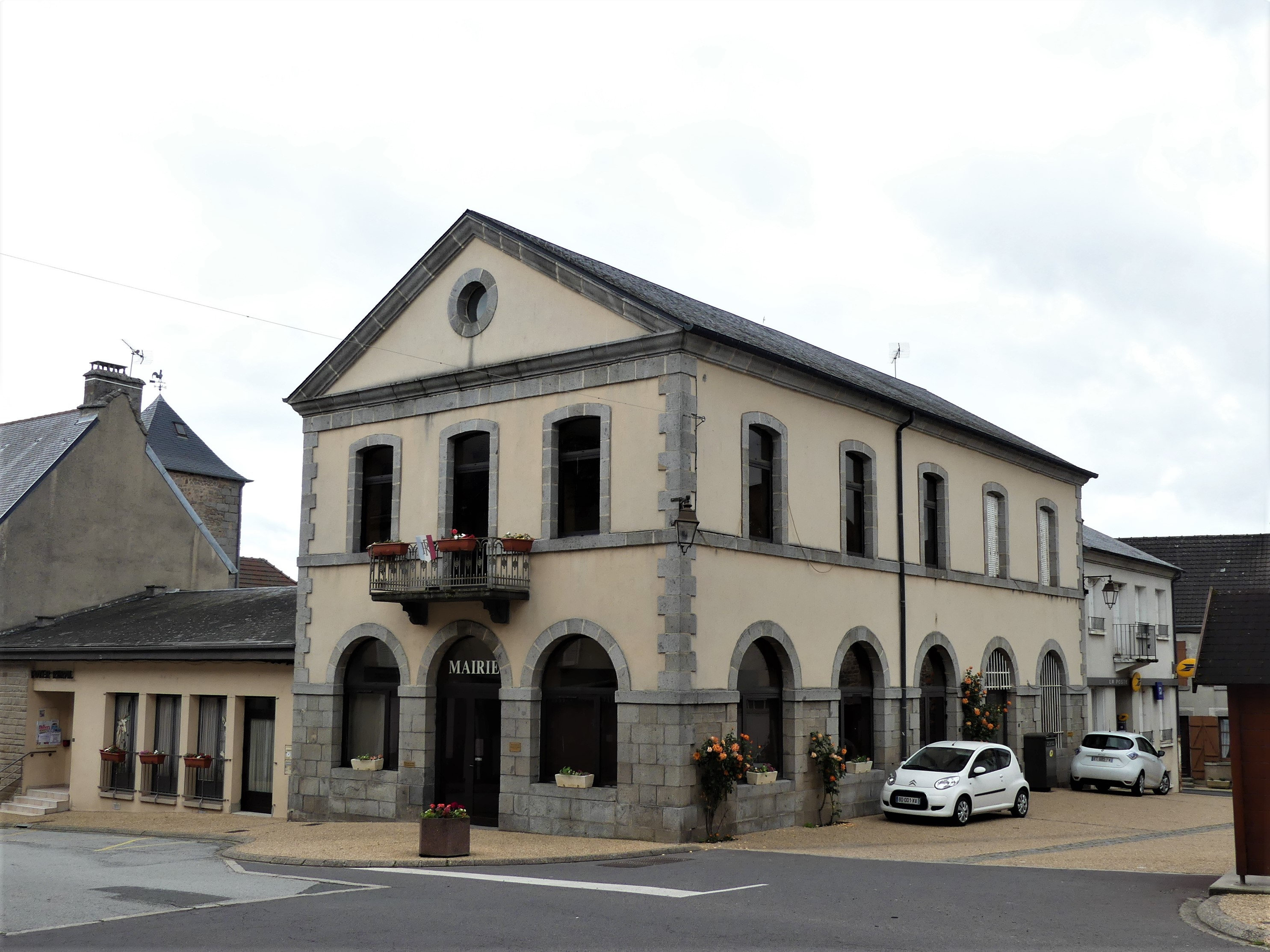
Mairie (Townhall) and Post Office

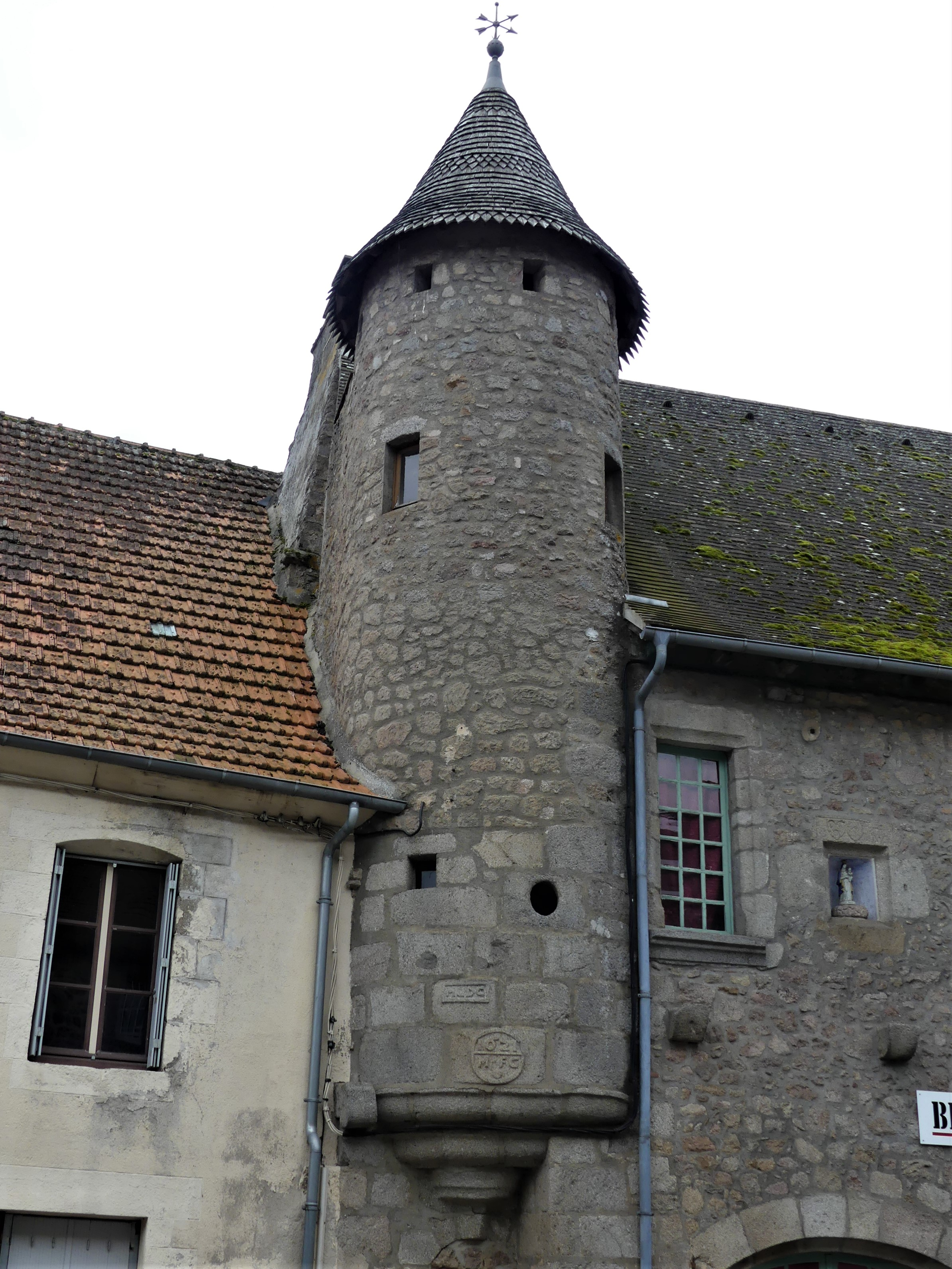
Turett from the Chevanne House (Maison Chevanne), which is a local Air Memorial Museum, a tourism office and a public library

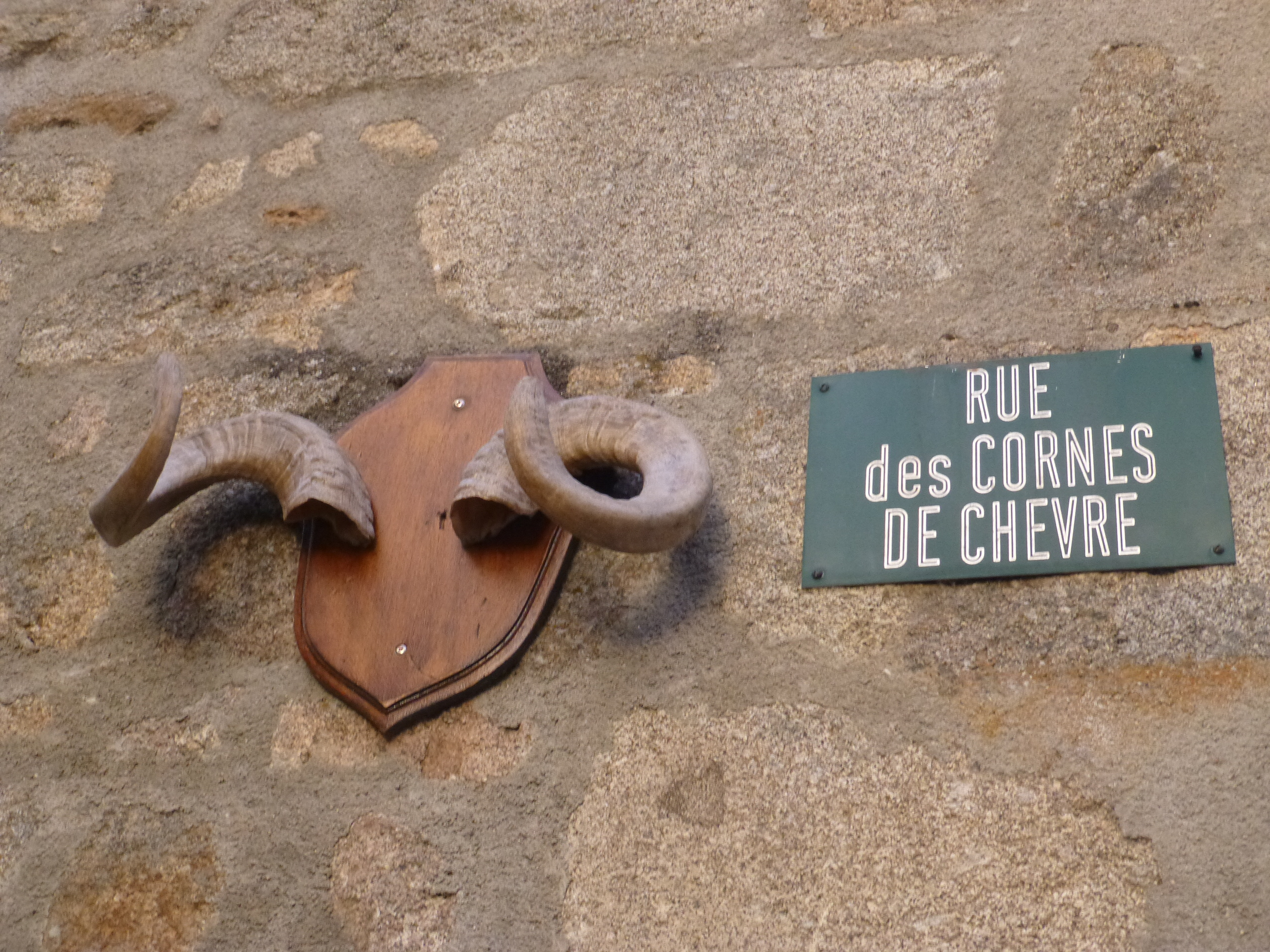
Bellegarde-en-Marche has a long history of goat-eating, one of its streets was paved with goats' horns

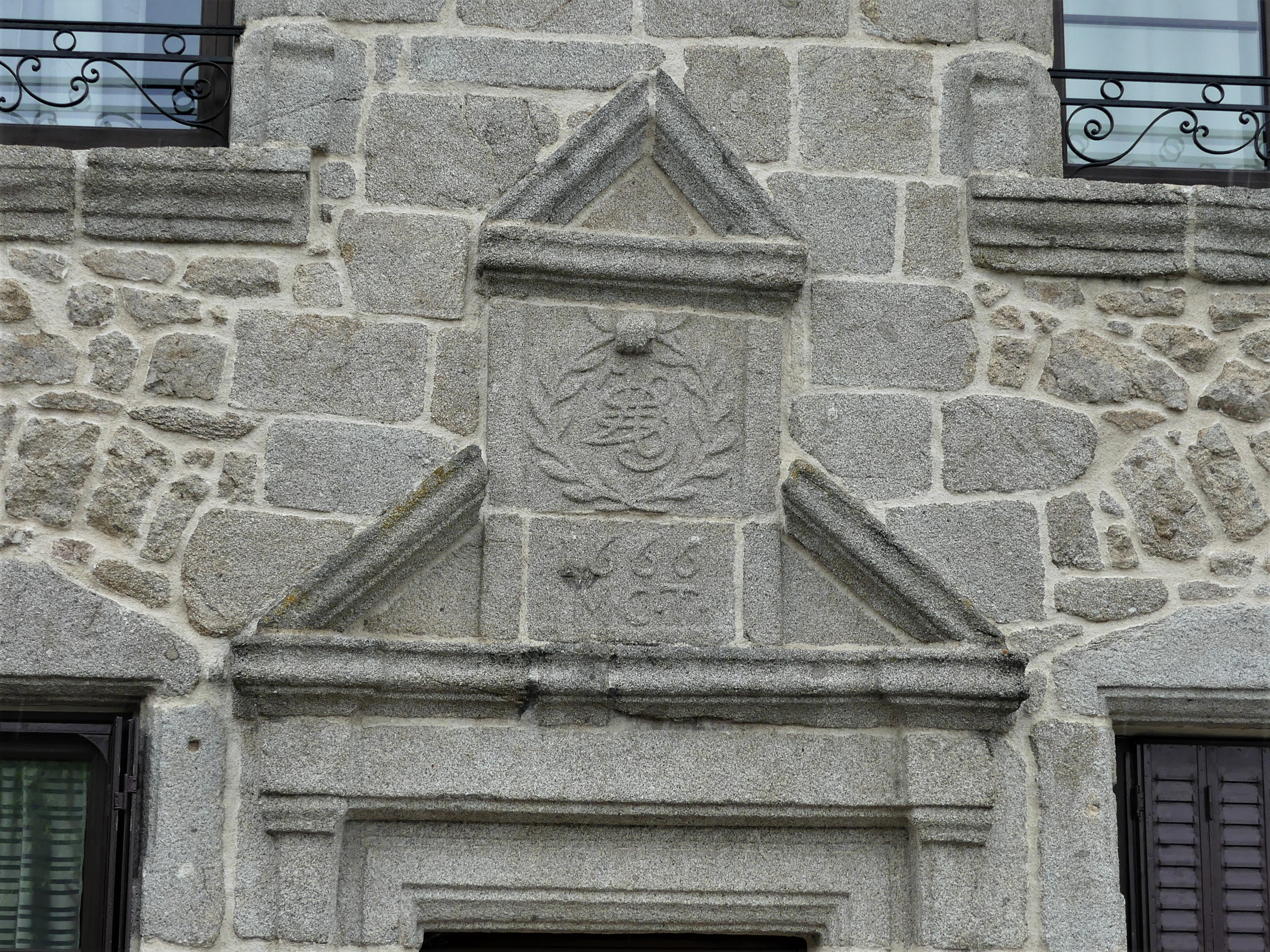
As Bellegarde developed in the 17th century, new houses were built. This one is dated 1666

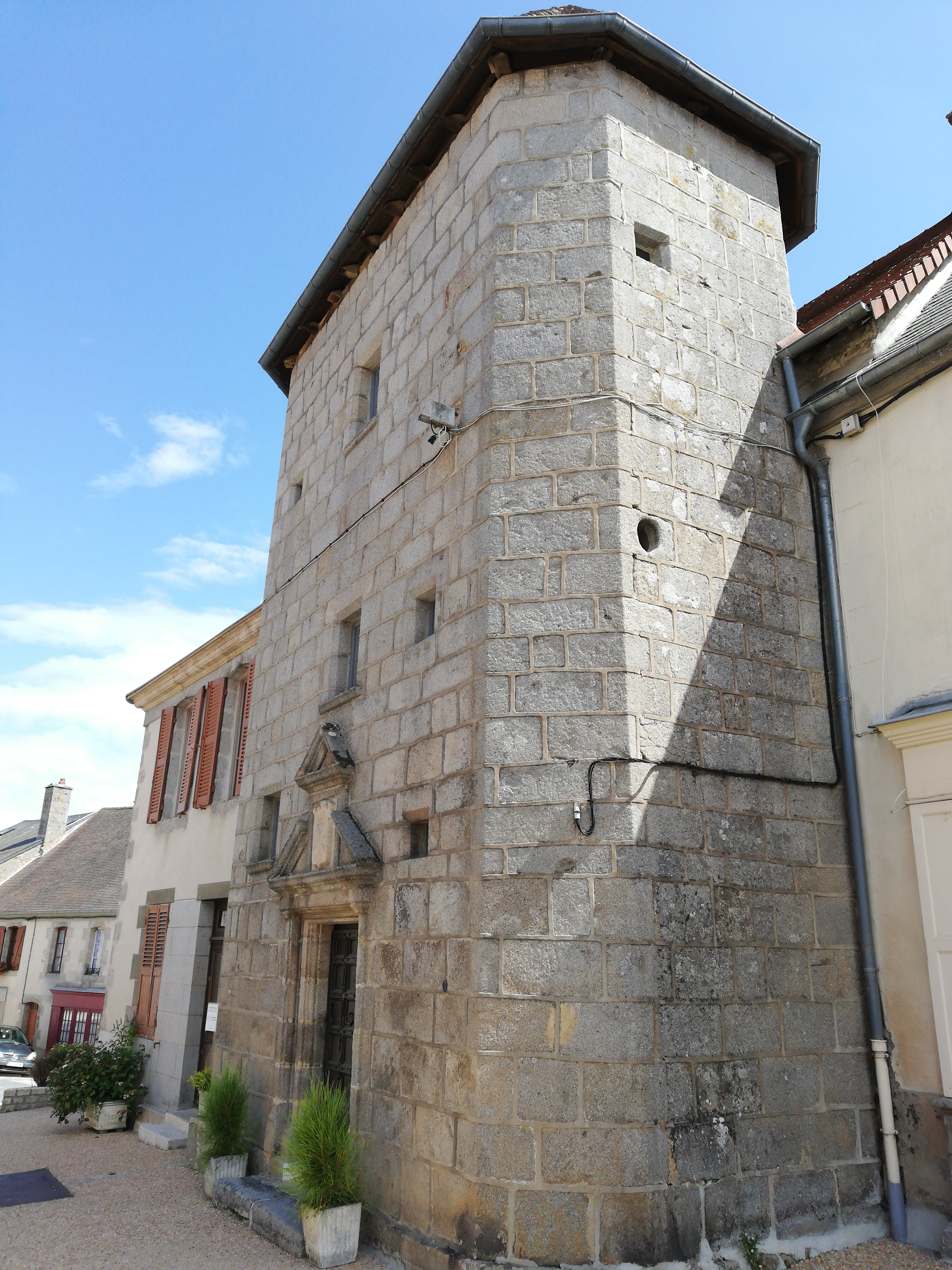
Tour jacqueron, the East end of the old village

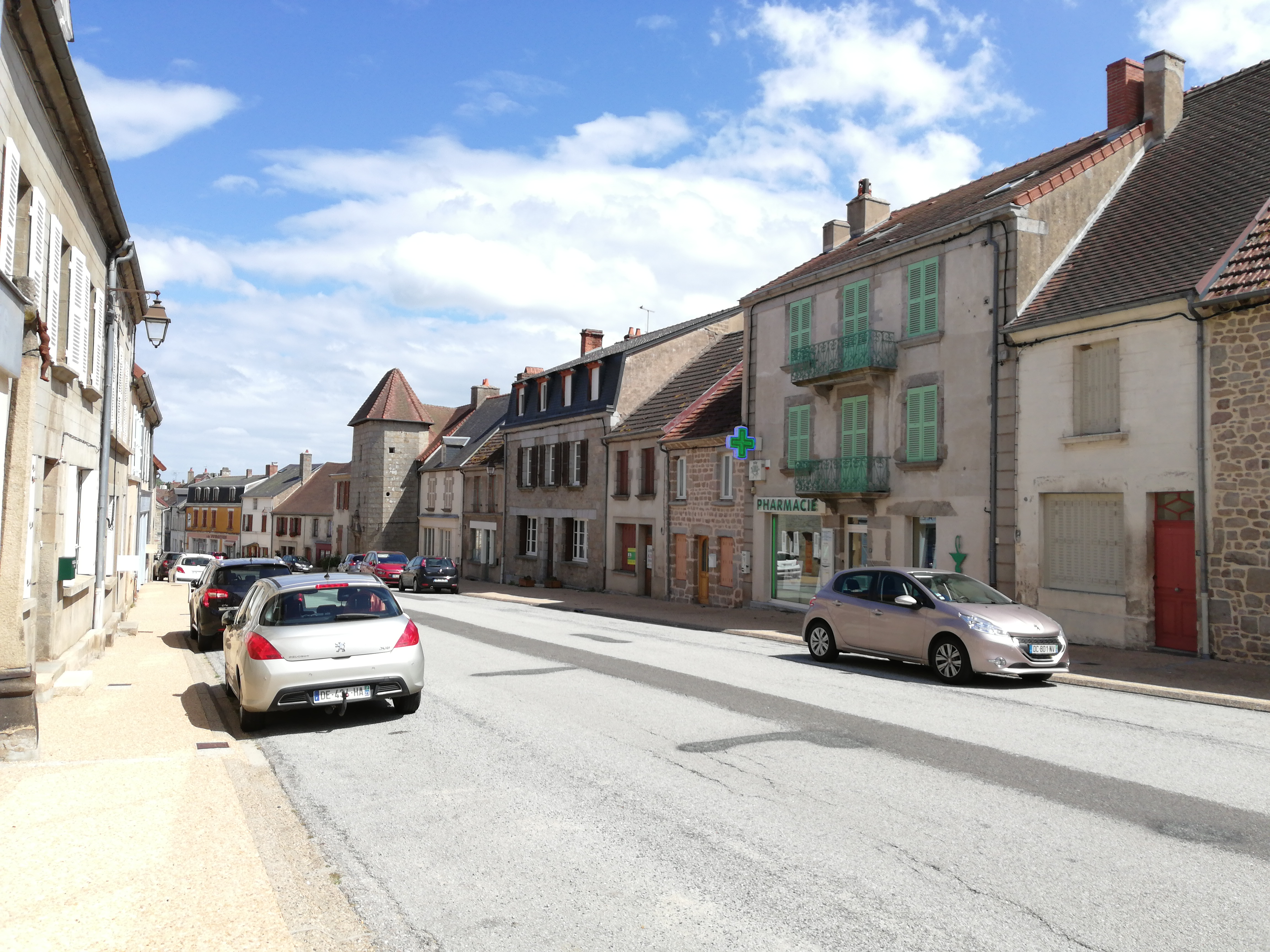
Grand Rue ("main street") with its pharmacy

== Notable people ==
- François Goubert (1735–1815), was a clergyman and a politician. Prefect of Aubusson in 1762, he became parish priest in Bellegarde in 1788 and official of Chénérailles. He was elected deputy of the Creuse clergy in 1789.
- François Denhaut (1877–1952), an early French aviator & engineer who invented and tested a type of flying boat, died here.
- Lionel de Marmier (1897–1944), born in Bellegarde-en-Marche, pilot of the French Air Force and resistance fighter, a figure of free France.

== International relations ==
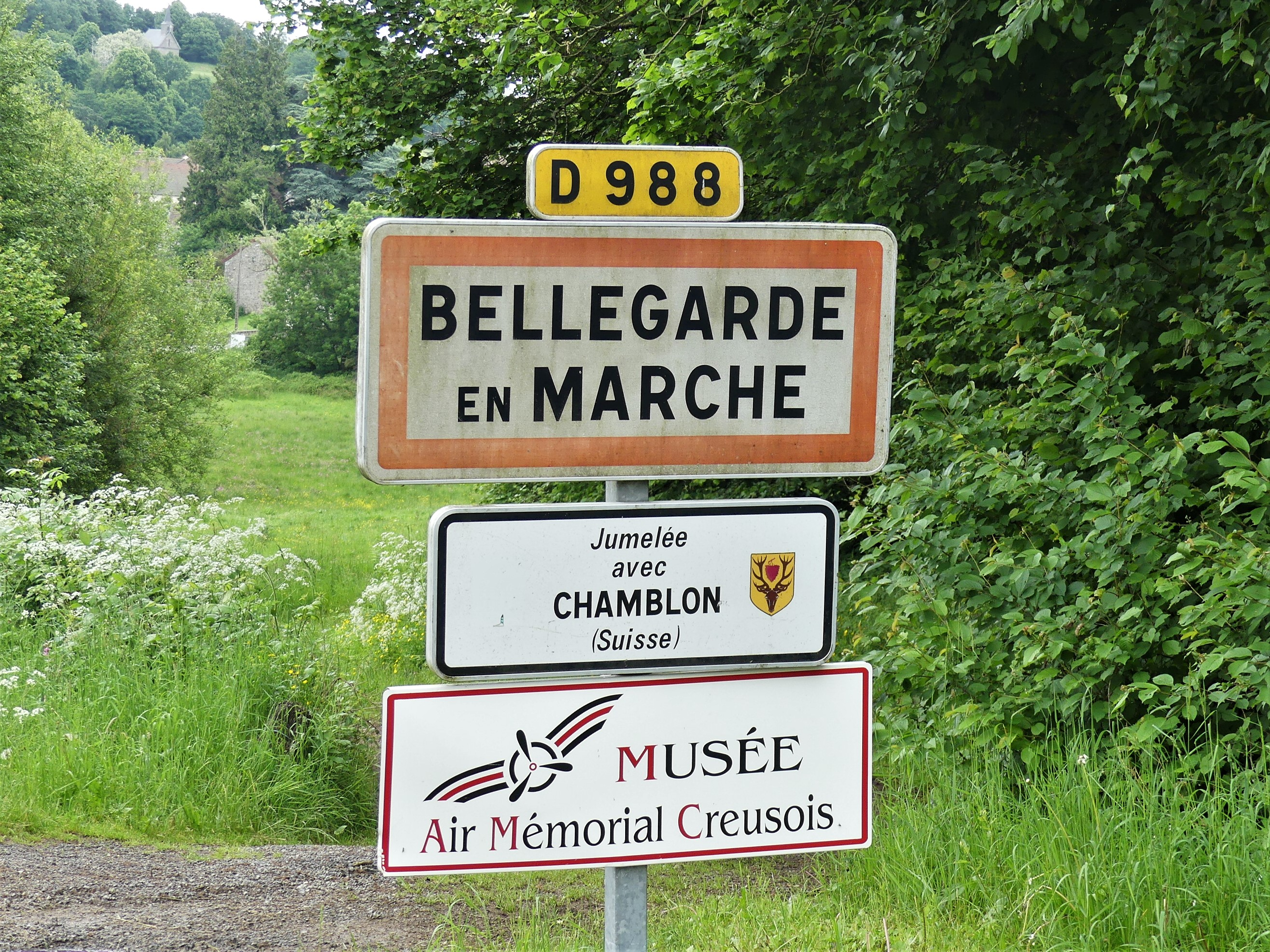
Entry of the commune, panels indicating its twinning with its Swiss counterpart, and its Air Museum

Bellegarde-en-Marche is twinned with:

- Chamblon, Switzerland

== See also ==
- Communes of the Creuse department
