= Port-Aviation =

Historic airfield in France

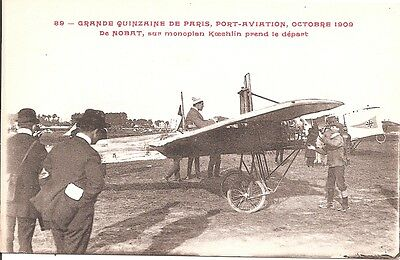
- The Grande Quinzaine de Paris at Port-Aviation in October 1909.
- IATA: none; ICAO: none

Summary
- Location: Viry-Châtillon, Frane
- Opened: May 23, 1909; 117 years ago
- Closed: 1918; 108 years ago
- Coordinates: 48°40′41″N 002°21′54″E

Map
- Location within France Location within Île-de-France (region)

Port-Aviation was an airfield in the commune of Viry-Châtillon in Seine-et-Oise (now in Essonne), France. It operated as a popular air racing and aviation exhibition venue and hosted civilian flight schools from its opening in 1909 until the start of World War I in 1914, then as a training center for military pilots during the war. Situated on land prone to flooding, it closed in 1918. In its earliest years it was an internationally important aviation center. Although designed as an aviation event venue rather than as a true airport or aerodrome, Viry-Châtillon claims for it the title of "world's first organized aerodrome."

Although Port-Aviation was located entirely within Viry-Châtillon rather than on the territory of either Juvisy-sur-Orge or Savigny-sur-Orge, the press and post card publishers habitually – to the consternation of the civic leaders of Viry-Châtillon – referred to it as Juvisy Airfield (or variations such as Juvisy Aerodrome or simply Juvisy) or sometimes as Savigny Airfield because the Juvisy and Savigny-sur-Orge railroad stations served it; in fact, a sign at Juvisy station referred to Port-Aviation as "Juvisy Airfield." As a result, the airfield often is referred to as "Juvisy Airfield" by historians and the general public.

Port-Aviation was the site or origin of many record-breaking or otherwise historic flights and aerobatic feats, and a number of aviation firsts took place there, such as the first air race, the first flight with two passengers, and the first inverted airplane flight, as well as only the second aerobatic loop in history. The first airplane with a tubular fuselage, the first flying boat, and early parachutes were tested at Port-Aviation. Tragic firsts also occurred there: The first death of a pilot in a crash while at the controls of an airplane and the first death of a person on the ground killed by a falling airplane both took place at Port-Aviation.

After Port-Aviation closed, its land became a housing development. The housing district constructed on the site of the former airfield also is called Port-Aviation.

== History ==
=== Origins, construction, and design ===
In the early 20th century, when aviation was regarded as a sport for daredevils, aviation pioneers made their early public flights in the Grand Paris (Greater Paris) region from Issy-les-Moulineaux, Vincennes, and the Château de Bagatelle. Spectators observed them both from grandstands and while swarming around the field in a circus atmosphere. In all cases, aviators had to borrow or rent venues designed or intended for other purposes; at Issy-les-Moulineaux and the Château de Bagatelle, the flights took place at racetracks not designed for aviation, and at Issy-les-Moulineaux and Vincennes flights took place on fields the French Army used for maneuvers and had to be scheduled so as not to interfere with military events.

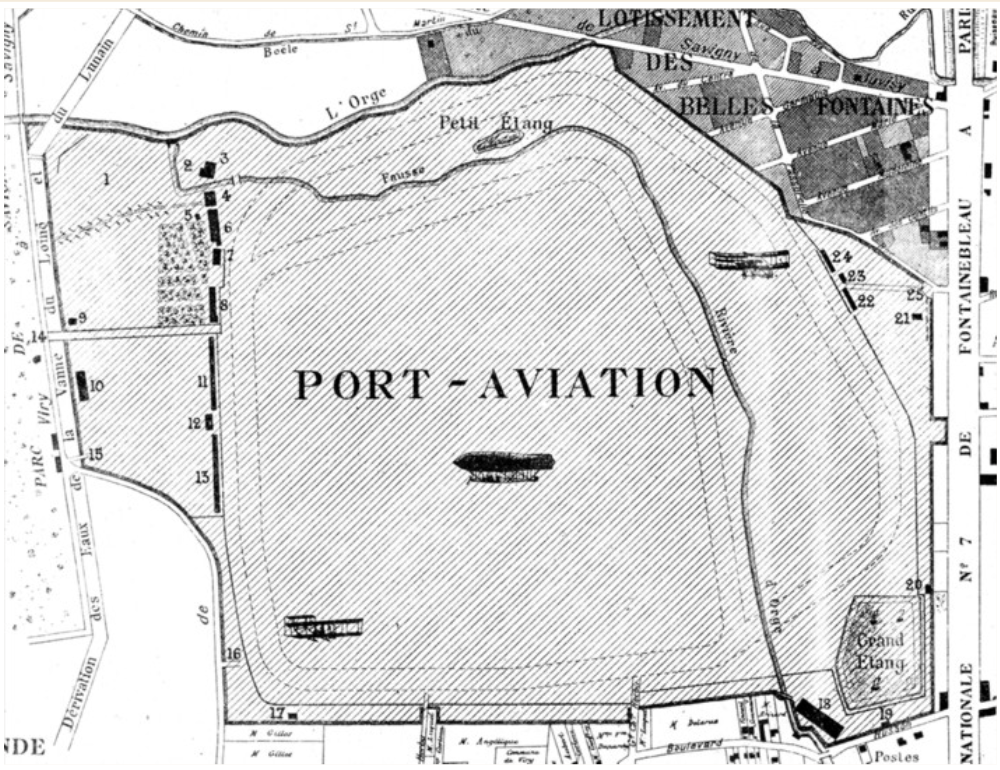
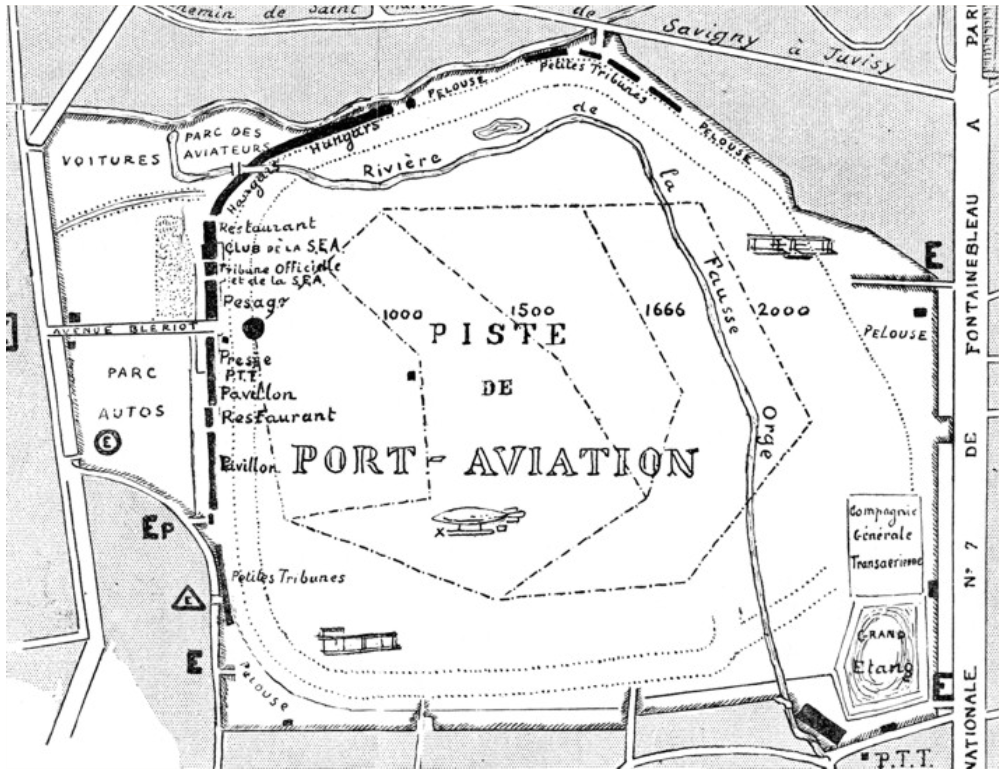
Plans of Port-Aviation in early 1909 (left) and in autumn 1909 (right), both looking northwest. The plan at right shows the four race courses marked on the airfield. Note the Grand Etang (Great Pond) in the eastern corner of the venue (at lower right in each plan) and the two branches of the Orge, one running along the northwest perimeter (at top of each plan) and the other across the airfield itself.
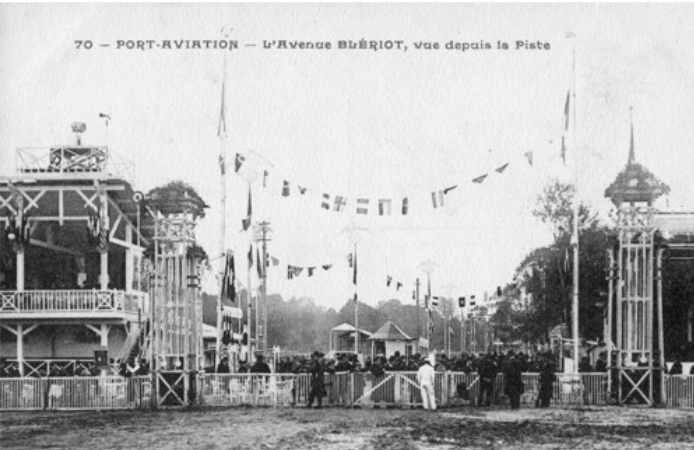
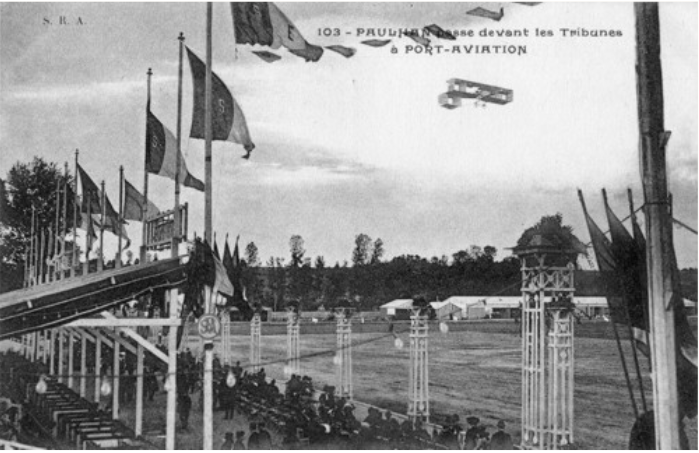
LEFT: The main entrance on the Avenue Blériot on 1 August 1909. RIGHT: The grandstands, expanded and decorated for the Grande Quinzaine de Paris in October 1909.

Seeking a better venue to host aviation events in the Grand Paris region, the Société d’Encouragement à l’Aviation (Society for the Encouragement of Aviation) was formed on 30 July 1908 to establish the world's first true airfield, designed specifically for the use of aviators, as well as the world's first aviation school and first aviation competition. The Society formed the Compagnie de l'Aviation (Aviation Company) to operate the airfield and leased cultivated land from two families in the vicinity of the towns of Viry and Châtillon, about 20 kilometres (12.4 mi) south of the center of Paris. Situated on a perfectly flat 100-hectare (247-acre) plain in a low valley and bisected by the Orge, the land was sheltered from the wind by nearby hills along the banks of the Seine.

The Society for the Encouragement of Aviation called upon the French government's chief architect, Guillaume Tronchet, to design and build what became Port-Aviation and organize the facilities necessary for it to function properly as an aerodrome. Tronchet designed Port-Aviation not as a true airport or aerodrome, but rather as a racecourse for airplanes at a time when airplanes generally flew at an altitude of around 10 metres (33 ft) in competitions and only recently had become reliably capable of making turns. Gabriel Voisin, an architect from Juvisy-sur-Orge, drew up and approved the airfield's race courses. Construction began on 15 October 1908.

Port-Aviation had a 4-kilometre (2.5-mile) elliptical track encompassing a 3-kilometre (1.9 mi) circular grass airfield and stands that could seat 7,000 spectators. When the airfield opened, it contained three marked race courses, of 1,000 metres (3,281 ft), 1,500 metres (4,921 ft), and either 1,645.6 metres (5,399 ft) or 1,666.66 metres (5,468 ft), according to different sources. A fourth course of 2,000 metres (6,562 ft) was added in the autumn of 1909. A signals mast — sometimes considered the ancestor of the airport control tower — stood in the center of the airfield. The grounds included an officials' booth at the start line for races, airplane hangars, an airship hangar, 32 repair and construction sheds, an airplane exhibition and sales hall, a central telephone and telegraph office (with a direct line to London, another to Berlin, and ten to Paris), a post office, a two-story press building, an infirmary, a hotel and reception area for distinguished visitors, a restaurant and buffet, bars, tennis courts, a car park, and the Grand Etang (Great Pond), a body of water in the eastern corner of the property that could accommodate seaplanes. Structures throughout the venue were decorated with depictions of eagles, vultures, and other birds and birds of prey. The Orge, a tributary of the Seine, split into two branches at the airfield, one of which ran along Port-Aviation's northwestern perimeter and the other across the northwestern, northern, and northeastern portions of the airfield itself.

Port-Aviation was served by two nearby railroad stations. Juvisy station, located less than 1 kilometre (0.6 mi) away in Juvisy-sur-Orge, served the general public. Distinguished visitors to Port-Aviation usually arrived at Savigny-sur-Orge station, which lay 900 metres (980 yd) away in Savigny-sur-Orge.

=== 1908–1909 ===
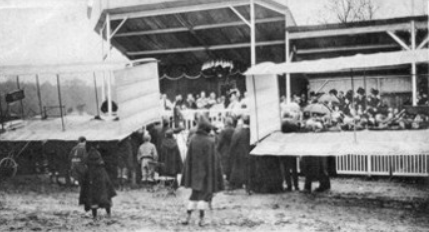
Archbishop of Paris Léon-Adolphe Amette blesses Port-Aviation and two airplanes on 1 April 1909.

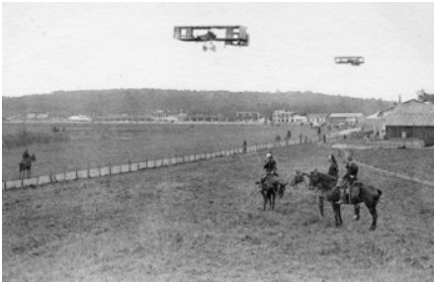
A 1909 view looking south across Port-Aviation during an early aviation meet. Hangars and other buildings are at right, and the grandstands are in the distance.

The first flights took place at Port-Aviation in November 1908 after the Ligue National Aérienne (National Aviation League) opened a flying school there on 1 November operating two Voisin airplanes; its instructor was Ferdinand Ferber and Igor Sikorsky enrolled at the school for flying lessons. Due to construction delays and unpredictable weather, Port-Aviation's official opening was delayed from 5 December to 10 December 1908, then to 10 January 1909, and then again to 1 April 1909. Meanwhile, tobacco, pharmacy, candy, and shoeshine kiosks, ladies' hairdresser shops, barbershops, shops selling aerial toys and post cards, and bars opened along the road leading into the main entrance of Port-Aviation. On 1 April, Archbishop of Paris Léon-Adolphe Amette blessed the airfield and two airplanes in a ceremony at Port-Aviation, but a hard rain again prevented flying and forced another postponement.

Port-Aviation finally opened on 23 May 1909, when 30,000 spectators arrived to see the world's first heavier-than-air air race, the Prix de Lagatinerie. Nine pilots entered the competition, which required entrants to complete ten 1.2-kilometre (0.75 mi; 0.65 nmi) laps around two pylons positioned 600 metres (1,969 ft) apart in the fastest time or, if no one completed ten laps, to travel the greatest distance. Only four pilots — Léon Delagrange, Ferdinand Ferber (under the pseudonym "F. de Rue"), Alfred de Pischof, and Henri Rougier — actually showed up for the race. On a very hot day, the crowd — told flying would begin at 2:00 p.m. but entertained only by a two-hour kite competition that began at 2:30 p.m. — dwindled during a 3-hour 45-minute delay due to unfavorable winds. At 4:15 p.m., Delagrange rolled out his Voisin biplane to give spectators something to see, and frustrated members of the crowd poured onto the airfield and surrounded him. He flew a lap of the field at 5:15 p.m. to entertain them. At 5:45 p.m. those who remained finally saw the beginning of the race. Only Rougier and Delagrange managed to take off, and neither of them completed ten laps. However, Delagrange had the last and longest flight, finishing at around 7:20 p.m. after covering slightly more than five laps at an altitude ranging from 5 metres (16.5 feet) on his first lap to 15 metres (49 ft) on later laps, and was declared the winner. He had flown 5.8 kilometres (3.6 mi; 3.1 nmi) in 10 minutes 18 seconds, and the crowd raised him in triumph after he landed. His average speed was calculated as 33.75 kilometres per hour (20.97 mph), but this was based on the distance between the two pylons multiplied by the number of laps he flew between them, not the actual distance he flew, which was considerably farther and would have resulted in the calculation of a higher average speed.

Port-Aviation subsequently drew ever-increasing and enthusiastic weekend crowds as it hosted a series of minor flying events, and a festive atmosphere prevailed. Crowds were so large that the railway operator serving the nearby rail stations, the Compagnie d'Orléans (Orleans Company), found itself incapable of handling them — a problem which arose on 23 May and continued during the season — leading to passengers waiting for hours for a train and sometimes rioting in the stations and on the trains themselves. On the airfield, Delagrange, Ferber (again as "de Rue"), and Rougier raced again on 30 May 1909, competing to have the fastest lap around the same two-pylon course on which they had competed on 23 May; Delagrange, who made three flights during the day, reached an altitude of 15 metres (49 ft) on one three-lap flight and in an earlier two-lap flight reached a height of 12 metres (39 ft) and posted the winning single-lap time of 1 minute 40.6 seconds, while Ferber came in second at 1 minute 41.6 seconds. From 31 May through 3 June 1909, Port-Aviation hosted the Prix Stern, a four-day competition in which pilots attempted to post the best time for one lap around a square course of one kilometre (0.62 mi) with four pylons set 250 metres (820 ft) apart; the two fastest laps both took place on the first day, when Delagrange flew at 15 metres (49 ft) and posted a time of 1 minute 18.6 seconds at an average speed calculated at 45.8 kilometres per hour (28.5 mph) and Ferber (as "de Rue") finished a lap in 1 minute 24.0 seconds, flying at an altitude of 8 to 10 metres (26 to 33 ft).

On 12 June 1909, three people flew in an airplane for the first time in history, as Louis Blériot lifted off from Port-Aviation in a monoplane, carrying Alberto Santos-Dumont and Heraclio Fournier as passengers. Charles de Lambert made a flight of 12 minutes 53 seconds in a Wright Model A biplane on 13 June 1909, and Paul Tissandier experimented unsuccessfully with a Wright biplane on 3 July 1909.

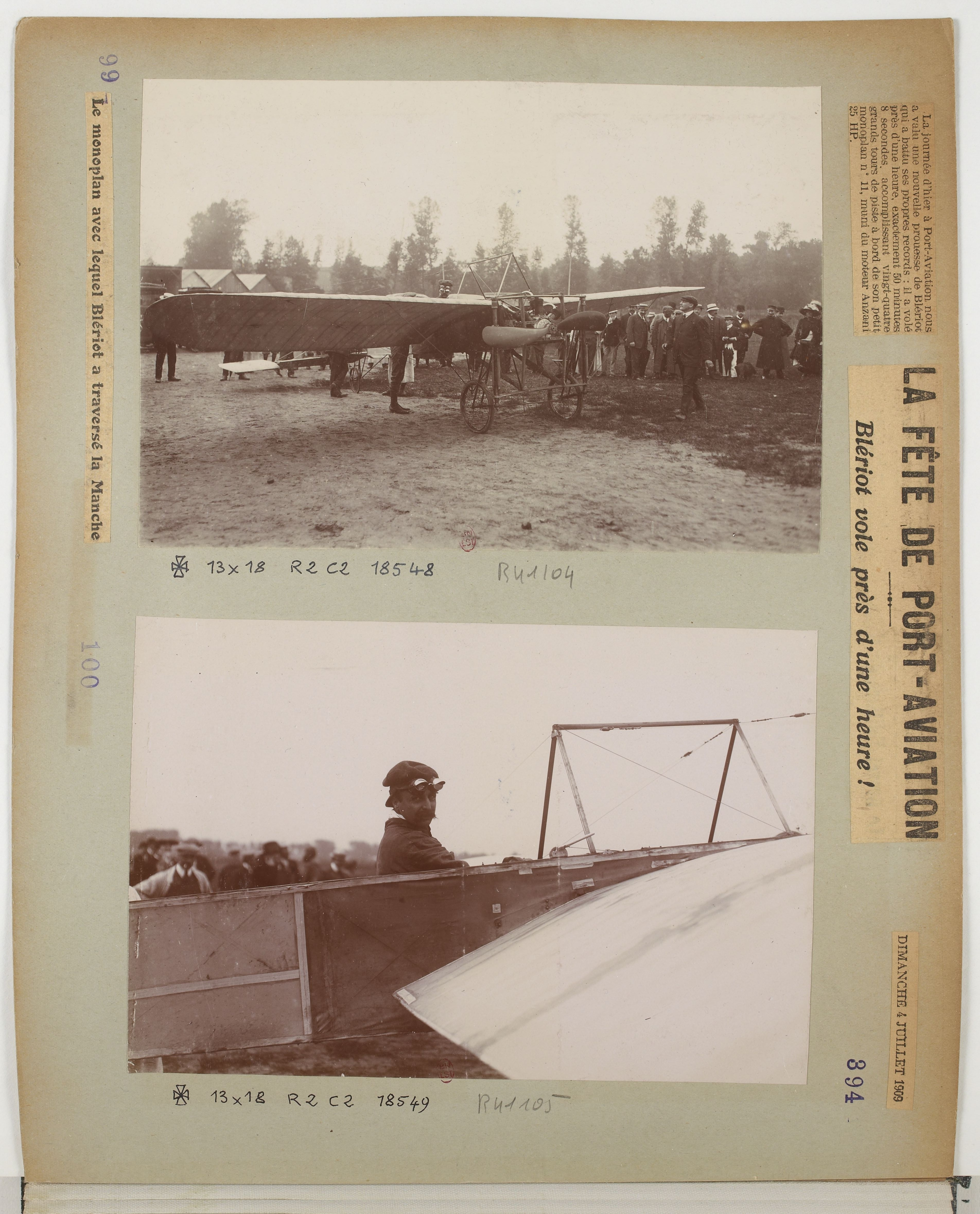
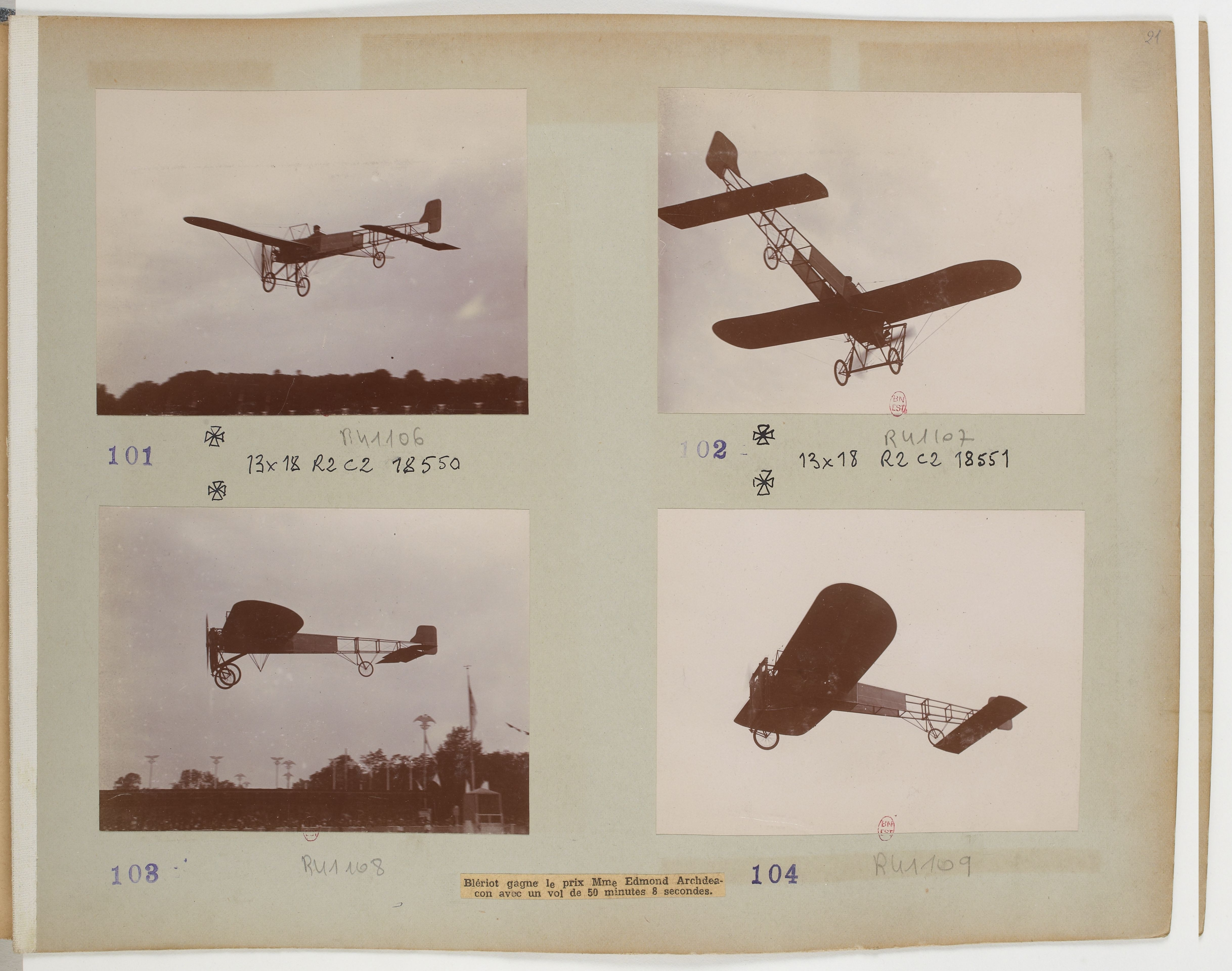
Louis Blériot in his Blériot XI at Port-Aviation on 4 July 1909.

At a charitable event for victims of an earthquake in Midi-Pyrénées that drew 10,000 spectators to Port-Aviation on 4 July 1909, Alfred Boulanger ascended to 500 metres (1,640 ft) in a hot air balloon and Louis Blériot circled the runway 24 times in 50 minutes 8 seconds to test the fuel endurance of his Blériot XI monoplane, which he used three weeks later to make the first airplane flight across the English Channel. Tissandier had a more successful outing on 14 July 1909 than he had on 3 July, covering two-and-a-half laps of the field, a distance of about 5 kilometres (3.1 mi), at an altitude of 6 metres (20 ft).

On 1 August 1909, the road leading onto the airfield at its main entrance was named Avenue Blériot in honor of Louis Blériot for his flight across the English Channel, and a bust of him was raised at Port-Aviation. During an aerial celebration of Blériot and his achievement that day, Louis Gaudart completed three laps of the track, a distance of 5 kilometres (3.1 mi), in 7 minutes 14 seconds, making the first lap at an altitude of 30 metres (98 ft), the second at 50 metres (164 ft), and the third at 80 metres (262 ft), thrilling the crowd by flying over the stands.

Tragedy struck at Port-Aviation on 7 September 1909, when Eugène Lefebvre, testing a Wright biplane, climbed to an altitude of 10 metres (33 ft) before suddenly pitching forward and crashing. Thrown from the plane, he died in the infirmary shortly afterward without ever regaining consciousness, becoming the first pilot in history to die while at the controls of a powered aircraft; whether the crash resulted from human error or a mechanical failure was never determined. Flying continued on the field as the month continued, highlighted by tests on 16 September of a biplane with an Antoinette 24-horsepower (18-kilowatt) engine, followed that evening by a flight by Charles de Lambert of two laps of the race course, covering 7 kilometres (4.3 mi) at a height of 12 metres (39 ft) before landing in front of his hangar. Another crash occurred on 20 September 1909, when a Blériot monoplane struck the stands' balustrade.

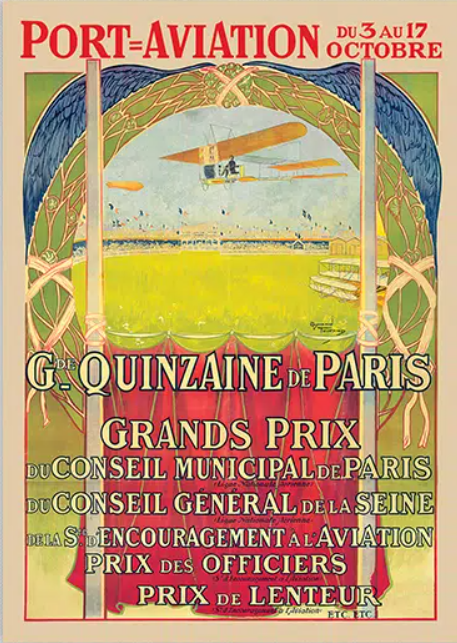
A poster advertising the Grande Quinzaine de Paris at Port-Aviation. It gives the dates 3–17 October 1909 for the event, which actually lasted until 21 October.

Of the many aviation events held at Port-Aviation, the most notable was the Grande Quinzaine de Paris ("Great Fortnight of Paris") of October 1909, for which the grandstands were expanded and decorated. Organizers originally scheduled the event for 7 to 21 October, but the large number of entrants prompted them to expand the schedule, with testing and training days from 3 to 6 October followed by official events from 7 to 21 October. The Grande Quinzaine drew huge crowds, including a record number of spectators on 10 October, estimated by the weekly newspaper L'Illustration at 100,000 and by the magazine L'Aérophile at 250,000 to 300,000; with the surprised railway lines overwhelmed, visitors were packed into trains and cattle cars and many did not reach Port-Aviation at all.

A number of aviation exploits occurred during the Grande Quinzaine, and the Prince of Monaco, Albert I, attended on several days. On 14 October, with French President Armand Fallières, his wife, many French government ministers, and Albert I looking on, Louis Paulhan in a Voisin biplane reached an altitude of 16 metres (52 ft) despite very gusty winds, flew outside the perimeter of the airfield for a cross-country excursion, and returned to make a perfect gliding landing, to cheers and applause from the crowd. Jean Gobron braved the wind to complete six laps of the field in 11 minutes 42.5 seconds, and in calmer weather later in the day, Paulham again took to the air and completed 11 laps.

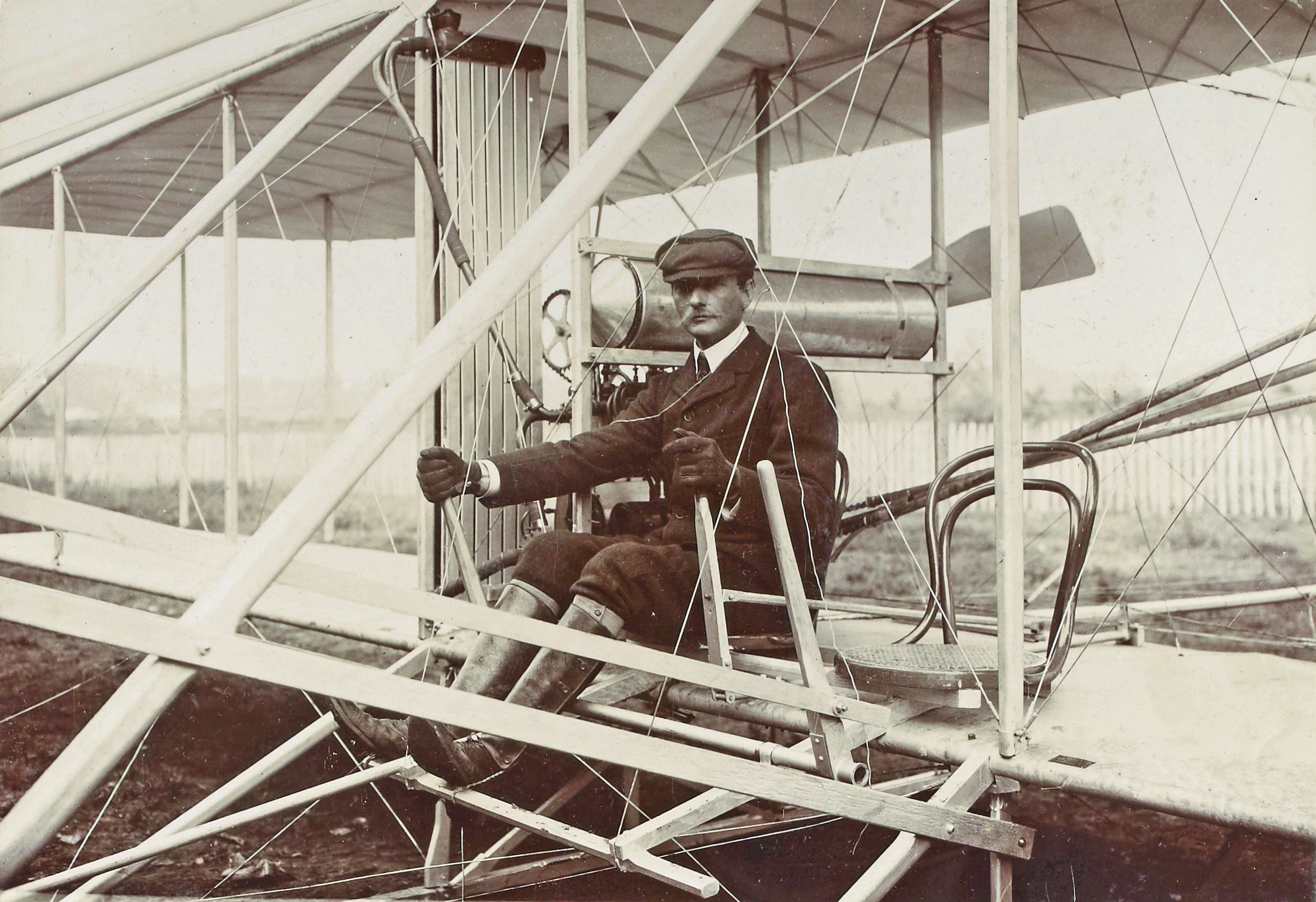
Charles de Lambert in his Wright Model A in October 1909.

The most impressive flight during the Grande Quinzaine was one on 18 October by Charles de Lambert who, flying the Wright Model A No. 20, took off from Port-Aviation in the presence of Fallières and flew around the Eiffel Tower in Paris — to the great excitement of the city's population — before following the Seine to find his way back to Port-Aviation and returning to land at his starting point after a 48-kilometre (30 mi) flight of either 48 minutes 39 seconds or 49 minutes 39.25 seconds, according to different sources. It was considered the first completion of an aerial navigation route, and it was the first time a pilot had flown over a city, with no possibility of landing safely in an emergency. He also set a new altitude record during the flight. A tragic first occurred at Port-Aviation the same day, however, when a Blériot monoplane flown by Alfred Leblanc plunged into a crowd of spectators, injuring more than a dozen people and killing a woman who became the first person in history to be killed on the ground by a falling airplane. The tragedy prompted the Paris lawyer Paul Foy to conduct the first prosecution for "furious driving in the air" in October 1909.

On 21 October 1909, the closing day of the Grande Quinzaine, Henri Brégi completed the longest flight of the event other than de Lambert's Eiffel Tower flight, covering 13 laps in 33 minutes 3.4 seconds, while de Lambert completed six laps in 12 minutes 9.3 seconds, reaching a height of 40 metres (131 ft).

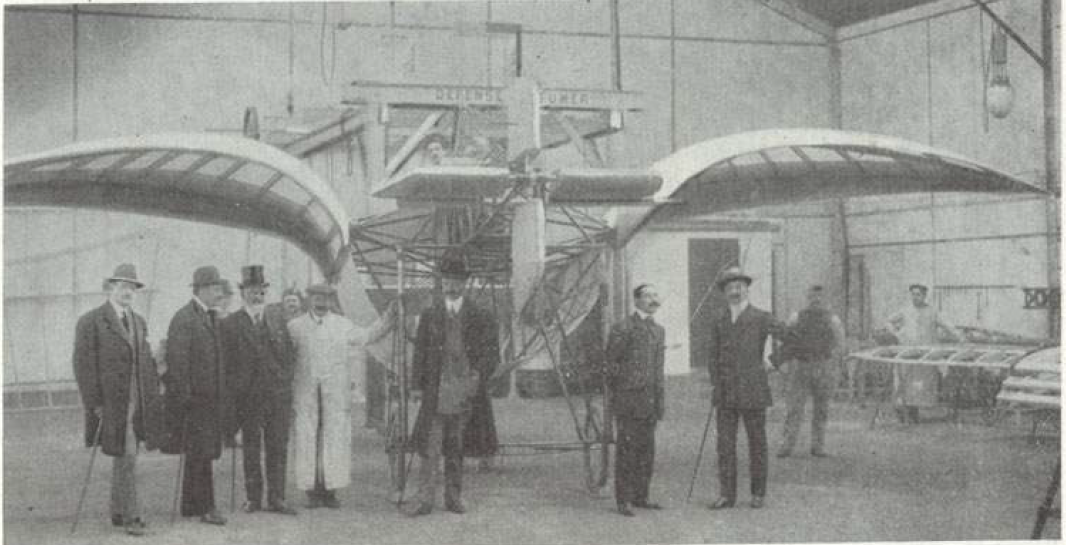
Rodrig Goliescu′s Avioplan in a hangar at Port-Aviation in 1909 after an inspection by the Aéro-Club de France.

When the 1909 air show season ended, Port-Aviation closed to the public for the winter, although flights continued from the airfield. In November 1909, Rodrig Goliescu tested his Avioplan No. II — the first aircraft with a tubular fuselage and the first with a tubed propeller to fly — at Port-Aviation, reaching an altitude of about 50 metres (164 ft). In an attempt to win the 1909 International Michelin Cup, presented for the longest nonstop fight distance of 1909, Léon Delagrange established a new distance record for monoplanes and a new world speed record on 30 December 1909 in a flight at Port-Aviation, covering 200 kilometres (124 mi) in 2 hours 32 minutes at an average speed of approximately 79 kilometres per hour (49 mph). However, he did not succeed in beating Henri Farman's record for distance for the year.

=== 1910 ===
By the beginning of 1910, the Compagnie de l'Aviation was facing financial difficulties. In the winter and spring of 1910, the Orge flooded the airfield, its waters rising in mid-January and forcing the suspension of flights beginning on 21 January. Water covered most of the airfield and forced the evacuation of its hangars. Flights did not resume until 2 March 1910, when the field still was partially waterlogged. On 3 April 1910, Émile Dubonnet took off from Port-Aviation in a Tellier monoplane and made a flight to La Ferté-Saint-Aubin which won him a 10,000-franc prize offered by the magazine La Nature for "the first cross-country flight, far from airfields and under conditions realistic to practical aviation, of at least 100 kilometres [62.1 miles] in less than two hours, between two points specified in advance."

The loss of revenue during the closure of Port-Aviation and the expense of making repairs after the flooding prompted the Compagnie de l'Aviation to declare bankruptcy in April 1910. New owners took control of Port-Aviation, and they immediately demolished the airfield's western grandstands to make room for additional administrative buildings and expand the hangar area farther to the northwest. During 1910, a number of new hangars were constructed at Port-Aviation and ten flying schools opened at the airfield. It became an internationally important aviation center, where many pilots from a variety of countries came to pass tests for their pilot's licenses, as well as a popular place to visit for Parisians. Festive crowds returned for events, and the bars and kiosks along the Avenue Blériot reopened. The Compagnie d'Orléans took steps to improve rail service and eliminate the long waits for trains that had occurred in 1909. A new press pavilion opened, as did post and telegraph offices, several telephone booths were available, and the airfield had direct telegraph lines to London and Berlin. Famous aviators including Roland Garros and Elise Leontine Deroche, also known as Raymonde de Laroche, performed at the venue.

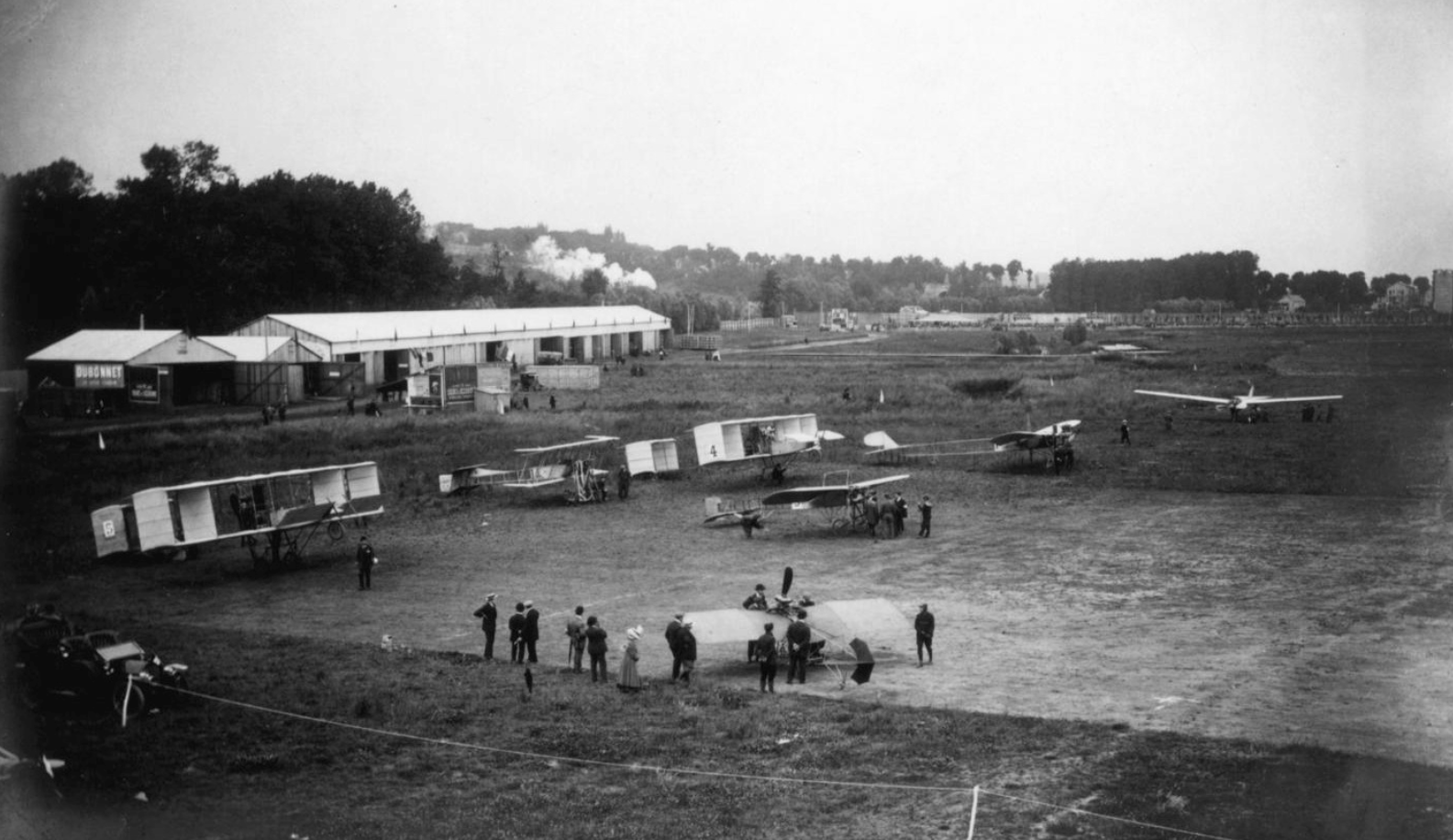
Seven of the eight competing airplanes at the Grande Semaine de Paris. Émile Dubonnet's Tellier monoplane is second from right.

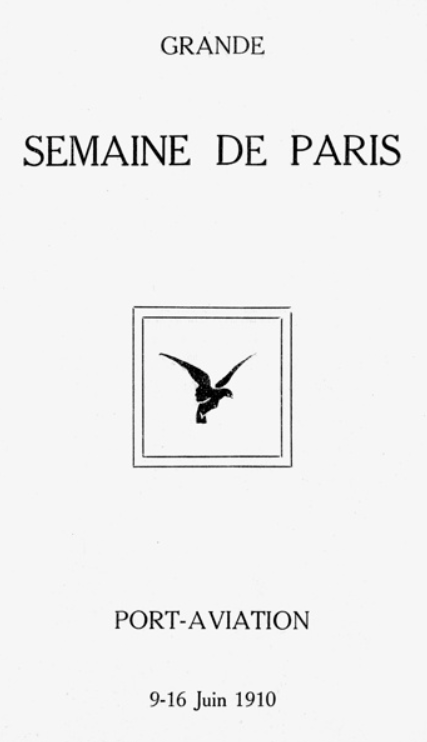
The title page of the official program of the Grande Semaine de Paris.

From 9 to 16 June 1910, the Aéro-Club de France (Aero Club of France) sponsored a French national aviation meet, the Grande Semaine de Paris (Great Paris Week), at Port-Aviation. Its prize fund was modest, it was held at the same time as a prestigious aviation meet at Budapest, and it ended less than a week before a much larger French meet at Rouen, and as a result it did not attract any of aviation's biggest names. It had 14 entrants, of whom only eight flew officially, with Émile Dubonnet as its most famous competitor. The meet included contests for total distance, non-stop distance, altitude, quickest take-off, fastest speed with a passenger on board, and fastest speed for a flight that included a mandatory one-minute stop with engine running. In addition, a nearby landowner, Léon Laurent, promised a plot of land worth 5,000 francs to the first aviator who made a flight from Port-Aviation to his property — located 3 kilometres (1.9 mi) from the airfield — and back, but apparently no one claimed the prize. The meet drew an estimated 30,000 spectators on its first day, another large crowd on its second, and on its fourth day a crowd of 50,000 looked on in addition to people watching from the nearby hills. Stormy weather interfered with flying on several days, but the Grande Semaine was reasonably successful, and Dubonnet stood out as the most impressive competitor. To make up for the lack of action on some of the days of the Grand Semaine, its organizers invited spectators back for an additional day of flying at Port-Aviation on 19 June 1910.

On 11 July 1910, Florentin Champel, who had competed in the Grande Semaine in a Voisin biplane, took off from Port-Aviation in his Voisin to attempt a cross-country flight across Paris. He arrived safely at Sartrouville after a 55-minute, 60-kilometre (37 mi) flight.

=== 1911–1914 ===
Port-Aviation's designers had not anticipated the rapid advances in airplane technologies and capabilities of the era and, while adequate for the airplanes of 1908, the airfield began to decline in importance in 1911 as the faster and heavier aircraft coming into use outgrew it. Moreover, after January 1911 opportunities arose for foreign pilots to qualify for their pilot's licenses in their own countries, reducing Port-Aviation's importance as an international pilot qualification center.

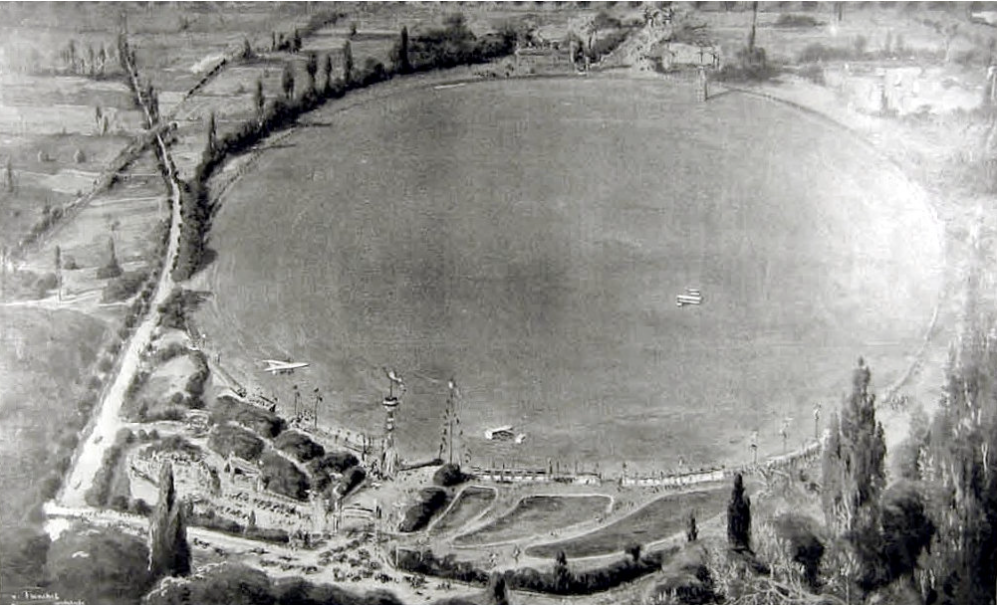
Port-Aviation looking northeast, ca. 1913.

Weekend aviation events nonetheless continued to draw crowds. On 19 May 1911, Port-Aviation hosted the start of the Paris-to-Rome aircraft race and its winner, the aviator André Beaumont, received the blessing of Pope Pius X after arriving in Rome. In October 1911, Port-Aviation hosted a charitable aviation event for the aviator Freya, and a major kite competition, the Gordon Kite Cup, took place at the airfield that month as well.

In its 6 February 1912 edition, the newspaper La Croix noted that aviator Camille Guillaume planned a parachuting experiment on either 18 or 25 February 1912 in which he would pilot a Blériot monoplane to a height of 300 metres (980 ft) over Port-Aviation and jump from it using a parachute he had invented, allowing the airplane to crash after he jumped. A post card indicates that he made the jump successfully.

In early 1912, Port-Aviation played a role in the development of the first flying boat when François Denhaut tested a seaplane which floated on a boat-hull-shaped fuselage — rather than on a system of floats, as had been used in previous seaplane designs — and tested it in the Grand Etang (Great Pond). He flew it over the Seine on 12 March 1912 in a test that ended when the plane flipped over as he attempted to land on the water. Denhaut subsequently rebuilt the plane to a modified design and resumed tests on the Grand Etang. On 13 April 1912, he took off from Port-Aviation in the modified plane and landed on muddy ground close to the Seine. The aircraft then was pushed into the river and it took off and alighted seven or eight times before Denhaut returned to the bank of the Seine. The world's first flying boat, Denhaut's plane influenced the design of many later flying boats.

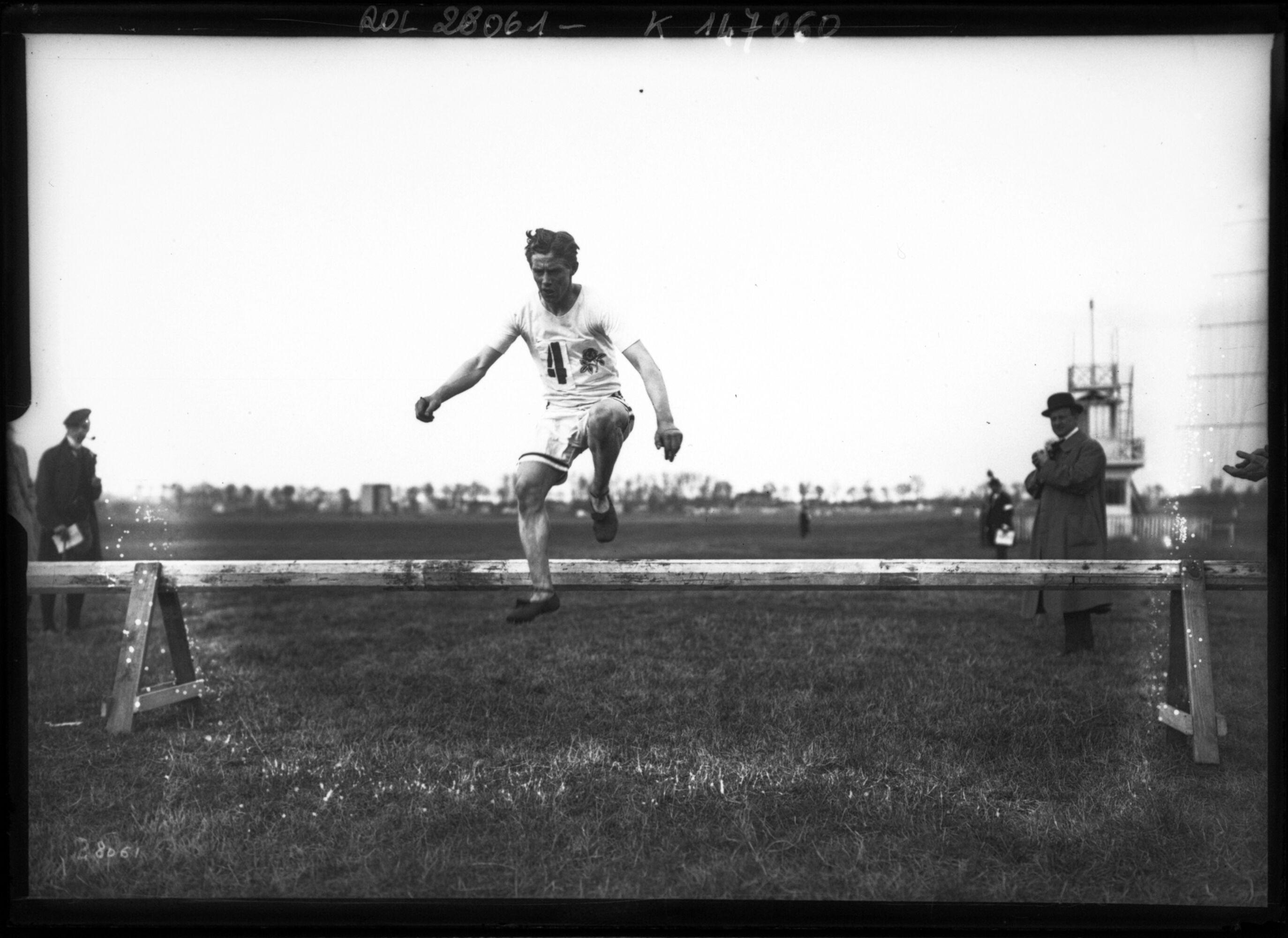
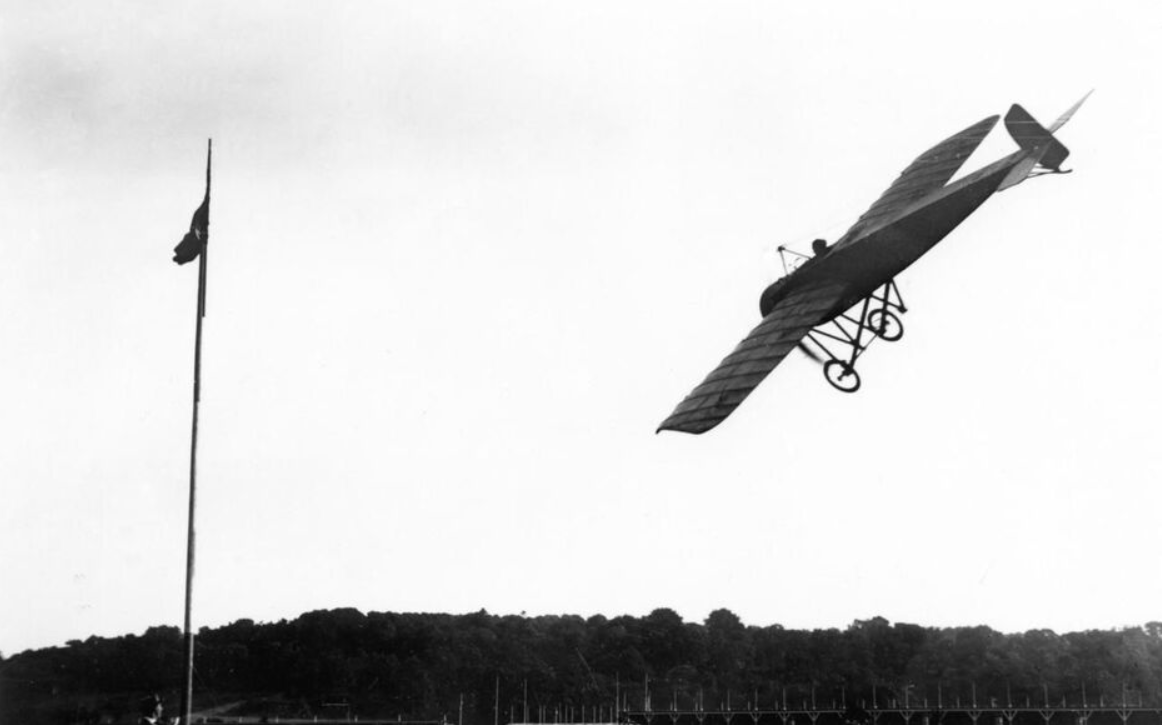
LEFT: 1912 Olympian Ernest Glover competes in the 1913 International Cross Country Championships at Port-Aviation on 24 March 1913. RIGHT: Roland Garros makes a turn around a pylon during a 1913 race at Port-Aviation.

Port-Aviation also hosted horse races, bicycle races, and cross country running races. The Cycle-Pedestrian Cross took place at Port-Aviation on 13 February 1913, and on 24 March 1913 Jean Bouin won the 1913 International Cross Country Championships (or "Five Nations Cross") there.

During the summer of 1913, Roland Garros, Edmond Audemars, and Marcel Brindejonc des Moulinais competed in aviation time trials at the airfield. The new sport of aerobatics also led to new achievements at Port-Aviation, where Adolphe Pegoud entertained the crowds in a Blériot XI with the world's first inverted flight on 1 September 1913 and with a loop on 21 September 1913 — acclaimed at the time as the world's first loop, although later found to have been the second, occurring 12 days after Pyotr Nesterov performed the first loop at Syretzk Aerodrome near Kiev in the Russian Empire. Maurice Chevillard set a record for consecutive loops on 6 November 1913 when he looped a Farman biplane powered by an 80-horsepower (60-kilowatt) Gnome et Rhône radial engine five times in succession at Port-Aviation. He performed this feat at an altitude of 46 metres (150 ft).

Parachuting events also took place over the airfield. On 12 February 1914, Jean Ors dropped safely over Port-Aviation from beneath a Deperdussin aircraft piloted at an altitude of 500 metres (1,640 ft) by Louis Lemoine. On 21 February 1914 Jean Bourhis parachuted safely from the passenger seat of an airplane flying over Port-Aviation.

Despite these events and several bankruptcy declarations and reorganizations that attempted to reverse its fortunes, Port-Aviation went into financial decline. The airfield's financial woes and repeated bankruptcies also prevented Viry-Châtillon from collecting most of the taxes Port-Aviation owed it over the years. A Juvisy-sur-Orge entrenpreneur with the surname Piketty purchased the land in November 1913 with the intention of subdividing and selling it. By the summer of 1914 the aviation facilities had fallen into disuse and the airfield was used only for grazing cattle.

=== World War I ===
France entered World War I on 3 August 1914, and the outbreak of the war brought new life to Port-Aviation. Forty French soldiers quickly were stationed at Port-Aviation to guard the railroad tracks leading to Juvisy station, and in the spring of 1915 the British Royal Flying Corps based 12 airplanes at the airfield. In the autumn of 1915 French Army aviation units replaced the British and established a training center at Port-Aviation, operating Caudron airplanes. Some 600 military pilots trained at Port-Aviation between 1915 and 1917. The French Army also housed colonial troops from French Indochina and their families at Port-Aviation.

As the war wore on, the French Army deemed the airfield to be in a poor location, subject to frequent flooding by the Orge and lying in a narrow plain bordered by hills that too closely hemmed in the more powerful military aircraft that came into use as the war progressed. The United States entered the war in April 1917, and later that year the Americans established a new airfield on a plateau 10 kilometres (6.2 mi) north of Port-Aviation near Orly, the forerunner of Paris Orly Airport. As a result, Port-Aviation became obsolete. The French Army moved its aviation training activities to Etampes on 1 January 1918. According to one source, the airfield was closed and abandoned that day, but others claim that Belgian military forces moved in after the French left. Sometime in 1918, the airfield was closed and abandoned.

== Legacy ==
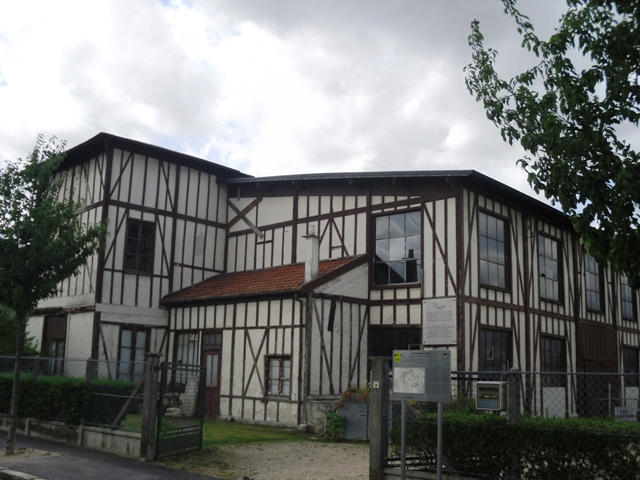
The last surviving building from the airfield, seen on 2 September 2009, served as a hotel and restaurant, and was the officers', and later the noncommissioned officers', mess during World War I.

In 1918, after failing in an attempt to find sand to quarry on the site of the abandoned airfield, the Piketty Company divided up the land and in the summer of 1919 began to sell it in units of around 350 square metres (3,800 sq ft). Plots in the southern half of the airfield were sold for housing construction between 1919 and 1927, and the construction of houses began at the southern end of the former airfield and spread northward. Between 1927 and 1933, plots in the northern half of the airfield were sold, and housing construction was completed in 1933. The construction of houses resulted in the demolition of almost all of the former airfield's structures. The new owners continued to suffer from frequent floods until 1932, when the Orge was canalized and a pumping station was installed to control flooding. By the 21st century, a very large, heterogenous residential area with a population of about 5,000 people — known, like the airfield it replaced, as Port-Aviation — covered the land where the airfield once stood, although the Grand Etang (Great Pond) survives.

The airfield's only surviving building is a wood-and-plasterboard structure Tronchet designed. It served as a reception site, viewing venue, and hotel for prestigious guests at Port-Aviation during its early years and later was the airfield's officers' mess, and after that the noncommissioned officers' mess, during World War I. After the airfield closed, the building continued to operate as a hotel and restaurant until 1927, then had many different uses over the decades until 1993, when it was last vacated.

== Commemoration ==
To commemorate Port-Aviation, the commune of Viry-Châtillon adopted a coat of arms in 1974 that notably features an airplane propeller. In 1995 it adopted a municipal logo with the Blériot XI, Louis Blériot's airplane, as its main motif. Most streets in the area bear the names of aviation pioneers.

In 2009, Viry-Châtillon celebrated the centennial of Port-Aviation. The celebration, held in partnership with Aéroports de Paris and with the support of the department of Essonne, was included in the French Ministry of Culture and Communication's list of 2009 national events and was a popular success. It included the publication of various books, newsletters, magazine articles, and online information pages relating the history of aviation and the Port-Aviation district; the creation of bibliographies; school activities, including a live discussion by school students with the commander of the Space Shuttle in orbit around the earth; an oral history by a surviving witness to the early events at Port-Aviation airfield; educational workshops; film screenings; radio programs; a festival; and an overflight of the former airfield site by vintage aircraft.

As part of the centennial, a heritage trail was opened in 2009 in what is now the Port-Aviation residential district. It is a pedestrian circuit that marks the area of the former site of the Port-Aviation airfield with signs indicating the locations of its main entrance, two other entrances, its installations, its grassy race courses, its signal mast, and the Grand Etang (Great Pond), as well as the hangars used while the site hosted military flight schools during World War I.

Viry-Châtillon purchased the former hotel-restaurant and mess hall in 1983. Since it was last vacated in 1993, consideration has been given to restoring it. It had fallen into disrepair by March 2019, when the Île-de-France Region awarded it the "Heritage of Regional Interest" label, which created the possibility of securing funding for its restoration.
