= Émile Dubonnet =

French balloonist

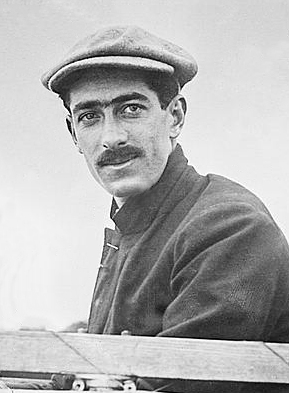
- Born: 18 October 1883; Paris, France
- Died: 4 October 1950 (aged 66); Montrieux-en-Sologne, France
- Occupation: Balloonist

Émile Dubonnet (18 October 1883 - 4 October 1950) was a French balloonist active from 1908 to 1913. He participated in the 1908, 1909, and 1911 Gordon Bennett Cup in ballooning and was a member of the Aéro-Club de France. He won the La Grande Medaille de Aéro-Club de France in 1912. He holds a Fédération Aéronautique Internationale record from 1912-1913.

== Biography ==
Dubonnet was born on 18 October 1883 in Paris to a winemaker. In 1910 he flew over Paris in his Tellier brothers aircraft. He started from Port-Aviation ("Juvisy Airfield") at Viry-Châtillon and made a landing at Bois de Boulogne.

Dubonnet also helped form the first professional baseball league in France, the French Baseball Union, in 1912.
