= Fernand Henri Chavannes =

French World War I flying ace

- Born: April 16, 1897; Paris, France
- Died: October 5, 1985 (aged 88)
- Military career
- Allegiance: France
- Branch: Aviation
- Rank: Sous lieutenant
- Unit: Escadrille 176, Escadrille 112
- Awards: Légion d'honneur Médaille militaire Croix de Guerre

Sous Lieutenant Fernand Henri Chavannes (1897-1985) was a French World War I flying ace credited with seven aerial victories.

== Biography ==
Fernand Henri Chavannes was the son of renowned sinologist and Chinese scholar Édouard Chavannes. The younger Chavannes was born on 16 April 1897 in Paris. He began his military service on 12 January 1916; on 29 February, he went for pilot training. On 21 December 1916, he received Military Pilot's Brevet No. 5074. After advanced training, he was posted to Escadrille 112 on 24 April 1917. Chavannes and his friend Lionel de Marmier were chosen to share a new "cannon Spad", the SPAD XII, when it came out in mid-1917. The letters "M" and "C", representing their last names, were intertwined in paint on the side of its fuselage.

Chavannes's string of seven confirmed victories began on 8 February 1918. After his fifth victory, he was commissioned as a temporary Sous lieutenant on 1 April 1918. He ended the war with seven victories.

== Honors and awards ==
- Légion d'Honneur

"Pursuit pilot of exceptional audacity and skill. Entitled to eight citations and seven victories." Légion d'Honneur citation

- Médaille Militaire

"First class pursuit pilot, courageous and with accomplished skill. He reported his fourth victory by attacking an enemy two-seater and forcing it to land behind our lines." Médaille Militaire citation, 13 April 1918

- Chavannes also won the Croix de Guerre with seven palmes and an etoile de bronze.
