= François Denhaut =

- Born: 21 December 1881; Champagnat, Creuse
- Died: 1952, Bellegarde-en-Marche, Creuse
- Occupations: Aviator, aircraft designer.
- Known for: First practical flying boat

François Denhaut (1877–1952) was a French aviator notable for designing, constructing and flying the first flying boat in 1912.

== Life ==
He was born on 4 October 1877 at Champagnat, Creuse and after some success as a racing cyclist became interested in aviation. In 1908 he constructed his first aircraft, a canard biplane powered by a 15 hp (11 kW) Anzani. engine constructed with the help of a mechanic called Bouyer a M. Mercier. It was briefly flown in August 1909, with Bouyer at the controls, In 1911 he gained his pilot's license and became the chief pilot of Pierre Levasseur's flying school.

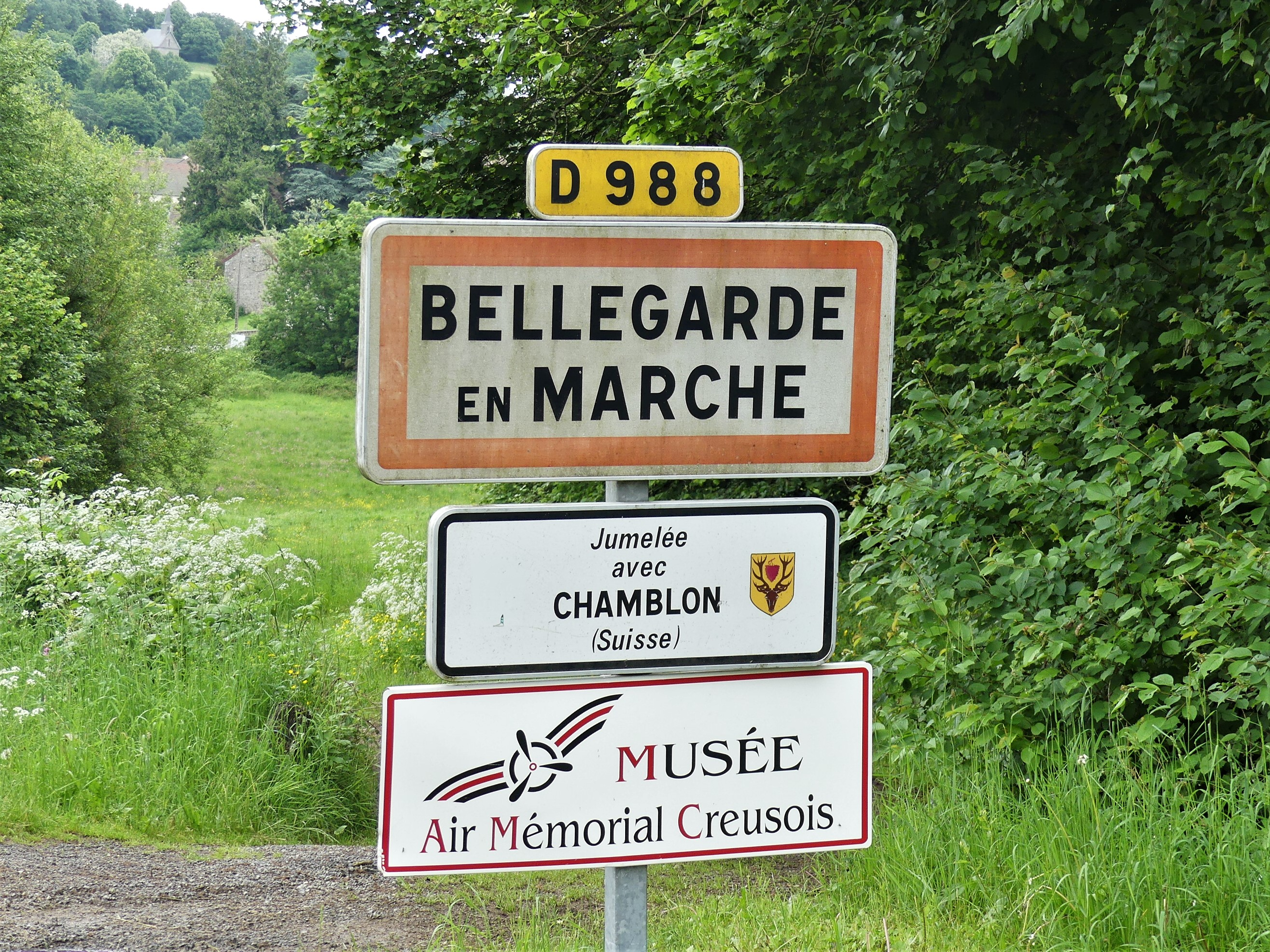
Bellegarde-en-Marche entry panels, with notification of the Air Memorial presenting Denhaut's life and achievements

He died at Bellegarde-en-Marche in 1952. An Air Memorial is dedicated to him in Bellegarde, at the Maison Chevanne, a 17th-century house that is also the village's tourism office and library.

== Aircraft ==
=== 1911 Model ===
In 1911 Denhault conceived the idea of the flying boat, an aircraft whose fuselage formed the main float of the aircraft. Previous aircraft intended to fly from water had all used an arrangement of floats mounted below the aircraft in place of wheels. The hull was triangular in cross section, with the apex at the top. To provide hydrodynamic lift, the hull was fitted with an angled plate mounted below the nose. It was powered by a 50 hp (37 kW) Gnome Omega driving a pusher propeller mounted below the upper wing. To allow for maneuvering on the ground, an undercarriage was fitted, with two wheels attached. Denhaut took particular advantage of this aspect of the design by taking off from the ground when he made the initial tests. This project was financed by Jacques Donnet, and the craft was later named after him.

The first proper test of the craft took place on 12 March 1912. Denhaut took off and flew over the River Seine. However, when preparing to land, misjudged his approach, the nose-mounted hydroplane dug in, and the aircraft turned over; Denhaut managed to escape from the submerged cockpit, and took refuge on the bottom of the upturned hull. The craft was towed back to shore.

=== 1912 modifications ===
Denhaut, with the advice of Robert Duhamel, decided to rebuild the aircraft, making the necessary modifications to the first design model. He changed the hull to be rectangular in shape, because it had previously been very slender, and had tended to dip into the water. He also made slight modifications to the position of the undercarriage.

He tested the modified design on the Grand Etang (Great Pond), a stretch of water in the eastern corner of Port-Aviation (often called "Juvisy Airfield") at Viry-Châtillon, where he had first tested the older model. After this test, the wheels were replaced temporarily with water floats.

On 13 April 1912, slightly over a month since the initial test of the first design, Denhaut's craft flew from Port-Aviation and landed on muddy ground close to the Seine. The aircraft was pushed into the water where it took off and alighted seven or eight times. Denhaut then returned to the bank of the Seine. Denhaut's second model had succeeded in becoming the world's first flying boat. Many later designs for flying boats can be seen to be very clearly based upon Denhaut's design.

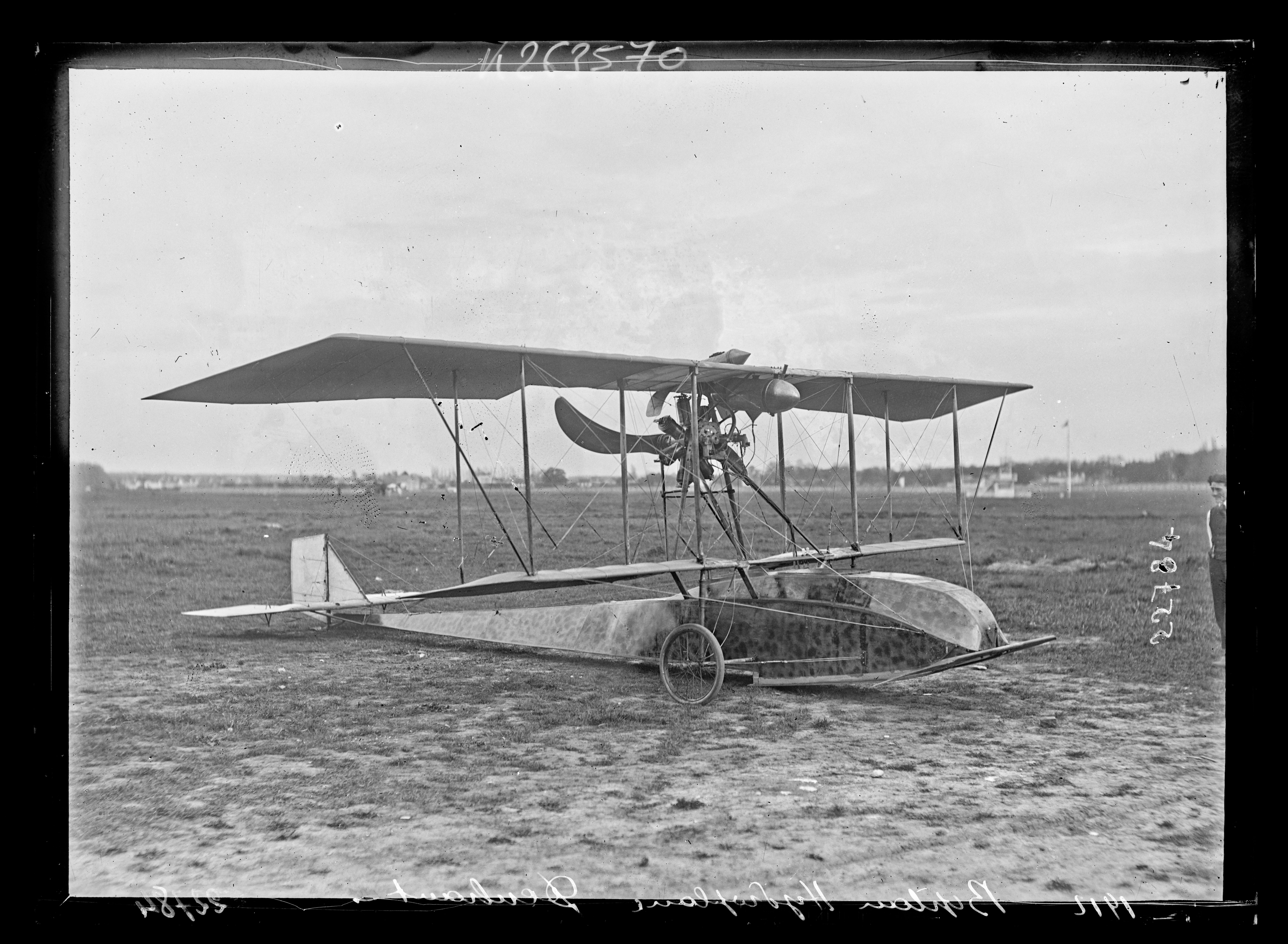
Denhaut's flying boat.

Specifications
Wingspan	10.86 m
Length	8.40 m
Wing area	21.80 m^{3}
Empty weight	436 kg
Total weight	650 kg
Max. speed	97 km/h
capacity	1 pilot, 1 passenger
