= Lionel de Marmier =

Lionel Alexandre Pierre de Marmier
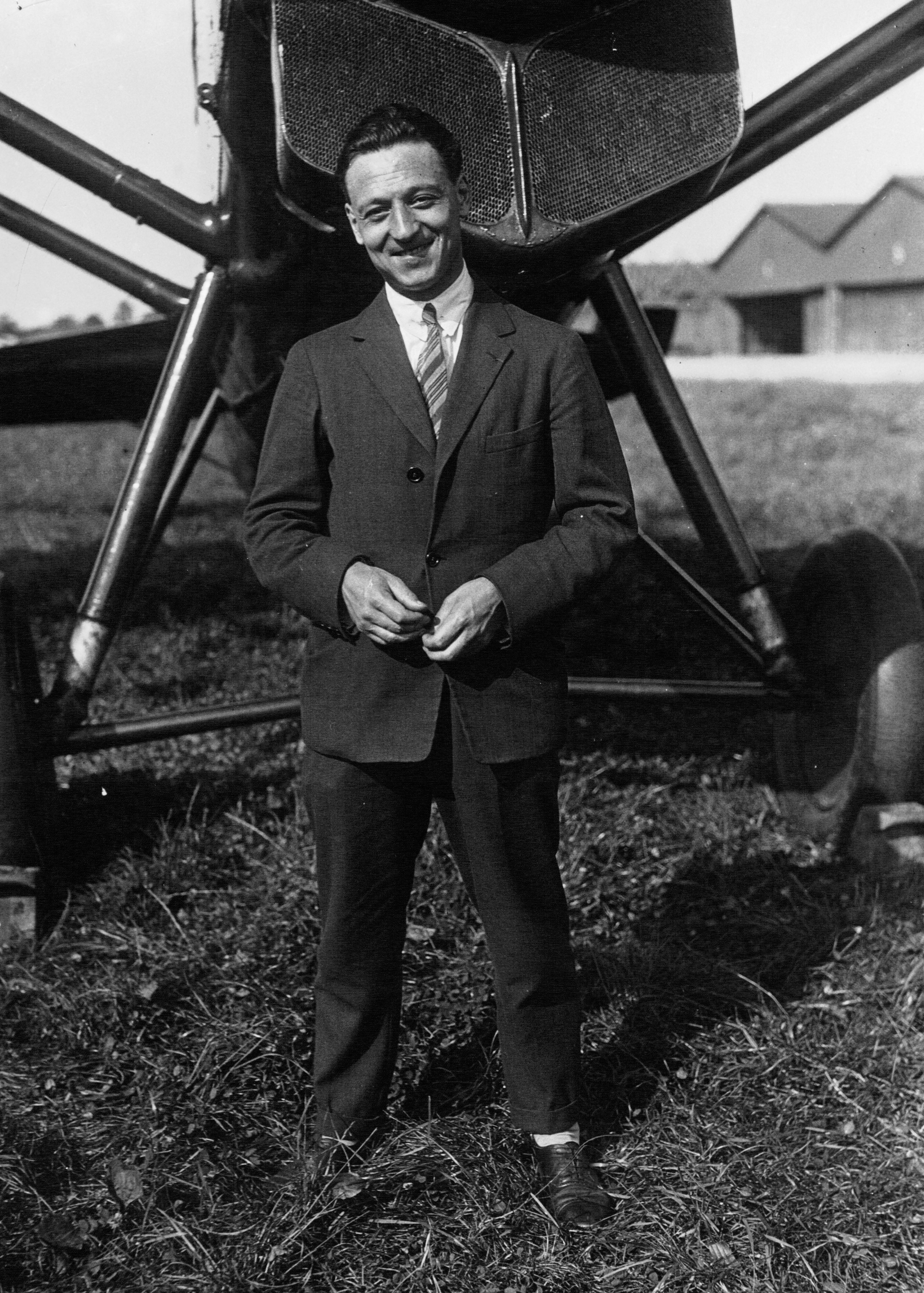
- Lionel de Marmier in 1927.
- Born: 4 December 1897; Bellegarde-en-Marche, France
- Died: 30 December 1944 (aged 47)
- Military career
- Allegiance: France
- Branch: Aviation
- Service years: 1916–1944
- Rank: General
- Unit: Escadrille 176, Escadrille 112
- Awards: Légion d'honneur Médaille militaire Croix de Guerre
- Other work: Spanish Civil War; World War II

Lionel Alexandre Pierre de Marmier was a World War I flying ace credited with six confirmed aerial victories in World War I. He remained involved in aviation postwar, setting flying records and serving in the Spanish Civil War. At the start of World War II, he returned to his nation's service, shooting down at least one German plane. He died in an air crash on 30 December 1944. He was posthumously promoted to General.

== Biography ==
Lionel Alexandre Pierre de Marmier was born in Bellegarde-en-Marche, France on 4 December 1897.

== World War I service ==
He began military service on 12 January 1916, with an aviation unit. On 15 March 1916, he went for pilot training. He graduated initial training with his Military Pilot's Brevet on 2 July 1916. After advanced training, he was posted to Escadrille 112 on 1 December 1916. He rose through the enlisted ranks while serving with them, reaching the rank of Adjutant on 5 December 1917.

He made unconfirmed combat claims for a pair of single-handed victories on 30 September 1917. Then he began to hunt in consort with Fernand Henri Chavannes. When the new SPAD XII came out in Spring 1918, it was distributed one per French squadron. The "cannon Spad" for their unit was shared between Marmier and his friend Chavannes; it even bore the shared marking of an 'M' entwined with a 'C'.

At any rate, the two of them would claim four victories together, with another one going unconfirmed. De Marmier's sixth and final World War I victory came on 31 May 1918. That same day, he was promoted out of the enlisted ranks, being commissioned as a Sous lieutenant. For his valor, he had earned the Médaille Militaire and the Croix de Guerre by war's end.

== Between the wars ==
On 15 February 1920, he was honored by induction as a Chevalier into the Legion d'honneur. On 15 February 1930, he was raised to the level of Officier in the Legion. Meanwhile, he set several world aviation records, leading to his further promotion in the Legion, to Commandeur. He also fought in the Spanish Civil War.

In the 1920s he undertook a brief career in motor racing, driving a Salmson twice at the Le Mans 24 Hours and a handful of "single seater" races.

== World War II service ==
In September 1939, de Marmier returned to duty with his nation with the rank of Commandant. Marmier claimed at least one German plane on 3 June 1940, while he was flying a Caudron C.714 with the Polish pilots of GC 1/145 'Varsovie'. After the French surrender, he joined the Free French Air Force. In September 1941 he was ordered by General Charles de Gaulle to set up and take command of a new Free French air transport service, intended to link Free French colonies. He was given the rank of Général de brigade (Brigadier general) on 25 September 1944. On 30 December 1944, de Marmier was in command of a Lockheed Model 18 Lodestar which disappeared over the Mediterranean Sea. His body was found by an American patrol boat near Sicily on 4 April 1945.

== Awards and honors ==
Médaille Militaire:
"Elite pilot, every day giving new proof of his exceptional qualities of ardor and bravery. Always volunteers for the most perilous missions and has brilliantly distinguished himself during the combats in which he has engaged, forcing six enemy planes to return disabled to their lines, and by downing three others, two during the course of the same day." Médaille Militaire citation, 9 April 1918

Chevalier de la Légion d'Honneur:
"Pursuit pilot of brilliant bravery who, because of his temerity, never bothered to count the number of his adversaries. He reported seven official victories, and several others not confirmed. He was wounded in one combat and in another his plane burned. One wound, eight citations." Légion d'Honneur citation, 16 June 1920

He was raised to the rank of Officier in the Legion on 15 February 1930, and to Commandeur in January 1936.

He also won the Croix de guerre during World War I.

== Bibliography ==
- Franks, Norman; Bailey, Frank (1993). Over the Front: The Complete Record of the Fighter Aces and Units of the United States and French Air Services, 1914–1918. London: Grub Street Publishing.
- Gutmann, Jon (2002). SPAD XII/XIII aces of World War I. Oxford: Osprey Publishing.
- Méchin, David (December 2022). "Lionel de Marmier: Un destin exceptionnel". Le Fana de l'Aviation (in French). No. 637. pp. 30–39.
- Biography (French)
