= Maurice Chevillard =

French aviator

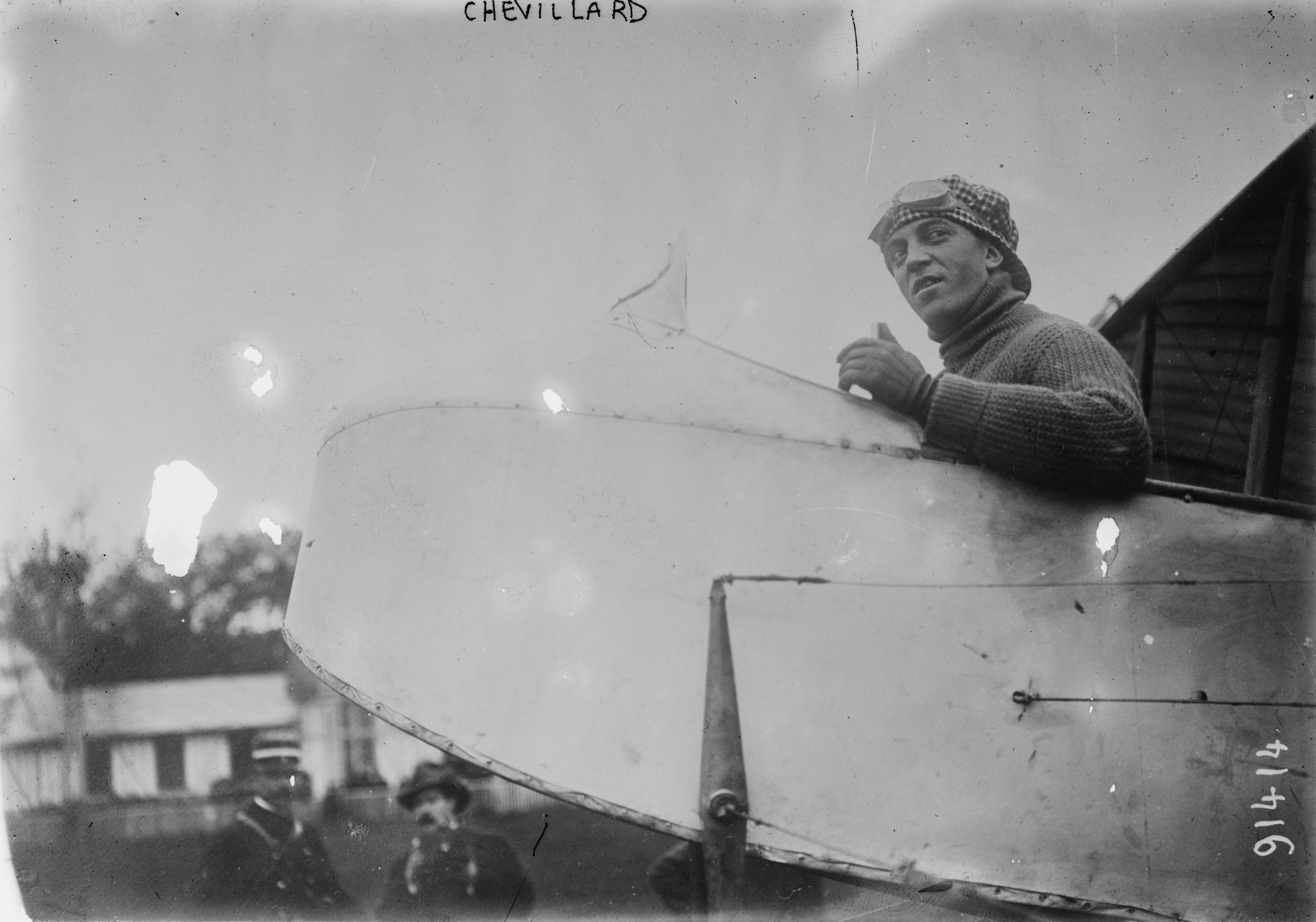
Chevillard in 1914

Maurice R. Chevillard (25 August 1887 - June 1943) was a pioneering French aviator who set a record on 6 November 1913 when he looped a biplane five times in succession at Port-Aviation (often called "Juvisy Airfield") in Viry-Châtillon, France. He was in a Henri Farman biplane powered by an 80-horsepower (60-kilowatt) Gnome et Rhône radial engine.
