= Rodrig Goliescu =

Romanian aviation inventor (1877–1942)

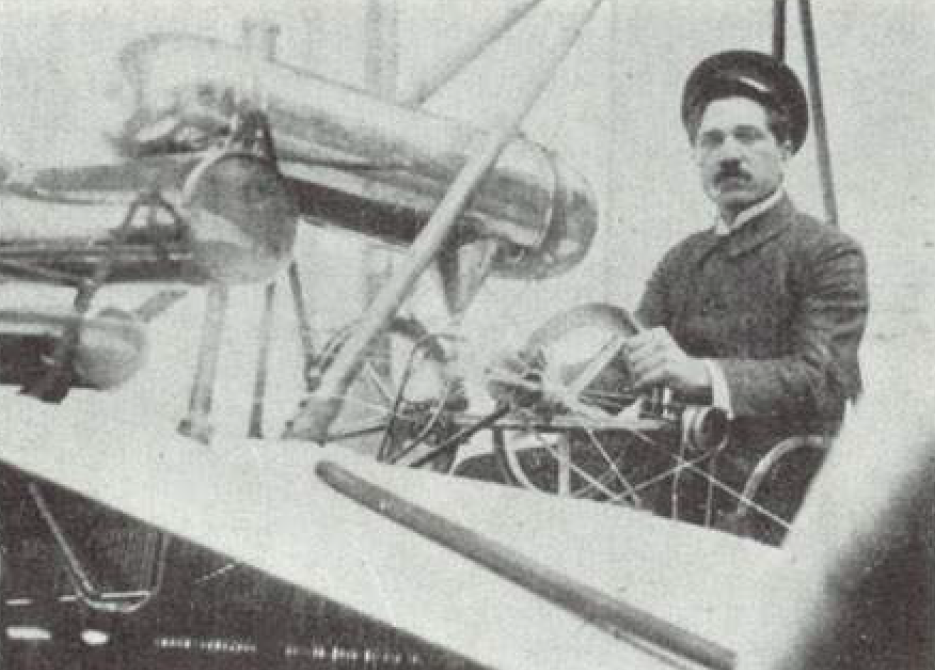
- Rodrig Goliescu on board his Avioplan
- Born: 1877; Dorohoi, Kingdom of Romania
- Died: 1942 (aged 65)
- Occupations: Engineer, inventor, aviator
- Known for: Designing the first airplane with a tubular fuselage.

Rodrig Goliescu (1877 – 1942) was a Romanian inventor, engineer, and lieutenant of Polish descent. He designed and built the "Avioplan," the first airplane with a tubular fuselage.

== Life ==
=== Early life ===
Rodrig Goliescu's father, Sigmund Dobjanschi, was a Polish refugee who moved to Romania in 1863 following the Polish uprising. After moving to Romania, he married Hortensia Gallo and changed his name to Goliescu. Rodrig was born in Dorohoi on 12 May 1877.

After graduating from the A. T. Laurian High School in Botoșani, Rodrig Goliescu followed the artillery and engineer school from Bucharest. In 1900, he finished the school and became a lieutenant, at the same time receiving Romanian citizenship. He served as an active officer and from 1906 he dedicated himself to research in the aeronautical field. Studying the flight of birds, he created various aeromodelling projects.

=== Aviation career ===
In 1909, he worked out several highly original principals regarding the flight of heavier-than-air machines. His ideas were materialized in the flying machine called the Goliescu Avioplan. The most original aspect of the Avioplan was the shape of its fuselage, designed for minimum aerodynamic drag and acting as a tube fan, increasing the efficiency of the propeller. The Avioplan's design was similar to that of modern vertical-take-off-and-landing (VTOL) aircraft and helicopters.

The same year, Goliescu built a model of his Avioplan with a length of 1.2 metres (3.9 ft) and an engine powered by a rubber turnbuckle that was as long as the fuselage, achieving a takeoff angle of 30 degrees with it. Assisted by the Romanian Minister of Education, Spiru Haret, who also helped Aurel Vlaicu, Goliescu went to France to acquire a new engine for his aircraft. While in Paris, he submitted a survey he had written, "Laws of air dynamics," to the French Academy of Sciences, and the French magazine La France automobile et aérienne (France Automobile and Air) published it in its edition of 15 May 1909. He patented his invention in France (patent no. 402329) which he called a flying machine-avioplan. Unlike his previous model, the machine had above the tubular fuselage, a relatively small wing in the shape of an upturned V, with the foil having a pronounced curve at the leading edge. The three-wheeled landing gear was similar to the tricycle of present-day aircraft. After finishing building his airplane, it was examined by a commission of the Aéro-Club de France. The machine was declared to be satisfactory, but it was not tested in flight.

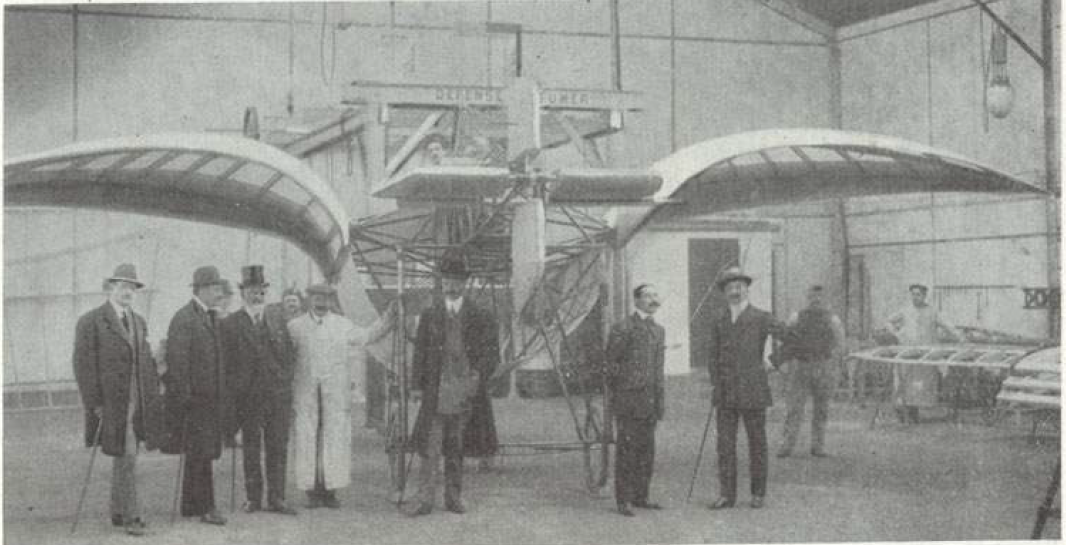
The Goliescu Avioplan in the hangar at Port-Aviation, 1909

Also in 1909, Goliescu learned to fly and built an updated version of the Avioplan, named the Avioplan No.II. The aircraft had a half-cylinder fuselage, but air from the propeller flowed through it as it had in the first model. He flew the Avioplan for the first time in November 1909, at Port-Aviation (often called "Juvisy Airfield") at Viry-Châtillon near Paris, and reached an altitude of about 50 metres (164 ft). It was the first flight by an aircraft with a tubed propeller. He brought the machine to Bucharest with the intention of continuing the experimental flights. The machine was brought to Chitila aerodrome, where a powerful storm destroyed it together with the hangar in which it was placed.

Aircraft designers did not pursue his tubed propeller idea again until 1932, when the Italian engineer Luigi Stipa built the Stipa-Caproni aircraft with a "barrel fuselage". The tubed-propeller design finally reached its full potential after World War II, when aircraft designers successfully implemented it in helicopters, like the Eurocopter AS365 Dauphin and the RAH-66 Comanche, and in the X-35 experimental aircraft which gave rise to the F-35 Lightning II fighter.

With his aircraft destroyed and in dire need of money, Goliescu agreed to become a spy for Russia. He was recruited in June 1912 by Piotr Altinovici, an interpreter at the Russian Legation. Discovered by the Siguranța after he stole top-secret military documents (the country's army's mobilization plans) and made them available to the Russians, he was arrested in February 1913. He was tried and convicted, being imprisoned at the Văcărești Prison for 12 years.

After almost 20 years of absence from the social life scene, Rodrig Goliescu was rehabilitated in 1934. He went on to patent a new type of aircraft with a tubular fuselage, which he called the Aviocoleopter. It had a set of lateral airscrews, defectors and various devices whose purpose was to reproduce the flight of the coleoptera as far as possible. He flight tested this machine until 1936.
