= GHQ =

GHQ may refer to:

- Garhwa railway station, in Jharkhand, India
- General Health Questionnaire
- General headquarters, or, specifically:
  - General Headquarters (Pakistan Army)
  - Supreme Commander for the Allied Powers (General Headquarters in occupied Japan)
  - GHQ India - General Headquarters, India, in British India
  - United States Army Air Corps (previously known as General Headquarters Air Force)
  - General Headquarters (game), a board game designed by Kurt Vonnegut in the 1950s, published in 2024
- FM HD3 channels of WUFT-FM
- GHQ (company), which produces 1:285 scale micro armor for miniature wargaming
