= Rezerva generală a aviației =

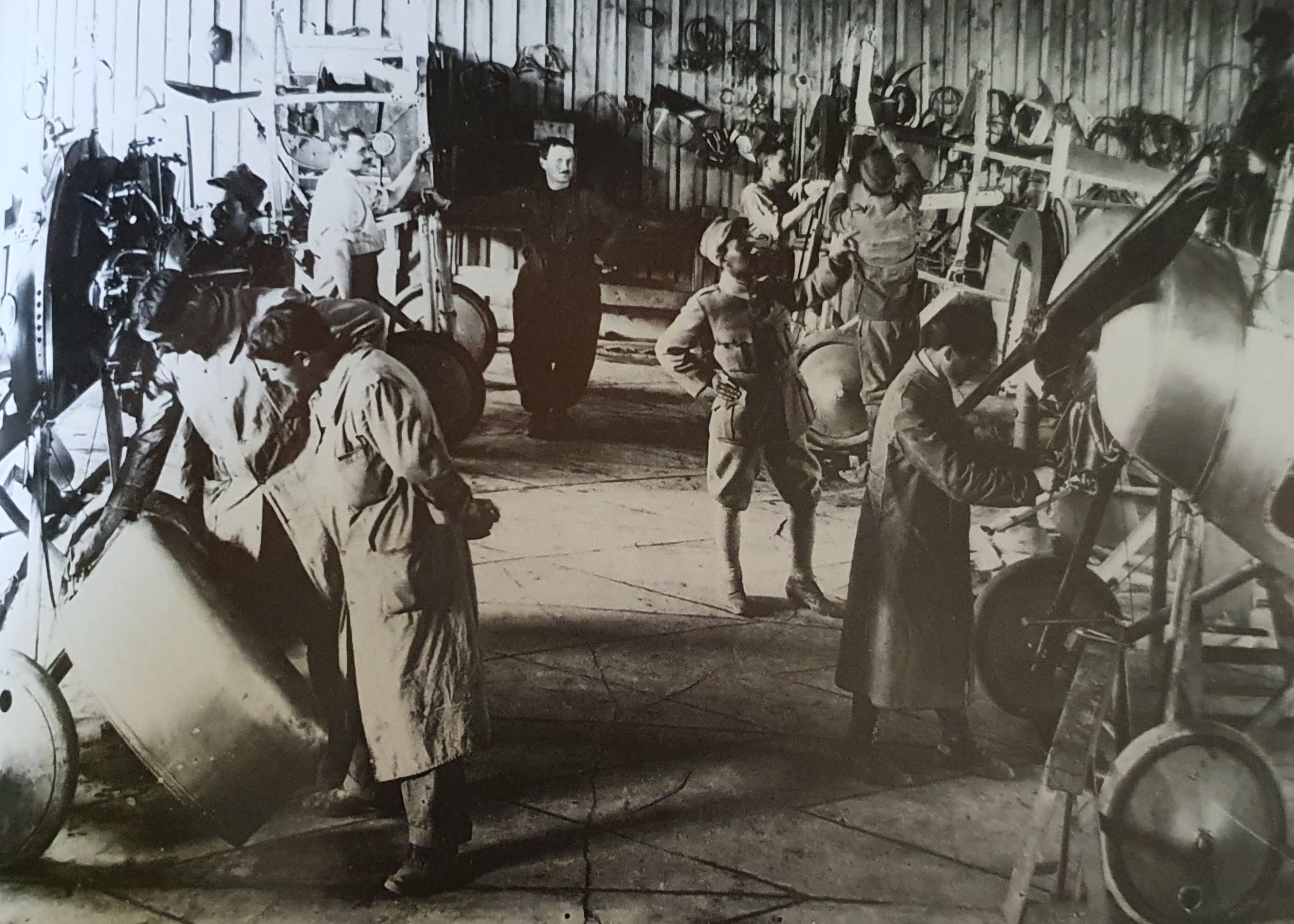
- The assembly of Nieuport fighters at the main workshop of RGA, 1917
- Industry: Aerospace
- Predecessor: Workshops of Cotroceni and Băneasa
- Founded: 1916
- Defunct: 1919
- Fate: Moved to Bucharest, became Arsenalul Aeronautic
- Successor: Arsenalul Aeronautic
- Headquarters: Iași, Romania
- Area served: Romania
- Key people: Constantin Silișteanu; Petre Macavei

Rezerva generală a aviației (RGA) or the General Aviation Reserve in English was a Romanian aircraft factory founded during the First World War. It operated between 1916 and 1919 in Iași. After the war it was transferred to Bucharest and renamed to Arsenalul Aeronautic. The maintenance, repair, and assembly of the aircraft and aircraft engines received by Romania during the war took place here.

== History ==
On 27 September 1916, the workshops of the Flight School from Băneasa and Cotroceni were moved to Iași. The RGA was established in the former slaughterhouse with the material base formed by the materials evacuated from Cotroceni and Băneasa, and with requisitioned tools and machine tools. In the spring of 1917, the organization of the Romanian military aviation also included the RGA, as being subordinated to the Aeronautical Directorate of the Romanian Army's General Headquarters.

During its activity, the RGA assembled and repaired a number of 242 - 292 aircraft and 545 engines. The planes sent by France with General Berthelot's military mission were also assembled in the RGA workshops.

The aircraft received by Romania arrived at the ports of Arkhangelsk and Murmansk, and were then transported by train to Odessa before reaching Romania. Due to the long journey through Russia, a lot of airplanes arrived with severely damaged parts, thus leaving it up to the engineers and designers from RGA to manufacture new ones. Engineer Constantin Silișteanu and Lieutenant Petre Macavei took part in the management of the RGA.

The activity of the RGA ended in November 1919 when the material and the majority of the personnel were transferred to Bucharest on the field of Cotroceni. On 1 July 1920, it was renamed to Arsenalul Aeronautic.

== List of assembled aircraft ==
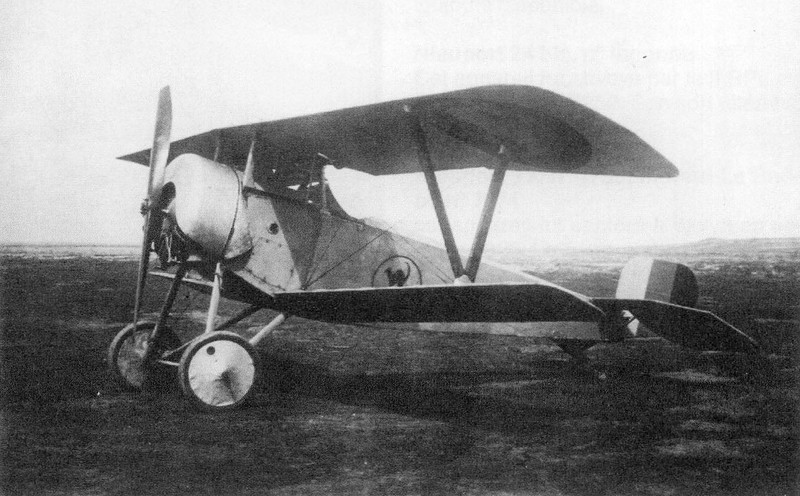
A Romanian Nieuport 11

The workshops of RGA assembled the following airplanes: (Note: The numbers are presented as the total number of aircraft received from 1916 to 1919. It is unclear how many of each type were assembled at RGA.)

Model name	Number	Type
Bréguet-Michelin	12	Bomber
Bréguet 5	20	Bomber & escort fighter
Caudron G.4	20	Reconnaissance bomber
Farman F.40	120	Reconnaissance
Nieuport 11	18+ (Note: 18 Nieuport 11s received from 1 August 1916 to 1 January 1917.)	Fighter
Nieuport 17	30	Fighter
Nieuport 21	10+	Fighter
Nieuport 23		Fighter
Nieuport 24bis	12	Fighter
Sopwith 1½ Strutter	72	Multi-role biplane
SPAD VII	1	Fighter

== See also ==
- Arsenalul Aeronautic
- Romanian Air Corps
- List of aircraft of the Romanian Air Force

== Bibliography ==
- Avram, Valeriu; Armă, Alexandru (2018). Aeronautica română în Războiul de Întregire națională 1916-1919 (in Romanian). Editura Vremea. ISBN 978-973-645-853-8.
- Balotescu, Nicolae (1984). Istoria aviației române (in Romanian). Bucharest: Editura Științifică și Enciclopedică. OCLC 895118866.
- Antoniu, Dan (2014). Illustrated History of Romanian Aeronautics. Bucharest. ISBN 978-973-0-17209-6.
