= Cerchez & Co. =

Romanian aircraft company

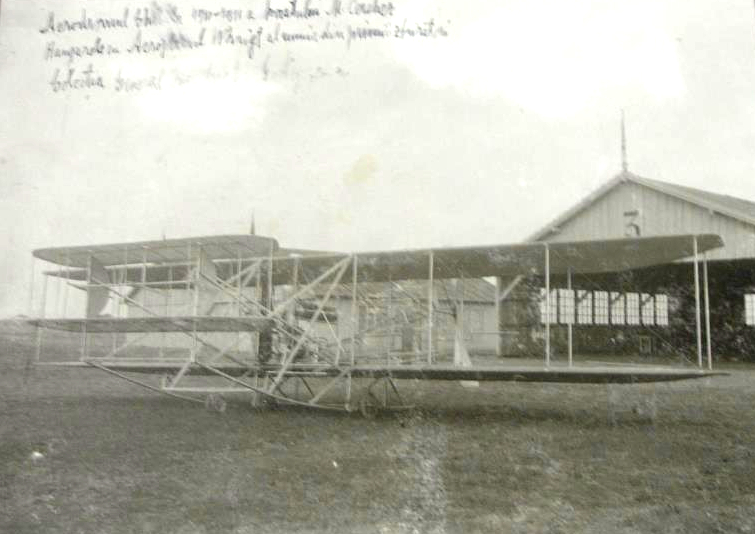
- Wright Model A biplane at Chitila
- Industry: Aerospace
- Founded: 1909
- Founder: Mihail Cerchez
- Defunct: 1912
- Fate: Bankruptcy
- Headquarters: Chitila, Romania
- Area served: Romania
- Key people: Robert Catargi; Michel-Paul Molla

Cerchez & Co. was the first aircraft company, the first aerodrome and the first flight school in Romania. The company was founded and registered on 20 November 1909, being inaugurated on 11 June 1910 by the lawyer and industrialist Mihail Cerchez. The company manufactured the first serial production aircraft in Romania in 1911.

== History ==
On 20 November 1909, the "Cerchez & Co." company was registered at the Ministry of Industry and Trade, based at Chitila near Bucharest. The inauguration of the complex took place on 11 June 1910. On the same day, a telegram was addressed to the Ministry of War, requesting support for developing the construction of aircraft at Chitila. This was the first official document issued in Romania for the aeronautics field.

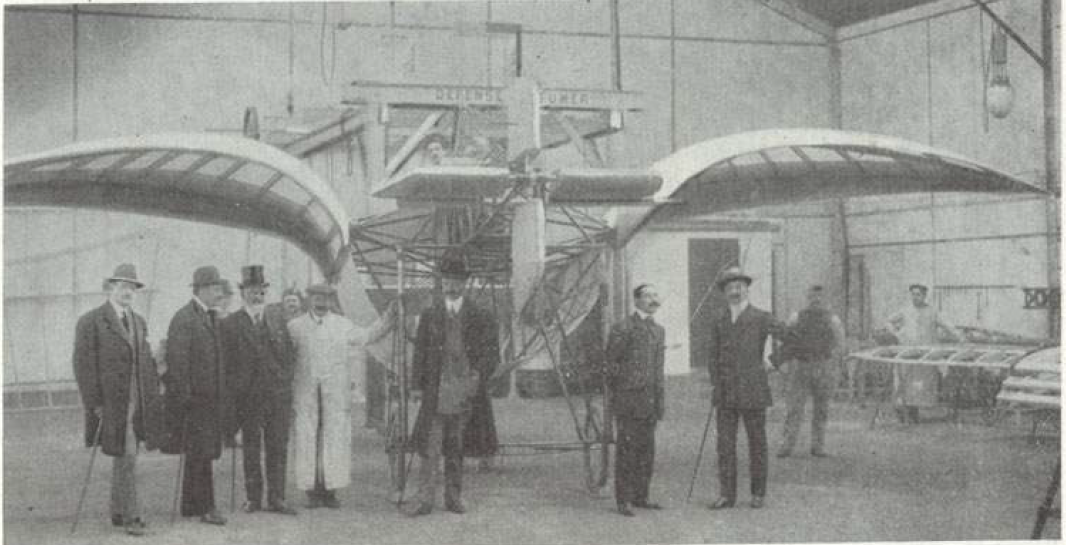
The Goliescu Avioplan in the hangar at Port-Aviation ("Juvisy Airfield") in Viry-Châtillon, 1909

With Order no. 2900 of 6 July 1910, Major Ioan Macri, commander of the Batalionul 2 Pionieri (2nd Pioneer Battalion), was commissioned by the Ministry of War to visit the "Aerodrome" in Chitila for evaluation. At that time, the aerodrome had the following aircraft: a Farman biplane, a Wright biplane, a Santos-Dumont Demoiselle which didn't yet have an engine mounted, and Lieutenant Goliescu's aircraft which was disassembled. Following his visit, he proposed that two officers be sent to Chitila to learn to fly and to follow the aircraft manufacturing process.

The company hired the French pilot Guillemin as head of the piloting school and instructor. However, after an accident, he was replaced by Michel-Paul Molla. On 14 August 1910, the Cerchez & Co. workshops finished the first license-built Henry Farman model 1910 for use as a school plane. The next day, the aerodrome at Chitila was open to the public, with Michel-Paul Molla performing two flights on the Farman biplane. On 23 August, Molla took off towards Cotroceni (an aerodrome and a piloting school will be established here in 1911) where Prince George Valentin Bibescu was training on his Blériot monoplane and Aurel Vlaicu on his Vlaicu I. The three of them performed some flights together around Cotroceni with their aircraft, after which Molla returned to Chitila.

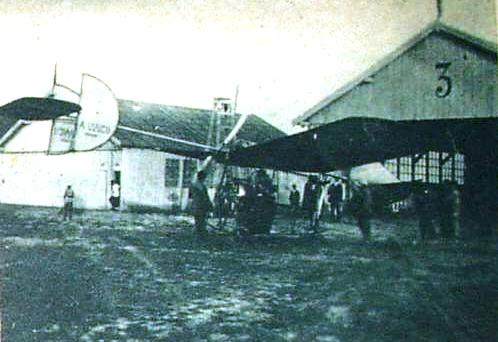
Vlaicu during a visit at the Cerchez & Co. airfield in 1910

On 25 August 1910, Molla flew for the first time over Bucharest, landing on the Șoseaua Kiseleff before returning to the aerodrome. This was the second flight over a city in the world, being preceded by Émile Dubonnet's flight over Paris in April 1910.

In April 1911, the Ministry of War ordered 4 Farmans from the workshops of Cerchez & Co, this order was followed by another for 2 more Farmans. The first officers also started their pilot training, with Sublocotenent Ștefan Protopopescu receiving the first pilot license in Romania and becoming the first pilot of the Romanian Army.

The first Farmans were delivered to the army in August and September 1911. Polihroniade "Poly" Vacas delivered the 4th plane at Roman in September, where the autumn military maneuvers were taking place, setting a new national distance record of 138 kilometres (86 mi) traveled in flight from Focșani to Roman.

After the delivery of the last aircraft, the Ministry of War did not issue any new orders for aircraft construction and did not send new officers to the piloting school. At the initiative of Prince George Valentin Bibescu, a military piloting school was set up in Cotroceni, and orders went to factories in France. At the end of 1912, Mihail Cerchez was forced to declare bankruptcy of the company.

== Legacy ==
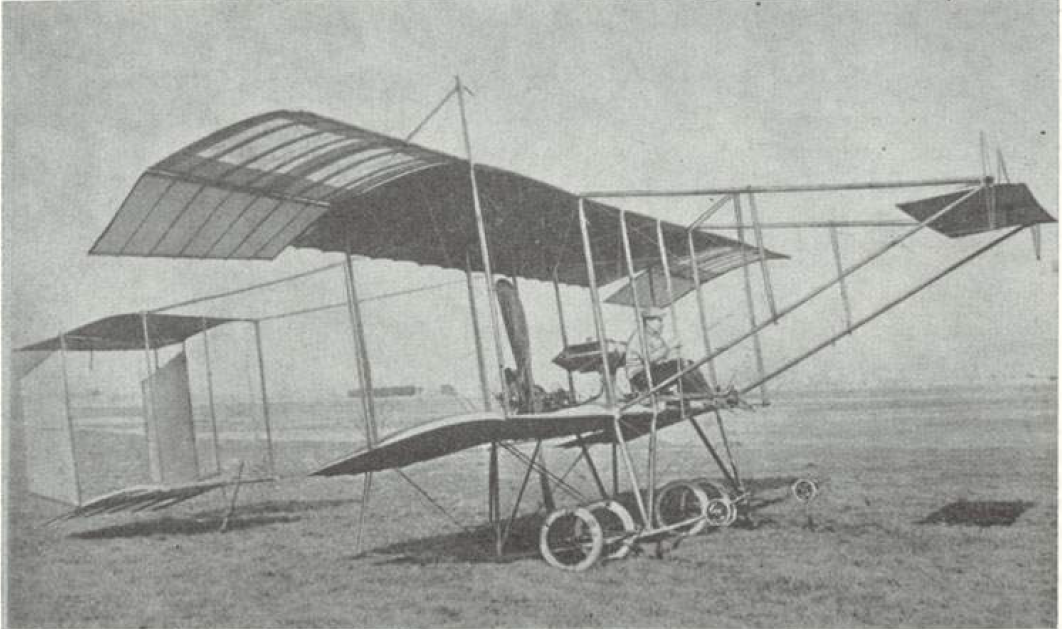
A Farman III built at the Cerchez & Co. workshops from Chitila

Cerchez & Co. manufactured a total of 7 Henry Farman aircraft, 1 in 1910 for the school and 6 in 1911 for the military. Six military pilots and six civilian pilots were trained at the flight school, the company remaining in the history of world aviation as one of the first in the world to serially produce aircraft.

The next initiative to start an aeronautical industry in Romania happened in 1915, however it was not successful either due to lack of funding.

== See also ==
- Aviation in Romania
- Arsenalul Aeronautic
- Rezerva generală a aviației
- Farman Aviation Works
- Wright Company, also founded in 1909
