= Astra-Protopopescu =

Romanian reconnaissance aircraft prototype

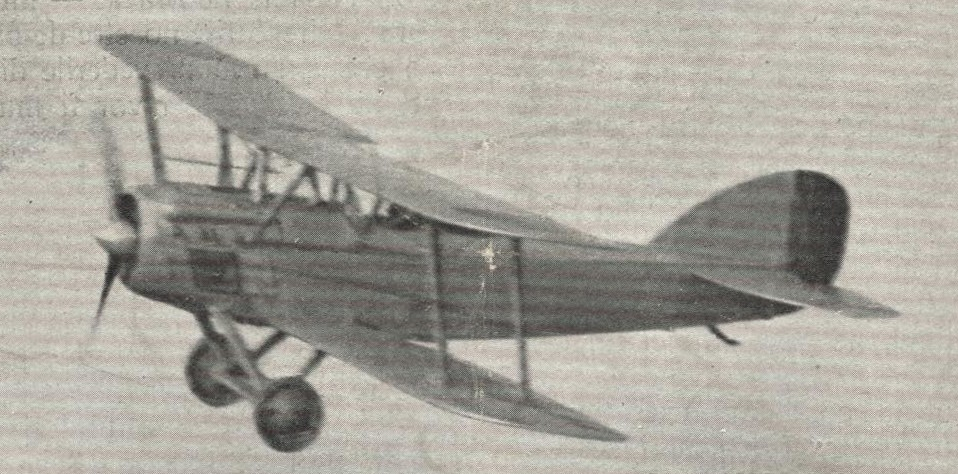
- Astra-Proto in flight

General information
- Type: Reconnaissance aircraft
- National origin: Romania
- Manufacturer: Astra Aircraft Factory
- Designer: Ștefan Protopopescu
- Number built: 1

History
- First flight: Early 1925

The Astra-Protopopescu or Astra-Proto was a Romanian reconnaissance aircraft flown and tested in 1925.

== Design and development ==
The Astra-Proto, designed by Lieutenant-Colonel Ștefan Protopopescu and built by the Astra Aircraft Factory at Arad was intended as a reconnaissance aircraft. It was a biplane with constant chord wings, straight-edged and slightly swept at about 2°. Their tips were rounded. The lower wing was a little shorter and smaller in area, providing 47% of the total. The structure of the wings, like that of the rest of the aircraft, was entirely wood and they were each built around two spars. It was a single bay biplane with significant stagger; the wings were relatively displaced horizontally by 300 mm (12 in) and separated vertically by 1,570 mm (62 in). The bay was formed by a parallel pair of interplane struts on each side, together with bracing wires; each pair of struts leaned forwards because of the stagger and also slightly outwards. The central upper wing was joined to the upper fuselage by cabane struts. These leaned outwards at the front and rear of the wing, the latter supplemented with a central, transverse inverted V-pair. Only the upper wing carried the long ailerons which occupied about 60% of the span.

Its engine was a 220 kW (300 hp) Hispano-Suiza 8F water-cooled V-8 with its radiator in the nose. The fuselage was basically of rectangular cross-section, though the upper fuselage was formed by a curved decking. The pilot's open cockpit was under the upper wing trailing edge; both the upper and lower trailing edges had cut-outs to improve his view. The observer/gunner sat in a second cockpit immediately behind the pilot, equipped with dual controls as well as cameras and radio. Three machine guns could also be mounted there. The fuselage tapered aft to conventional, unbalanced tail surfaces with a continuously curved tailplane and elevators positioned near the top of the fuselage. The fin and rudder were also smoothly curved together; the latter extended to the keel and worked in a rounded elevator cut-out.

The Astra-Protopopescu had a conventional, fixed tailskid undercarriage. A short V-form strut was attached to each lower fuselage longeron, joined by a cross-piece at their apexes, above which a single axle bearing the main wheels was rubber sprung. The wooden tailskid was also rubber sprung.

The exact date of the first flight of the Astra-Protopopescu is not known but its tests had been concluded by June 1925. Though the results were satisfactory and although it met the requirements set by the Romanian Ministry for War, no orders for serial production were received.

== Specifications ==
Data from Les Ailes June 1925, Romanian Aeronautical Constructions 1905 - 1974

General characteristics

- Crew: Two
- Length: 7.20 m (23 ft 7 in)
- Upper wingspan: 10.60 m (34 ft 9 in)
- Height: 2.90 m (9 ft 6 in)
- Wing area: 17.10 m^{2} (184.1 sq ft) upper wing, lower 14.90 m^{2} (160.4 sq ft)
- Airfoil: Heilbronn
- Empty weight: 1,010 kg (2,227 lb)
- Gross weight: 1,488 kg (3,280 lb)
- Powerplant: 1 × Hispano-Suiza 8F water-cooled V-8, 220 kW (300 hp)
- Propellers: 2-bladed

Performance

- Maximum speed: 205 km/h (127 mph, 111 kn) at ground level
- Stall speed: 98 km/h (61 mph, 53 kn)
- Service ceiling: 6,100 m (20,000 ft)
- Time to altitude: 26 min to 4,000 m (13,000 ft)

== See also ==
- Proto 1
- Proto 2 (aircraft)
- Astra Aircraft Factory
