= Maurice Gond =

French flying ace (1884–1964)

Maurice Roch Gond
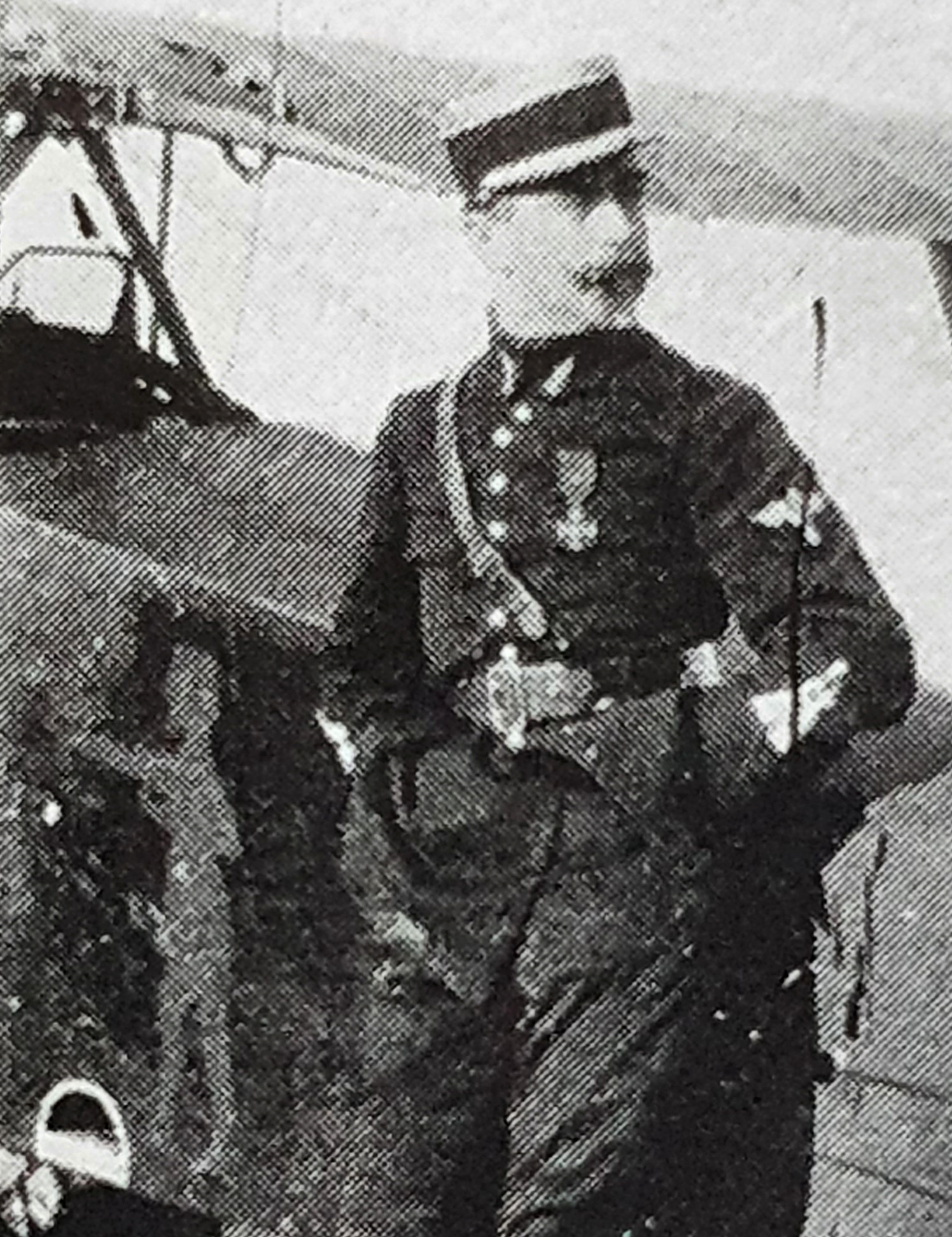
- Gond next to his Nieuport 11
- Born: 31 May 1884; Joigny, France
- Died: 11 May 1964 (aged 79); Paris, France
- Military career
- Allegiance: France
- Branch: Aéronautique Militaire; Romanian Air Corps
- Service years: 1902 - 1943
- Rank: Colonel
- Unit: Escadrille 67
- Commands: Escadrila N.3 (N.3 Squadron)
- Awards: Legion d'Honneur; Croix de Guerre; Order of the Star of Romania; Order of Michael the Brave; Romania's Legion of Merit; Order of Saint George; Mentioned in dispatches
- Other work: Served in French Air Force until 1943

Colonel Maurice Roch Gond (31 May 1884 – 11 May 1964) was a World War I flying ace who played a much more important role in his nation's affairs than six aerial victories might suggest. He was a professional soldier who worked his way up from Soldat to officer's rank in active colonial service from 1902 to 1912. He was serving as a lieutenant in the Dragoons when World War I began on 26 June 1914. During the first year of World War I, he won two citations for valor.

Gond then switched to aviation duty, becoming an aerial observer in September 1915. After gaining flight experience, he was trained as a pilot and flew a Caudron G.4. After he completed advanced training, he was appointed to the French Military Mission to the Kingdom of Romania after that nation's entry into World War I on 27 August 1916. During the year he served in Romania, Gond was an inspirational, courageous, and diplomatic leader of the Escadrille Franco-Roumaine N3 or Escadrila N.3 in Romanian. The unit was under-equipped and out-numbered, but fought valiantly. Gond's personal reconnaissance flights were just as important to the Romanians as his aerial victories. Gond was invalided back to France in September 1917, accruing several honors along the way. He served out the war as an instructor at Avord Air Base.

Maurice remained in the French Air Force, serving in ever more responsible posts until his retirement in 1943 with 41 years of service. He died on 11 May 1964 in Paris.

== Early life and service ==
Maurice Roch Gond entered life on 31 May 1884 in Joigny, France. He came from a rural family of modest means, but had ambitions to further himself. To do so, he joined the French Army's Fifth Infantry Regiment as a Soldat on 6 June 1902, just past his 18th birthday. He was shipped out to Africa to help police France's colonies. Later, he was transferred to the 30e Regiment of Dragoons. He was promoted to the rank of Lieutenant in October 1912. On 30 July 1914, his unit was mobilized for wartime service.

== World War I ==
=== Service in France ===
Gond won two citations during late 1914 while serving in the Dragoons. After a year with them, he took an opportunity to switch to aviation. Escadrille 67 was formed on 17 September 1915, and needed personnel. On 20 September, Gond began training as an aerial observer. On 24 September 1915, Gond was posted to the new escadrille as one of its founding members. The new unit earned plaudits, though Gond was not specifically mentioned.

He was sent to pilot's training at Buc. He earned Pilot's Brevet number 2905, awarded 4 February 1916, and was transferred to Escadrille 64, a Caudron G.4 unit. His second bout of training in July 1916 brought him an additional Brevet, number 3821.

=== Service in Romania ===
On 27 August 1916, the Kingdom of Romania finally entered the war despite its unreadiness. The Treaty of Bucharest committed the French to supplying war materiel and manpower to the Romanian war effort. A French Military Mission was formed to aid the Romanians. An aviation contingent of 42 officers, 45 non-commissioned officers, and 162 enlisted men was included. There were 18 pilots in the contingent, including Maurice Gond. He was posted to the mission on 4 October 1916. He was one of several French pilots who checked in at Romanian air service headquarters on 28 October 1916, coincidental with a Romanian strategy session. Gond's friendly initiative in introducing himself caught Romanian attention. Romanian Captain Cholet, one of those greeted, wrote, "Gond was short, and he wasn't young, but he had such piercing eyes! I was struck by his warm and reliable look."

Gond was assigned to Escadrila N3 of the 2nd Aeronautical Group, based at Pipera for defense of nearby Bucharest. On 12 November 1916, while on a reconnaissance flight, he spotted an enemy pontoon bridge across the Danube River. The improvised bridge was the prelude to a successful enemy offensive that pushed the Romanians back behind the Siret River. On 8 December, the squadron moved to Tecuci; Gond moved by land instead of air because the unit had more pilots than aircraft. Once at its new base, the squadron busied itself with reconnoitering the new enemy positions for about a month while undergoing fleeting raids from enemy aircraft because the two sides' airfields were only 30 km apart.

On 14 January 1917, a German two-seater pulled an inadvertent touch-and-go landing on N3's airfield. Gond took off in pursuit of the fleeing enemy, with no luck. The following day, Romanian pilot, Nicolae Capșa, moved up from command of the escadrila to head up the Third Aeronautical Group. Gond succeeded to the squadron's command, though ten days later, Romanian Captain Ștefan Protopopescu was appointed as co-commander. The two captains shared command duties amicably.

On 6 February 1917, Grand Duke Alexander Mikhailovich of Russia decorated three members of the squadron and congratulated Gond on his unit's performance. However, after this, the lack of spares for maintenance began to tell on the escadrila. At one point, Gond reported that there was only one of six Nieuports airworthy for eight pilots. Three of the Nieuports were unarmed. There was a shortage of ammunition for the rest, especially tracer and incendiary bullets, and gun jams in combat were an ongoing problem. However, the unit carried on, with Gond escorting a Russian general's reconnaissance flight over his front in late March. On 13 April 1917, Gond and Charles Revol-Tissot clashed with a Fokker Eindekker over Focșani and aborted its mission. As a result, on the 18th, Gond was cited and Revol-Tissot commissioned as an officer.

Gond made a personal foray for supplies. In early Summer 1917, the needed materiel began to arrive to aid the escadrila in its fighting in the Battle of Mărășești. By this time, Gond had quite a reputation. He was renowned for his stamina in never failing to fly a mission, his instructional abilities, and his even disposition. His example inspired his subordinates to emulate him.

On 20 July 1917 at 9.15 in the morning, he shot down a German airplane which crashed near Ciușlea, while flying on Nieuport no. 1909.

One of the squadron's pilots, Sergeant Texier, suffered a belly wound during combat on 15 August 1917. Gond was credited with his sixth victory on 16 August 1917. His triumph was overshadowed by the death of Texier that evening. The following day, King Ferdinand I arrived at the Tecuci Airfield to posthumously honor Texier, and to award Gond the Order of the Star of Romania with Swords.

Maurice Gond's service in Romania earned him an award as a Chevalier of the Legion of Honor on 21 August 1917:

"An excellent pilot and Chef d'Escadrille, who has shown himself through his courage on several difficult missions, especially during the operations of 24 July. He has already downed six enemy planes, one being on 23 July 1917.

That same night, Gond flew a crucial night reconnaissance, bringing back intelligence about enemy troops in the vicinity of Mărășești. A week later, on 28 August 1917, he suffered an inflight eye injury. The inflamed eye not only failed to respond to medical treatment, but worsened. Gond was medically relieved from duty, turning over command to Capitaine Mallet on 20 September. He was granted the Russian Order of Saint George Fourth Class before departing for France on 24 September 1917.

=== Return to France ===
Maurice Gond continued to accrue acclaim during his return journey to France. On 4 October 1917, by decree of King Ferdinand, was granted Romania's Order of Michael the Brave Third Class. On 21 October 1917, the entirety of Escadrila N.3 was cited in orders:

"Escadrille Franco-Roumaine N3, under the command of Capitaine Gond, who has demonstrated to all his pilots his valiant ardor and high sense of devotion. Escadrille N3 has never ceased fighting for a year, and has been a living example to all of courage, devotion and self-sacrifice. Although provided with inferior materiel to that of the enemy to take flight each time, and have downed ten airplanes."

On 24 December 1917, Gond was confirmed in rank as Capitaine.

Gond returned to France in early 1918, and was assigned to train Romanian student pilots. By April 1918, he was the chief instructor at Avord Air Base. He served as an instructor until the war's end.

== Post World War I ==
He continued to serve in the French military, rising to the rank of Colonel. He commanded both a wing and a base at Toulouse during his career. He was also raised to the grade of Officer in the Legion of Honor in 1928. He was also honored with the Romanian Cross of Merit before his retirement in 1943.

Maurice Roch Gond died in the Paris suburb of Asnières on 11 May 1964. He was interred in his family's cemetery plot.
