= Charles Revol-Tissot =

French World War I flying ace

Charles A. Revol-Tissot
- Born: 2 June 1892; Paris, France
- Died: 13 July 1971 (aged 79)
- Military career
- Allegiance: France
- Branch: Aéronautique Militaire; Romanian Air Corps
- Rank: Second Lieutenant
- Units: Escadrille BL3; Escadrille N.38; Escadrila N.3
- Awards: Légion d'honneur Médaille militaire Croix de Guerre; Virtutea Militară

Adjutant Charles Alfred Revol-Tissot (French: [ʃaʁl ʁəvɔl tiso]) was a French World War I flying ace credited with five aerial victories.

== Biography ==
Charles Alfred Revol-Tissot was born on 2 June 1892 in Paris.

His youthful interest in aviation led him to learn to fly; he received Civil Pilot's Licence No. 1248 on 1 March 1913. When World War I began the following year, he ended up as a pilot in Escadrille BL.3. He was awarded the Médaille Militaire on 15 June 1915.

In 1916, he was transferred to Escadrille N.38 as a Nieuport fighter pilot. He survived a mid-air collision. Then he was transferred to the Eastern Front to fly for the Romanians as part of the French Military Mission, being assigned to Escadrila N.3. While flying for Romania, Tissot shot down 2 German aircraft and shared a third victory in 1917.

On 14 February (other sources say 15 February), Adjutant Revol-Tissot shot down a German Albatros which crashed in flames near Diocheți. On 13 April, he shot down another German aircraft. Following this victory he was commissioned as an officer with the rank of Second Lieutenant.

On 16 April, during the afternoon, he attacked an Albatros with Corporal Maurice Théron, the enemy airplane crashing near Focșani. The victory was shared with Théron. His final score in Romania is 2 victories. (Note: By Romanian victory standards the shared victory was not counted. However, French pilots of the Military Mission might have counted their victories using French standards.)

In 1917, he returned to Escadrille N.38. He is also credited with prior victories during 1916, though details are unknown. After he became a flying ace, he was awarded the Legion d'honneur.

Charles Alfred Revol-Tissot died on 13 July 1971, location unknown.

== Honors and awards ==
- Chevalier de la Légion d'Honneur

"Adjudant pilot, energetic and adroit, he knows that by his example of ardor and courage, the young pilots of his Escadrille will follow him. On 15 February 1917, he downed a German plane which crashed to the ground behind our lines."

- Médaille Militaire

"Sergent pilot of the Army Air Service; pilot of the first order, courageous to the point of rashness, very close and very sure. Demonstrated his qualitites of courage and sang-froid on 26 March when, during a reconnaissance, his plane was very heavily fired upon and was hit several places by shrapnel, but he did not waver for an instant from the mission entrusted him. He particularly distinguished himself in the cooperation of his Escadrille during the operations of 5, 6 and 7 June."

- Virtutea Militară 2nd Class - while flying for Romania.

== See also ==
- Maurice Gond - commander of Escadrila N.3
