= Astra-Șeșefschi =

Two-seat Romanian reconnaissance aircraft

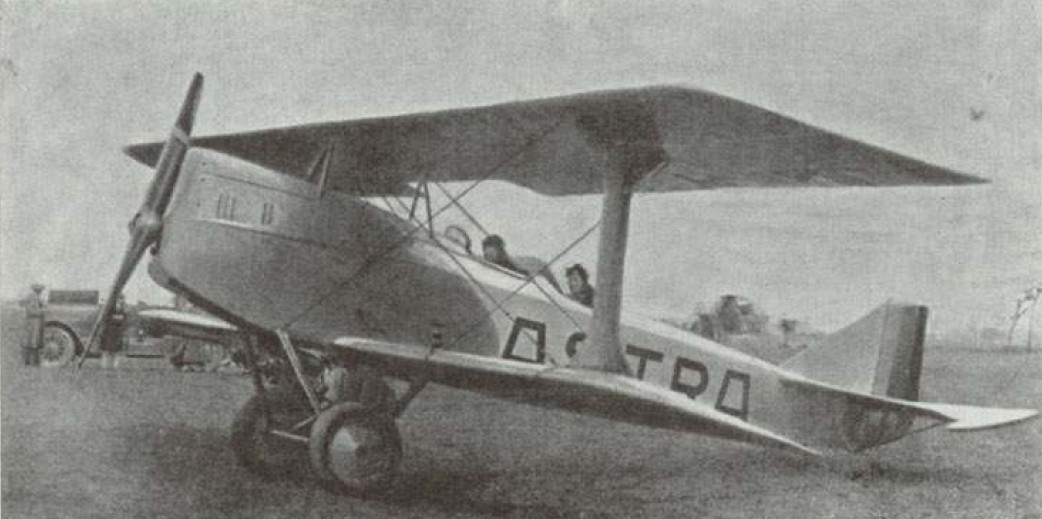
- The Astra-Șeșefschi airplane

General information
- Type: Military reconnaissance aircraft
- National origin: Romania
- Manufacturer: Astra Aircraft Factory
- Designer: Stanislav Șeșefschi
- Number built: 1

History
- First flight: c. August 1923

The Astra-Șeșefschi was a two-seat Romanian reconnaissance aircraft designed and built in 1923.

== Design and development ==
The Astra Aircraft Factory was an aircraft manufacturer in Romania that operated from 1923 to 1925. The factory was created by the merging of the ro:Marta factory and the ro:Weitzer wagon factory. Astra-Șeșefschi, named after its designer, was a wholly Romanian designed aircraft apart from its engine.

The Șeșefschi was an all-wood machine, like many in the 1920s but also because timber was then an important Romanian export. It was a single bay biplane with two-spar wings mounted with noticeable stagger and braced with a single, broad, forward-leaning interplane strut on each side, assisted by wire cross-bracing. The upper wing was braced over the fuselage on two transverse, inverted-V cabane struts and the lower one was mounted on the lower fuselage longerons. Both wings were near-rectangular in plan apart from blunted tips but they were of different size, the lower smaller in both span and chord by about 15%. Unlike the upper wing, the lower one carried slight dihedral. Only the upper wing carried ailerons, which were short, reached to the wingtips and broadened as they did so.

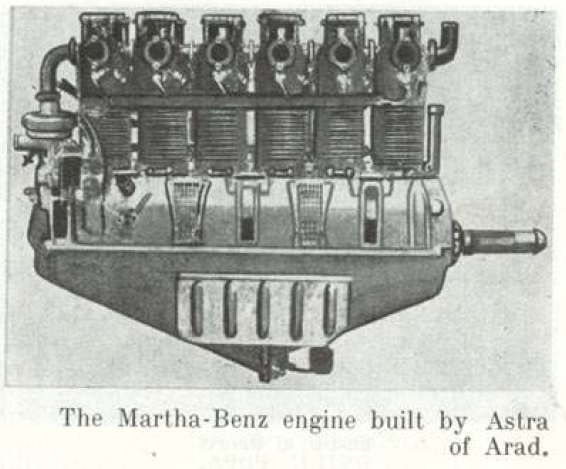
6-cylinder Martha-Benz engine

The biplane was powered by a 190 kW (250 hp) 250 hp Marta-Benz engine, a six-cylinder, water-cooled, upright inline built at Astra. It was cooled with a pair of cylindrical Lamblin radiators attached to the undercarriage legs. The tall engine cowling made the nose deep, but as it reduced rearwards into a rounded decking over a rectangular section structure the fuselage became more slender. Its pilot's cockpit was just behind the wing trailing edge, which had a broad cut-out in it to improve his upward and forward field of view. Close behind there was a second cockpit for the observer. The pilot controlled a single, fixed machine gun firing through the propeller disc and the observer had a pair of guns on a flexible mount. He also had a radio and a camera.

At the rear the triangular fin, built of plywood, was an integral part of the fuselage and carried a generous, deep, rounded rudder. The Șeșefschi's horizontal tail was mounted on top of the fuselage. The angle of incidence of its triangular plan tailplane could be adjusted on the ground and split elevators had a small, central gap to allow rudder movement. It had a simple, tailskid undercarriage with its mainwheels on a single axle, each end elastically sprung from a V-strut mounted on the lower longeron. The tailskid had its own shock absorber.

The exact date of the first flight of the Șeșefschi is not known but it was reported as "just having made satisfactory tests" in September 1923.

== Specifications ==
3 view drawing

Data from Flight, January 1924

General characteristics

- Crew: Two
- Length: 8.59 m (28 ft 2 in)
- Wingspan: 12.60 m (41 ft 4 in)
- Height: 3.10 m (10 ft 2 in)
- Wing area: 36.6 m^{2} (394 sq ft)
- Empty weight: 1,120 kg (2,469 lb)
- Gross weight: 1,620 kg (3,571 lb)
- Powerplant: 1 × Martha-Benz 6-cylinder, water-cooled inline, 190 kW (250 hp) maximum, at 1,650 rpm
- Propellers: 2-bladed, 2.8 m (9 ft 2 in) diameter wooden fixed pitch

Performance

- Maximum speed: 185 km/h (115 mph, 100 kn) at ground level
- Service ceiling: 5,500 m (18,000 ft)
- Maximum glide ratio: 8:1
- Time to altitude: 13 min 52 sec to 2,000 metres (6,600 ft)
- Landing speed: 90 km/h (56 mph)

Armament

- 1 × machine gun firing through propeller disc
- 2 × machine guns on flexible mount in rear cockpit
