= Astra Aircraft Factory =

Romanian aircraft manufacturer

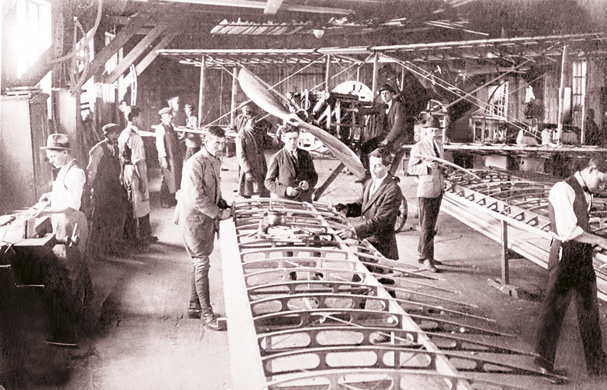
- A Proto 1 under construction at the factory
- Industry: Aerospace
- Predecessor: Marta factory Weitzer wagon factory
- Founded: 1923
- Defunct: 1925
- Fate: Integrated into IAR
- Headquarters: Arad, Romania
- Area served: Romania
- Key people: Andrei Popovici

The Astra Aircraft Factory (Romanian: Fabrica de avioane Astra) in Arad was the second Romanian factory to build aircraft. Its activity took place between 1923 and 1925, producing four models of aircraft: Astra-Șeșefschi, Proto 1, Proto 2 and Astra-Proto.

== History ==
From 1915, the Marta factory had been producing Austro-Daimler aircraft engines. After the war, the factory was merged with the Weitzer wagon factory, becoming Uzina de Vagoane Astra Arad (the Astra-Arad Wagon Factory).

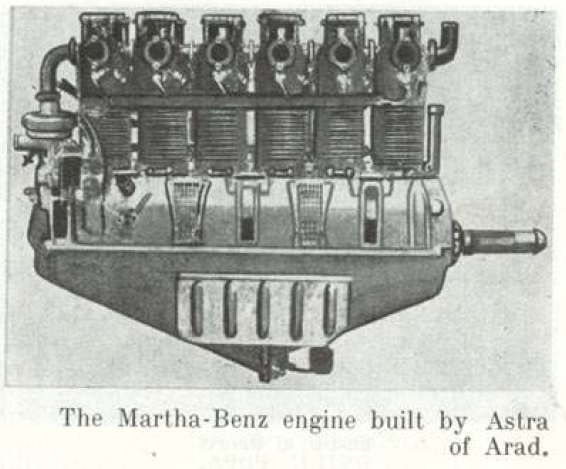
The Martha-Benz 250 hp engine.

In 1923, Comandor Andrei Popovici, former commander of Grupul 2 Aeronautic (2nd Aeronautical Group) became the director of the factory, around the same time the construction of an aircraft prototype began. Conceived and designed by engineer Stanislav Șeșefschi, the aircraft was called Astra-Șeșefschi. Next came the production of Proto 1 and Proto 2 airplanes.

In 1925, Astra built the prototype Astra-Proto, after the design by Major Ștefan Protopopescu. This machine did not reach serial production. That year, airplane production ended because the plant and personnel were transferred to the new IAR. The Astra factory continued to make railway rolling stock, but it also produced 250 hp Martha-Benz aircraft engines.

The senior specialists involved in aircraft construction at Astra included engineers Radu Onciul, Ștefan Urziceanu, Dumitru Barbieri, Stanislav Șeșefschi and Victor Fedorov.

== Manufactured aircraft ==
=== Astra-Șeșefschi ===
The Astra-Șeșefschi aircraft, a two-seater reconnaissance biplane, was the first aircraft built at the Astra Aircraft Factory in 1923. Its designer was engineer Stanislav Șeșefschi. After being tested by Lieutenant Ion Sava, this model of aircraft was sent to several aviation units to verify performance. The pilots Ion Sava and Petre Macavei carried out a non-stop flight from Arad to Bucharest, in only two and a half hours. The airplane was equipped with a 6-cylinder 250 hp Marta-Benz engine, this being the first engine built in Romania that was mounted on board an aircraft that flew.

=== Proto 1 ===
Proto 1 was a biplane used as a school and training aircraft, designed by Major Ștefan Protopopescu in collaboration with engineers Dumitru Baziliu and Gheorghe Ticău. The prototype was produced at the Arsenalul Aeronautic, The qualities of the aircraft led the Ministry of War to order a series of 25 airplanes of this type from the Astra Aircraft Factory. After the accident of Ioan Sava Câmpineanu in 1924, the production of Proto 1 aircraft was stopped, the airplanes were improved and delivered by the Astra factory under the name of Proto 2.

=== Proto 2 ===
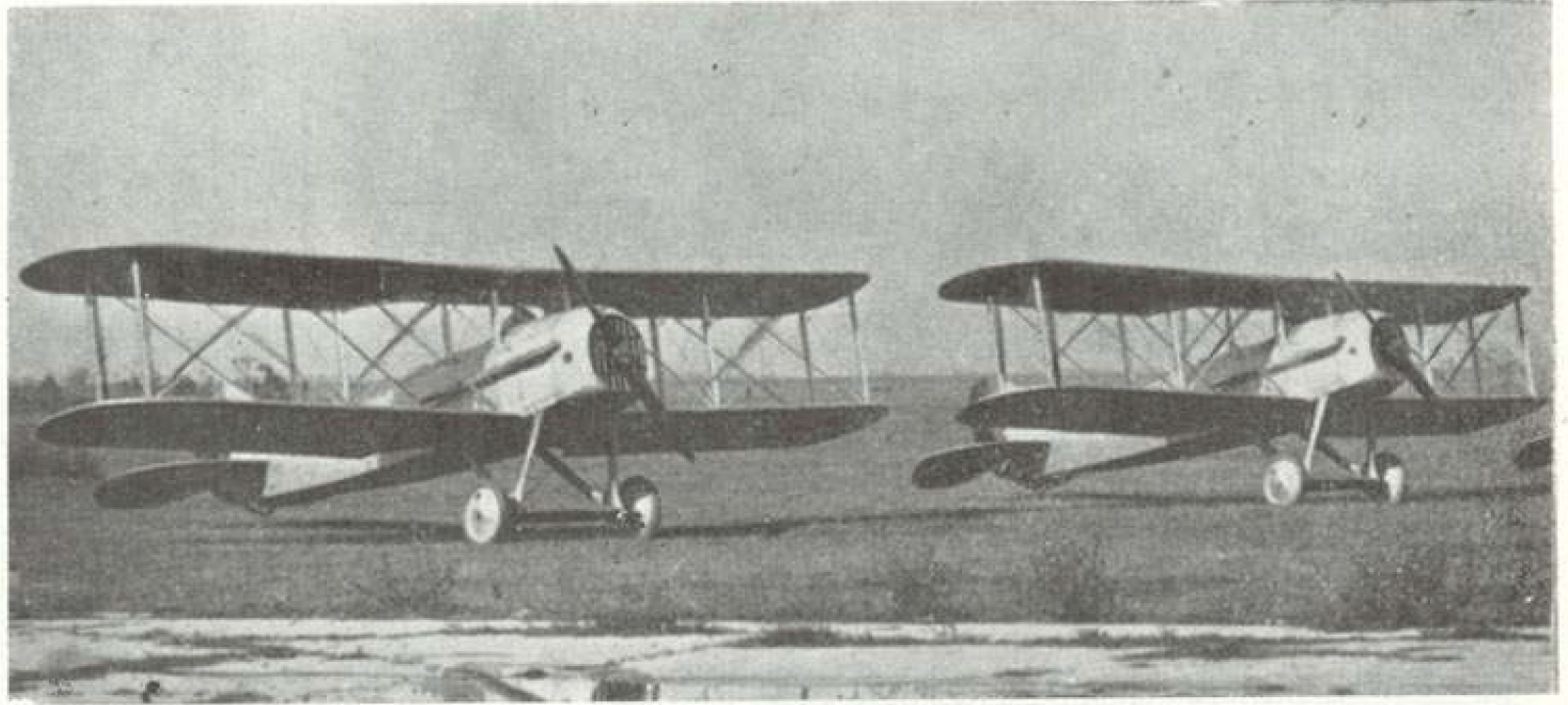
Two parked Proto 2 airplanes

Similar to the Proto 1, the airplane was produced by the Astra factory. Following the conclusions of Ioan Sava's crash, the original design was maintained, but as a safety measure, the structure of the wings was strengthened by increasing the section of the spars and adding another pair of interplane struts. After these improvements, 25 airplanes were built and supplied to the Ministry of War.

=== Astra-Proto ===
Astra-Proto was the last type of aircraft produced by the Astra factory in 1925. It was a biplane for reconnaissance missions, designed by Ștefan Protopopescu. It was powered by a Hispano-Suiza 300 hp engine. The prototype passed its tests successfully and although it met the requirements, the factory did not receive orders for serial production.

== Legacy ==
Despite working for a very short period, the experience gained at the Astra Aircraft Factory was not lost. It was fully integrated in the new aeronautical production center in Brașov, the Industria Aeronautică Română (IAR).

== See also ==
- Aviation in Romania
