= General headquarters (disambiguation) =

A headquarters is a location from which an organization is coordinated.

General Headquarters or GHQ may refer to:

- General Headquarters (Pakistan Army)
- General Headquarters (game), a board game
- GHQ India, of the British Indian Army
- Supreme Commander for the Allied Powers, in occupied Japan, also known as "General Headquarters"
