= Ștefan Protopopescu =

Romanian aviation pioneer

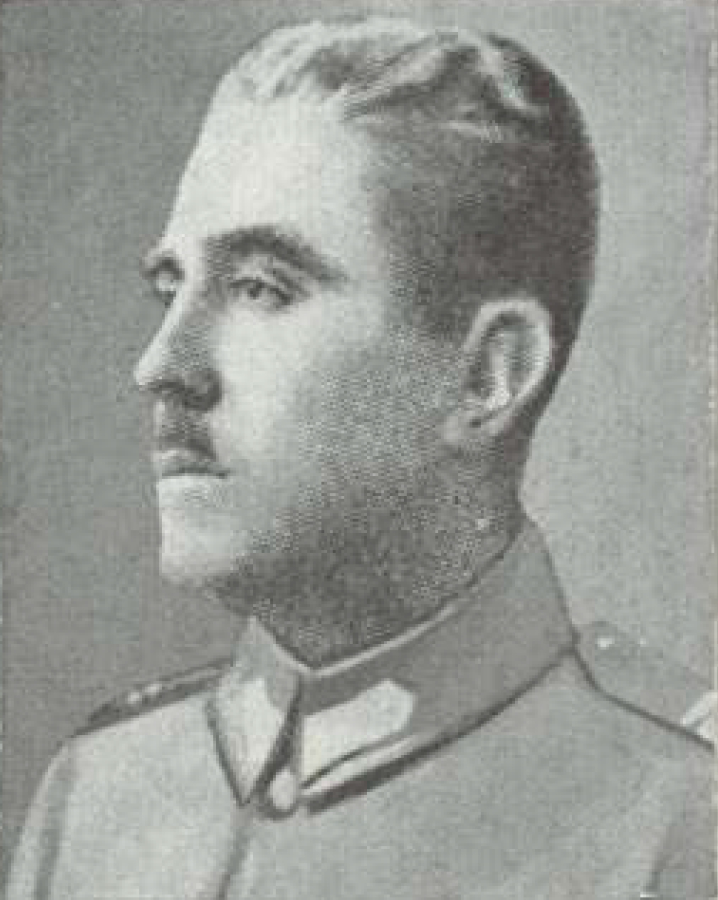
- Major Ștefan Protopopescu, c. 1925
- Nickname: Bîrță
- Born: 14 January 1886; Turnu Severin, Kingdom of Romania
- Died: 10 October 1929 (aged 43) Bucharest, Kingdom of Romania
- Allegiance: Romania
- Branch: Romanian Army (1909-1913); Romanian Air Corps (1913–1924); Romanian Air Force (1924-1929)
- Service years: 1909 (Note: Whether this is the year when he started his military service is unclear.)–1929
- Rank: Lieutenant colonel
- Commands: Escadrila N.11 (N.11 Squadron) (until September 1917); Grupul 1 Aeronautic (1st Aeronautical Group) (from December 1918)
- Conflicts: First World War
- Awards: Virtutea Militară 1st class Order of the Star of Romania; Order of the Crown of Romania; Légion d'honneur

Ștefan Protopopescu (14 January 1886 – 10 October 1929) was a Romanian officer and aviation pioneer, he held the no. 1 pilot license in Romania, being the first licensed pilot in Romania and the first pilot of the Romanian Army.

== Military career ==
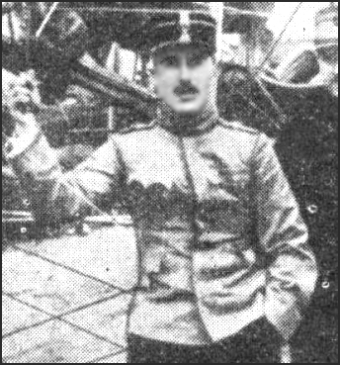
Ștefan Protopopescu in front of an Farman III type airplane, Chitila, Romania

Ștefan Protopopescu, "Bîrță" for friends, was born on 14 January 1886 at Turnu Severin. After graduating from Traian High School in his hometown, he attended the School for Military Engineer Officers in Bucharest, receiving the rank of Sublocotenent. Attracted by aviation, he started pilot training at the flight school from Chitila together with Lt. Stelian Boiangiu, Slt. Nicolae Druțu and Slt. Gheorghe Negrescu. He graduated on 9 July 1911, receiving the no. 1 pilot license in Romania, being followed by Gheorghe Negrescu, who received his license 8 days later.

After getting his license, he participated in the autumn military maneuvers that took place at Pașcani-Roman in September 1911, together with pilots George Valentin Bibescu, Mircea Zorileanu, Gheorghe Negrescu, Nicolae Capșa and Poly Vacas. For his actions, he was decorated, along with the others, with the Virtutea Militară 1st class medal.

Once the maneuvers were finished, Protopopescu carried out an air tour, on the Bucharest-Turnu-Severin route, being accompanied by his colleague, Gheorghe Negrescu, with another airplane. It was the first flight of its kind in Romania. The "raid" began on the morning of 22 October 1911 and was finished on the 27th after some technical difficulties. He also performed the first non-stop flight on the Bucharest-Constanța route.

In the summer of 1912, while flying on a Farman, Protopopescu took part in experiments related to the use of wireless telegraphy for the navy and aviation, considered by some to be among the first in the world. The Gazeta ilustrată of 1912 wrote: "A problem that foreign countries were unable to solve was solved in Romania, thanks to the efforts of Captain Zaharia of the Navy and G. Rotlender; it is the use of Marconi's great invention, wireless telegraphy, via the aeroplane. The experiments made the other day at Constanța have been entirely successful. It was possible to transmit communications easily and accurately from the aeroplane over a distance of 30 kilometres. Knowing that the aeroplane was piloted by Ștefan Protopopescu, it goes without saying that the flying machine behaved wonderfully in the atmosphere during the experiments."

After briefly training other pilots at the Cotroceni flight school, in the autumn of 1912 he was sent to France where he attended the Higher School of Aeronautics and Mechanical Engineering, returning in August 1914 after graduating. On this occasion, he became known among French pilots as an incomparable flyer.

During the First World War, he served in the Grupul 3 Escadrile (3rd Squadron Group) assigned to the 1st Romanian Army. He was then assigned as co-commander of Escadrila N.3, sharing command with Maurice Gond. From the beginning of the summer of 1917, he was tasked with creating a new fighter unit. The new unit was called Escadrila N.11 (N.11 or Nieuport 11 Squadron) and it was a fighter squadron composed of only Romanian airmen with Protopopescu as its first commander. Pilots such as Vasile Craiu, Marcel Drăgușanu, Egon Nasta, Paul Magâlea and Ion Muntenescu, all awarded with the Order of Michael the Brave, were part of this squadron. By the end of the war, the pilots of N.11 squadron obtained 15 air victories. On 6 August 1917, he was slightly wounded in the hands and arm during a dogfight with two enemy airplanes.

From 14 September 1917, Constantin Beroniade became the new commander of the squadron, while Protopopescu was assigned as commander of the Military Piloting School of Odessa. From 1918, he was appointed Director of the Aeronautics and on 15 December, Major Protopopescu received the command of Grupul 1 Aeronautic. After the end of the war, he was appointed commander of the Aeronautical Arsenal.

In 1929, Lieutenant colonel Ștefan Protopopescu will briefly serve as commander of the Aeronautics Training Center.

== Aircraft designer ==
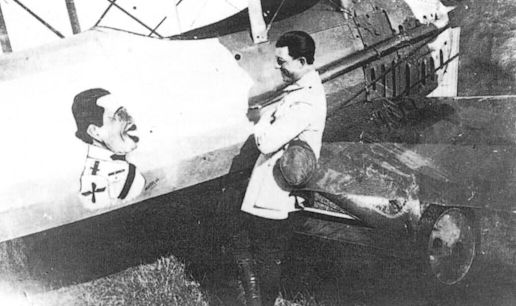
Major Protopopescu face-to-face with his own cartoon portrait painted on the all-white fuselage of the Proto 1.

After the end of World War 1, the problem of manufacturing aircraft in Romania arose as an advantageous solution, able to remove the difficulties that Romanian aviation went through during the war, especially regarding the lack of flight equipment necessary for training. Protopopescu strongly supported the proposal and thus he designed a twin-seat training biplane together with engineers Dumitru Baziliu and Gheorghe Țicău. The airplane was named Proto 1 and was built at the newly established Arsenalul Aeronautic. After the aircraft was finished in 1922, Protopopescu tested it himself.

The qualities of the aircraft led the Ministry of War to order a series of 25 aircraft on 10 January 1923 from the Astra Aircraft Factory. However, the Astra factory did not respect the prescriptions of the prototype made at the Aeronautical Arsenal and changed the frame of the wings at its own initiative, and this led to the death of test pilot Ioan Sava. Following this accident, Protopopescu together with the engineers from Astra improved the design, and the new Proto 2 (aircraft) started production.

Protopopescu went on to design another aircraft at Astra, named Astra-Proto. The airplane was intended for reconnaissance flights and was powered by a Hispano-Suiza 300 hp engine. The prototype passed its tests successfully and although it met the requirements, the factory did not receive orders for serial production.

At the request of the Romanian government, Ștefan Protopopescu drew up a memorandum on the establishment of an aircraft and engine factory, a memorandum supported by the Chief of Staff, Colonel Paul Teodorescu. Following this, the Romanian Parliament adopted the "Law on industrial enterprises in connection with national defense" in 1925. This act will mark the foundation of IAR.

The last aircraft he would design was the Proto-SET-2, another reconnaissance airplane. The design was made in collaboration with engineer Grigore Zamfirescu, the founder of SET. With this airplane, the SET company started its activity. It was powered by the Lorraine-Dietrich 450 hp engine and two prototypes were manufactured, one for static tests and one for flight tests. During one of the test flights, the prototype was damaged when the engine caught fire. Although the flight performances and features of the aircraft were comparable with others that were in service with the Romanian Air Force, there were no orders for mass-production.

== Awards ==
Despite receiving the following awards, he never talked about them and never wore them.

=== Romania ===
- Virtutea Militară 1st class
- Order of the Star of Romania
- Order of the Crown of Romania

=== France ===
- Légion d'honneur

== See also ==
- Proto 1
- Proto 2 (aircraft)
- Arsenalul Aeronautic
- Astra Aircraft Factory
- Cerchez & Co.
