= Arsenalul Aeronautic =

Romanian aircraft manufacturer

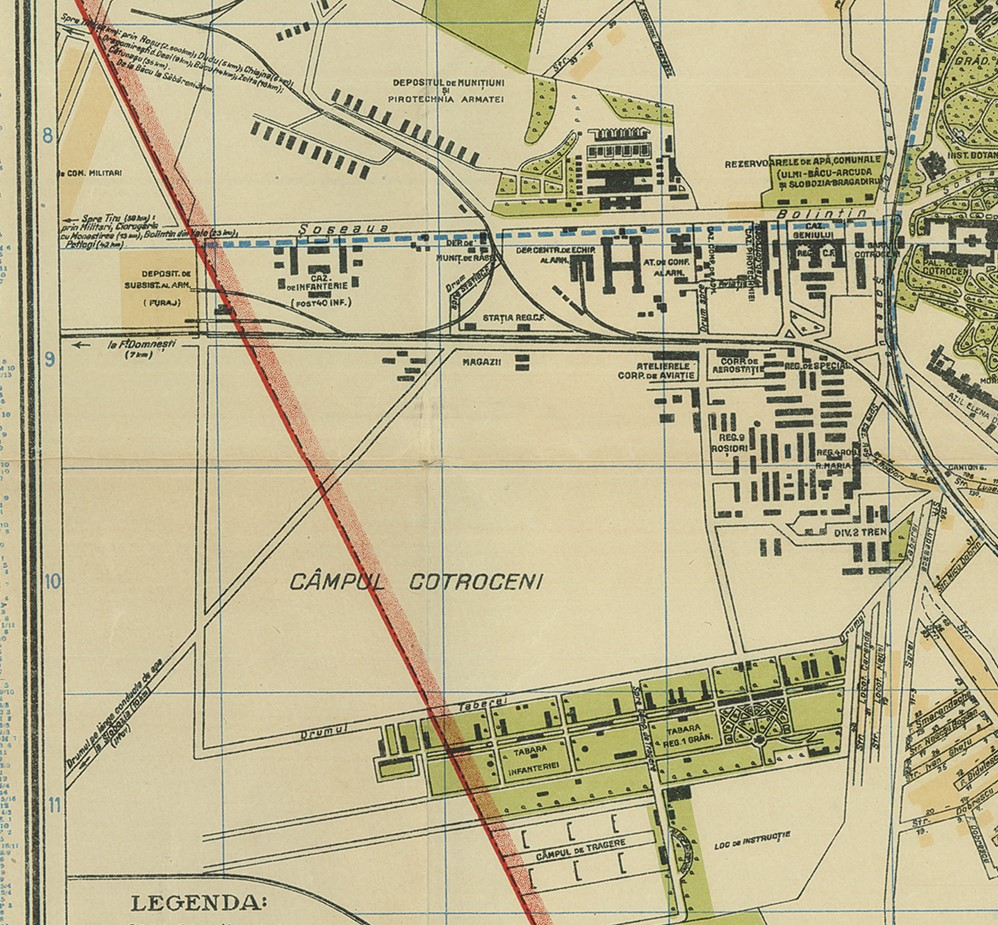
- The Arsenal, marked with "Atelierele Corp de Aviație" on the field of Cotroceni, 1921 map
- Industry: Aerospace
- Predecessor: Rezerva generală a aviației
- Founded: 1919
- Defunct: 1939
- Fate: Became part of ASAM ("Administrația Stabilimentelor Aeronauticii și Marinei - Administration of Air Force and Navy Establishments")
- Headquarters: Bucharest, Romania
- Area served: Romania
- Key people: Ștefan Protopopescu

Arsenalul Aeronautic ("Aeronautical Arsenal" in English) in Bucharest was the first aeronautical factory in Romania, active between 1919 and 1939. Three models of aircraft were manufactured in the factory: Hansa-Brandenburg C.I, Proto 1 and Aeron and modified De Havilland aircraft for passenger and freight transport (aircraft intended for domestic airlines). Also, at the Aeronautical Arsenal, research and testing of materials took place.

== History ==
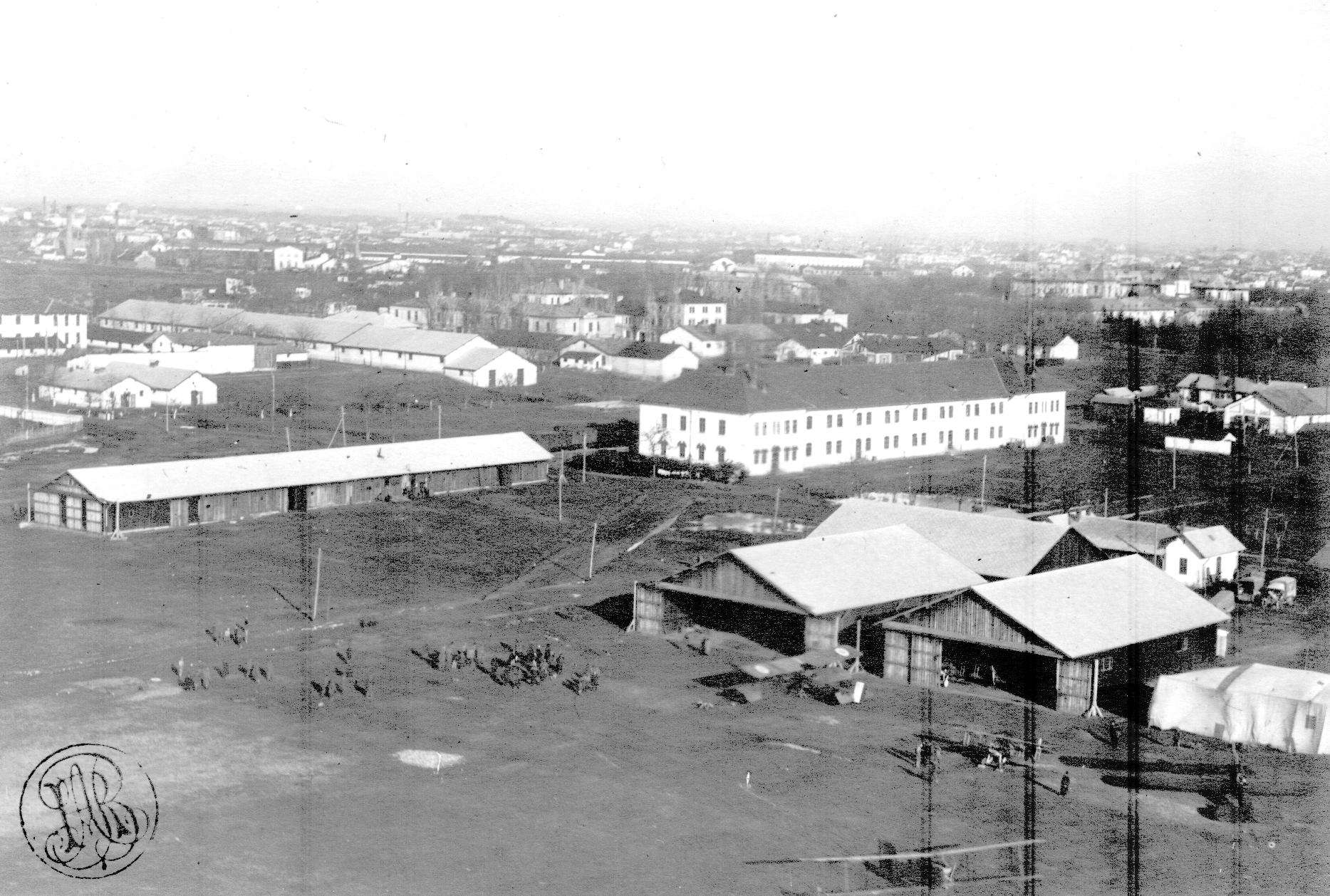
Cotroceni airfield in the 1920s

In November 1919, an aeronautical factory was created in Bucharest on the field of Cotroceni, as a result of the transfer of the material and the majority of the personnel of the Rezerva generală a aviației (General Aviation Reserve or RGA) from Iași. On 1 July 1920, the factory was renamed to the Aeronautical Arsenal. In the beginning, the activity was to repair different types of airplanes and aircraft engines from the endowment of the Romanian military aviation, but after only two years the factory started to build airplanes. The activities specific to the aeronautical industry (repairs, design, manufacture and research) lasted until June 1939, when Arsenalul Aeronautic became part of the Administration of aeronautical and naval establishments.

== Manufactured aircraft ==
=== Hansa-Brandenburg C.I ===
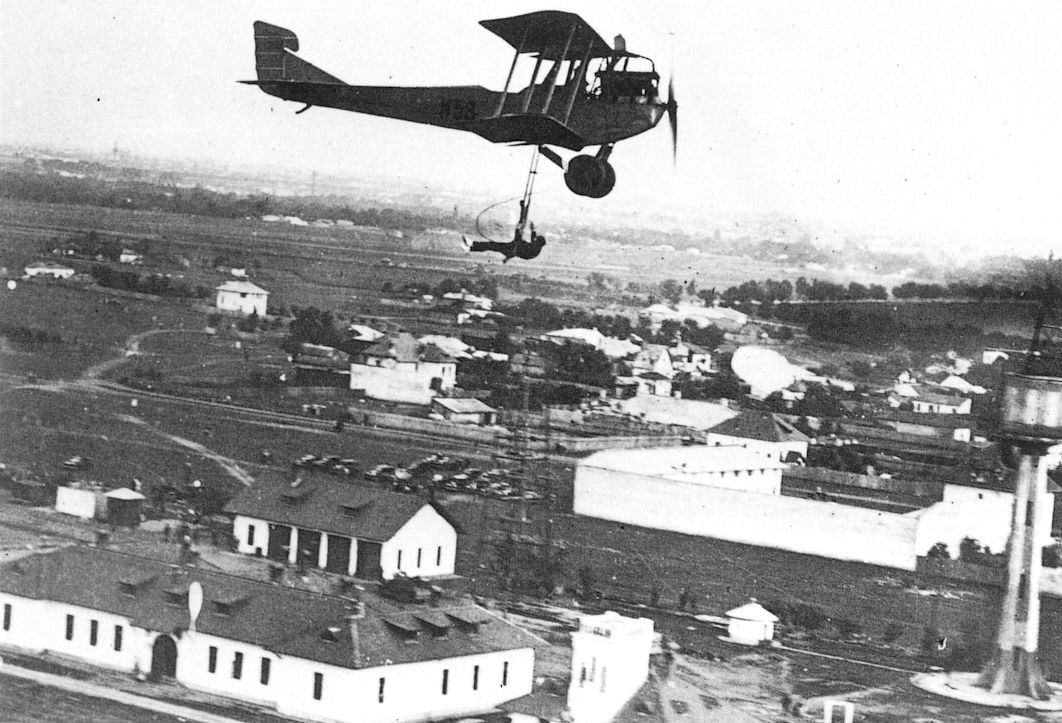
The Romanian built Hansa-Brandenburg C.I No. 58

Hansa-Brandenburg C.I was the first mass-produced aircraft at the Aeronautical Arsenal, starting in 1922. Between 1922 and 1923, 120 aircraft were built. It was a two-seater reconnaissance and observation aircraft and was equipped with the Austro-Daimler 160 hp engine. Until 8 May 1922, 10 units were built, on the fuselage of which was written "Construit în România" ("Made in Romania"). 72 aircraft were built and delivered by the end of 1922.

=== Proto 1 ===
Proto 1 was produced at the Aeronautical Arsenal two years after its establishment, in 1922. It was a biplane used as a school and training aircraft, designed by Major Ștefan Protopopescu in collaboration with engineers Dumitru Baziliu and Gheorghe Ticău. The first experimental flights were performed by Protopopescu himself. The qualities of the aircraft led the Ministry of War to order a series of 25 aircraft of this type from the Fabrica de avioane Astra in Arad. After the accident of Ioan Sava Câmpineanu in 1924, production of Proto 1 aircraft was stopped, the airplanes were improved and delivered by the Fabrica de avioane Astra under the name of Proto 2.

=== Aeron ===
Aeron was a sesquiplane built in 1934, in two variants. The first prototype had a Cirrus 105 hp engine, while the second had a Salmson 120 hp engine. The airplane was designed and built by Lieutenant-Commander Petre Macavei, Captain Cristea Constantinescu, Captain Constantin Istrate and Lieutenant Simion Stănculescu. The novelty brought by this model was that the uneven wings were placed with the lower plane offset from the upper one, there were no struts between the wings.

The Aeron was also flown by French pilot Lepreux, who was greatly satisfied with the behavior of the airplane. Despite its promising features, the aircraft was not mass-produced.

=== Specifications (Salmson engine prototype) ===
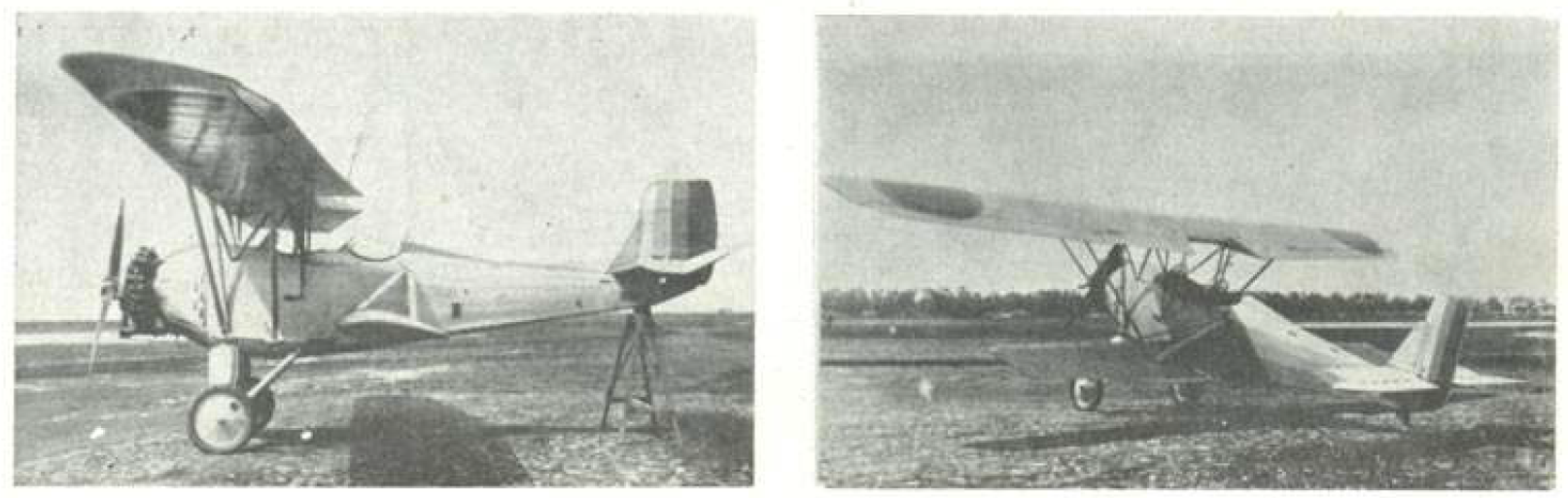
The Aeron aircraft

Data from Romanian Aeronautical Constructions 1905-1974

General characteristics

- Crew: 2
- Length: 6.45 m (21 ft 2 in)
- Wingspan: 9.8 m (32 ft 2 in)
- Height: 2.45 m (8 ft 0 in)
- Empty weight: 760 kg (1,676 lb)
- Gross weight: 1,010 kg (2,227 lb)
- Powerplant: 1 × Salmson 9Ac 120 hp water-cooled radial piston engine, 89 kW (120 hp)
- Propellers: 2-bladed wooden propeller

Performance

- Maximum speed: 187 km/h (116 mph, 101 kn)
- Stall speed: 65 km/h (40 mph, 35 kn)
- Service ceiling: 4,200 m (13,800 ft)

== Other projects ==
=== De Havilland modified ===
The Aeronautical Arsenal also undertook a project to modify the fuselage of De Havilland bombers in order to convert them into aircraft for the transport of passengers or for the transport of goods. These modified De Havilland aircraft were intended for domestic airlines established in Romania. A total of 10 De Havillands were modified, with 6 at the Aeronautical Arsenal and 4 at SET.

=== Research ===
The first laboratory in Romania for the study and testing of materials was set up at the Aeronautical Arsenal. This laboratory was run by Captain Ion Gudju.

In 1923, the installation and the process of manufacturing Emaillite, a varnish used for covering the canvas of airplanes, were designed by engineer Gheorghe Ionescu.

=== Repairs ===
The Aeronautical Arsenal also repaired various aircraft (captured Fokker D.VIIs and Hansa-Brandenburg C.Is, Potez XVs, SPAD XIIIs, etc.) and engines (Austro-Daimler, Hispano-Suiza, Renault etc.).

== See also ==
- Aviation in Romania
- Industria Aeronautică Română
- Fabrica de avioane Astra
- Romaero, former ASAM
