= Proto 1 =

Romanian training biplane

Proto-1
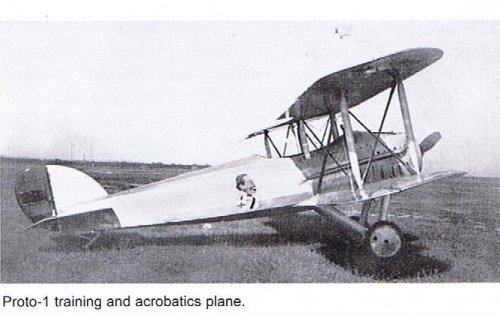
- Proto-1, the first aircraft designed at Arsenalul Aeronautic

General information
- Type: Trainer aircraft
- Manufacturer: Arsenalul Aeronautic; Fabrica de avioane Astra
- Designer: Ștefan Protopopescu
- Primary user: Romania
- Number built: less than 25

History
- Introduction date: never
- First flight: 1922

Proto 1 was a training biplane designed by Major Ștefan Protopopescu in collaboration with Dumitru Baziliu and Gheorghe Ticău at Arsenalul Aeronautic in Bucharest in 1922. It was the first Romanian airplane to be built in a specialized enterprise.

The first experimental flights were carried out by its designer, Ștefan Protopopescu, who held the Romanian pilot licence No.1.

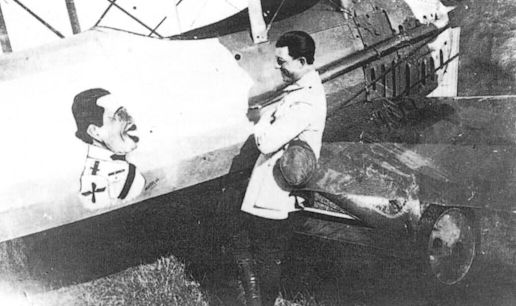
Major Protopopescu face-to-face with his own cartoon portrait painted on the all-white fuselage of the airplane.

== Production ==
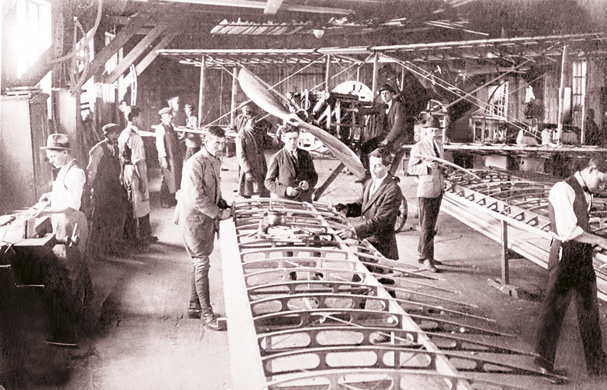
Proto-1 under construction at the Astra Factory

The Ministry of War ordered 25 aircraft on 10 January 1923 of this type from the Fabrica de avioane Astra. The Astra Factory changed the wings on its own initiative, which reduced the strength of the wings, and during an early test flight, one of the wings broke and the aircraft crashed into the Mureș river, killing the test pilot. After the accident, production of Proto 1 aircraft was halted and improvements were made to the design, after which Astra manufactured a new variant as the Proto 2.

== Specifications ==
Data from Romanian Aeronautical Constructions 1905-1974

General characteristics

- Crew: 2
- Length: 7 m (23 ft 0 in)
- Wingspan: 9.6 m (31 ft 6 in)
- Height: 2.9 m (9 ft 6 in)
- Wing area: 28.86 m^{2} (310.6 sq ft)
- Empty weight: 670 kg (1,477 lb)
- Gross weight: 1,080 kg (2,381 lb)
- Powerplant: 1 × Hispano-Suiza water-cooled V-8 engine, 130 kW (180 hp)
- Propellers: 2-bladed wooden propeller

Performance

- Maximum speed: 183 km/h (114 mph, 99 kn)
- Stall speed: 81 km/h (50 mph, 44 kn)
- Service ceiling: 6,000 m (20,000 ft)
- Time to altitude: 4,000 m (13,000 ft) in 29 minutes
