= Henri Mathias Berthelot =

French general (1861–1931)

Henri Berthelot
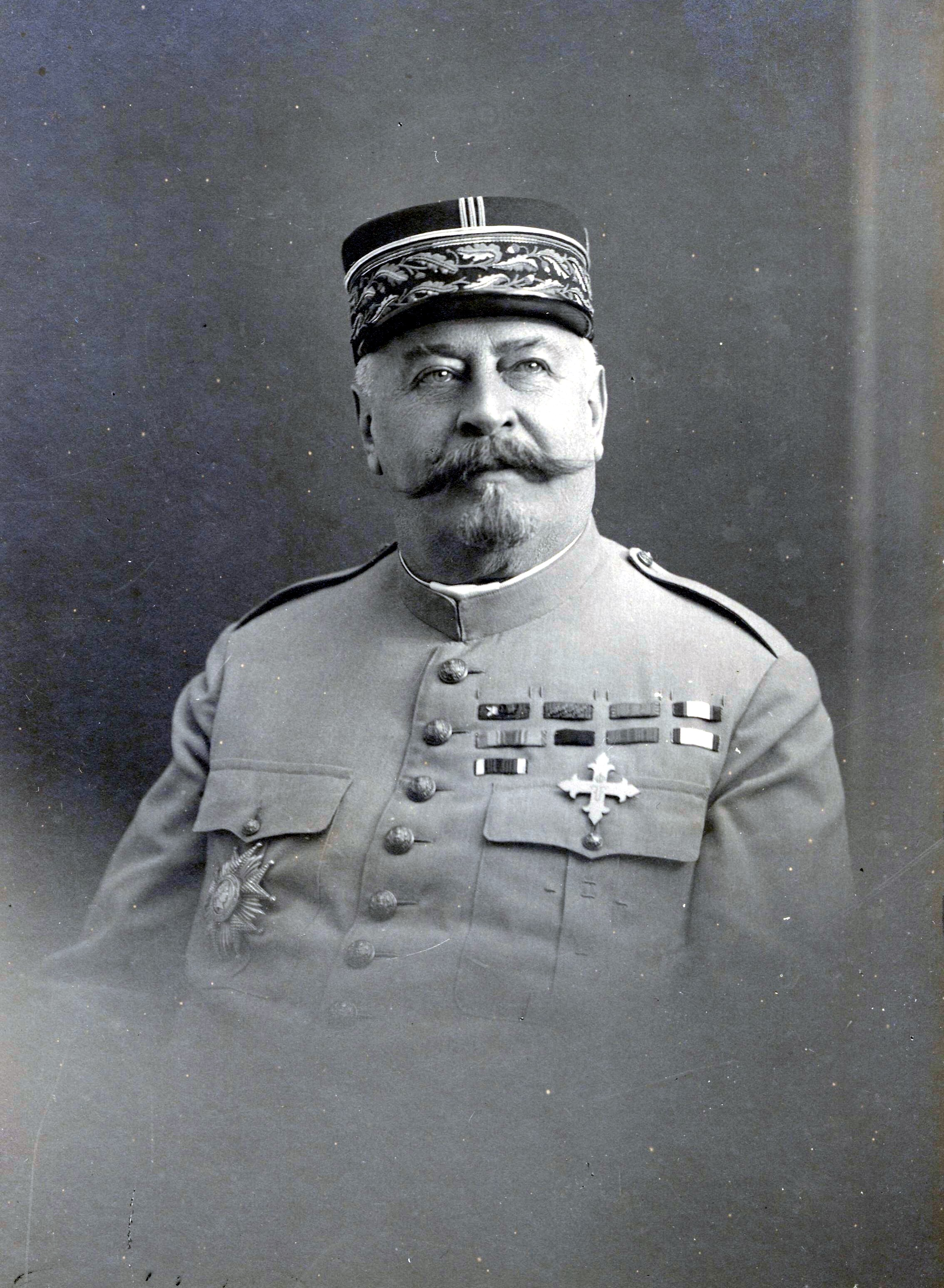
- Berthelot in 1920
- Born: 7 December 1861; Feurs, Loire, France
- Died: 29 January 1931 (aged 69); Paris, Seine, France
- Military career
- Allegiance: France
- Service years: 1883–1926
- Rank: Général de division holding higher command
- Commands: French Military Mission in Romania; Fifth Army (France)
- Conflicts: World War I; Hungarian–Romanian War
- Awards: See Awards and honors

Henri Mathias Berthelot (English: /bɛərtəˈloʊ/ ber-tə-LOH, French: [ɑ̃ʁi matjas bɛʁtəlo]; 7 December 1861 – 29 January 1931) was a French general during World War I. He held an important staff position under Joseph Joffre, the French commander-in-chief, at the First Battle of the Marne, before later commanding a corps in the front line. In 1917 he helped to rebuild the Romanian Army following its disastrous defeat the previous autumn, then in summer 1918 he commanded French Fifth Army at the Second Battle of the Marne, with some British and Italian troops under his command. In the final days of the war he again returned to Romania, helping fight the Hungarians during the Hungarian–Romanian War and then briefly commanded French intervention forces in southern Russia in the Russian Civil War, fighting the Bolsheviks in Bessarabia (1918).

Appointed a member of the Conseil supérieur de la guerre, he was among the supporters of the decision to build the Maginot Line.

== Biography ==
=== Early life ===
In 1883, after graduating from the Saint-Cyr military academy, Berthelot saw service in Algeria, Tonkin and Annam.

In 1907, he was assigned to the French General Staff. During this period Berthelot worked together with General Joseph Joffre on the French war plan called Plan XVII.

=== First World War ===
==== Staff Officer at the Marne ====
At the outbreak of war in 1914 he was Joffre’s First Sub Chief of Staff (under Major-General (a French term - not a rank but equivalent to the English language title "chief of staff") Emile Belin). Berthelot was in charge of the Second (Intelligence) and Third (Operations) Bureaux; First Bureau (Personnel & Transport of Materiel) and the Direction de l’Arriere (lines of communication) reported to the Second Sub Chief of Staff (General Deprez, replaced in mid-August by Colonel Maurice Pellé, former military attache in Berlin).

The British Commander-in-Chief Sir John French visited GQG on 16 August as British troops were marching towards Belgium, and was impressed by Berthelot’s calm and confidence. Tuchman wrote that Berthelot was “quick and clever, (and) like his British opposite number General Wilson, was an inveterate optimist. He weighed over 230 pounds”. Berthelot discarded his uniform jacket to work in shirt and slippers in the August heat. Like Joffre, Berthelot underestimated German strength. He thought that a German thrust into Belgium would play into French hands by weakening their centre in the Ardennes, where Joffre planned to attack, and even then thought reports of German strength in Belgium greatly exaggerated (20 August).

Berthelot noted British keenness to retreat in his diary (26 and 28 August 1914, after the Battle of Le Cateau), at the very moment the British were bemoaning the French lack of support. Although Berthelot advised waiting a little longer before launching the counterattack which became the First Battle of the Marne, Joseph Gallieni (Military governor of Paris) forced the issue on 4 September by ordering Sixth Army to move into position that day, so that evening orders were sent out for an attack on 6 September. Berthelot complained that British aircraft had been better than French aircraft and cavalry at delivering intelligence.

Like many Allied leaders, Berthelot believed after the victory at the Marne that the war was as good as won. He told Wilson (13 September) that the Allies would be in Elsenborn on the German-Belgian frontier in three weeks (Wilson thought four).

==== Division and Corps Commander ====
In November 1914, Berthelot was given the command of the reserve forces at Soissons, then later the command of the 53rd Division.

Early in 1915 Berthelot was serving in Maunoury’s Sixth Army, which was holding the front from Soissons to north of Compiegne, with Second Army on its left and Sarrail’s Fifth on right. All these armies fired diversionary barrages to distract German attention prior to the offensives in the Argonne, Lorraine and the Vosges. Sixth Army also launched a diversionary offensive north of Soissons and the Aisne, solid defensive ground where the Germans had halted their retreat in September 1914. A French attack under Berthelot captured Hill 132 west of Crouy after a battle between 8 and 11 January 1915, but by 14 January German counterattacks had regained all the lost ground and pushed the French further back from where they had started. 5,200 French prisoners were lost in exchange for 5,529 German casualties; the French had 12,411 killed, wounded and missing, 40% of the effectives which had been committed. This German success so close to Paris prompted the first stirrings of political criticism of the Generals’ conduct of the war. War Minister Millerand rebuked Joffre, who rebuked Maunoury, who in turn passed the blame on to Berthelot who was relieved of command along with two division commanders. There was an angry debate in the French Parliament, just reconvened (12 January) after its return from Bordeaux.

Berthelot later commanded XXXII Corps at the Battle of Verdun but his corps was pulled out of the line for rest in mid June 1916. He was to be redeployed to the Battle of the Somme, but was instead called to GQG on 20 September for his mission to Romania.

==== Romania ====
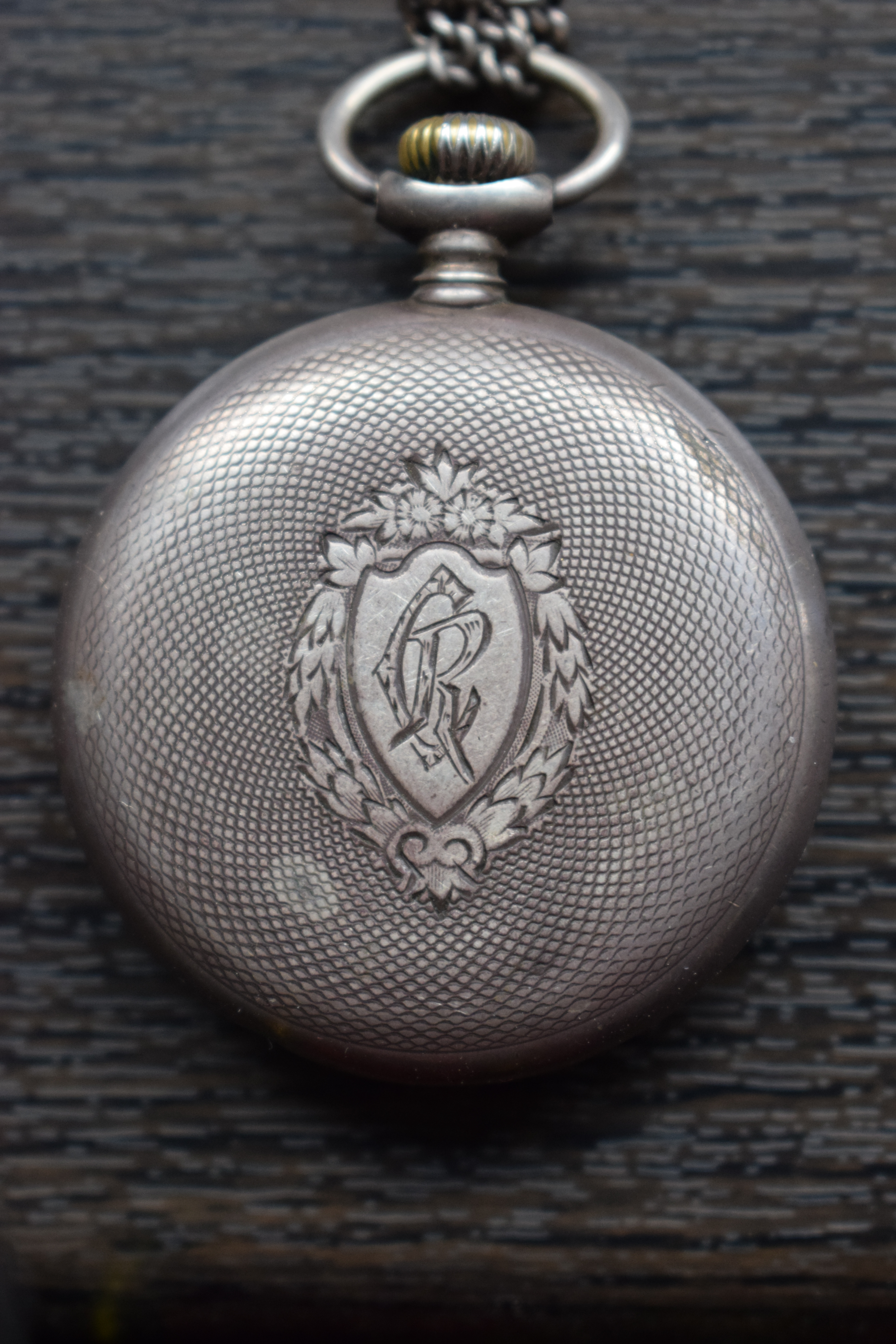
The silver-made Omega pocket watch presented by General Berthelot to Father Constantin I. Roșescu

Romania entered the war on the side of the Allies in August 1916. Joffre’s first choice to head the French military mission was General de Langle de Cary, but the suggestion was rejected by the French Minister there, Charles de Saint-Aulaire. Instead, Berthelot was appointed, arriving at Iași on 15 October and formally taking up his position the next day. Central Powers forces under General von Falkenhayn had already broken through the Transylvanian passes on 11 November, and swiftly conquered Wallachia and Dobruja.

Just as France had reconstituted the Serbian Army (now based at Salonika) after her conquest in the winter of 1915-16, between January and June 1917 Berthelot supervised the reorganisation and retraining of the Romanian Army. The military mission was built up to almost 400 officers and 1,000 men. 74 75mm guns were sent (with another 102 "under consideration") and 120 old 120L heavy guns, but Britain was asked to supply howitzers. On the way home from his visit to Petrograd in early 1917, shortly before the Fall of the Tsar, General de Castelnau stopped off for talks with Berthelot, and was told that the Romanian army could not be ready before 15 May. In August 1917 Foch sent General Albert Niessel (a Russian speaker and formerly commander of IX Corps), on a mission to Russia (by then a republic under the Provisional Government) in the hope of repeating Berthelot’s success there.

By summer 1917 Romania had reconstituted ten fully equipped divisions and had five more needing only artillery. Berthelot lobbied successfully for more munitions and 100 medics to defeat the spread of typhus. The results of the reorganisation and resupply of the Romanian troops were seen in August 1917, when Alexandru Averescu's army broke the front at Mărăști. The Central Powers' major counter-offensive under Mackensen, aiming to occupy the rest of Romania (Moldavia) and the port of Odessa, was stopped at Mărășești and Oituz. US Army Chief of Staff General Hugh Scott praised Berthelot as “a brilliant general”

However, when the Bolsheviks took Russia out of the war, Romania, left surrounded by the Central Powers, had little choice but to sign an armistice on 9 December 1917, followed by a peace treaty on 7 May 1918. The French military mission had to leave the country. At Berthelot's suggestion, Britain and France issued a statement that Romania had fought hard and had been overcome by circumstances beyond her control and that the imposed peace treaty would be disregarded by the Allies.

==== Fifth Army on the Western Front ====
In June 1918 Berthelot was sent on a mission to the USA, then on 5 July he was appointed commander of the Fifth Army. He replaced Buat, who had briefly succeeded Micheler but who had to replace Anthoine (thought “too pessimistic” after the near catastrophe of the Third Battle of the Aisne) as Chief of the General Staff at GQG).

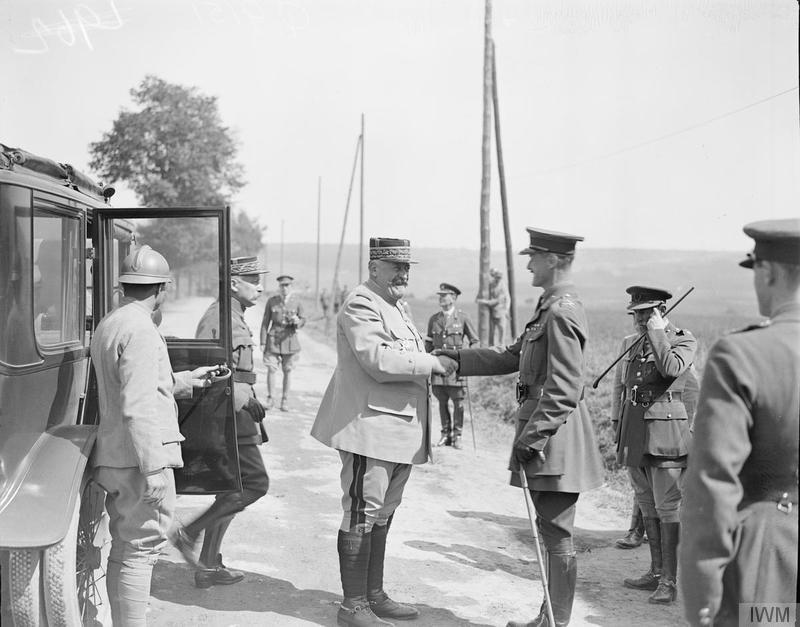
General Henri Berthelot, commanding the French Fifth Army, shaking hands with Lieutenant-General Sir Alexander Godley, GOC the British XXII Corps on its departure from the French front after the Battle of Tardenois, near Epernay, 1 August 1918.

On 16 July Petain (French Commander-in-Chief) reinforced Berthelot's army with two more divisions. Fifth Army attacked on 18 July on the right flank of the Marne salient, between Dormans and Prunay.

On 20 July Berthelot renewed the offensive quicker than had been planned by putting the British XXII Corps straight into the line, through Albricci's tired Italian II Corps, rather than effecting a standard relief. The British were ordered to attack up the Ardre Valley in the direction of Fismes where the Ardre runs into the Vesle. Godley, the British commander, was angry at being “hustled in, in a great hurry”, without artillery, but later conceded that Berthelot's decision had been correct “in the circumstances” and had been “justified by the event”. Berthelot praised the bravery of the British XXII Corps (as did Fayolle, commander of Army Group North); privately he thought less well of the British, writing “a certain number of hours’ work, then a rest, and, if it gets too hot, you move further back!”

==== Romania again ====
Berthelot was recalled to Paris after Louis Franchet d'Espèrey’s victory on the Salonika front at the end of September 1918, which put Bulgaria out of the war. The order reached him on 1 October 1918 to take command of a new Army of the Danube, drawing supply from Salonika but (to Franchet d'Esperey's irritation) reporting directly to Paris, to advance through Bulgaria and draw Romania back into the war. Berthelot hoped to achieve spectacular success against Austria-Hungary but she dropped out of the war just before this could happen. However, he persuaded Romania to rejoin the Entente just in time (10 November, a day before its end in Western Europe).

He advanced on Bucharest and entered Giurgiu, where streets were named after him and the two French soldiers who died crossing the Danube, on 15 November. He helped fight the Hungarians during the Hungarian–Romanian War and the Russian Bolsheviks in Bessarabia (1918).

On 11 November 1919, during the victory parade of the Allied forces in Paris, General Berthelot told General Foch at the sight of the Romanian detachment:

Foch, saluez! C'est la famille. ("Foch, salute! It's [our] family.")

==== Aftermath ====
After the armistice Berthelot was sent with a French division to southern Russia. The French presence was withdrawn from Odessa in the spring of 1919. Berthelot's return to France was enlivened by a revolt on board several ships.

=== After the War ===
From 1919 to 1922, Berthelot served as military governor of Metz, and from 1923 to 1926, as military governor of Strasbourg.

From 1920 to 1926, Berthelot was a member of the Conseil Général de Guerre (Supreme War Council), and was involved in the decision to build the Maginot Line.

He died in 1931 and was buried in Nervieux (Department of Loire).

== Awards and honors ==
=== France ===
- Grand cross of the Légion d'honneur
- Officier d'Académie
- Commander of the Order of Agricultural Merit
- Knight of the Order of the Dragon of Annam
- Médaille militaire
- Croix de guerre 1914-1918 with tree palms
- 1914–1918 Inter-Allied Victory medal
- 1914–1918 Commemorative war medal
- Tonkin Expedition commemorative medal

=== Foreign ===
- Kingdom of Romania:
  - Order of Michael the Brave, 1st class
  - Grand Cross of the Order of the Star of Romania
  - Officer of the Order of the Crown of Romania
  - Grand Cross of the Order of Ferdinand I
  - Honorary citizen of Romania
  - Honorary member of the Romanian Academy
- Russian Empire:
  - Order of St. George
  - Order of Saint Anna
  - Order of Saint Stanislaus
- Kingdom of Italy:
  - Grand Officer of the Order of Saints Maurice and Lazarus
  - Officer of the Order of the Crown of Italy
- Japan:
  - Order of the Rising Sun, 1st class
- Morocco:
  - Grand Cordon of the Order of Ouissam Alaouite
- Kingdom of Serbia:
  - Grand Cross of the Order of the White Eagle
- United Kingdom:
  - Knight Commander of the Order of St Michael and St George
- United States:
  - Army Distinguished Service Medal

== Berthelot's legacy in Romania ==
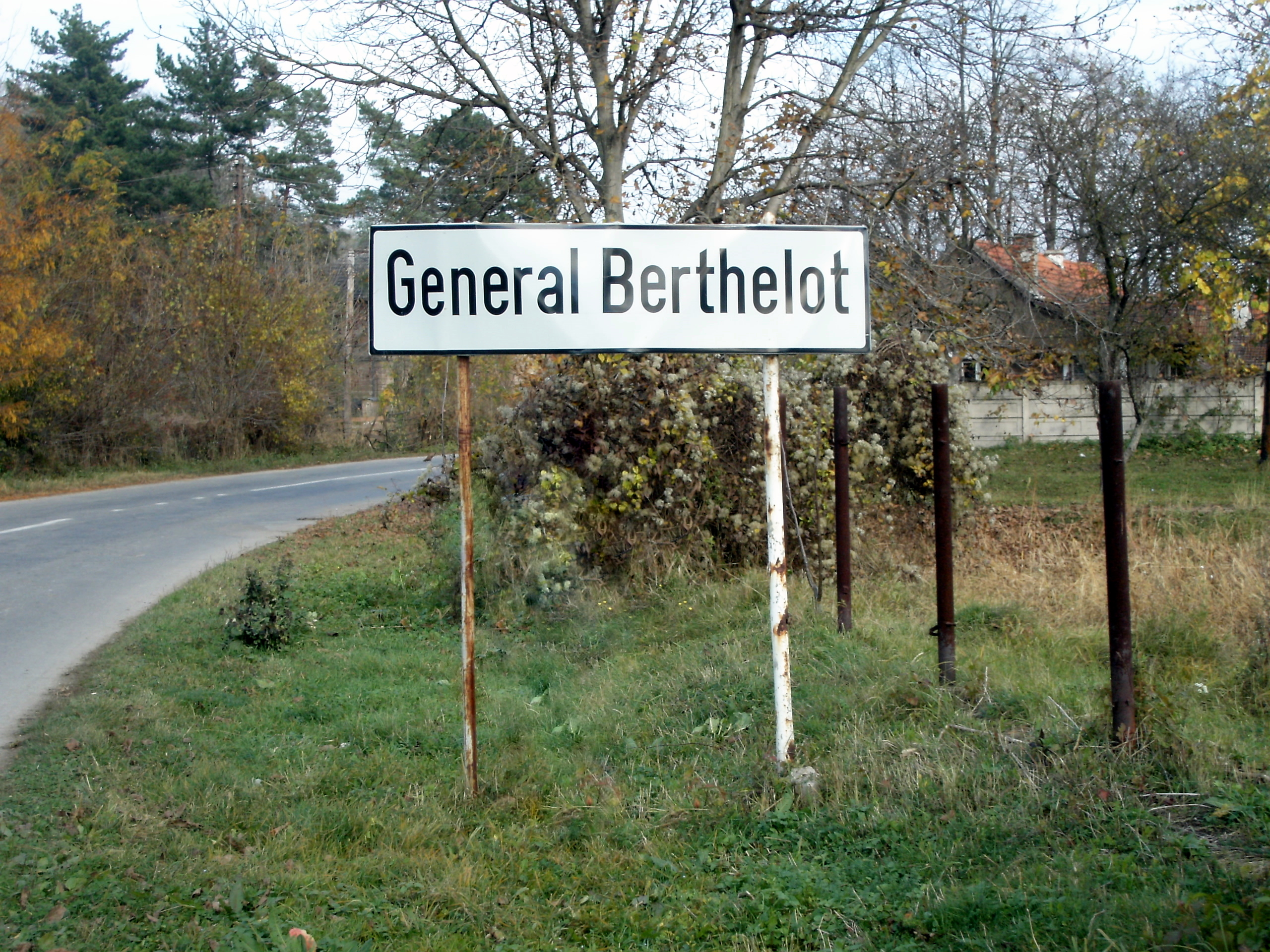
General Berthelot's village roadsign in Romania

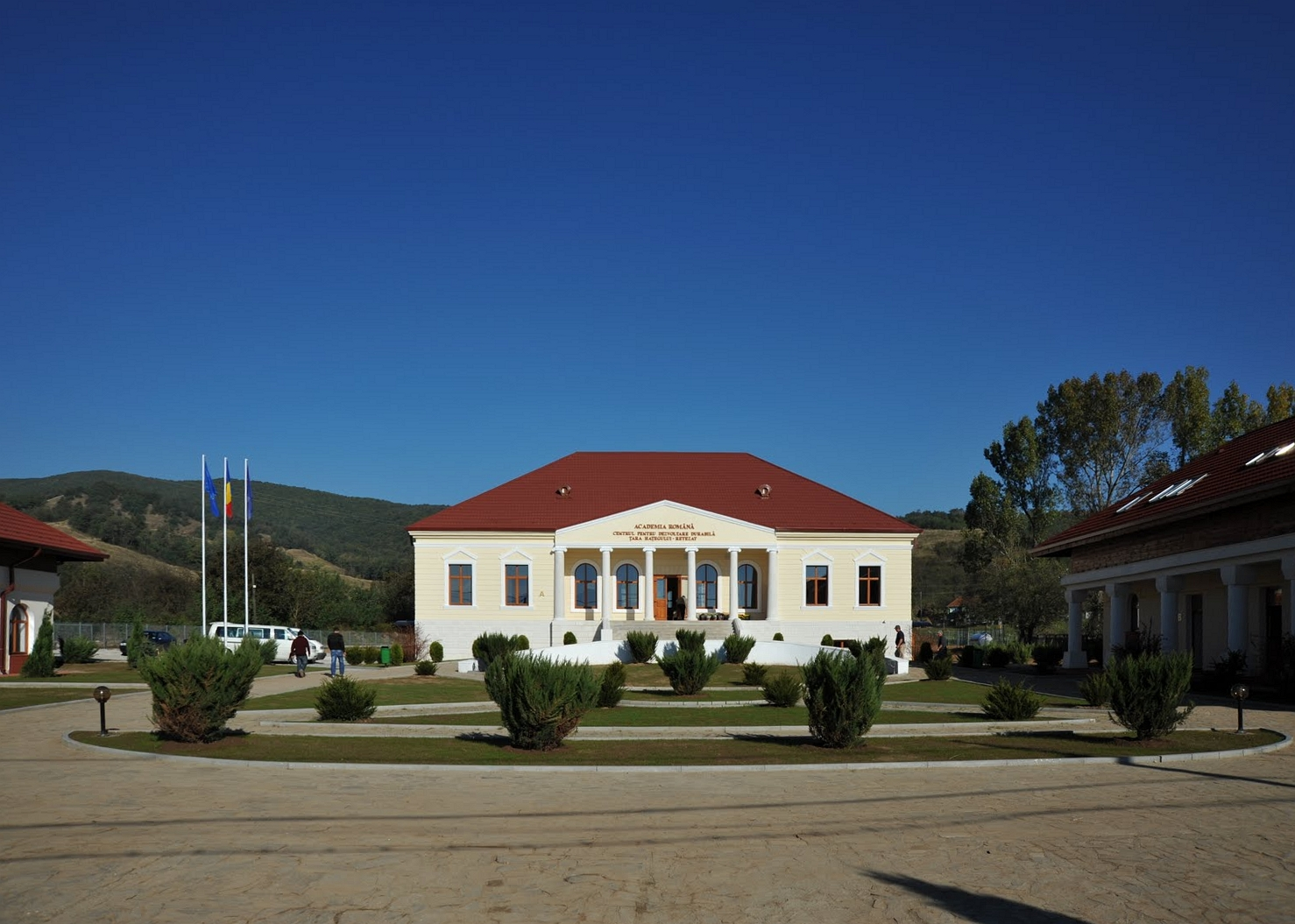
General Berthelot's restored manor house

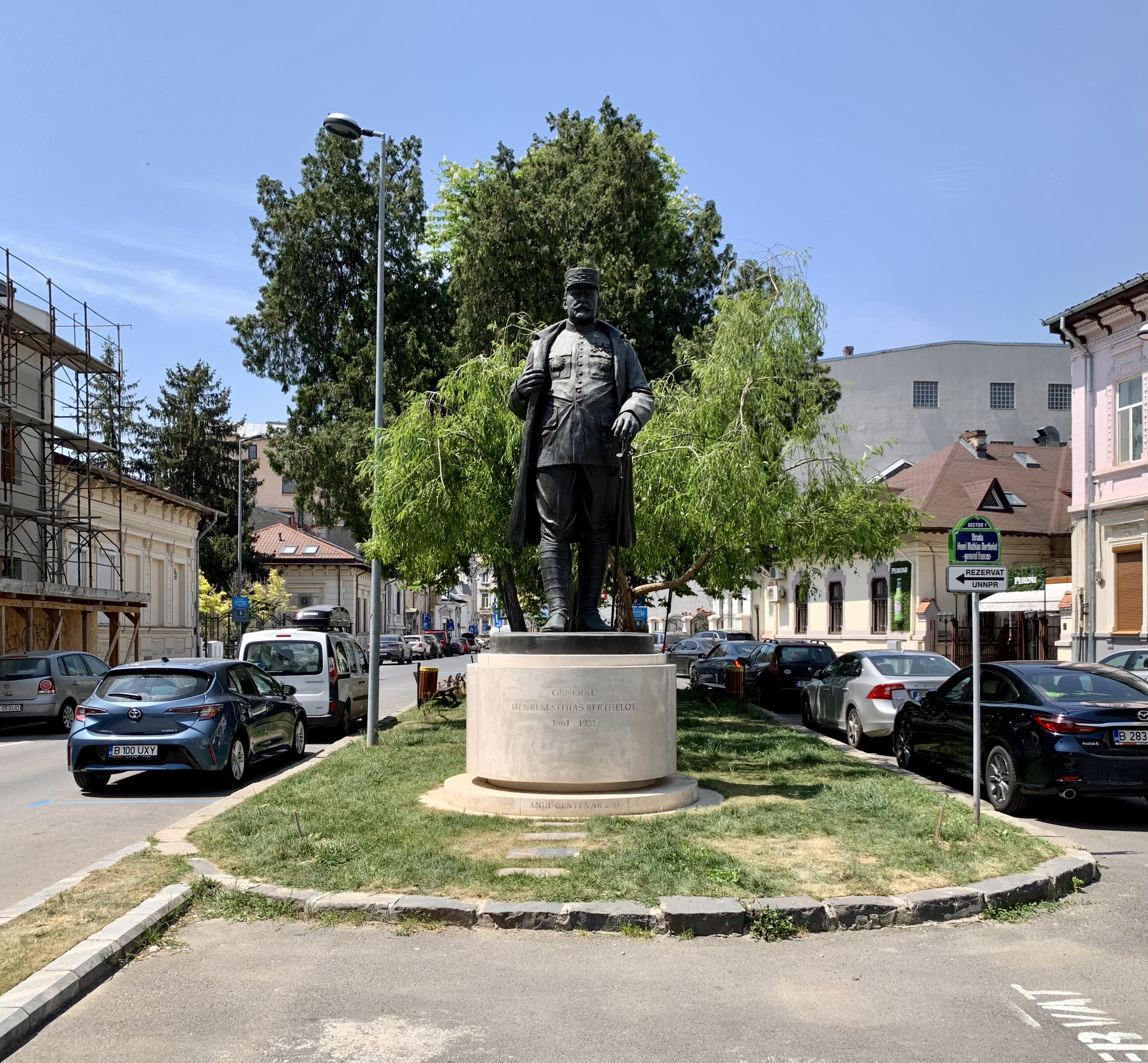
Statue of General Berthelot in Bucharest

Grateful for the French army's contribution to the liberation of Romania, and in particular, Berthelot's role during the World War I Romanian campaign, the Romanian Parliament awarded him honorary citizenship of Romania and King Ferdinand rewarded the general with lands located in the Transylvanian village of Fărcădin, confiscated from the Nopcsa family. The property included a manor house, some arable land, an orchard and a forest.

In 1923, the local council decided to rename Fărcădin to "General Berthelot". In 1926, Berthelot was elected an honorary member of the Romanian Academy. In his will he left all his properties in Fărcădin to the Romanian Academy.

During the communist dictatorship, the castle was sacked and eventually turned into a silo. In 1965 the village's name was changed to "Unirea" (Union). In 2001, after Ceaușescu's downfall, a local referendum approved the renaming of the village and the commune back to "General Berthelot". Several schools, streets and boulevards bear his name in Romania.

On 17 June 2024, the French Army camp located in Cincu hosting the deployment on Mission Aigle received the name "Camp Général Berthelot" in honor of General Berthelot. Initially the camp was named "Cherry Hill".

== Bibliography ==
- Greenhalgh, Elizabeth (2005). Victory Through Coalition. Cambridge University Press. ISBN 978-0-521-09629-4.
- Greenhalgh, Elizabeth (2014). The French Army and the First World War. Cambridge University Press. ISBN 978-1-107-60568-8.
- Terraine, John (2002). Mons: The Retreat to Victory. Ware: Wordsworth Military Library. ISBN 1840222433.
- Tuchman, Barbara (1962). The Guns of August. Random House.
