= General Health Questionnaire =

Psychometric screening tool

- Purpose: used to identify common psychiatric conditions

The General Health Questionnaire (GHQ) is a psychometric screening tool to identify common psychiatric conditions. It has been translated and validated in at least two languages in addition to English, Spanish and Persian. The latter used in different fields and generations. Also, using GHQ was beneficial in high-tech systems personnel.

The questionnaire comprises a number of questions, each with a four-point Likert scale for responses. There are versions with 12, 28, 30 and 60 questions. It is considered valid for use on adults and adolescents, but not children, and is available for purchase.

== Scoring ==
The questions in the GHQ have the response choices of Better/Healthier than Normal, Same as Usual, Worse/More than Usual, and Much Worse/More than Usual. These responses can be scored using the Likert or GHQ scale. Using the Likert scale the response choices are given the values 0, 1, 2, and 3 respectively. When a participant completes the questionnaire the values of their responses are then summed to give a final score between 0 and 180. Using the GHQ scale, the response choices are given values of 0, 0, 1, and 1 respectively. In this case, the final score can range from 0 to 60. Medical professionals establish score ranges that indicate the severity of any psychiatric issues. The questions can also be broken into sections that target specific psychiatric issues such as anxiety disorder, depression, and bipolar disorder. These sections can be scored individually as well, to determine the severity. The score ranges used to distinguish between different severities of psychiatric issues are established by each medical professional, so there is no widely accepted set range.

== History ==
The original study that proposed the GHQ was published in 1970 by David Goldberg and Dr. Blackwell. This study was originally completed to validate the General Health Questionnaire as a reliable determinant of psychiatric health in general practice. The GHQ was given to 3000 patients at a general medicine practice in London. After completing the questionnaire the patients were then evaluated by a general practitioner and psychiatrist. The practitioner and psychiatrist's diagnoses were rated 0 to 4 and the questionnaire scores were categorized A-H. The results of the GHQ were then compared to the general practitioner and psychiatrist's determinations and it was found that only 8.5% of patients were miscategorized. The high accuracy of the questionnaire proved that it was equivalent to a psychiatrist's or practitioner's diagnosis and could be used as a method of evaluating patients.

Diagnosis Categorization System
Practitioner/Psychiatrist Score	Definition
0	No psychiatric disturbance detected
1	Mild subclinical emotional disturbance detected
2	Clinically significant psychiatric illness-mild
3	Psychiatric illness-moderate
4	Psychiatric illness-marked

GHQ Score Categorization System
GHQ Score Category	Definition
A	Entirely physical complaints
B	Physical condition in a neurotic personality
C	Physical illness with associated psychiatric disturbance
D	Psychiatric illness with somatic symptoms
E	Unrelated physical and psychiatric illness
F	Entirely psychiatric illness
G	Miscellaneous, not ill, unclassifiable
H	Parents of sick children
