= General Headquarters (game) =

Board game

- Publishers: Mars International
- Publication: 2024
- Genres: Board game
- Players: 2
- Setup time: 1 minute
- Playing time: 30-60 minutes
- Chance: None
- Age range: 10+
- Skills: Strategy, tactics
- Website: https://www.playghq.com/

General Headquarters, also known as GHQ, is a two-person board game designed by Kurt Vonnegut in the 1950s and published by Mars International in 2024. Board-game designer Geoff Engelstein helped finalize the published version of the game.

== Gameplay ==
The game takes place between two players over a standard eight-by-eight board. Similar to chess, the goal is to capture one of the opponent's pieces, called the "Headquarters".

In addition to the Headquarters, there are two distinct piece types: Infantry and Artillery. Infantry pieces interact with the squares directly around them, and they capture opposing pieces when they occupy a majority of neighboring squares. Artillery pieces "bombard" distant squares, and capture when pieces are trapped or left on the squares they control. Within each piece type, there are variations in move speed, maneuverability, and range.

Each turn, players may take up to three "actions," where they can deploy, move, or rotate their pieces. Games take between thirty minutes and an hour.

Vonnegut, a veteran of World War II, hoped that the game would capture the intricacy of military strategy. In a letter to a potential publisher, he wrote that the game “is similar in mood to chess, and it is played on a standard checkerboard. It has enough dignity and interest, I think, to become the third popular checkerboard game.”

== Development ==
Vonnegut initially conceived of General Headquarters in the 1950s after the publication of his first book, Player Piano. The book sold poorly, and Vonnegut, searching for other kinds of income, tried unsuccessfully to publish the game. Though much of Vonnegut's work is staunchly anti-war, the game deals with military strategy and troop movement, and some of Vonnegut's letters to publishers suggested that GHQ could be used to train cadets at West Point. Several game publishers declined the game, and Vonnegut set it aside after his later books found more commercial success.

Board-game designer Geoff Engelstein rediscovered the game amid Vonnegut's papers, which included ideas, drawings, and several versions of the game rules.

Engelstein connected with Vonnegut's estate and received permission to help publish the game. The final version stays true to the original rules with small clarifications and adjustments.
