= Proto 2 (aircraft) =

Romanian training biplane

Proto-2
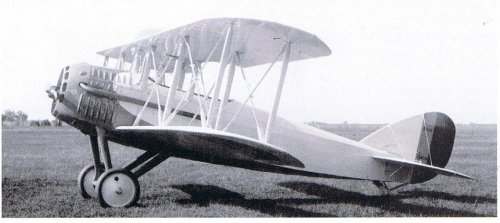
- Proto-2 aircraft

General information
- Type: Trainer aircraft
- Manufacturer: Fabrica de avioane Astra
- Designer: Ștefan Protopopescu improved at the Astra Factory
- Primary user: Romanian Air Force
- Number built: 25

History
- Introduction date: 1924
- First flight: 1924
- Retired: 1930

Proto 2 was a training biplane manufactured at the Fabrica de avioane Astra in Arad in 1924.

== Design and development ==
Following the accident of Ioan Sava, a new variant of the Proto 1 was created, called the Proto 2. The airplane kept the original design, but as a safety measure, the structure of the wings was strengthened by increasing the section of the spars and adding another pair of interplane struts.

== Service ==
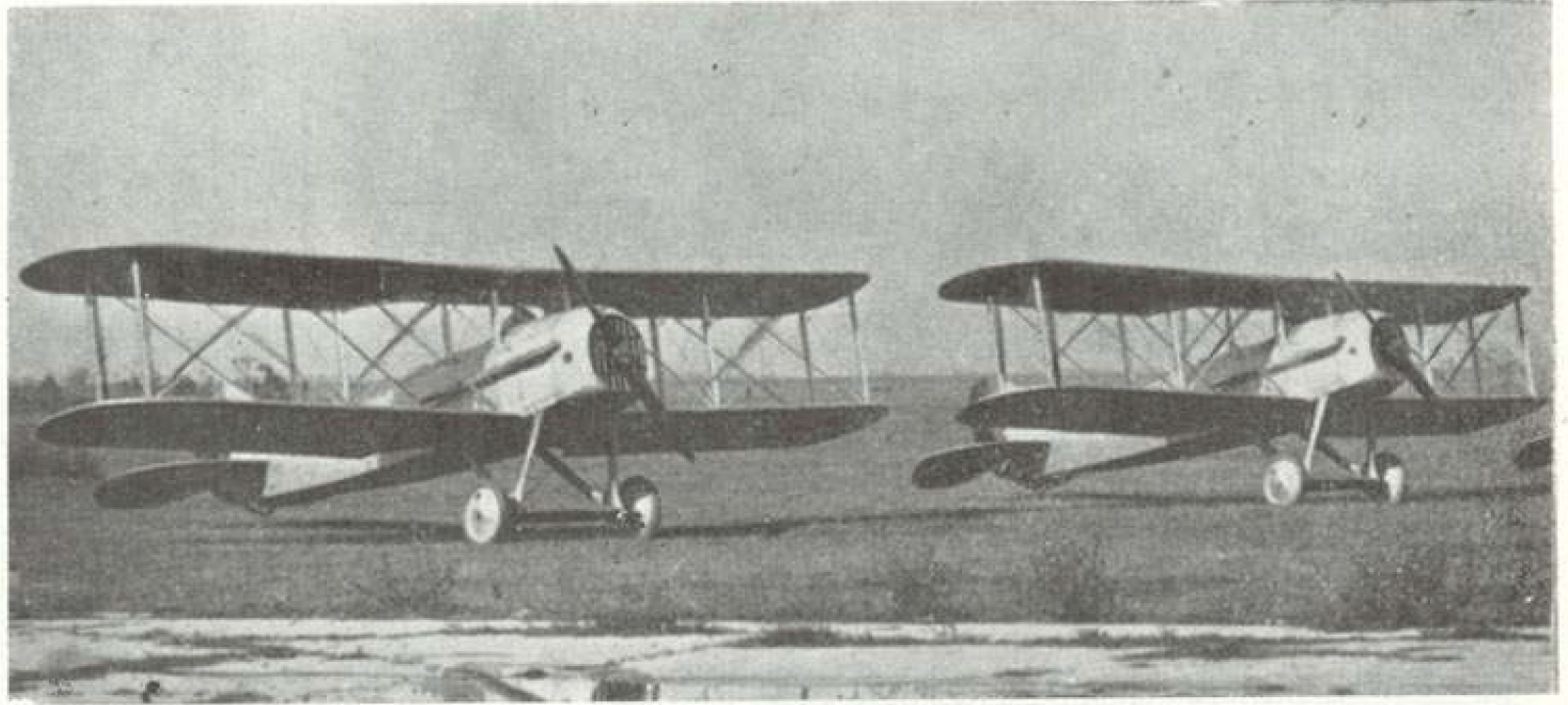
Two parked Proto-2 planes

After these improvements were made, the Astra Factory built 25 aircraft. The airplanes were then supplied to the Ministry of War, which assigned them to the Military Flying School of Tecuci.

== Specifications ==
Data from Romanian Aeronautical Constructions 1905-1974

General characteristics

- Crew: 2
- Length: 7 m (23 ft 0 in)
- Wingspan: 9.6 m (31 ft 6 in)
- Height: 2.9 m (9 ft 6 in)
- Wing area: 28.86 m^{2} (310.6 sq ft)
- Empty weight: 730 kg (1,609 lb)
- Gross weight: 1,140 kg (2,513 lb)
- Powerplant: 1 × Hispano-Suiza water-cooled V-8 engine, 130 kW (180 hp)
- Propellers: 2-bladed wooden propeller

Performance

- Maximum speed: 174 km/h (108 mph, 94 kn)
- Stall speed: 79 km/h (49 mph, 43 kn)
- Service ceiling: 5,000 m (16,000 ft)
- Time to altitude: 3,000 m (9,800 ft) in 22 minutes
