= French Military Mission to Romania (1916–1918) =

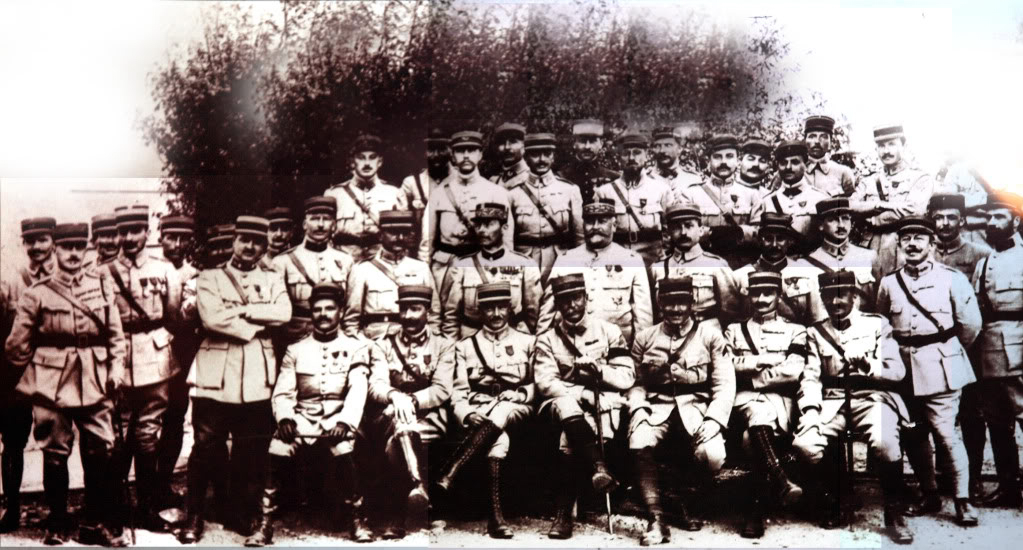
General Berthelot (in the middle) with other officers of the French Military Mission

The French Military Mission to Romania was a mission led by General Berthelot, and sent from France to help Romania during World War I. French officers, aviators and medical staff trained and supported the Romanian Army. As the Bolsheviks took power in Russia and began negotiations for ending hostilities, Romania signed an armistice in December 1917 and the military mission had to be sent back to France.

== Background ==
Romania entered the war on the side of the Allies in August 1916. General Joffre's first choice to head the French military mission was General de Langle de Cary, but the suggestion was rejected by the French Minister there, Charles de Saint Aulaire. Instead, Berthelot was appointed, arriving at Iași on 15 October and formally taking up his position the next day. Central Powers forces under General von Falkenhayn had already broken through the Transylvanian passes on 11 October, and swiftly conquered Wallachia and Dobruja.

== Activities ==
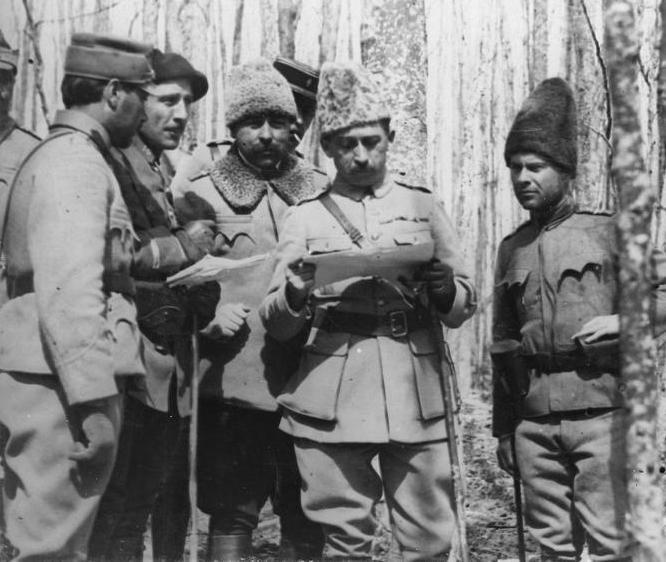
Colonel Victor Pétin (3rd from left) on the Romanian front in 1917

Just as France had reconstituted the Serbian Army (now based at Salonika) after her conquest in the winter of 1915-16, between January and June 1917 Berthelot supervised the reorganisation and retraining of the Romanian Army. The men travelled through Norway, Sweden and Russia by train to reach Romania. The military mission was built up to almost 400 officers and 1,000 men. 74 75mm guns were sent (with another 102 "under consideration") and 120 old 120L heavy guns, but Britain was asked to supply howitzers (28 BL 5-inch howitzer were received in 1917). Medical staff helped fight typhus and trained the Romanian staff to use modern techniques in both radiology and surgery.

To efficiently train their Romanian allies, the French mission personnel was integrated directly into the ranks Romanian army. Likewise, the aviation component of the mission was integrated into the Romanian Air Corps.

== Results ==
On the way home from his visit to Petrograd in early 1917, shortly before the Fall of the Tsar, General de Castelnau stopped off for talks with Berthelot, and was told that the Romanian army could not be ready before 15 May. In August 1917 Foch sent General Albert Niessel (a Russian speaker and formerly commander of IX Corps), on a mission to Russia (by then a republic under the Provisional Government) in the hope of repeating Berthelot's success there.

By summer 1917 Romania had reconstituted ten fully equipped divisions and had five more needing only artillery. Berthelot lobbied successfully for more munitions and 100 medics to defeat the spread of typhus. The results of the reorganisation and resupply of the Romanian troops were seen in August 1917, when Alexandru Averescu's army broke the front at Mărăști. The Central Powers' major counter-offensive under Mackensen, aiming to occupy the rest of Romania (Moldavia) and the port of Odessa, was stopped at Mărășești and Oituz. US Army Chief of Staff General Hugh Scott praised Berthelot as "a brilliant general".

== Aftermath ==
However, when the Bolsheviks began negotiations to take Russia out of the war which resulted in their ceasefire agreements, Romania, surrounded by the Central Powers, had to sign an armistice on 9 December 1917, followed by a peace treaty on 7 May 1918. The French military mission had to leave the country on 29 February 1918. At Berthelot's suggestion, Britain and France issued a statement that Romania had fought hard, and had been overcome by circumstances beyond her control and that the imposed peace treaty would be disregarded by the Allies.

== Homages ==
Berthelot is considered a hero in post-war Romania. The village of General Berthelot is renamed in his honor and the government granted him a house there.

== See also ==
- Mission Aigle

== Bibliography ==
- Avram, Valeriu; Armă, Alexandru (2018). Aeronautica română în Războiul de Întregire națională 1916-1919 (in Romanian). Editura Vremea. ISBN 978-973-645-853-8.
- Greenhalgh, Elizabeth (2014). The French Army and the First World War. Cambridge University Press. ISBN 978-1-107-60568-8.
