= List of World War I flying aces from Austria-Hungary =

Austria–Hungary: Cisleithania (Austrian Empire): 1. Bohemia, 2. Bukovina, 3. Carinthia, 4. Carniola, 5. Dalmatia, 6. Galicia and Lodomeria, 7. Küstenland, 8. Austria below the Enns, 9. Moravia, 10. Salzburg, 11. Silesia, 12. Styria, 13. Tyrol, 14. Austria above the Enns, 15. Vorarlberg; Transleithania (Kingdom of Hungary): 16. Hungary proper 17. Croatia-Slavonia; Austrian-Hungarian Condominium: 18. Bosnia and Herzegovina

This list of World War I flying aces from Austria-Hungary contains the names of aviators from the countries ruled by the Habsburg dynasty. Austria-Hungary was a constitutional union of the Austrian Empire (Cisleithania) and the Kingdom of Hungary (Transleithania) which existed from 1867 to 1918, when it collapsed as a result of defeat in World War I. Its territory contained a melange of nationalities. Although the aces of the K.u.k. Luftfahrtruppen owed their military allegiance to the Austro-Hungarian Empire as a whole, they came from various ethnic groups. Despite the Hungarian government's policy of Magyarization, many inhabitants of that kingdom clung to their ethnic identities. The breakup of the Austro-Hungarian Empire post World War I saw the formation of independent nations from some of these ethnic groups.

== Flying aces of the Austro-Hungarian Empire ==
Major background information for this list comes from O'Connor, pp. 272–332. As O'Connor also states on page 9: "Germanic name forms are used for the sake of uniformity and because German was the official language of the Austro-Hungarian Empire." This supplies the most common names of aces as Germanic, while non-German names are appended as aliases.

Listings are based on best available victory-by-victory listings. Every aircrew member significantly contributing to the defeat of an enemy aircraft could be credited with a full victory. All victories counted equally, whether the aviator scored them as a fighter pilot, a reconnaissance pilot, or an aerial observer/gunner.

For six to eight months in early 1918, the rules were tightened to allow only one verified victory per combat claim. This restriction was later revoked, and the former rule of shared victories reinstated, even retroactively.

Austro-Hungarian authorities did credit enemy aircraft that were forced to land as actual victories. This can be noted throughout the victory records of their aces.

Name	Victories	Birthplace	Nation	Notes
Godwin von Brumowski	35	Wadowice	Kingdom of Galicia and Lodomeria (now Poland)	Leading Austro-Hungarian ace of the war and leading Austro-Hungarian ace from present-day Poland.
Julius Arigi	32	Děčín	Kingdom of Bohemia (now Czech Republic)	Leading ace from present-day Czech Republic.
Benno Fiala von Fernbrugg	28	Vienna	Archduchy of Austria below the Enns (now Republic of Austria)	Leading ace from present-day Austria.
Frank Linke-Crawford	27	Kraków	Kingdom of Galicia and Lodomeria (now Poland)	
József Kiss alias József Kiss de Elemér et Ittebe	19	Pozsony	Kingdom of Hungary (now Slovak Republic)	Leading ace from present-day Slovakia.
Franz Gräser alias Ferenc Gräser	18	Nyírmada	Kingdom of Hungary (now Hungary)	
Eugen Bönsch	16	Velká Úpa	Kingdom of Bohemia (now Czech Republic)	
Stefan Fejes alias István Fejes	16	Győr	Kingdom of Hungary (now Hungary)	
Ernst Strohschneider	15	Ústí nad Labem	Kingdom of Bohemia (now Czech Republic)	
Adolf Heyrowsky	12	Murau	Duchy of Styria (now Republic of Austria)	
Kurt Gruber	11	Linz	Archduchy of Austria above the Enns (now Republic of Austria)	
Franz Rudorfer	11	Vienna	Archduchy of Austria below the Enns (now Republic of Austria)	
Friedrich Navratil alias Miroslav Navratil	10	Sarajevo	Province of Bosnia and Herzegovina (now Bosnia and Herzegovina)	Sole ace from Bosnia and Herzegovina. Ethnic Croat
Raoul Stojsavljevic	10	Innsbruck	Duchy of Tyrol (now Republic of Austria)	
Gottfried Freiherr von Banfield	9	Castelnuovo (now Herceg Novi)	Kingdom of Croatia (now Montenegro)	The only ace born in present-day Montenegro.
Otto Jindra	9	Chlumec nad Cidlinou	Kingdom of Bohemia (now Czech Republic)	
Georg Kenzian alias Georg Kenzian von Kenzianshausen	9	Linz	Archduchy of Austria above the Enns (now Republic of Austria)	
Karl Kaszala alias Károly Kaszala	8	Nyitra	Kingdom of Hungary (now Slovak Republic)	
Heinrich Kostrba	8	Prague	Kingdom of Bohemia (now Czech Republic)	
Alexander Tahy alias Sándor Tahy	8	Nyíregyháza	Kingdom of Hungary (now Hungary)	
Ferdinand Udvardy (with diacritics Ferdinánd Udvardy)	8 (Note: The Aerodrome website at (https://www.theaerodrome.com/aces/austrhun/udvardy.php) credits him with nine victories.)	Pozsony (now Bratislava)	Kingdom of Hungary (now Slovak Republic)	
Josef Friedrich	7	Cvikov	Kingdom of Bohemia (now Czech Republic)	
Ludwig Hautzmayer	7	Fürstenfeld	Duchy of Styria (now Republic of Austria)	
Otto Jäger	7	Asch	Kingdom of Bohemia (now Czech Republic)	
Josef von Maier alias József von Maier	7	Pozsony (now Bratislava)	Kingdom of Hungary (now Slovak Republic)	
Johann Risztics alias János Risztics	7	Budapest	Kingdom of Hungary (now Hungary)	
Andreas Dombrowski	6	Mährisch-Ostrau	Duchy of Moravia (now Czech Republic)	
Johann Frint alias János Frint	6	Budapest	Kingdom of Hungary (now Hungary)	
Alexander Kasza alias Sándor Kasza	6	Bácskosuthfalva	Kingdom of Hungary (now Hungary)	
Karl Nikitsch	6	Gross-Czakowitz (now Čakovice district of Prague)	Kingdom of Bohemia (now Czech Republic)	
Franz Peter	6	Vienna	Archduchy of Austria below the Enns (now Republic of Austria)	
Josef Pürer	6	Brno or Schönau	Duchy of Moravia (now Czech Republic), ethnic Austrian	
Roman Schmidt	6	Varaždin	Kingdom of Croatia (now Croatia)	Only ace from present-day Croatia
Rudolf Weber	6	Sighișoara	Principality of Transylvania (now Romania)	
Julius Busa alias Gyula Busa	5	Budapest	Kingdom of Hungary (now Hungary)	
Friedrich Hefty (alias Hefty Frigyes)	5	Pozsony (now Bratislava)	Kingdom of Hungary (now Slovak Republic)	
Julius Kowalczik	5	Ostrava	Duchy of Upper and Lower Silesia (now Poland)	
Franz Lahner	5	Bad Goisern	Archduchy of Austria above the Enns (now Republic of Austria)	
Friedrich Lang	5		Austria	
Johann Lasi	5	Katy (now Kać)	Kingdom of Hungary (now Serbia),	Ethnic Croat, only ace of the Luftfahrtruppen born in present-day Serbia.
Béla Macourek	5	Pozsony (now Bratislava)	Kingdom of Hungary (now Slovak Republic)	
Kurt Nachod	5	Brno	Duchy of Moravia (now Czech Republic)	
Augustin Novák	5	Botenwald	Duchy of Moravia (now Czech Republic)	
Karl Patzelt	5	Craiova, Romania	Kingdom of Bohemia (now Czech Republic)	
Alois Rodlauer	5	Urfahr-Umgebung	Archduchy of Austria above the Enns (now Republic of Austria)	
Rudolf Szepessy-Sokoll (alias Rudolf Szepessy-Sokol Freiherr von Negyes et Reno)	5		Kingdom of Hungary	
Karl Teichmann	5	Hrabišín	Duchy of Moravia (now Czech Republic)	
Karl Urban	5	Graz	Duchy of Styria (now Republic of Austria)	
Franz Wognar	5	Nagyszombat (now Trnava)	Kingdom of Hungary (now Slovak Republic)	

== See also ==
- List of World War I flying aces from Austria
- List of World War I flying aces from Croatia
- List of World War I Czech flying aces
- List of World War I flying aces from Hungary
- List of World War I aces from Poland
- List of World War I flying aces from Serbia
- List of World War I Slovak flying aces

== Sources ==
- Albrich, Thomas; Hagen, Nikolaus, eds. (2019). Österreich-Ungarns Fliegerasse im Ersten Weltkrieg 1914–1918 (in German). Innsbruck: Universitätsverlag Wagner. ISBN 978-3-7030-0997-6.
- Franks, Norman; Guest, Russell; Alegi, Gregory (1997). Above the War Fronts: The British Two-seater Bomber Pilot and Observer Aces, the British Two-seater Fighter Observer Aces, and the Belgian, Italian, Austro-Hungarian and Russian Fighter Aces, 1914–1918. Grub Street. ISBN 978-1-898697-56-5.
- O'Connor, Martin (1986). Air Aces of the Austro-Hungarian Empire, 1914-1918 (1994 reprint by Flying Machines Press ed.). Paladin Press. ISBN 978-1-891268-06-9.
