= List of World War I Czech flying aces =

Catalog of WW1 Czech aces

Austro-Hungary's Luftfahrtruppen contained many aviators of Czech origin, i.e. ethnic Czechs and men born in the territory of the modern-day Czech Republic. The flying aces among them are listed below. At least one flier in the German Luftstreitkräfte was also of Czech origin.

Name	Victories	Notes
Julius Arigi	32 victories	Austro-Hungarian Empire's second scoring ace served in World War II in the German Luftwaffe.
Paul Billik	31 victories	Served in the German Luftstreitkräfte.
Eugen Bönsch	16 victories	Served in the Luftwaffe during World War II.
Ernst Strohschneider	15 victories	
Otto Jindra	9 victories	Postwar commander of the Czech Air Force.
Heinrich Kostrba	8 victories	First commanding officer of the Czechoslovak Flying Corps.
Josef Friedrich	7 victories	
Otto Jäger	7 victories	
Andreas Dombrowski	6 victories	
Kurt Nachod	5 victories	
Karl Nikitsch	6 victories	
Karl Patzelt	5 victories	
Karl Teichmann	5 victories	

== See also ==
- List of World War I flying aces from Austria-Hungary
- List of World War I flying aces
- List of World War I flying aces from Austria
- List of World War I flying aces from Hungary
- List of World War I Slovak flying aces
