= History of the Croatian Air Force =

This article details the history of the Croatian Air Force. The Republic of Croatia is a unitary democratic parliamentary republic in Europe at the crossroads of Central Europe, the Mediterranean, and the Southeast Europe. Its capital and largest city is Zagreb. The modern Croatian Air Force (Croatian: Hrvatsko Ratno Zrakoplovstvo) was established on 12 December 1991, during the Croatian War of Independence. In 2010, a commemorative air show was held, a book and a commemorative coin were issued to mark 100 years of aviation in Croatia.

== Early aviation history ==
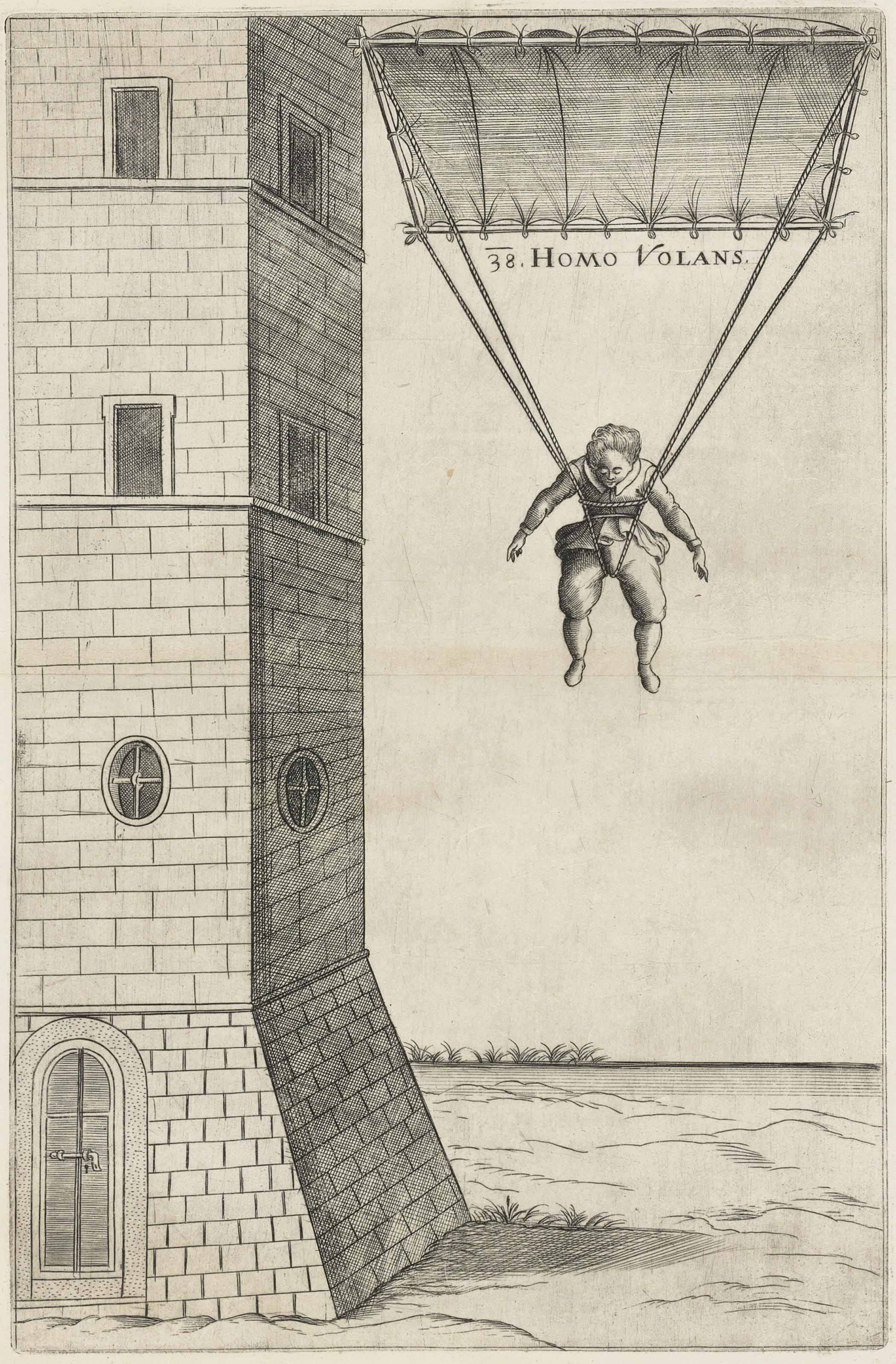
Illustration of Faust Vrančić's parachute.

Some of the first pioneers in aviation were from Croatia or of Croatian descent. Faust Vrančić designed and tested the parachute in 1617. First Croat flying in a balloon was Krsto Mazarović over Zagreb in 1789. David Schwarz created the first flyable Rigid airship. Peter Salcher was the creator of the first wind tunnel. Slavoljub Eduard Penkala constructed the first Croatian two-seat aeroplane in 1909 which Dragutin Novak used for his first flight. Katarina Matanović-Kulenović was the first female Croatian pilot. Juan Bielovucic Cavalie was the first pilot of Croatian origin and the founder of aviation in Peru, he enrolled in Voisin brothers pilot school in 1908. Guido Prodam was the first aviator that flew over the Adriatic Sea in 1911. Other notable aircraft constructors were Rudolf Fizir, Ivan Sarić, brothers Josip and Edvard Rusjan, Mihailo Merćep, Stanko Obad and Robert Ludvigovich Bartini.

== World War I ==
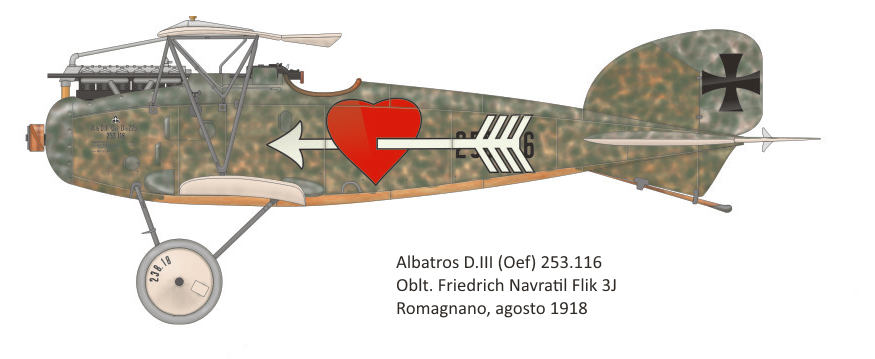
The Albatros D.III flown by Miroslav Navratil in August 1918.

During World War I, Croatia was part of the Austro-Hungarian Empire. Croatian pilots flew in Austro-Hungarian Imperial and Royal Aviation Troops. Johann Lasi was the first Croatian ace, scoring five victories in only 30 minutes of combat. Miroslav Navratil and Raoul Stojsavljevic were some of the most successful aces in the war, both scoring 10 victories.

Viktor Klobučar was the first commander of the Austro-Hungarian naval aviation. He established a naval air force and a network of seaplane bases from Istria to the Bay of Kotor. Major Emil Uzelac was a Croatian military commander who was a leading figure in the air forces of the Austro-Hungarian Empire, and later in the Kingdom of Yugoslavia and the Independent State of Croatia. After World War I the Yugoslav Royal Air Force was formed upon the creation of the Kingdom of Serbs, Croats and Slovenes (renamed to Kingdom of Yugoslavia in 1929) in 1918 and existed until Yugoslavia's surrender to Axis powers in 1941 after the Invasion of Yugoslavia during World War II.

== World War II ==
By the outbreak of the Second World War, Kingdom of Yugoslavia had a substantial air force. In 1940, Britain attempted to bring Yugoslavia to the Allied side by supplying military aid to the Royal Yugoslav Air Force, including new Hawker Hurricane fighter aircraft. However Nazi Germany sold a large number of Messerschmitt Bf 109 fighters to Yugoslavia and in early 1941, and German dismay towards a Balkans campaign convinced Yugoslavia to join the Axis forces. Following the coup d'état on March 25, 1941 Axis powers invaded Yugoslavia.

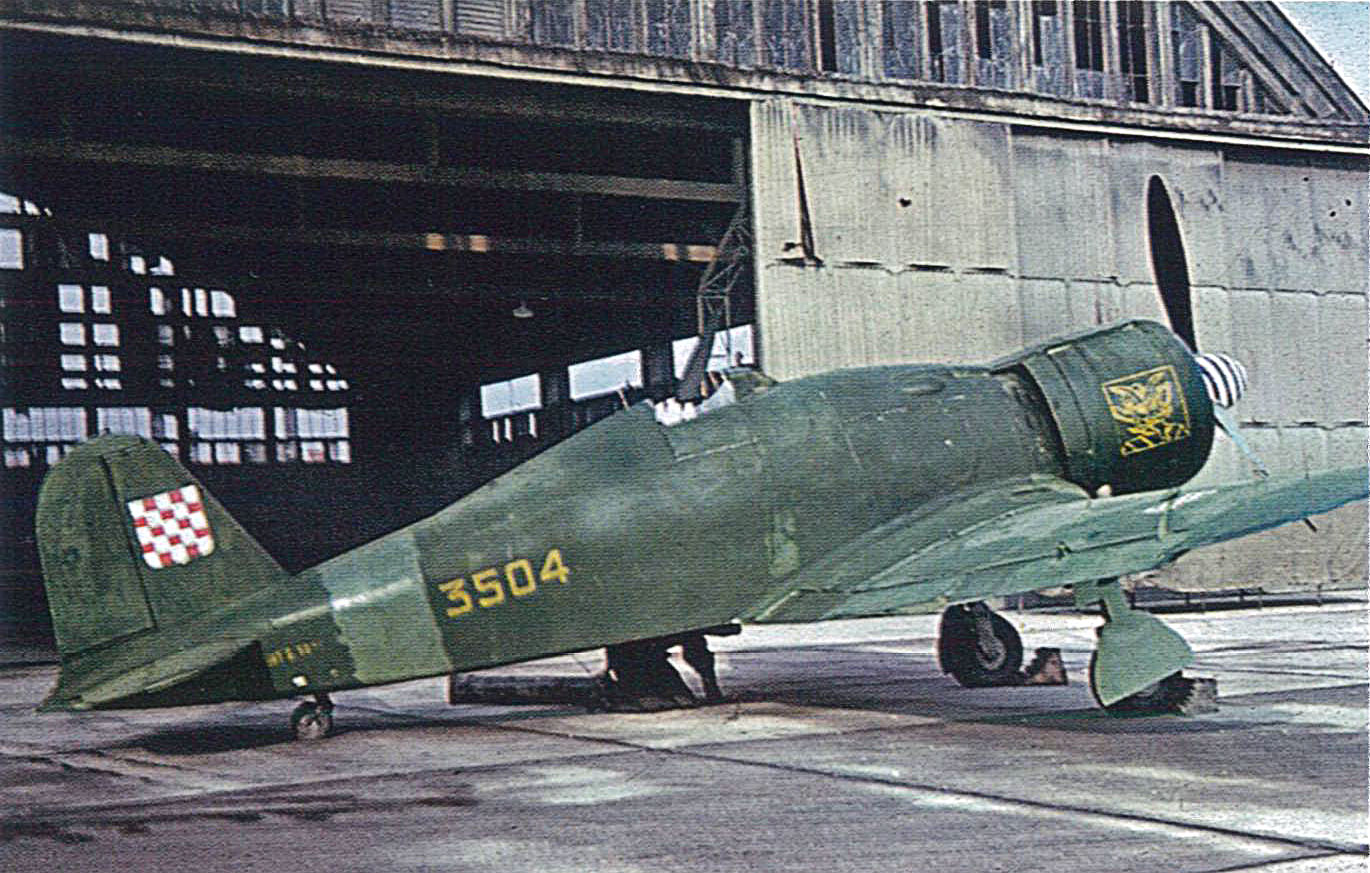
Fiat G.50 in August 1944.

The Air Force of the Independent State of Croatia came into existence in July 1941. During the war, much of the force's capacity was sent to the Eastern Front as the Croatian Air Force Legion (Croatian: Hrvatska zrakoplovna legija, German: Kroatische Luftwaffen Legion). This consisted of one fighter squadron equipped with Messerschmitt Bf 109 fighters and one bomber squadron equipped with Dornier Do 17 bombers. The fighter squadron served in Soviet Union as part of the German JG 52. Many of the unit's pilots became aces, including; Mato Dukovac, Cvitan Galić, Franjo Džal, and many more. The Air Force of the Independent State of Croatia (Croatian: Zrakoplovstvo Nezavisne Države Hrvatske, ZNDH) came into being as early as 19 April 1941, just nine days after the proclamation of the Independent Croat State. Croatia had a large fleet of relatively modern aircraft during the Second World War usually of German origin, but also ex-Royal Yugoslav, Italian, French, British and Czech. The fleet numbered several hundred aircraft, from training biplanes to the latest Messerschmitt Bf 109 fighters. All ZNDH aircraft captured at the end of World War II were incorporated into the Yugoslav People's Army inventory.

On the Allied side, when the Partisan forces started forming their own air force squadrons (based on donated Allied planes, as well as captured ZNDH aircraft) towards the end of the war, a number of Croats with previous flying experience (ZNDH defectors, USAAF pilots of Yugoslav descent, pre-war civilian pilots), as well as previously untrained personnel, took part in the effort. Most famous unit was the No. 352 Squadron RAF. Founders of the Partisan Air Force were Croatian pilots Rudi Čajavec and Franjo Kluz, both defected from ZNDH. They both received the title of People's Hero of Yugoslavia. The only known Fiat G.50 still in existence is currently in the Museum of Aviation in Surčin, Croatian pilot Andrija Arapović defected with his aircraft to allied airfield on island of Vis in 1944.

Other notable aviators of Croatian descent were Miroslaw Ferić flying for Polish Air Force, French Air Force and Royal Air Force, Carl J. Luksic and Michael J. Novosel for the USAAF

== Cold War ==
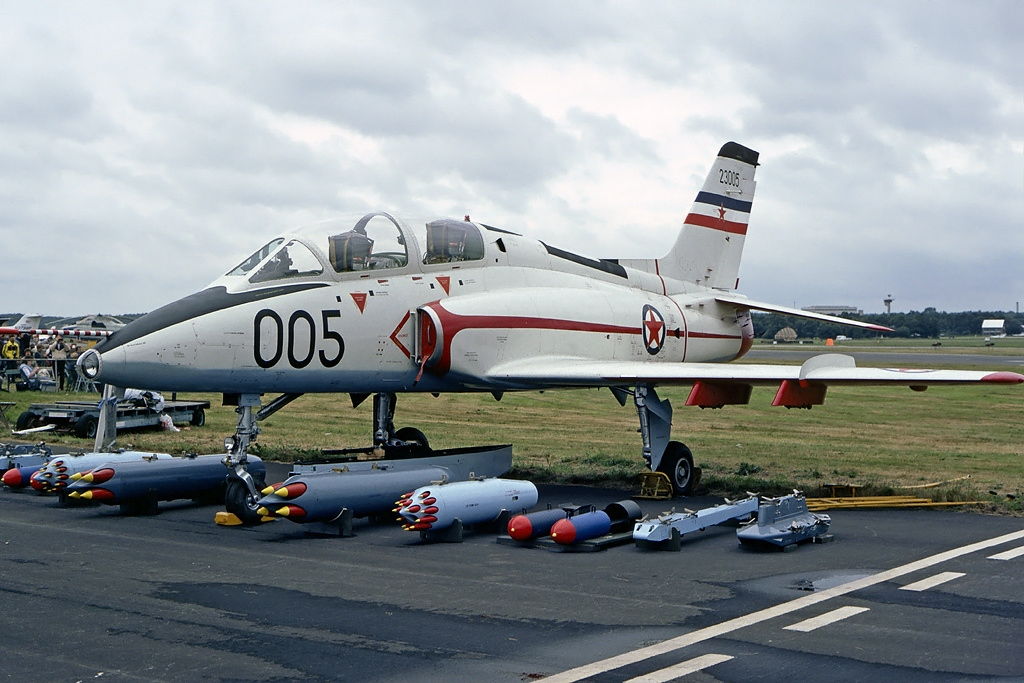
Yugoslav G-4 Super Galeb

After World War II the Yugoslav Air Force was formed upon the creation of Socialist Federal Republic of Yugoslavia and existed until the breakup of Yugoslavia in 1991. The post-war organization of air force was based on the Soviet pattern. Virtually all of the initial equipment was supplied by the Soviet Union – the aircraft captured during the war had quickly been retired. United States donated equipment after the Yugoslav break-up in relations with Soviets. During the 1970s almost all the American jets were replaced by Soviet fighters and domestic attack/trainer jets.

Anton Cvjetković was Croatian constructor who emigrated to the United States after World War II. At North American Rockwell he worked on the Apollo project as a lead engineer. His work on the B-1 bomber and the Space Shuttle was also important. He remained world-famous for a series of designs of light sports aircraft. George Martin Skurla was Croatian American aeronautical engineer responsible for overseeing the production of the Lunar Modules for the Apollo Program. He oversaw operations for the design and production of the F-14 Tomcat and A-6 Intruder aircraft and was elected president of Grumman Corporation in 1985.

== Croatian War of Independence ==
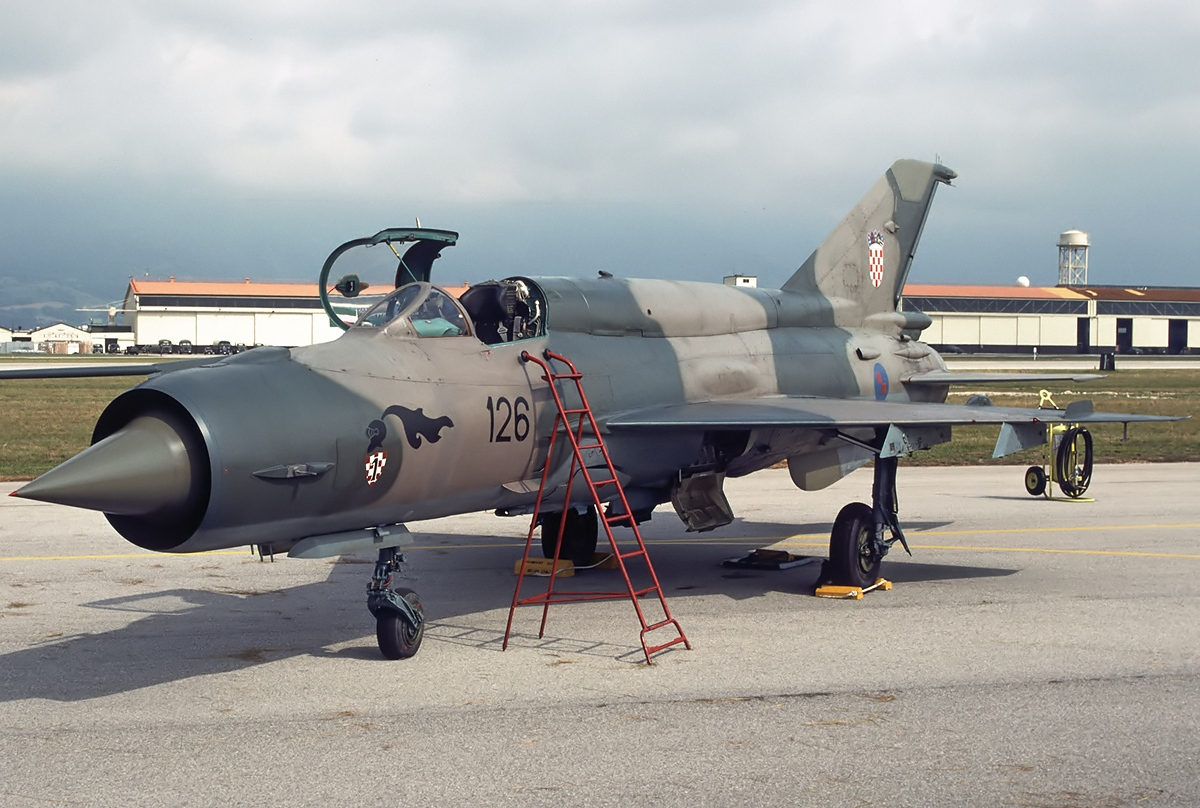
Croatian MiG-21bis

The Croatian Air Force as it is known now was officially established on 12 December 1991, during the Croatian War of Independence from Yugoslavia. At first, only small agricultural and transport planes, were used to fight a far superior, Serb-led Yugoslav National Army that took almost all aircraft which were, in fact, the property of all ex-Yugoslav states. In 1991, the Yugoslav Air Force had about 450 aircraft and 190 helicopters. Some UTVA-75s were fitted with 90-mm rocket-propelled grenades launchers and improvised ordnance like pressurized containers or acetylene tubes filled with explosives, known as "boiler bombs". A number of Antonov An-2 biplanes used for crop-spraying or leased from parachute clubs were also converted by Croatian Forces to drop makeshift bombs and were used in supply missions to the town of Vukovar and other besieged parts of Croatia. The main advantage for the An-2 was that they could take off and land on small or improvised airstrips. They were also used to drop supplies by parachute to isolated garrisons. At least one An-2 was shot down on 2 December 1991 over Vinkovci, eastern Slavonia, by Serbian SAM missiles, with the loss of its crew of four. Among the dead was Commander Marko Živković, the mastermind behind the resupply missions. It is claimed that he developed a GPS navigational system to drop cargoes with an accuracy of 10 metres. Croatia was eventually able to acquire three MiG-21s (brought over by JNA defectors) by late 1992 when the first fighter squadron was formed. Soon, by evading the embargo on weapons, almost 40 MiG-21bis/UM fighters were acquired. Around 25 were put into service while the rest served as a source for spare parts. The helicopter force was basically created during the war period by purchasing around 20 Mil Mi-8 transports and 10 Mi-24 gunships, which were used to a devastating effect in 1995 during Operation Storm. During the war Croatian forces downed more than 40 enemy aircraft and lost 3 MiG-21 to enemy fire.

=== Modern Croatian Air Force ===
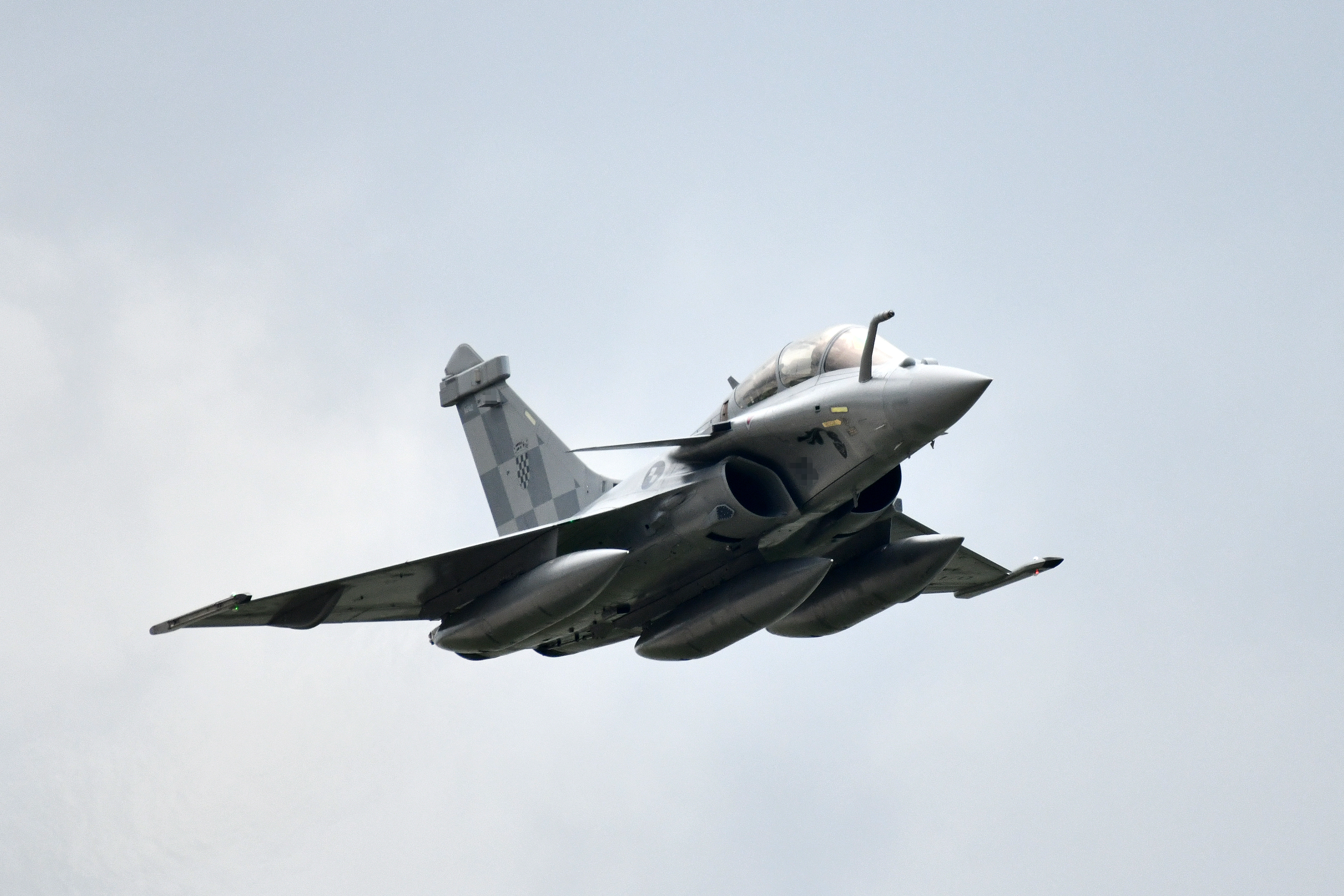
Arrival of first Rafale F3-R

Republic of Croatia entered into Partnership for Peace in 2000, which began the process of accession into the alliance. It received an invitation to join at the 2008 Bucharest summit and became a full member of NATO on 1 April 2009. The country applied for EU membership in 2003 and became the European Union's 28th member state on 1 July 2013.

After the war, many aircraft were withdrawn from service, and modern ones were also obtained, notably 20 Pilatus PC-9M and 10 Bell 206B-3 in 1997. After 2003 almost the whole fleet was modernized or completely overhauled. Russian Federation sold Croatia 10 Mil Mi-171Sh transport helicopters in 2006 to partly repay its old debt from the times of the Soviet Union. First Zlin Z 242L trainer aircraft were acquired in 2007. In 2013, Croatian government decided to retire its fleet of Antonov An-32B tactical transport aircraft and instead rely on its allies for tactical transport. The air force obtained 16 Bell OH-58D Kiowa Warrior from the US in 2016 and 2017 and these were assigned to the Helicopter Squadron at 93rd air Base.

Croatia has been attempting to replace its ageing MiG-21 fighters with new western fighters. The country opted to acquire 12 ex-Israeli General Dynamics F-16C/D Barak aircraft in 2017 but the sale was cancelled in early 2019 following inability to obtain relevant export approvals from the USA. Instead, Croatia purchased 12 French Dassault Rafale fighters in 2021. In 2022 Croatia acquired its first Sikorsky UH-60M Black Hawk transport helicopter. After Russian invasion of Ukraine, Croatia donated its Mil Mi-8 transport helicopters to Ukraine and arranged with United States the procurement of eight more Black Hawks, thus bringing the total number of these transport helicopters in its service to 12.

=== Retired aircraft ===
Image	Aircraft	Origin	Type	Variant	Retired	Notes
Combat aircraft
	Mikoyan-Gurevich MiG-21	Soviet Union	Fighter / Interceptor	MiG-21bis-D/UMD	40	Retired on 5 August 2024.
SOKO G-2 Galeb	SOKO G-2 Galeb	Yugoslavia	Jet trainer / Ground attack	G-2A	3	Captured in Operation Storm and retired in 1996.
SOKO J-21 Jastreb	SOKO J-21 Jastreb	Yugoslavia	Light attack aircraft	J-21	1	Captured in Operation Storm and retired in 1996.
SOKO J-20 Kraguj	SOKO J-20 Kraguj	Yugoslavia	Counter-insurgency aircraft	J-20	1	Captured in Operation Storm and retired in 1996.
Transport aircraft
An-32B	Antonov An-32	Soviet Union	Cargo aircraft	An-32B	2	Retired in 2014 and transferred to Ukraine in 2024.
An-2	Antonov An-2	Soviet Union	Utility aircraft	An-2	16	Used for transport and as improvised bombers at the beginning of the Croatian War of Independence. Retired in 2002.
Dornier Do 28	Dornier Do 28	Germany	Utility aircraft	Do 28D-2	1	Retired in 2004.
Canadair CL-604	Canadair Challenger CL-604	Canada	Business jet	CL-600-2B16	2	Used for EMS and VIP transport, transferred to civil register.
Aerial firefighting
CL-215	Canadair CL-215	Canada	Water bomber	CL-215A	2	Replaced with CL-415 in 2004.
Air Tractor AT-400	Air Tractor AT-400	United States	Agricultural aircraft	AT-400	2	Ex-civil, retired in 1993.
PZL M-18 Dromader	PZL-Mielec M-18 Dromader	Poland	Agricultural aircraft	M-18	2	Ex-civil, retired in 1992.
Trainer aircraft
UTVA 75	UTVA 75	Yugoslavia	Trainer	75A21	11	Replaced with Zlín Z 242L in 2007.
UTVA 66	UTVA 66	Yugoslavia	Trainer	66H/V	4	Retired in 1999.
Cessna 172	Cessna 172	United States	Utility aircraft	Cessna 172	4	Ex-civil, retired in 1997.
Piper PA-28 Warrior	Piper PA-28 Warrior	United States	Utility aircraft	PA-28-161 Warrior II	3	Ex-civil, retired in 1997.
Piper PA-18 Super Cub	Piper PA-18 Super Cub	United States	Utility aircraft	PA-18	4	Ex-civil, retired in 1996.
Helicopters
Mil Mi-24	Mil Mi-24	Soviet Union	Attack helicopter	Mi-24D/V	12	Retired in 2005 and offered for sale.
Mi-8	Mil Mi-8	Soviet Union	Transport helicopter	Mi-8MTV-1/T/PS-11	36	14 were transferred to Ukraine in October 2023.
MD 500	MD Helicopters MD 500	United States	Utility helicopter	MD 500D	4	Retired in 2001.
Bell 47J Ranger	Bell 47J Ranger	United States	Utility helicopter	AB.47J-2A	1	Ex-museum, retired in 1992 and returned to Nikola Tesla Technical Museum.

=== Retired munitions ===
Name	Origin	Type	Platform
R-60	Soviet Union	Air-to-air missile	MiG-21
9K114 Shturm	Soviet Union	Anti-tank guided missile	Mi-24
S-5	Soviet Union	Rocket	MiG-21, Mi-24
S-24	Soviet Union	Rocket	MiG-21, Mi-24
FAB-250	Soviet Union	General-purpose bomb	MiG-21
FAB-500	Soviet Union	General-purpose bomb	MiG-21
Mark 44	United States	Anti-submarine torpedo	Mi-24

=== Retired anti-aircraft systems and radars ===
Name	Origin	Type
S-300	Soviet Union	Long-range surface-to-air missile system
9K38 Igla	Soviet Union	Man-portable air-defense system
9K32 Strela-2	Soviet Union	Man-portable air-defense system
9K34 Strela-3	Soviet Union	Man-portable air-defense system
ZSU-57-2	Soviet Union	Self-propelled anti-aircraft gun
M53/59 Praga	Czechoslovakia	Self-propelled anti-aircraft gun
Bofors L/70	Sweden	Towed anti-aircraft gun
Zastava M55	Yugoslavia	Towed anti-aircraft gun
P-15	Soviet Union	Surveillance / Target acquisition radar
SNAR-10	Soviet Union	Battlefield surveillance radar

== See also ==
- Austro-Hungarian Imperial and Royal Aviation Troops
- List of Croatian World War I flying aces
- Yugoslav Royal Air Force
- Air Force of the Independent State of Croatia
- Croatian Air Force Legion
- List of World War II aces from Croatia
- Yugoslav Partisan Air Force
- Balkan Air Force
- Yugoslav Air Force
- Croatian Air Force
