= List of World War I flying aces from Austria =

This list of World War I flying aces from Austria contains the names of aces born in the territory of the modern-day Republic of Austria, which formed part of the Austro-Hungarian Empire. Austria-Hungary was a constitutional union of the Austrian Empire (Cisleithania) and the Kingdom of Hungary (Transleithania) which existed from 1867 to 1918, when it collapsed as a result of defeat in World War I.

Name	Victories	Notes
Benno Fiala von Fernbrugg	28	Third ranking ace of the Luftfahrtruppen.
Adolf Heyrowsky	12	
Kurt Gruber	11	
Franz Rudorfer	11	
Raoul Stojsavljevic	10	
Georg Kenzian	9	
Ludwig Hautzmayer	7	
Franz Peter	6	
Josef Pürer	6	
Franz Lahner	5	
Friedrich Lang	5	The only Austrian naval ace.
Johann Lasi	5	
Alois Rodlauer	5	
Karl Urban	5	

== See also ==
- List of World War I flying aces
- List of World War I flying aces from the Austro-Hungarian Empire
- List of World War I flying aces from Croatia
- List of World War I flying aces from Hungary
