= List of World War I flying aces from Hungary =

Catalog of WW1 Hungarian Aces

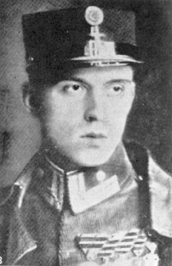
Top ace József Kiss

This list of World War I flying aces from Hungary contains the names of aces from the territory of modern-day Hungary, which formed part of the Austro-Hungarian Empire. Austria-Hungary was a constitutional union of the Austrian Empire (Cisleithania) and the Kingdom of Hungary (Transleithania) which existed from 1867 to 1918, when it collapsed as a result of defeat in World War I.

Among the Austro-Hungarian aviators were the Hungarian-born aces listed below.

Name	Victories	Notes
József Kiss	19 victories	Hungary's leading ace was the only noncommissioned officer in the Luftfahrtruppen to be commissioned as an officer.
Franz Gräser	18 victories	Hungary's second leading ace was an aerial gunner turned self-taught pilot.
Stefan Fejes	16 victories	
Karl Kaszala	8 victories	
Alexander Tahy	8 victories	
Johann Risztics	7 victories	Set post-war world aviation records.
Johann Frint	6 victories	
Alexander Kasza	6 victories	
Julius Busa	5 victories	
Friedrich Hefty	5 victories	
Johann Lasi	5 victories	
Béla Macourek	5 victories	Flew for the Red Air Corps post-war.
Rudolf Szepessy-Sokoll	5 victories	Flew first strategic aerial bombing mission in history.

== See also ==
- List of Austrians
- List of Hungarians
- List of World War I flying aces from Austria
- List of World War I flying aces from Austria-Hungary
- Lists of World War I flying aces
