= List of Croatian World War I flying aces =

List

The Austro-Hungarian Empire's Luftfahrtruppen contained many pilots from many ethnic minorities. The following list of their World War I flying aces contains those Austro-Hungarian aces identified as ethnic Croatian or born in the territory of modern-day Croatia:

- Miroslav Navratil, 10 verified victories.
- Raoul Stojsavljevic, 10 verified victories.
- Roman Schmidt, 6 verified victories.
- Johann Lasi, 5 verified victories.

== See also ==
- List of World War I flying aces
- List of World War I flying aces from the Austro-Hungarian Empire
- List of World War I aces credited with 10 victories
- List of World War I aces credited with 6 victories
- List of World War I aces credited with 5 victories
