= List of World War I flying aces from Serbia =

Three of the flying aces of World War I were ethnic Serbs or born in the territory of the modern-day Serbian Republic. They were:

Petar Pierre Marinovich

- Petar Marinovich, who scored 21 victories while flying for France's Aéronautique Militaire.
- Johann Lasi, who scored 5 victories while flying for the Austro-Hungarian Luftfahrtruppen.
- Raoul Stojsavljevic, a 10 victory Luftfahrtruppen ace, was an ethnic Serbian born in Innsbruck, Austria

== See also ==
- List of World War I flying aces
- List of World War I aces credited with 20 or more victories
- List of World War I aces credited with 10 victories
- List of World War I aces credited with 5 victories
- List of World War I flying aces from Austria-Hungary
