= List of World War I Slovak flying aces =

Many men among the aviators of the Austro-Hungarian Luftfahrtruppen were of the Slovak ethnic minority, living in what was then part of the Kingdom of Hungary. Austria-Hungary was a constitutional union of the Austrian Empire (Cisleithania) and the Kingdom of Hungary (Transleithania) which existed from 1867 to 1918, when it collapsed as a result of defeat in World War I. The aces listed below either were born in present-day Slovak Republic, were of Slovak ethnic identity, or both.

Name	Victories	Notes
Karl Kaszala	8	Born Nitra (Nyitra). Awarded the Iron Cross (2nd class).
Béla Macourek	5	Born Bratislava (Pozsony). Awarded the Military Merit Cross and Medal.
Franz Wognar	5	Born Trnava (Nagyszombat). Received five (1 gold and 4 silver) awards of the Medal for Bravery.

== See also ==
- Flying ace
- List of World War I flying aces
- List of World War I flying aces from Austria-Hungary
- List of World War I aces credited with 15–19 victories
- List of World War I aces credited with 9 victories
- List of World War I aces credited with 8 victories
- List of World War I aces credited with 7 victories
- List of World War I aces credited with 5 victories
