= Macourek =

Macourek is a Czech surname. Notable people with the surname include:

- Miloš Macourek (1926–2002), Czech poet, playwright, author, and screenwriter
- Béla Macourek (1889–?), World War I Czech flying ace
