= Ernst Strohschneider =

Austro-Hungarian flying ace

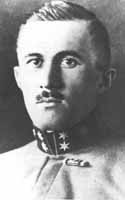
- Austro-Hungarian flying ace during World War I
- Born: 6 September 1886; Aussig an der Elbe, Bohemia, Austria-Hungary
- Died: 21 March 1918 (aged 31); Motta di Livenza, Italy
- Military career
- Allegiance: Austro-Hungarian Empire
- Branch: Aviation
- Service years: 1913–1918
- Rank: Oberleutnant
- Units: 24th Infantry Regiment, 42nd Infantry Regiment, Fliegerkompanie 23, Fliegerkompanie 28, Flugegeschwader I, Fliegerkompanie 42J,
- Commands: Fliegerkompanie 42J (temporarily), Fliegerkompanie 61J, Fliegerkompanie 62J (de facto)
- Awards: Knight's Cross of the Order of Leopold with War Decoration and Swords; Order of the Iron Crown, Third Class, with War Decoration and Swords; Silver Military Merit Medal with Swords; Military Merit Medal Third Class

Oberleutnant Ernst Strohschneider was an Austro-Hungarian flying ace during World War I. He was credited with 15 confirmed aerial victories during his rise to the simultaneous command of two fighter squadrons. He died in a flying accident on 21 March 1918.

== Early life ==
Ernst Strohschneider was born on 6 September 1886 in Aussig an der Elbe (present day Ústí nad Labem), Czech Republic. He was of Sudeten German parentage, and his family was well-to-do. When old enough, he joined the infantry and was commissioned as a second lieutenant in the reserves in January 1913. He was serving with the 28th Infantry Regiment on the Serbian front when World War I began.

== World War I ==
Strohschneider was wounded by a bullet in the tibia early in the war, on 28 August 1914. After hospitalization, he was posted to a Guards unit, the 42nd Infantry Regiment on the Russian Front. He went into bitter winter battle at the Chryszcata Heights in the Carpathian Mountains and suffered a knee wound on 9 February 1915. He returned from hospital after this injury to command a machine gun section. On 19 September 1915, he was wounded for the third time, and captured by the Russians. He escaped to friendly lines. After convalescence, he was then invalided from the army as unfit for further service.

He joined the Luftfahrtruppen and was trained as an aerial observer at the Officer's Flight School at Wiener-Neustadt by March 1916. He was posted to Heinrich Kostrba's Flik 23 in the South Tyrol, where his first win went unconfirmed. More notable were his long and hazardous reconnaissance flights deep into enemy territory and his bombing missions flown through heavy antiaircraft fire.

Once transferred to Flik 28 along the Isonzo, he soon trained as a pilot, returning to Wiener-Nieustadt. While attending school there, he taught student observers while also undergoing flight training. He qualified as a pilot on 30 December 1916, and received Austrian Pilot Certificate No. 596 on 30 January 1917. The new pilot was posted to Flugegeschwader I on the Isonzo line. Here he and Julius Arigi flew as fighter escort to the unit's bombers and Strohschneider scored his first two victories despite a certain lack of finesse at the controls, as on 17 April 1917, he wrecked Hansa-Brandenburg D.I serial number 28.08. However, this assignment saw him awarded the Silver Military Merit Medal with Swords, as well as the Military Merit Medal Third Class.

Strohschneider was then transferred from his general purpose assignment to a fighter squadron at Prosecco when he was appointed second-in-command of Flik 42J. He would score nine victories during his tenure with this squadron. He would also befriend Reserve Leutnant Franz Gräser, with whom he ultimately shared seven victories. However, in an incident that demonstrated Strohschneider's belief in the rigid Austro-Hungarian class structure, he was the squadron's sole officer who did not congratulate an enlisted fellow ace on a medal awarded in October 1917. The incident did not harm Strohschneider's professional reputation; on 29 October he was commended by his superiors for his exemplary temporary command of his squadron.

He was then posted to command of a fighter unit, Flik 61J on 28 December 1917, the first reserve lieutenant to do so. He was joined by his friend, Franz Gräser, at Flik 61J's field at Motta di Livenza. Strohschneider also found himself simultaneously commanding a second fighter squadron while its commander Karl Nikitsch was ill. Under Strohschneider's leadership, Flik 61J undertook a wide variety of missions. It flew fighter interceptions, fighter escort missions, strafed trenches and artillery batteries, attacked enemy airfields and naval ships. They also flew night sorties. Strohschneider was awarded the Order of the Iron Crown, Third Class, with War Decoration and Swords for his feats.

On the night of 20 March 1918, Ernst Strohschneider took off in Phonix D.I s/n 228.36 to accompany a five plane night mission against an Italian position at Zenson di Piave. His return in the early morning hours of 21 March ended in a fatal crash. He was posthumously honored with the Knight's Cross of the Order of Leopold with War Decoration and Swords.

== List of aerial victories ==
Credited victories are numbered. Others are marked "u/c" for "unconfirmed".

| No. | Date/time | Aircraft | Foe | Result | Location | Notes |
|---|---|---|---|---|---|---|
| u/c | 15 June 1916 @ 0730 hours | Lloyd C.III serial number 43.61 | Italian seaplane | | Cima Alta | Pilot: Oberleutnant Franz Schorn |
| 1 | 3 June 1917 @ 1030 hours | Hansa-Brandenburg D.I | Farman two-seater reconnaissance plane | Holed gas tank | Monte Korada | Confirmed by both air and ground observers |
| 2 | 21 June 1917 | Hansa-Brandenburg D.I. | Farman two-seater | | Cormons, Italy | |
| 3 | 23 September 1917 | Unknown | French Spad fighter | Set on fire | Nova Vas, Croatia, near Kostanjevica | Victory shared with Ferdinand Udvardy. Confirmed by both air and ground observers |
| 4 | 23 September 1917 | Unknown | Savoia Pomilio two-seater | Crashed | Kostanjevica, Croatia | Victory shared with Ferdinand Udvardy. Confirmed by both air and ground observers |
| 5 | 26 September 1917 | Unknown | Spad fighter | | Ronchi, Italy | Victory shared with Ferdinand Udvardy, Karl Teichmann, and Vincenz Magerl |
| 6 | 3 October 1917 | Probably an Albatros D.III fighter | French Spad two-seater | Pilot F. Di Rudini KIA | Gradisca d'Isonzo, Italy | Confirmed by both air and ground observers. |
| 7 | 25 October 1917 | Probably an Albatros D.III | Italian seaplane | Set on fire | Grado, Friuli–Venezia Giulia, Italy | Victory shared with Franz Gräser |
| 8 | 26 October 1917 | Probably an Albatros D.III | Italian seaplane | | Grado, Friuli–Venezia Giulia, Italy | |
| 9 | 27 October 1917 | Probably an Albatros D.III | Italian seaplane | Set afire | | Victory shared with Franz Gräser |
| 10 | 15 November 1917 | Probably an Albatros D.III | Sopwith | | Meolo Monastier di Treviso | Victory shared with Franz Gräser |
| 11 | 29 November 1917 | Probably an Albatros D.III | SAML S.2 2 seater | Forced to land; Italian aircrew captured (Tenente Vincenzo Lioy and Sergente Francesco Montesi) | Casa Tagli | Victory shared with Franz Gräser, Karl Patzelt |
| 12 | 26 January 1918 @ 1810 hours | Albatros D.III fighter | seaplane | | "swamp area" of Lagune Palude Maggiore | Victory shared with Franz Gräser |
| 13 | 30 January 1918 | Albatros D.III fighter serial number 153.119 | Sopwith two-seater | | Cana Reggio | Victory shared with Franz Gräser. Strohschneider WIA |
| 14 | 24 February 1918 | Albatros D.III 153.119 | Macchi M.5 flying boat marked "M-18" | Crashed with pilot WIA | Marcello | Victory shared with Franz Gräser and two other pilots |
| 15 | 16 March 1918 | Albatros D.III 153.119 | Italian Ansaldo S.V.A. | Crashed into a somersaulting wreck | Casonetti, near Porto di Piave Vecchia | Victory shared with Franz Gräser |

== See also ==
Aerial victory standards of World War I
