= Roman Schmidt (pilot) =

Croatian aviator (1893–1959)

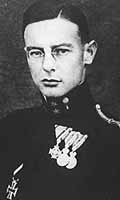
- Roman Schmidt wearing his military decorations
- Born: 6 November 1893; Varaždin, Croatia
- Died: 5 April 1959 (aged 65)
- Military career
- Allegiance: Austro-Hungarian Empire
- Branch: Artillery, Austro-Hungarian Aviation Troops
- Service years: 1913-1918
- Rank: Oberleutnant
- Units: 36th Artillery Regiment; Flik 7; Flik 13; Flik 30J; Flik 74J; Flik 26
- Awards: Order of the Iron Crown, Military Merit Cross, Bronze and Silver Military Merit Medal

Roman Oto Kažimir Schmidt or Roman Šmidt (1893-1959) was a World War I flying ace of the Austro-Hungarian Aviation Troops (air force), credited with six aerial victories.

== Biography ==
=== Early life and artillery service ===
Roman Schmidt was born on 1 November 1893 in Varaždin, Croatia. He attended a technical university and completed his education despite being called for his mandatory military service in 1913. As World War I began, he was a fahnrich (officer candidate) in the 36th Artillery Regiment. He was commissioned and promoted to oberleutnant. He transitioned to aviation as an aerial observer.

=== Aviation service ===
His first aerial victory was scored on the Russian front, whilst posted with Fliegerkompanen 7 (Flik 7, for Aviation Company 7), and flying a Hansa-Brandenburg C.I, when he together with pilot Paul Hablitschek on April 13, 1917, shot down a Russian Nieuport Scout in the vicinity of Bohorodzany. (In accordance with Austro-Hungarian practice as Oberleutenant and officer Schmidt was acting as observer and gunner.) Later that year he was transferred to Flik 13, which was also fighting on the Russian front. On September 8, over Razbita in a twin-seater type Oeffag C.II, he and Oberleutenant Miroslav Navratil downed a Russian Nieuport fighter. On October 4, flying a Lloyd 40.11 twin-seater with the pilot Zugsführer Adolf Wiltsch, they shot down another a single-seat fighter, marking Schmidt's third kill in 1917.

Schmidt flew with Flik 30J on the Italian front from May 1918. On July 12, whilst flying a Phönix D.I numbered 128.12, he downed an Italian twin-seater (type SAML) over enemy territory. His fifth kill occurred eleven days later, on July 23, when he shot down an RAF Bristol F.2 Fighter from 139th Squadron over Godega di Sant'Urbano; both the pilot and the observer perished in the crash. During that period, Flik 30J was based at the San Pietro di Campo airfield. His sixth and last victory was gained on October 27, 1918, when he shot down an Italian Caproni Ca.3 heavy bomber in the area around Belluno.

== Post World War I ==
Schmidt died on 5 April 1959.
