= Friedrich Lang (World War I ace) =

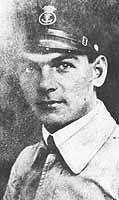
- Friedrich Lang in 1918
- Born: 17 September 1894; Austria
- Died: 26 April 1937 (aged 42)
- Military career
- Allegiance: Austria-Hungary
- Branch: Austro-Hungarian Navy
- Rank: Fregattenleutnant (Frigate Lieutenant)
- Units: Kumbor Naval Air Station, Durazzo Naval Air Station, Pola Naval Air Station
- Awards: Order of the Iron Crown, Medal for Bravery, 2 awards of Military Merit Cross, Military Merit Medal

Fregattenleutnant (Frigate Lieutenant) Friedrich Lang (17 September 1894 – 26 April 1937) was a World War I flying ace. He emerged from obscurity to begin his military career in 1912 by training for sea duty. He was serving on SMS Balaton when World War I began. In March 1916, he transferred to aviation duty. He would score five confirmed aerial victories by war's end. He was one of only two flying aces of the Austro-Hungarian Navy, the other being Gottfried von Banfield. Postwar, Lang lapsed back into obscurity.

== Early life ==
Friedrich Lang was born an Austrian citizen of Austria-Hungary, though his birth date and birthplace are unknown. After completing secondary school, he joined the Austro-Hungarian Navy. On 11 September 1912, he was sent to Naval Cadet School for basic training.

== Sea service ==
After completion of training, Lang served on several vessels. Having served with distinction, he was appointed as a Seekadett on 1 February 1914. He was still shipboard as the First World War began. Aboard the SMS Balaton, he first saw combat at this time, winning a Second Class award of the Silver Bravery Medal. He also promoted to Ensign on 1 July 1915. However, as 1915 ended, he tired of shipboard routine; in early 1916, he applied for transfer to aviation training.

== Aviation service ==
=== Seaplane victories ===
His wish was granted; he began aviation training at Pula (present day Croatia) on 21 March 1916. On 1 May, he was promoted again, to Fregattenleutnant (frigate lieutenant). On 20 June 1916, he was granted Austrian Naval Pilot Certificate No. 60. After a fleeting posting to Kotor (present day Montenegro), he was assigned to fly varying types of aircraft from the naval air station at Durrës (present day Albania). His initial air combat followed soon thereafter.

On the morning of 22 August 1916, six Italian two-seater Farmans raided Durrës. Lang intercepted them in his Lohner T-1 flying boat. Lang closed to 150 meters on one of the Farmans between the Skumbi River delta and Cape Laghi, and his gunner opened fire. After a ten-minute machine gun duel, the Italian Farman jettisoned its bombs and crashlanded on the sea near one of their destroyers. At that, a second Farman attacked the victorious Austro-Hungarian air crew. Lang closed to 30 meters, and the pair of two-seaters swirled into vicious close-quarter combat for the next 30 minutes. The Farman's French air crew finally ceded way at 0800 and they glided down to the sea's surface near a destroyer. Lang barely managed to coax his bullet-riddled machine back to base for repair.

In January 1917, Lang was transferred to the large naval base at Pola, a much busier station. During the next nine months, his valorous service flying a variety of missions earned him two more awards—the Military Merit Cross Third Class with War Decorations and Swords, and the Silver Military Merit Medal with Swords.

=== Fighter victories ===
By September 1917, Pola was suffering increasing Italian air assaults. It was decided to establish a dedicated fighter detachment at nearby Altura airfield; Lang was a founding member. The new detachment was equipped with Phönix D.I land-based fighters, which were much more combat capable than flying boats. This transition from flying a mixture of aircraft types to concentrating on a fighter would work to Lang's advantage.

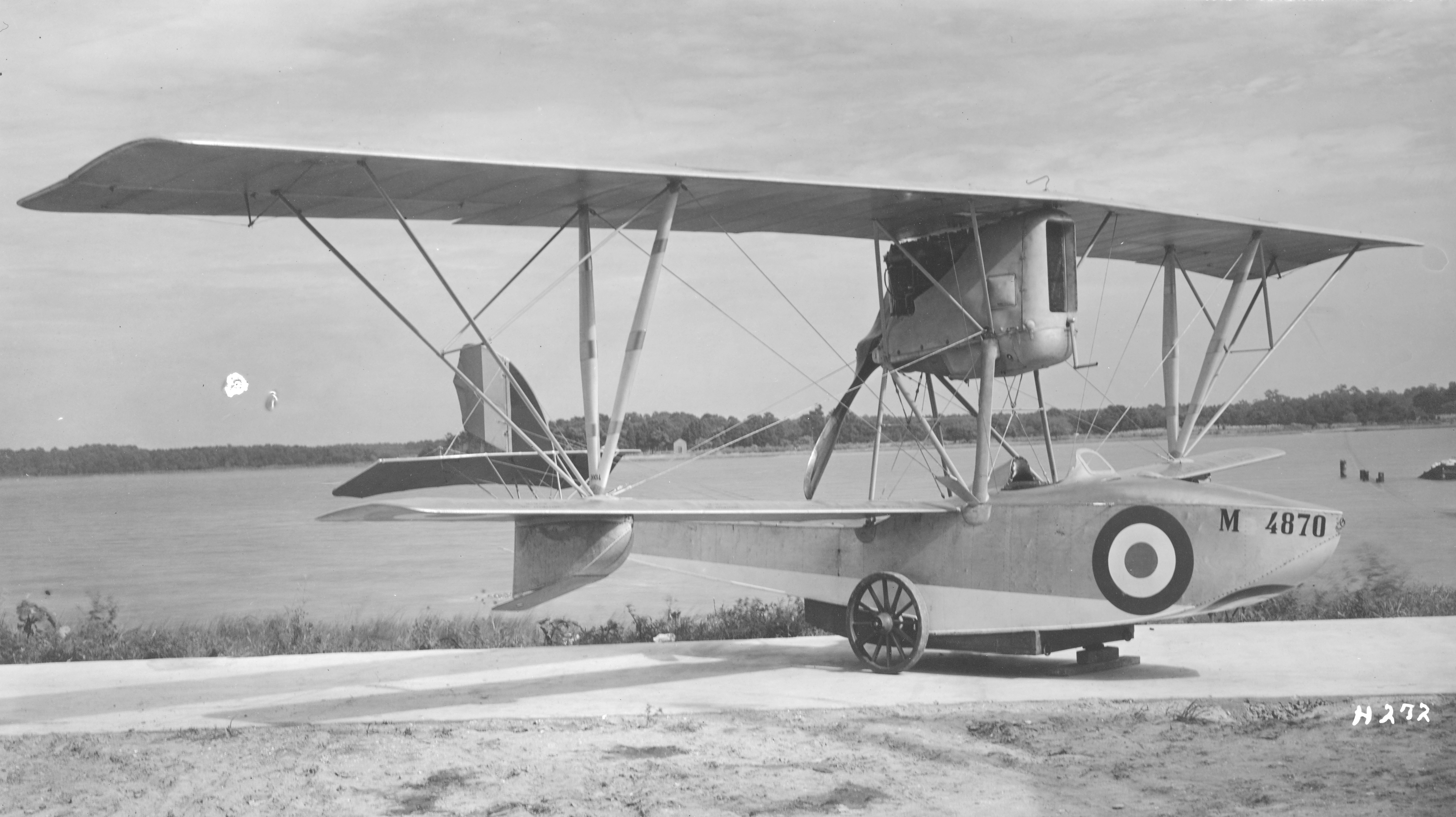
The Macchi M.5 was no match for Lang's Phönix D.I] fighter.

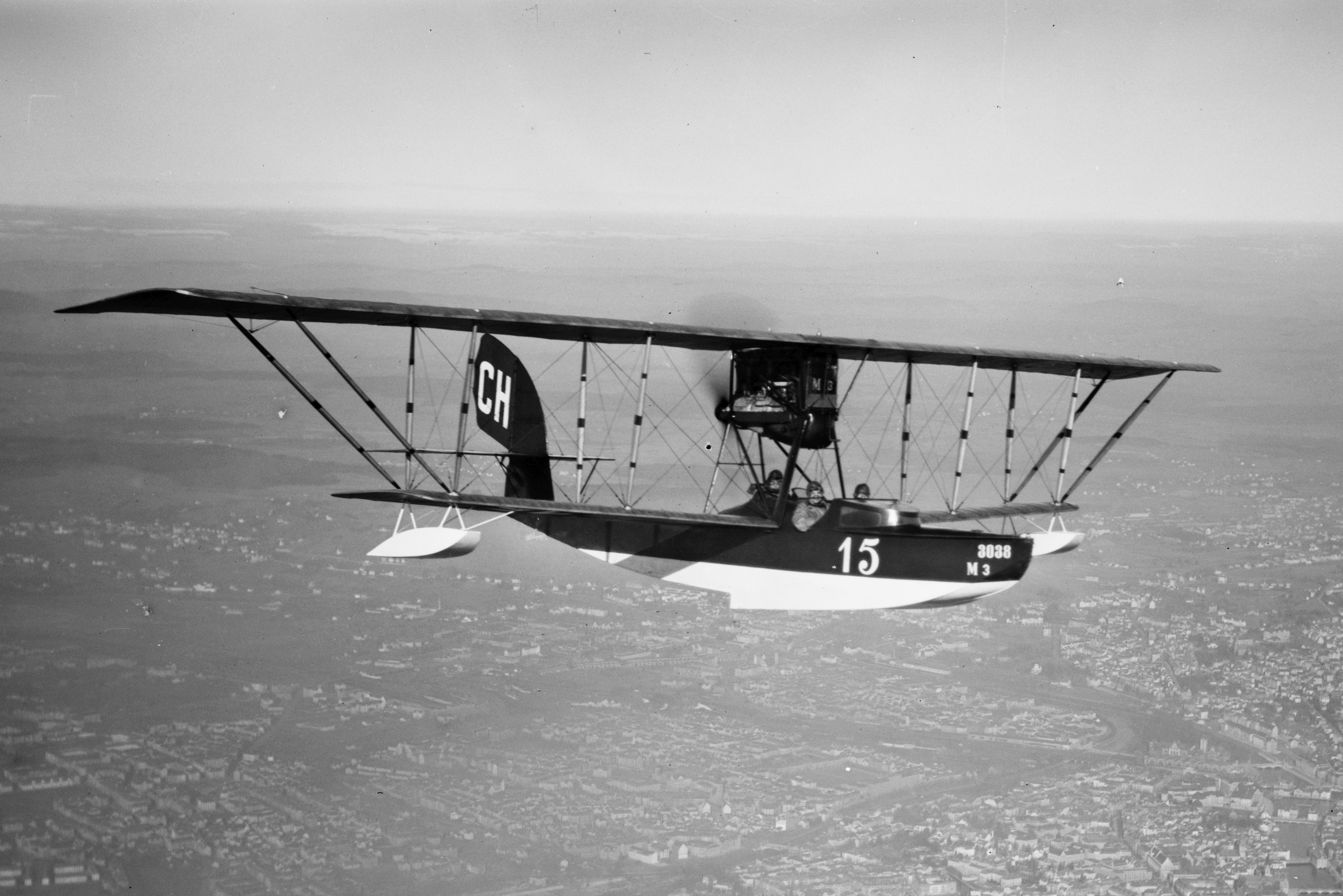
The Macchi L.3 was another flying boat that fell victim to Lang.

On 19 May 1918, Lang was flying one of four Phönix D.I fighters when the flight attacked an Italian formation consisting of two reconnaissance planes and four Macchi M.5 flying boat fighters. At 1545 hours, Lang quickly downed two of the fighters about 35 kilometers off the mouth of the Po River. Lang's third victim fell flaming into the sea and sank. His fourth victim was forced to land; an Austro-Hungarian motor torpedo boat found it adrift and sank it.

Almost three months later, at 1555 hours on 12 August 1918, Lang caught an Italian Macchi L.3 flying boat aloft at only 100 meters above the Adriatic Sea. He shot it down in flames, becoming an ace with his fifth victory. This made him only the second flying ace of the war for the Austro-Hungarian Navy, the other being Gottfried von Banfield.

Lang's diligence and bravery did not go unrewarded. He received a rare second award of the Military Merit Cross with Decorations and Swords. He also received the Order of the Iron Crown with Decorations and Swords.

== Later life ==
Friedrich Lang survived the war, even if the empire he served did not. Lang was discharged from military service on 31 March 1919, and lapsed back into obscurity. He is believed to have survived until at least the late 1930s.

== See also ==
List of World War I flying aces from Austria-Hungary

== Sources ==
- O'Connor, Martin (1994). Air Aces of the Austro-Hungarian Empire 1914 - 1918. Flying Machines Press. ISBN 978-0-9637110-1-4.
