= Ferdinand Udvardy =

Hungarian flying ace

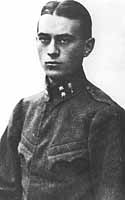
- Udvardy, c. 1918
- Born: 1895; Pozsony (now Bratislava, Slovakia)
- Died: Post 1945
- Military career
- Allegiance: Austria-Hungary
- Branch: Aviation
- Rank: Stabsfeldwebel
- Units: 72nd Infantry Regiment, Fliegerersatzkompanie 6, Fliegerkompanie 10, Fliegerkompanie 42J
- Awards: Medal for Bravery (2 Gold and 3 Silver awards)

Stabsfeldwebel Ferdinand Udvardy was a Hungarian conscript into the military of the Austro-Hungarian Empire who became a flying ace credited with nine aerial victories. Upon the dissolution of Austria-Hungary, Udvardy became a Hungarian citizen, and in the aftermath of World War I, defended his new nation against invasion.

== Before and during World War I ==
Ferdinand Udvardy was born in what was then Pozsony (today Bratislava, Slovakia) in 1895. He was of Hungarian parentage. He joined military service in 1915 and posted to the 72nd Infantry Regiment of the Austro-Hungarian Army. After infantry basic training, he volunteered for aviation training, was posted to Fliegerersatzkompanie 6, and graduated a pilot with the rank of korporal on 21 September 1916. He was assigned to Fliegerkompanie 10 on 1 October 1916, flew six combat missions in their two-seater reconnaissance craft, and promptly requested duty as a fighter pilot. He trained further, as the Hansa-Brandenburg D.I fighter was tricky to fly at lesser speeds and low altitudes, and was transferred to Fliegerkompanie 42J, which was a dedicated fighter unit, in May 1917. Flik 42J had some eight aces on its rolls: Johann Risztics, Otto Jaeger, Karl Teichmann, Friedrich Hefty, Ernst Strohschneider, Georg Kenzian, Franz Graeser, and Karl Patzelt.

Udvardy stayed with Flik 42J until war's end. The unit's equipment evolved to include Aviatik D.I and Phonix D.I fighters, but Albatros D.IIIs came to predominate. While with the unit, Udvardy won eight aerial victories, and was awarded the Gold Bravery Medal twice and the Silver Bravery Medal First Class thrice. He was wounded once, in the knee on 27 October 1917, and took three months recuperation before he could fly again. He would become close friends, both on the ground and in the air, with two other noncommissioned officers in the squadron; after Hefty and Risztics won their own Gold Bravery Medals, the trio became known as "The Golden Triumvirate". Udvardy would soldier on through being shot down without injury on 27 October 1918. He ended his war promoted to Stabsfeldwebel.

== Post World War I ==
When Austria-Hungary dissolved, Udvardy became a Hungarian citizen. He served in the 8th Squadron of the Red Air Corps, along with Risztics, Hefty, Alexander Kasza, and Stefan Fejes, when Hungary battled invaders in 1919. Udvardy won his last aerial victory against the Romanians at this time.

Udvardy is believed to have survived the Second World War, but died soon thereafter.

== List of aerial victories ==
No.	Date/time	Aircraft	Foe	Result	Location	Notes
1	10 July 1917 @ 1745 hours	Hansa-Brandenburg D.I serial number 28.42	Italian Spad fighter	Crashed	Monte Sabotino	
2	10 July 1917 @ 1750 hours	Hansa-Brandenburg D.I s/n 28.42	Italian Nieuport fighter	Downed plane destroyed by Austro-Hungarian artillery	Monte Sabotino	Victory shared with Johann Risztics
3	23 September 1917	Hansa-Brandenburg D.I	French Spad fighter		Nova Vas	Victory shared with Ernst Strohschneider
4	23 September 1917	Hansa-Brandenburg D.I	Italian Savoia-Pomilio		Vicinity of Kostanjevica	Victory shared with Ernst Strohschneider
5	26 September 1917	Hansa-Brandenburg D.I	Spad fighter	Victory shared with Ernst Strohschneider, Karl Teichmann, Vinzenz Magerl	Vicinity of Ronchi	
6	26 October 1917	Hansa-Brandenburg D.I	Italian Seaplane		Grado, Friuli-Venezia Giulia, Italy	Victory shared with Ernst Strohschneider
7	20 May 1918	Albatros D.III	Italian Hanriot HD.1		Montello	
8	20 June 1918	Albatros D.III	Italian Hanriot HD.I		Nervesa della Battaglia	
9	12 June 1919	Albatros D.III	UC.I			Won against Romanians while in 8th Squadron, Red Air Corps

== See also ==
Aerial victory standards of World War I

== Sources ==
- Franks, Norman; Guest, Russell; Alegi, Gregory (1997). Above the War Fronts: The British Two-seater Bomber Pilot and Observer Aces, the British Two-seater Fighter Observer Aces, and the Belgian, Italian, Austro-Hungarian and Russian Fighter Aces, 1914–1918. Grub Street. ISBN 978-1898697565.
- O'Connor, Martin (1994). Air Aces of the Austro-Hungarian Empire 1914 - 1918. Flying Machines Press. ISBN 978-0-9637110-1-4.
