= Mileva Roller =

Austrian painter (1886–1949)

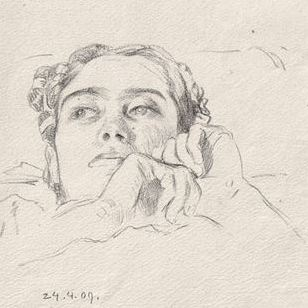
- Mileva Roller by Alfred Roller
- Born: Mileva Antonia Stoisavljevic; 18 February 1886; Innsbruck, Austria-Hungary
- Died: 6 May 1949 (aged 63); Vienna, Austria
- Occupation: Painter
- Known for: Viennese Secession movement
- Spouse: Alfred Roller

Mileva Roller (born Mileva Antonia Stoisavljevic; February 18, 1886 – May 6, 1949) was an Austrian painter in the Viennese Secession movement.

== Life ==
Mileva Stojsavljevic was born on 14 February 1886 in Innsbruck. Her father, Milos Stojsavljevic, was a Serb from Velika Popina in Croatia, and her mother, Adelheid Hohenauer, was an Austrian porcelain painting teacher at the Vienna Women's Academy. Her younger brother, Raoul Stojsavljevic, was born in 1887 and he became a flying ace.

In 1906, she married the artist Alfred Roller. They were both leading members of the Vienna Secession art movement and she, Koloman Moser, Gustav Klimt and Josef Hoffmann designed clothes for themselves and their families.

== Private life ==
She and Alfred had two sons Dietrich (1909-2001) who became a doctor and Ulrich (1911-1941) who became a stage designer and who, as an SS guard, died in Stolpovo near Kaluga (in the Soviet Union) during the Russian campaign at the end of 1941.

Mileva has been described, by Brigitte Hamann, as 'an enthusiastically pro-Hitler Serbian'. When Ulrich died on the Moscow front, Winifred Wagner wrote to Mileva, a woman she did not personally know:

The news has just reached me, though I cannot grasp it yet, that your dear son Uli has died a hero's death for his fatherland and his beloved Führer. I bow my head in silent respect for what you, his mother, must be going through...For us it is like losing a dear member of the family. (Bayreuth is in mourning) for the loss of such an extraordinarily gifted artist - whom Wieland had selected to be his eventual collaborator ...Now his young life has been fulfilled, and he died as he lived: believing in the Führer and the National Socialist ideal; believing in the great fatherland of the future. He was faithful unto death, and set a shining example to us all.

In a later statement, the Roller family contradicted Winifred's opinion.

Mileva Roller died in Vienna on 6 May 1949. She was buried in Vienna Central Cemetery.

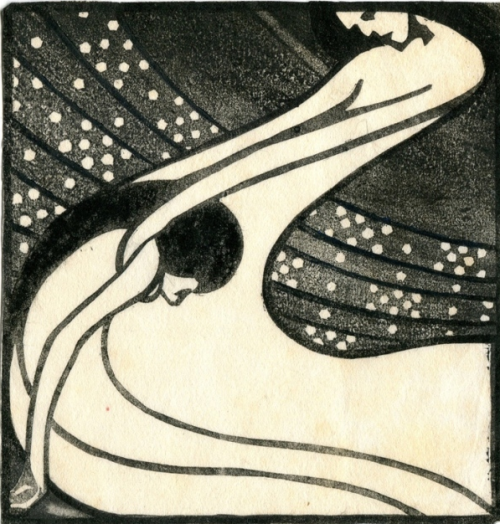
Zwei Frauen

== Legacy ==
Her work was included in the 2019 exhibition City Of Women: Female artists in Vienna from 1900 to 1938 at the Österreichische Galerie Belvedere.
