= Kurt Nachod =

World War 1 soldier who served in the Austro-Hungarian Air Force

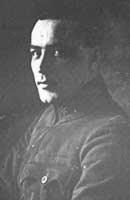
- Born: 8 March 1890; Brno, Austrian Empire now Czech Republic
- Died: 11 May 1918 (aged 28)
- Military career
- Allegiance: Austro-Hungarian Empire
- Branch: Flying service
- Service years: 1915 - 1918
- Rank: Oberleutnant
- Units: Flik 10; Flik 20; Fluggeschwader I
- Conflicts: Battles of the Isonzo
- Awards: Order of the Iron Crown, Military Merit Cross, Military Merit Medal, German Iron Cross

Oberleutnant Kurt Nachod (8 March 1890 – 11 May 1918) served during World War I in the Austro-Hungarian Air Force, in which he was credited with downing five enemy aircraft, ranking him 42nd in the list of Austro-Hungarian flying aces. Unusually, all of these victories were gained while acting as an observer.

When the war began, he was one of those rare mechanically-minded individuals who owned an automobile. He served as a volunteer chauffeur for high-ranking officers and dignitaries until September 1915, before joining the air service. By January 1917, he had become an ace as an observer and began learning to fly. He scored no further victories as a pilot before he died from a night landing accident.

== Early life ==
Kurt Nachod was born 8 March 1890 in Brno, then part of the Austrian Empire, now in the Czech Republic. Born in a wealthy family, he was a proficient linguist, mastering the spoken and written forms of Czech, German, French, Spanish, and English. He served his obligatory military service in an infantry unit. Afterwards, his family provided him with an automobile, and he became renowned as his own mechanic as well as for his driving skill. When World War I began, Nachod volunteered his automobile and services as a driver to the Volunteer Motor Corps, in which capacity he transported high ranking officers during the Serbian campaign. In May 1915, he was given command of an armored train in northern Italy.

== Aviation service ==
In September 1915, Nachod joined the Austro-Hungarian Air Force, and by the following month was flying in combat on the Eastern Front as an observer with "Flik 10", the abbreviation for Fliegerkompany, or squadron number 10. He shifted to nearby "Flik 20" when it was founded in February 1916. Manning the observer's gun in a Knoller-Albatros B.I, he scored forced-to-land victories on 31 May 1916 and 3 July 1916. The latter was gained with a carbine when the observer's machine gun failed. On 20 September 1916, his gunfire forced a third enemy aircraft to land. He repeated the feat twice on 7 January 1917, for his fourth and fifth victories. For his valor, he was rewarded with the Military Merit Cross with War Decorations and Swords, the Silver Military Merit Medal with Swords, and a German Iron Cross, Second Class.

In July 1917, Nachod transferred to the Italian Front, where he served during the Battles of the Isonzo as an observer in a Hansa-Brandenburg C.I from Fluggeschwader I. During this posting, he learned to fly without official training, and managed to qualify for his pilot's certificate. On 9 May 1918, he was practicing night landings when he crashed and died of his injuries two days later. Charles I of Austria later granted him the only posthumous award of the Order of the Iron Crown, Third Class, with War Decorations and Swords for aviators.
