= Krsto Mazarović =

Krsto Mazarović was one of the pioneers of Croatian aviation. He was the first Croat flying in a balloon. His flight took place on 15 December 1789 in Zagreb when he was conducting the first meteorological air pressure measurement in Croatia. His family descended from Croats of Boka Kotorska from the town of Perast, where they are mentioned for the first time in 1334.
