= Franz Wognar =

Austrian-Hungarian World War I flying ace (1890-1943)

- Born: 6 January 1890; Trnava, Austro-Hungarian Empire (present day Slovakia)
- Died: 1943 (aged 52–53); Odessa
- Military career
- Allegiance: Austro-Hungarian Empire
- Branch: Aviation
- Rank: Zugführer
- Unit: Fliegerkompanie 2 Luftfahrtruppen
- Awards: 1 gold and 4 silver awards of Medal for Bravery

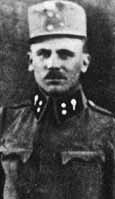
Wognár Ferenc.jpg

Franz Wognar (1890-1943) was an Austrian-Hungarian World War I flying ace credited with five aerial victories. Wognar joined the Austro-Hungarian Armed Forces in 1913 as a trained mechanic. As the war broke out in 1914, he transferred to the Austro-Hungarian Aviation Troops. After pilot training, he was posted to fly two-seater reconnaissance aircraft over the early Battles of the Isonzo in northern Italy. Wognar flew reconnaissance, aerial photo, and artillery direction missions throughout 1916. Between 26 January and 16 September 1917, Wognar would score five victories. His fifth victory, over an Italian observation balloon, was extraordinary because very few pilots succeeded in balloon busting with a two-seater plane. Wognar was reassigned to test pilot duty. He ended the war with one Gold and four Silver awards of the Medal for Bravery.

== Biography ==
Franz Wognar was born in Trnava, in the Austro-Hungarian Empire; due to subsequent changes in national boundaries, his birthplace is in present-day Slovakia. He was of Slovakian heritage. He married a Slovenian woman in 1918. He died in Odessa in 1943.

== Aviation career ==
Wognar trained as a mechanic before enlisting in the Austro-Hungarian Army in 1913. He later transferred to aviation service during the first year of World War I. He was then trained as a pilot and sent into action when Italy entered the war in May 1915.

Wognar was posted for duty with Fliegerkompanie 2 as a pilot of two-seater reconnaissance aircraft in July 1915. He flew with Flik 2 over the Battles of the Isonzo, the main battle front in northwestern Italy. In addition to reconnaissance missions, Wognar flew aerial photography missions and bombing sorties, directed artillery fire, supported ground troops with tactical attacks, escorted friendly bombers to their targets, and flew interceptions of enemy two-seaters. He was especially skilled in directing artillery fire. Although eventually a few single-seat fighters were assigned to Flik 2, Wognar usually still flew two-seaters. Knoller-Albatros B.Is were his usual mounts during 1915.

On 3 October 1915, Wognar was promoted to Zugführer. On 9 October, he was awarded the highly prized Field Pilot's Badge. In February 1916, he received the Silver Bravery Medal Second Class. In June 1916, he received the First Class award of the same medal. By this time, Flik 2s inventory had grown to include Hansa-Brandenburg C.Is and Lloyd C.IIIs for Wognar to fly.

On the morning of 26 January 1917, he and his observer came under attack from an Italian Nieuport fighter; the Austro-Hungarians turned into the attack and drove it down with machine gun fire, for Wognar's first aerial victory. In March 1917, he received another First Class Silver Medal. He scored another victory on 1 May 1917 when he shot down another Nieuport. On 20 May, he was teamed with future ace Franz Graser for a morning patrol. They encountered an Italian SPAD fighter, which they shot down. Wognar was wounded while scoring his third aerial victory, but his back wound did not keep him long from action. He signed himself out of hospital against medical advice after only ten days and returned to duty. He also received Austria-Hungary's supreme award, a Gold Bravery Medal, during May 1917.

On 4 September 1917, Wognar scored his fourth victory. On the 16th, he teamed with a wingman and pulled off a rare feat for two-seater pilots by igniting and destroying an Italian observation balloon. After this fifth aerial victory in a two-seater Hansa-Brandenburg C.I, Wognar was reassigned as a test pilot. He also received a third award of the First Class Silver Bravery Medal. Wognar began his testing career in the last days of 1917, wringing out Gotha G.IV bombers for Fliegerkompanie 101 G and Fliegerkompanie 102 G. During 1918, he would once again be awarded the First Class Silver Medal for Bravery. He would also be appointed an Offizierstellvertreter (Deputy Officer).

== List of aerial victories ==
No.	Date/time	Aircraft	Foe	Result	Location	Notes
1	26 January 1917 before noon	Hansa-Brandenburg C.I serial number 29.75	Italian Nieuport fighter	Forced to land	Saint Florian	
2	1 May 1917 @ 0825 hours	Hansa-Brandenburg C.I s/n 27.64	Italian Nieuport fighter		Monte Sabotino	
3	20 May 1917 @ 0920 hours	Hansa-Brandenburg C.I s/n 229.20	Italian Spad		Monte Sabotino	Observer/gunner: Franz Gräser; Wognar wounded in back
4	4 September 1917	Hansa-Brandenburg C.I s/n 329.07	Italian airplane	Shot down		
5	16 September 1917 in the evening	Hansa-Brandenburg C.I s/n 39.69	Italian Observation balloon	Set afire	Liga	

== See also ==
Aerial victory standards of World War I

== Bibliography ==
- Franks, Norman; Guest, Russell; Alegi, Gregory (1997). Above the War Fronts: The British Two-seater Bomber Pilot and Observer Aces, the British Two-seater Fighter Observer Aces, and the Belgian, Italian, Austro-Hungarian and Russian Fighter Aces, 1914–1918. Grub Street. ISBN 978-1898697565.
- O'Connor, Martin (1994). Air Aces of the Austro-Hungarian Empire 1914 - 1918. Flying Machines Press. ISBN 978-0-9637110-1-4.
