= Johann Risztics =

Austro-Hungarian World War I flying ace

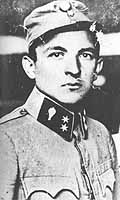
- Johann Risztics
- Born: 11 January 1895; Budapest, Kingdom of Hungary, Austria-Hungary
- Died: March 7, 1973 (aged 78); Duisburg, North Rhine-Wsetphalia, West Germany
- Burial place: Duisburg, Germany
- Military career
- Allegiance: Austro-Hungarian Empire
- Branch: Austro-Hungarian Aviation Troops
- Service years: 1914-1918
- Rank: Stabsfeldwebel
- Nickname: Api
- Units: Fliegerkompanie 22; Fliegerkompanie 42
- Awards: Two Gold and 3 Silver Medals for Bravery
- Other work: Test pilot for Junkers

Stabsfeldwebel Johann Risztics (alias Janos Risztics) (1895-1973) was an Austro-Hungarian World War I flying ace credited with seven reliably confirmed aerial victories. After his wounding early in World War I, he switched to aviation duty as a mechanic. He went for pilot training in 1915. Once trained, he shot down seven enemy fighter planes, winning five Medals for Bravery in the process. Postwar, he became a record-setting test pilot for Junkers.

== In the beginning ==
Johann Risztics (alias János Risztics or Ristic) was born on 11 January 1895 in Budapest, Hungary to South Slav parents. As World War I began, he joined Hungarian Infantry Regiment No. 44. The regiment went into action in the Carpathian Mountains on the Russian Front; Risztics was wounded on 23 November 1914.

== Aviation service ==
Once healed, Risztics joined the Airship Detachment of the Austro-Hungarian Aviation Troops as a mechanic. He subsequently applied for heavier-than-air pilot training and was accepted in July 1915. On 2 December 1915, he was awarded Austrian Pilot Certificate No. 292. Once trained, he returned to the Russian Front in March 1916 to join Fliegerkompanie 22. His service with this general service squadron brought him two awards of the Silver Medal for Bravery, with the Second Class award in August 1916 followed by the First Class award in December. On 10 February 1917, he was promoted to Feldwebel.

In April 1917, he was transferred to Fliegerkompanie 42J as a fighter pilot on the Italian Front. While fighting in the Battles of the Isonzo, he used his Hansa-Brandenburg D.I fighter to shoot down an Italian Nieuport fighter on 30 June 1917 for his unit's first victory. During July and August, he shot down two more Nieuports and an Italian SPAD. By the end of the year, he was an ace.

During this time, Risztics received his second First Class award of the Silver Medal for Bravery in July. In August, he received the more prestigious Gold Bravery Medal. Risztics formed a strong friendship with fellow pilots Fredrich Hefty and Ferdinand Udvardy, as all three of them won the Gold Medal for Bravery. These three awards prompted the airmen of Fliegerkompanie 42J to nickname the trio the Arany Triumviratus (Golden Triumvirate).

Re-equipped with an Albatros D.III fighter, Risztics scored two more victories in 1918, on 17 April and 4 May. Also in May, he received a rare second award of the Gold Medal for Bravery. Shortly thereafter, as he began to show signs of combat fatigue, he was pulled from combat duty to become an instructor for the remainder of the war.

== Post World War I military service ==
As the Austro-Hungarian Empire dissolved into smaller nations, Risztics elected for Hungarian citizenship. In 1919, in defense of his new nation, he served with the 8th Fighter Squadron, Red Air Force during the ongoing turmoil post World War I.

== Civilian test pilot ==
Risztics next became a test pilot for Junkers.

=== World Record Flights of the W33 ===
In the late 1920s, he was well known for his record flights for the Junkers W 33.

On July 5, 1927, Junkers pilots Risztics and Zimmermann achieved a new world record for continuous flight with a W33L of 65hrs and 25 minutes.

Risztics and Edzard achieved the next W33 world record on August 3, 1927, with a W33. They flew for a distance of 4660 km a new distance world record, and needed 52hrs and 22 minutes for that flight.

=== First try of the east-west Atlantic crossing ===
On August, 14th 1927, Risztics, Edzard and the American journalist Hubert Renfro Knickerbocker on board the Junkers W 33 "Europa", and Koehl, Loose and Huenefeld with the W 33 "Bremen", took off from Germany for the first approach of the crossing. This approach failed due to bad weather and engine troubles of "Europa".

=== The Challenge 1929-1930 ===
Risztics took part at International Touring Aircraft Contests, the Challenge 1929 and the Challenge 1930. The contest was conceived by the French Aero Club, inspired by the International Light Aircraft Contest in France in 1928. Four Challenges, from 1929 to 1934, were major aviation events in pre-war Europe.

The first contest was opened on August 4, 1929, in Paris. It consisted of two parts: technical trials of aircraft and a rally over Europe. Since one of the aims of the Challenge was to generate a progress in aircraft building, it was not only pilots' competition, but technical trials also included a construction evaluation.

Fifty-five aircraft entered the Challenge in 1929, from six countries. All planes flew with two-men crews, pilot and passenger or mechanic.

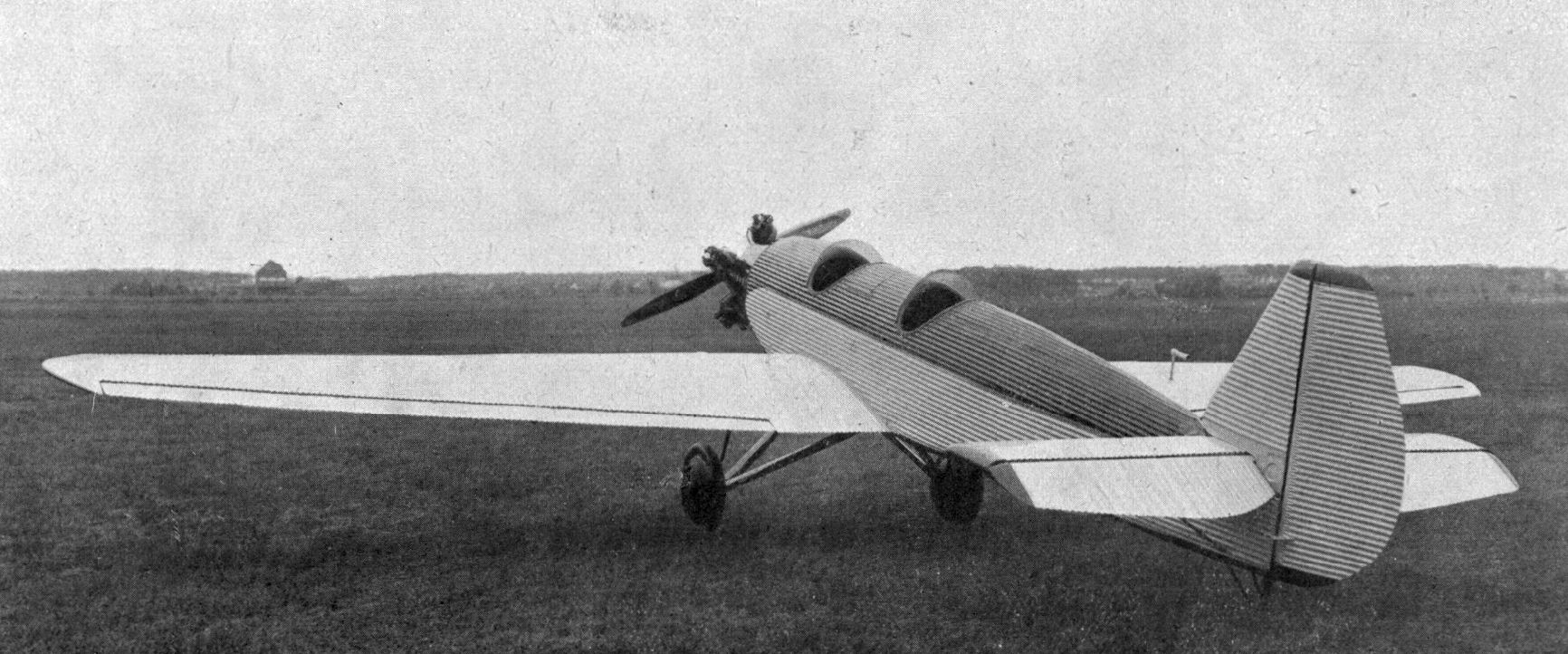
A Junkers A50, July, 1929.

Johann Risztics was 8th after the technical trials with his Junkers A50. However, just at the beginning of a rally over Europe, on 7 August 1929, he broke the undercarriage and the propeller and was disqualified. He continued the rally off the contest, until Milan.

The second Challenge took place between July 16 and August 8, 1930, and started in Berlin, Germany.

Germany organized the contest, because the German pilot Fritz Morzik won the previous contest in 1929. Sixty aircraft entered the Challenge in 1930, from six countries.

The contest was open on July 16, 1930, at Berlin-Staaken airfield. It consisted of two parts: a rally over Europe and technical trials.

Risztics finished the rally in 16th position and overall in 15th position, flying Junkers A50ce.

== Death ==
Johann Risztics died in Duisburg, West Germany on 7 March 1973.

== See also ==
- List of World War I flying aces from Hungary
- List of World War I aces credited with 7 victories
