= Franz Peter =

Austrian flying ace (1896–1968)

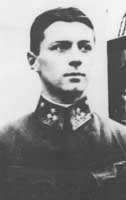
- Franz Peter
- Born: 8 October 1896; Vienna, Austria
- Died: 1968 (aged 71–72); Warsaw, Poland
- Military career
- Allegiance: Austria-Hungary
- Branch: Austro-Hungarian Aviation Troops
- Rank: Oberleutnant
- Units: Flik 14; Flik 47F; Flik 3J
- Awards: Order of the Iron Crown (3rd Class with War Decoration and Swords); Military Merit Cross (3rd Class with War Decoration and Swords); Medal for Bravery (One 2nd Class in Silver, and two 1st Class in Silver); Military Merit Medal (Silver and Bronze)

Franz Peter (8 October 1896 – 1968) was an Austrian flying ace credited with six aerial victories in World War I while flying for Austria-Hungary's Imperial and Royal Aviation Troops.

== World War I service ==
At the outbreak of the Great War Peter joined the Austro-Hungarian Army and served on the Eastern Front. In late 1915 he volunteered for the Air Service as an aircraft observer. After finishing training school in late January 1916 he was posted to the Eastern Front unit Fliegerkompanie 14 (Flik 14) (Note: Flik = Fliegerkompanie, a basic Air Force unit of Squadron size. The average Flik was often understaffed, numbering on average 8 pilots.) as an observer. During the next two years of service he received several awards and was promoted to oberleutnant on 1 November 1917.

After brief service with Fliegerkompanie 47F (Flik 47F), (Note: Flik with 'F' = 'F' for Fernaufklärerkompanie was the designation for a Long Range Reconnaissance unit.) he applied for pilot training and was accepted in March 1918. After completing further training as a fighter pilot he was posted to Fliegerkompanie 3J (Flik 3J) (Note: Flik with'J' = 'J' denoted Jagdfliegerkompanie which was composed of dedicated Fighter aircraft.) at Romagnano in May 1918 where he flew the Albatros D.III fighter. He scored his first and second confirmed victories on July 16 when he downed two Italian Hanriot fighters over Concei. Peter scored his sixth and last confirmed victory on October 7 when he shot down a Sopwith Camel of 66 Squadron, Royal Air Force.

== Post-war ==
After World War I, Peter decided to join the Polish Air Force, encouraged by Stefan Stec, with whom he had served during the war. He fought during the Polish-Ukrainian War and Polish-Soviet War from 1919, flying as a pilot of two-seater reconnaissance machines, in strafing and bombing missions. Between February and March 1920 he commanded the 6th Reconnaissance Escadre, near Ternopil. He was wounded during this posting.

After these wars, he settled in Poland, working in aerospace industry, especially in the field of engine design. As Europe was sucked into World War II, he moved to Romania, then to France. When the Germans overran France, he was returned to Warsaw. Given the choice of prison or factory work, he survived the war performing the latter.
