= Friedrich Hefty =

Austro-Hungarian flying ace

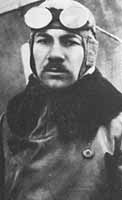
- Born: 13 December 1894; Pozsony, Austro-Hungarian Monarchy
- Died: 20 January 1965 (aged 70); Detroit, Michigan, United States
- Military career
- Allegiance: Austro-Hungarian Empire
- Branch: Austro-Hungarian Aviation Troops
- Rank: Offiziersstellvertreter (officer candidate)
- Units: Flik 12, Flik 44F, Flik 42J
- Awards: Three Bronze awards, two each of the First and Second classes of the Silver award, and three awards of the Gold Medal for Bravery (ten awards total); Order of Vitéz
- Other work: Airline pilot; WWII service

Friedrich Hefty (13 December 1894 – 20 January 1965), also referred to as Frigyes Hefty, was a World War I Austro-Hungarian flying ace credited with five confirmed and five unconfirmed aerial victories. His early interest in aviation led him to drop out of school in 1913 and become a glider pilot. When World War I began, he served first as an aerial observer, then as a pilot. He scored his first aerial victory as an observer, on 7 October 1915. Once he became a pilot, he claimed nine other victories, four of which were verified. On 22 August 1918, he became one of the first combat pilots to bail out using a parachute. Hefty ended the war with ten awards of the Medal for Bravery.

After a short stint in the Hungarian Red Air Arm, Hefty settled into a civil aviation career. He was a pioneering pilot for Malev and Air France; he also ran flying clubs in both Hungary and Cairo, as well as gliding clubs elsewhere. After serving as an administrator in World War II, he fled communist domination of Hungary. He became an American citizen, eventually dying in Detroit, Michigan.

== Early life ==
Friedrich Hefty (also referred to as Frigyes Hefty) was born on 13 December 1894 in Pozsony, Austria-Hungary (present-day Bratislava, Slovak Republic). Although entitled to be addressed as Count, he eschewed the term. In his youth, he began to spend considerable time with aviation pioneers on the outskirts of Budapest. He found aviation so absorbing that he quit high school a year before graduation to devote his full attention to flying. In 1913, he tried his first flight, in a glider.

== Aviation service ==
When World War I began, Hefty elected to join the Austro-Hungarian Aviation Troops. In May 1915, he was posted to Flik 12 in northern Italy; he flew Albatros, Lohner, and Hansa-Brandenburg two-seaters during the Battles of the Isonzo. As was customary, he had to complete 12 combat sorties before being awarded his pilot's badge on 2 July 1915.

On 7 October, both Hefty and his observer were wounded by antiaircraft fire while on an artillery spotting mission. Overcoming a foot wound, Hefty got his seriously wounded observer home via crash landing, and they reported to hospital. Soon after Hefty emerged from care, he returned in December with a three-week case of typhus.

Hefty would be detached from Flik 12 for test pilot duties in autumn 1916, but returned to the squadron after several months. He would be transferred in April 1917, posted to fly long-range reconnaissance sorties with Flik 44F on the Romanian Front. He scored his first victory on 23 August 1917.

Transferred to Flik 42J in October 1917, he flew fighters in the Battle of Caporetto. He scored his second victory on 27 October 1917, flying an Aviatik D.I. Thereafter, he flew an Albatros D.III. Often he flew with two other winners of the Gold Medal for Bravery, aces Ferdinand Udvardy and Johann Risztics. Hefty would stake a combat claim on 17 April 1918, followed by seven more in June 1918. While Hefty garnered five credited victories, five more went unconfirmed.

On 22 August 1918, for the first time, Hefty was ordered to fly with a parachute. When he was shot down in flames that day, he successfully bailed out, spraining an ankle.

By war's end, Friedrich Hefty had received ten awards of the Medal for Bravery. He won three Bronze awards, two each of the Second and First Classes of the Silver award, and three awards of the most prestigious, the Gold Medal for Bravery. He was also proposed as a Offiziersstellvertreter (officer candidate). However, he was denied commissioning as an officer because he lacked the last year of high school that he had skipped because of his interest in aviation.

== List of victories ==
No.	Date	Foe	Location
1	23 August 1917	Farman	Târgu Ocna
2	27 October 1917	Enemy aircraft	Lake Doberdò
Unconfirmed	4 April 1918	Enemy aircraft	Montello
3	17 April 1918	Sopwith Camel	Montello
Unconfirmed	16 June 1918	Nieuport fighter	Montello
Unconfirmed	17 June 1918	Caproni	Montello
4	20 June 1918	British two-seater	Susegana
5	20 June 1918	Two-seater	Montello
Unconfirmed	22 June 1918	Hanriot HD.1	Spresiano
Unconfirmed	22 June 1918	Nieuport fighter	Montello

== Post World War I ==
As low-level fighting continued immediately after war's end, Hefty flew for the Hungarian Red Air Arm, fighting units of Czechs, Romanians, and Serbs. He was captured on 1 July 1919 when his Fokker D.VII was damaged and forced to land near the Tisza river. He was later released and awarded the Order of Vitéz.

Following that, Hefty made his life in aviation. He was a commercial pilot for Malert Airlines and Air France for the next two decades. He also founded and advised gliding and flying clubs worldwide. He founded the Ikaros Flying School in Hungary, and another flying school in Cairo.

== World War II and beyond ==
During World War II, Friedrich Hefty served as an administrative officer in the Hungarian Air Force until captured by Americans. Once released, he returned to Hungary, only to resent obtrusive communist domination. He emigrated to Detroit to continue as an aviation enthusiast. He died there on 20 January 1965.
