= Josef Friedrich =

World War I flying ace (born in 1893)

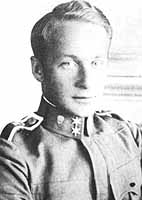
- Josef Friedrich in 1918
- Born: 12 September 1893; Cvikov, Bohemia, Austria-Hungary
- Died: Unknown
- Military career
- Allegiance: Austro-Hungarian Empire
- Branch: Aviation
- Rank: Oberleutnant
- Units: Flik 16, Flik 24
- Awards: 2 awards of the Military Merit Cross, Military Merit Medal

Oberleutnant Josef Friedrich (18 September 1893 – ?) was a Czech fighter pilot. He was a World War I flying ace credited with seven aerial victories. He was born in Cvikov, Bohemia. He scored most of his victories while flying as an observer with Raoul Stojsavljevic.

== Sources ==
- Franks, Norman; Guest, Russell; Alegi, Gregory (1997). Above the War Fronts: The British Two-seater Bomber Pilot and Observer Aces, the British Two-seater Fighter Observer Aces, and the Belgian, Italian, Austro-Hungarian and Russian Fighter Aces, 1914–1918. Grub Street. ISBN 978-1898697565.
- O'Connor, Martin (1994). Air Aces of the Austro-Hungarian Empire 1914 - 1918. Flying Machines Press. ISBN 978-0-9637110-1-4.
