= Franz Gräser =

Austro-Hungarian World War I flying ace

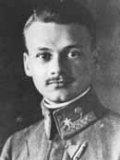
- Born: 26 October 1892; Nyírmada, Hungary
- Died: 17 May 1918 (aged 25); Treviso
- Military career
- Allegiance: Austro-Hungarian Empire
- Branch: Aviation
- Rank: Leutnant
- Units: Flik 2, Flik 32, Flik 42J, Flik 61J
- Awards: Order of the Iron Crown, Order of Leopold, Silver Medal for Bravery

Leutnant Franz Gräser (1892–1918) was an Austro-Hungarian World War I flying ace credited with 18 aerial victories. Initially commander of a machine gun unit, he transferred to aviation as an observer. Remarkably, he learned to fly without going through aviation training. Coached by a friendly pilot, he became a fighter pilot without a pilot's license. He would be credited with 18 victories before dying in a flaming shootdown.

== Biography ==
Gräser was a technical university student in Budapest until World War I broke out. In October 1914, he enlisted in Infanterieregiment No. 72, graduated reserve officer school in mid-July 1915, and began World War I as the commander of a machine gun unit on the Russian Front. After being wounded, he transferred to K.u.K, the Austro-Hungarian air service. He was commissioned as an officer and assigned to observer duties in the rear seat of a reconnaissance aircraft in Flik 2. His skill with machine guns helped him to his first two victories, from the rear seat, on 10 February and 20 May 1917.

Like many observers, Gräser made the transition to becoming a pilot. Unlike just about anyone else, he did so without formal training. The feldwebel pilot who coached him thought he was a natural, but he never received any official training. Without ever being licensed as a pilot, Gräser began flying an Albatros D.III fighter for Flik 42J beginning in September 1917. His personal insignia of an owl on his plane was based in Baltic culture; an owl was considered a sign of death. By the end of 1917, his score stood at 11, with number 11 being claimed on 5 December 1917.

He resumed his victory roll on 26 January 1918 with Flik 61J. By the 23rd of March, he had run his total of wins up to 18 confirmed and one unconfirmed. Most of his victories were over Italian pilots, and his range of victims was wide; seaplanes, fighters, recon two-seaters, and balloons all fell before his guns.

On 17 May 1918, Gräser flew an escort mission, and was shot down in flames by several Italian aces, including Guido Nardini, Francesco Baracca, Antonio Chiri, Cesare Magistrini, and Gastone Novelli.

== Sources of information ==
(According to Osprey Aircraft Aces No. 89, Italian Aces WWI, F. Baracca and A. Chiri did not engage and were not involved in this aerial encounter on May 17, 1918)

== See also ==
List of World War I flying aces from Hungary
