= Heinrich Kostrba =

Austro-Hungarian aviator (of Czech origin)

Jindřich Kostrba
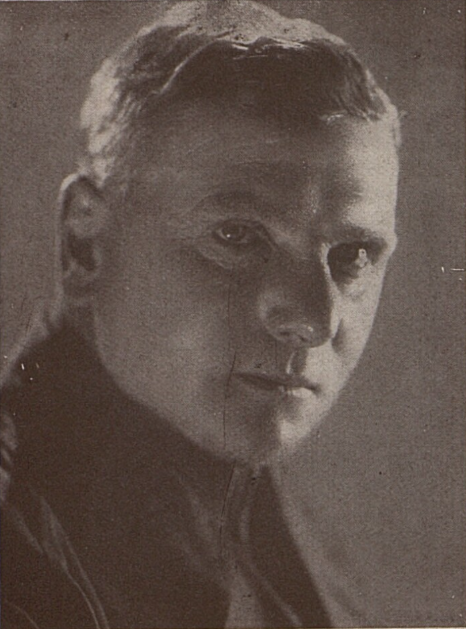
- Heinrich (Jindřich) Kostrba (c. 1927)
- Born: October 22, 1883; Kutná Hora, Bohemia, Austria-Hungary
- Died: September 24, 1926 (aged 42); Prague, Czechoslovakia
- Military career
- Allegiance: Austro-Hungarian Empire; Czechoslovakia
- Branch: Aviation
- Rank: Hauptmann
- Units: Flik 8; Flik 4
- Commands: Flik 23; Fliegerersatzkompanie 2; Prague Military Police; Czechoslovak Air Force
- Awards: Military Merit Cross 3rd Class, German Iron Cross
- Other work: Founder and first Commanding Officer of Czechoslovak Air Force

Hauptmann Heinrich (Jindřich) Kostrba was an Austro-Hungarian aviator (of Czech origin), the first which to score three victories in a single day, on 18 February 1916, and three more on 29 June 1916. He went on to amass eight aerial victories and become a squadron leader and flying ace.

As World War I ended, Kostrbra helped the Czech independence movement overthrow the Austro-Hungarian government. He became the first commanding officer of the Czechoslovak Air Force. On 24 September 1926, he was killed in a midair collision.

== Early life and service ==
Heinrich (Jindřich) Kostrba was born in Kutná Hora in 1883. His family was ancient Bohemian minor nobility, the titular surname being Kostrba ze Skalice. Kostrba joined the Austro-Hungarian Army's 73rd Infantry Regiment in 1903. By 1911, he had risen to oberleutnant by May 1911. His early interest in aviation saw him qualify as an aerial observer even before the start of World War I.

== World War I service ==
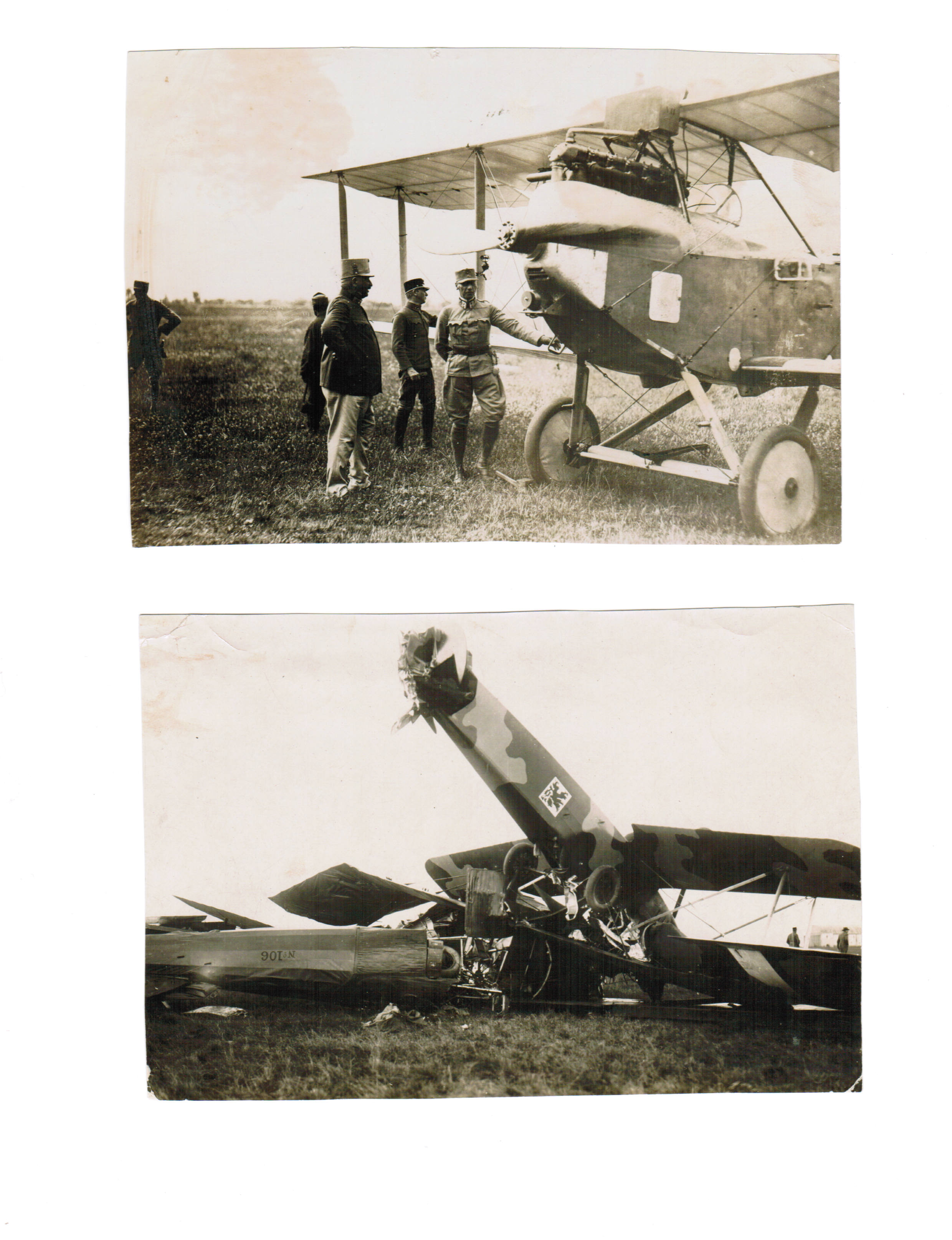

Kostrba accompanied Flik 8 of the Imperial and Royal Aviation Troops into combat in Russia in 1914. He quickly won the Military Merit Cross 3rd Class, as well as the German Iron Cross 2nd class. He was also promoted to Hauptmann in May 1915.

In July 1915, Kostrba was transferred to Flik 4 on the Isonzo Front in northern Italy. He trained there as a pilot, qualifying in October 1915. He then served as both deputy commander and pilot in Flik 4, flying both Hansa-Brandenburg C.I two-seater reconnaissance planes and a Fokker Eindekker. On 18 February 1916, using Fokker Eindekker serial number 03.51, he scored three confirmed victories, though two were shared with other pilots.

In March 1916, Kostrba was granted command of Flik 23. Here he would fly only the Hansa-Brandenburg C.I, but would score five additional confirmed aerial victories between 7 June and 20 August 1916. In November 1916, he was transferred to command of Fliegerersatzkompanie 2.

In late 1918, as the war was winding into its finale, Kostrba was appointed to command of Prague's Military Police. The connection between impending war's end and his appointment to this new command are unclear. However, when General Kestranek was arrested by the Czechs to overthrow the Austro-Hungarian government, it was Kostrbra who sent Hungarian and Romanian troops back to their barracks instead of letting them repress the coup.

== Postwar service ==
Within a few days after the 28 October 1918 Czech proclamation of independence, Kostrbra was recruiting pilots for the nascent Czech Army Air Corps. He became its first commanding officer. He was removed from command after a year's service, although not for deficiencies in military skills. Kostrbra had both a personality conflict and ideological differences with Foreign Minister Edvard Beneš which led to dismissal.

In 1921, Kostrbra returned to the Czech Army Air Corps as a squadron leader. In September 1926, he was in the process of resigning from the military to pursue a career with the Czech state airline. However, about a week before his resignation took effect, he was assigned to lead a formation of Yugoslavian pilots from Prague to Warsaw on 24 September. Another plane fatally collided with him during formation takeoff at an altitude of about 30 feet (nine meters). On 28 September 1926, Heinrich (Jindřich) Kostrba was honored with a funeral cortege through the streets of Prague; his coffin was displayed atop an airplane fuselage during the procession.
