= Béla Macourek =

Austro-Hungarian World War I flying ace

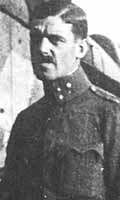
- Born: 4 November 1889; Pozsony, Austro-Hungary (now Bratislava, Slovak Republic)
- Died: Unknown
- Military career
- Allegiance: Austro-Hungarian Empire
- Branch: Artillery, then flying service
- Service years: 1914 - 1918
- Rank: Oberleutnant
- Units: Flik 23, Flik 6, Flik 1
- Awards: Military Merit Cross, Military Merit Medal, Hungarian Order of the Brave (1921), Hungarian Gold Bravery Medal for officers (1931)
- Other work: Hungarian civil servant

Oberleutnant Béla Macourek (born 4 November 1889, date of death unknown) was an Austro-Hungarian World War I flying ace credited with five aerial victories. He entered the First World War as a mounted artillery officer. Two years campaigning brought him a Bronze Military Merit Medal. In mid-1916, he volunteered as an aerial observer. Over the next two years, he would progress to pilot, deputy commander, then commander while destroying five enemy airplanes. He was awarded the Silver Military Merit Medal and the Military Merit Cross.

Postwar, he served in the Hungarian civil service and changed his surname to Maklary. In 1921, he was a founding member of the Order of the Brave. In 1931, he received a belated Gold Bravery Medal for his wartime exploits.

== Early life ==
Béla Macourek was born to Moravian and Hungarian parents on 4 February 1889. His birthplace was then known as Nebojsza, county Pozsony; today it is Bratislava, Slovakia.

== Service in the artillery ==
Macourek was commissioned as an officer in Royal Hungarian Mounted Artillery Division No. 1 when World War I began in 1914. He went immediately into battle for two years. For his considerable fighting experience, he was awarded the Bronze Military Merit Medal.

== Aerial service ==
In mid-1916, Macourek volunteered for training as an aerial observer. Finishing in December, he was subsequently stationed with Flik 23 on the Italian Front. On 29 April 1917, Macourek finally qualified for his observer's badge. He shot down an Italian SPAD VII on 21 May 1917. For his prowess as an observer, he was awarded the Silver Military Merit Medal with Swords and the Military Merit Cross Third Class with War Decorations and Swords.

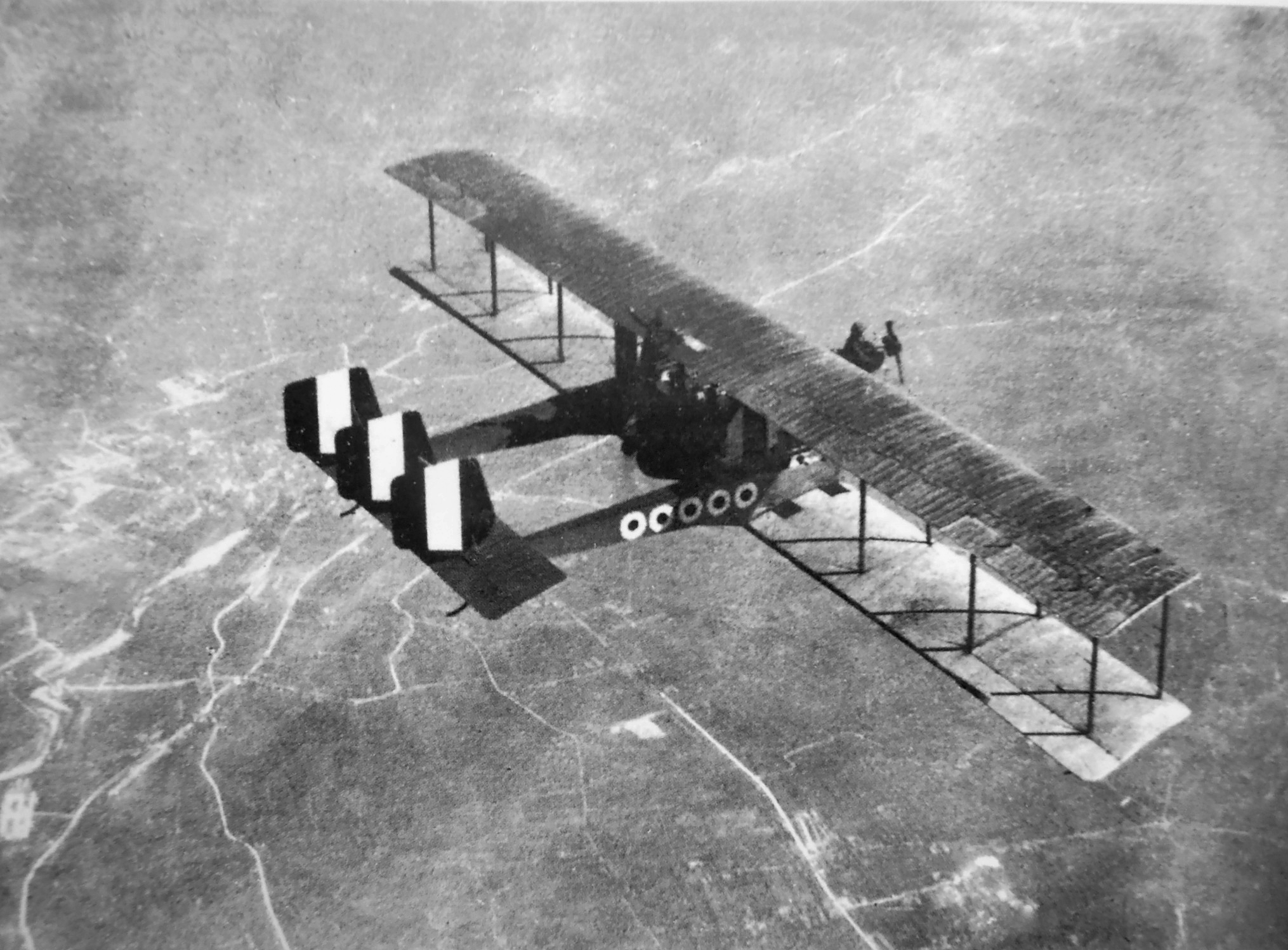
Caproni Ca.3 in flight

Macourek asked for, and got, pilot training. When qualified, he was posted to Flik 6 in Albania in mid-October 1917 as deputy commander. He flew an active schedule there. On the morning of 6 July 1918, first he shot down an Airco DH.9, then set afire a four place Italian Caproni Ca.3, killing its air crew.

During his service with Flik 6, Macourek was repeatedly unsuccessfully nominated for awards of the Order of the Iron Crown, the Order of Leopold, and the Gold Bravery Medal for Officers.

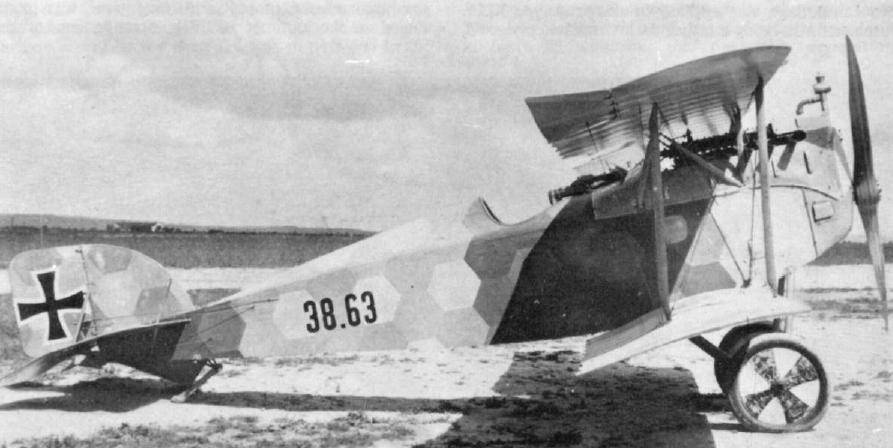
An Aviatik D.I fighter

In late July 1918, he was picked to command Flik 1J. While defending the naval base at Cattaro, Macourek and Julius Arigi shot down an Airco DH.4 at 0810 hours on 23 August 1918. The flaming British bomber fell into the Adriatic Sea. At 0945 hours on 6 September 1918, Macourek shot down another Airco DH.4 into the Adriatic in flames to become an ace. By this time, Macourek was expressing his nationalist political views via his Aviatik D.I fighter; it bore oblique fuselage stripes in the Hungarian national colors of red, white, and green.

== Post World War I ==
The dissolving Austro-Hungarian Empire was being invaded by Serbians, Czechs, and Romanians in the postwar European chaos of 1919. Macourek served with the Red Army Corps battling the invaders.

Later, Béla Macourek chose Hungarian residency and Hungarian citizenship, changing his name to Béla Maklary in the process. He joined the civil service in Hungary. In 1921, he was inducted into the Order of the Brave as one of the founding members. Belatedly, in 1931, his wartime service was honored by the Military Order of Maria Theresa by the award of the Gold Bravery Medal for Officers.
