= Raoul Stojsavljevic =

Austro-Hungarian World War I flying ace

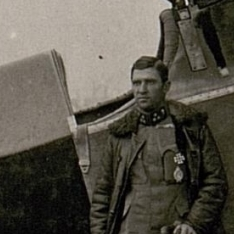
- Born: 28 July 1887; Innsbruck, County of Tyrol, Austro-Hungarian Empire
- Died: 2 September 1930 (aged 43); North of Partenkirchen, Bavaria, Germany
- Burial place: Innsbruck, Austria
- Military career
- Allegiance: Austria-Hungary
- Branch: K.u.K.
- Service years: 1908 - 1925
- Rank: Major
- Units: Fliegerkompanie 1, Fliegerkompanie 13, Fliegerkompanie 17, Fliegerkompanie 16, Fliegerkompanie 34, Fliegerkompanie 6, Fliegerkompanie 1,
- Commands: Fliegerkompanie 16
- Awards: Order of Leopold, Order of the Iron Crown, Military Merit Cross, Gold Medal for Bravery, Iron Cross

Raoul Stojsavljevic (28 July 1887 – 2 September 1930) was an Austro-Hungarian World War I flying ace credited with ten aerial victories. His later career took him to postwar service in aviation both military and civilian. His older sister was the painter Mileva Roller and her husband was the artist Alfred Roller (1864–1935).

== Pre-World War I ==
Stojsavljevic was born to an ethnically mixed marriage in Innsbruck, his father being a Serb from Velika Popina in Croatia, his mother, Adelheid Hohenauer, being Austrian. His elder sister Mileva became a noted artist. He attended a military middle school before he graduated from the Theresian Military Academy on 18 August 1908 and commissioned a leutnant in Feldjaegerbataillon No. 21. By 1911, in addition to his duties as a company officer, he was a corps ski instructor. In 1913, he transferred into aviation. On 13 April, he began pilot's training. The First of May brought a promotion to Oberleutnant. On 2 July, he qualified as a pilot with Austrian certificate 114. On 14 October 1913, he participated in the first flight over the Alps from Vienna to Gorizia. Stojsavljevic's appointment as a field pilot followed on 7 April 1914. On outbreak of war, he was in Flik 1, stationed on the northeastern front in Galicia.

== World War I ==
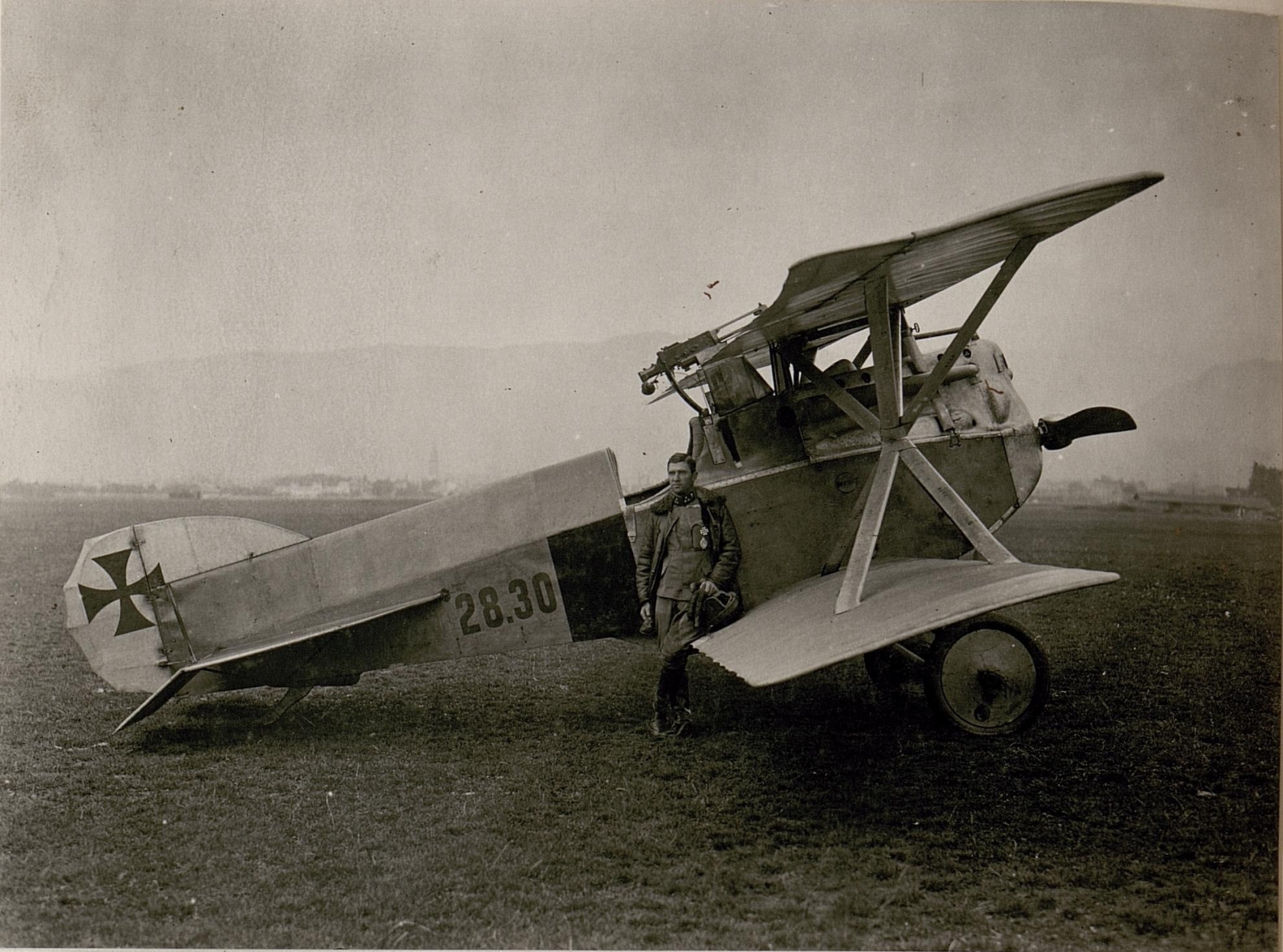
Stojsavljevic in front of his Hansa-Brandenburg D.I fighter in 1917.

While spending a period gaining experience flying reconnaissance for Flik 1, he survived a landing accident on 31 July 1914. He was awarded the Bronze Military Merit Medal on 11 September 1914. He was then assigned to Flik 13 as a recce pilot, senior pilot, and second in command in late November 1914. It was while flying his 49th sortie that he was brought down by a snow storm and captured by the Russians on 16 February 1915. He and his observer had managed to burn their plane; on the 22nd, they escaped. They spent the next two months dodging the Russians, finally repatriating themselves upon the successful Austro-Hungarian Gorlice-Tarnów Offensive capture of Lemberg on 22 June. While amongst the missing, Stojsavljevic was awarded the Iron Cross Second Class on 28 May 1915. The Military Merit Cross followed on 19 July 1915.

Stojsavljevic was then transferred to the Italian Front to serve with Flik 17. He was promoted to Hauptmann on 1 September 1915, and transferred to Flik 17. He was appointed to its command in December. He led the squadron in its mission of flying reconnaissance missions with Hansa-Brandenburg C.Is, and won the Order of the Iron Crown on 20 June 1916. From 4 July through 1 September 1916, he managed to win four victories, three while teamed with Josef Friedrich. He then requested permission to train as a fighter pilot.

As a result, Stojsavljevic was attached to Flik 34, which operated the Hansa-Brandenburg D.I fighter. Although he mastered the H-D, it was at the cost of a lingering knee injury suffered during a landing accident. Still, he managed to become an ace flying an H-D, on 13 February 1917. At the end of his two months, he returned to Flik 16 and his C.I, and downed his sixth Farman on 17 April. He gained further experience and training in fighter tactics with Jagdstaffel 6 on the Western Front during May 1917, though he scored no victories there.

Upon his return to Italy and Flik 16, Stojsavljevic pioneered high-speed photo reconnaissance in a D.I. In the process, he scored triumphs over two more Farmans, on 14 and 23 July 1917. He scored his last victory with a D.I on 7 September 1917. He switched to an Albatros D.III for his final victory on 21 November 1917.

On 12 January 1918, while flying a recce mission in a C.I, Stojsavljevic was shot down with a thigh broken by an enemy bullet inflicted in combat with aircraft from No. 66 Squadron RFC near Seren. He managed to crash-land behind his own lines. While he was recuperating, he was awarded the Gold Medal for Bravery for officers on 18 April. The medical prediction was that he would never walk again without the aid of a stick, but he struggled back to health by October 1918. He was appointed to command his old alma mater, the officers' school in Wiener-Neustadt.

== Post World War I ==
Upon the dissolution of the Austro-Hungarian Empire, Stojsavljevic declined Yugoslavian citizenship and became an Austrian. He served in the Volkswehr and Flugpolizei until 1921. He made an attempt to start commercial air service between Vienna and Budapest, but was closed down by the Allied Control Commission. He returned to Feldjaegerbataillon No. 21 as a major in 1922. In 1925, he founded and directed the new Innsbruck airport. In 1927, he founded a commercial airline; the following year, he joined the pioneering airline ÖLAG.

On 2 September 1930, he flew a Junkers F.13 through thick fog into the Krottenkopf mountain. He was buried with full honors.
