= Miroslav Navratil =

Croatian army general

Miroslav (Friedrich) Navratil
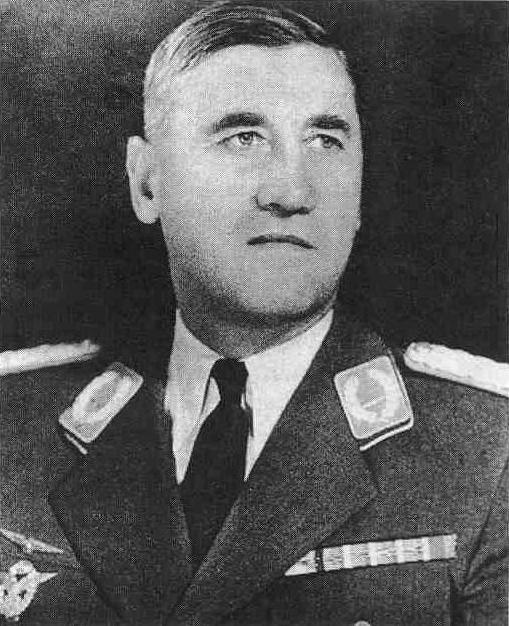
- Born: 19 July 1893; Sarajevo, Bosnia-Herzegovina, Austria-Hungary
- Died: 7 June 1947 (aged 53); Zagreb, PR Croatia, FPR Yugoslavia
- Military career
- Allegiance: Austria-Hungary (until 1918) Yugoslavia (1918–1941) Croatia (1941–1945)
- Branch: Aviation
- Rank: General
- Unit: Flik 41J
- Commands: Flik 3J
- Conflicts: World War I; World War II; Yugoslav Front
- Other work: Minister of Armed Forces of the Independent State of Croatia

Miroslav (Friedrich) Navratil (19 July 1893 – 7 June 1947) was a Croatian army general who served in the armies of Austria-Hungary, the Kingdom of Yugoslavia, and the Independent State of Croatia.

== Until the end of World War I ==
Navratil was born in Sarajevo in the Condominium of Bosnia and Herzegovina. He attended high school in Sarajevo, and finished cadet's school in Graz. In World War I he served in the Austro-Hungarian Armed Forces, as a fighter pilot in the Imperial and Royal Aviation Troops. While on the Eastern and Italian fronts, he scored a victory with Flik 41J on 14 April 1918, before assuming command of Flik 3J on 9 June 1918. Flying Albatros D.IIIs, he scored nine more victories.

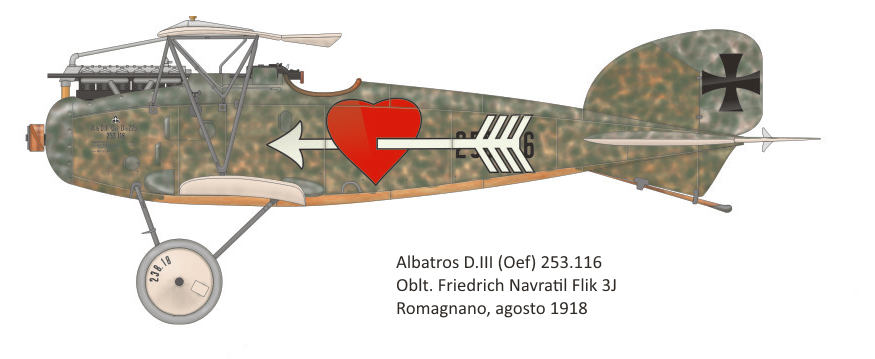
The Albatros DIII flown by Navratil in August 1918.

He attained the rank of Oberleutnant. His victory string ran until 31 August, when he downed a Bristol F.2 Fighter, but lost all four of his inexperienced wingmen in the process. Navratil blamed himself for their loss. He largely removed himself from combat operations. On 21 October, during a test flight of an Albatros D.III, his seat broke, and he was injured in the resultant crash landing. He did not recover before the Armistice.

== Between the World Wars ==
In 1918, Austria-Hungary dissolved and Navratil moved to the newly formed Kingdom of Serbs, Croats and Slovenes, where he took on a position in the royal army. He rose to the rank of colonel, but was eventually retired from the army in 1940 because of conflict with Serb officers within its ranks.

== World War II ==
With the establishment of the Independent State of Croatia on 10 April 1941 Navratil was brought back into active service. He was named as a military representative in Bucharest. He served as minister of the armed forces from 2 September 1943 to 29 January 1944. After he was relieved of his post, reportedly due to complaints about the brutality of the government, he traveled to Vienna, where his family was located and remained there until the end of World War II. In 1945 he moved to Zell am See, where he lived until he was located by American troops in 1946. He was extradited to communist Yugoslavia in December 1946. In Zagreb he was sentenced to death on charge of war crimes, and executed on 7 June 1947.

== Awards ==
- Order of the Crown of King Zvonimir with Swords - September 1943

== Notes ==
Government offices
Preceded by Vilko Begić	Minister of the Armed Forces of the Independent State of Croatia; 1943–1944	Succeeded by Ante Vokić
