= Johann Lasi =

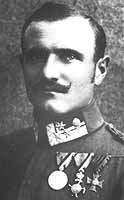
- Born: 1885 or 1890; Kać, Bács-Bodrog, Hungary, Austria-Hungary (now Serbia)
- Died: Unknown
- Military career
- Allegiance: Austria-Hungary
- Branch: Aviation
- Rank: Stabfeldwebel
- Unit: Flik 6
- Awards: Silver Bravery Medal; Silver Merit Cross
- Other work: Instructor

Stabfeldwebel Johann Lasi (born 1890, date of death unknown) was a World War I Austro-Hungarian flying ace, a Croat by ethnicity, credited with five aerial victories on 22 Aug 1916, while acting as an unauthorized rear gunner for Julius Arigi.

== Biography ==
Johann Lasi was born in Kać, Bács-Bodrog, Hungary, Austria-Hungary (present day Serbia) in 1890. After completing school, he trained as a wheelwright. Lasi was fluent in German, Hungarian, and Serbo-Croatian.

In 1911, he joined the Austro-Hungarian Army, then requested transfer to the Airship Section. As World War I began in 1914, Lasi became the chief mechanic for a new airplane squadron, Flik 6. On 22 August 1916, a formation of six Italian Farman two-seaters attacked the naval air station at Durazzo. Julius Arigi of Flik 6 was poised in his Hansa-Brandenburg C.I to intercept the enemy formation, but could not find an observer. By regulation, only an officer could man the rear gun, but Arigi could not find one that day, and asked 25-year-old Lasi to fly with him. The unauthorized gunner was credited with shooting down five of the six attackers, becoming an ace in a day (although the Italians reported only two losses that day). This action garnered him a Silver Medal for Bravery to add to his previously awarded Silver Military Merit Cross with Swords.

Shortly afterwards, Lasi went for pilot training, and ended up as an instructor for the rest of the war.

== Sources ==
- Franks, Norman; Guest, Russell; Alegi, Gregory (1997). Above the War Fronts: The British Two-seater Bomber Pilot and Observer Aces, the British Two-seater Fighter Observer Aces, and the Belgian, Italian, Austro-Hungarian and Russian Fighter Aces, 1914–1918. Grub Street. ISBN 978-1898697565.
- Guttman, Jon (2015). Reconnaissance and Bomber Aces of World War 1. illustrated by Harry Dempsey and Mark Postlethwaite. Osprey Publishing. ISBN 978-1782008019.
- O'Connor, Martin (1995). Air Aces of the Austro-Hungarian Empire 1914 - 1918. Flying Machines Press. ISBN 978-0-9637110-1-4.
