= Order of the Iron Crown (Kingdom of Italy) =

Order of merit in the Napoleonic Kingdom of Italy

Order of the Iron Crown Ordine della Corona Ferrea
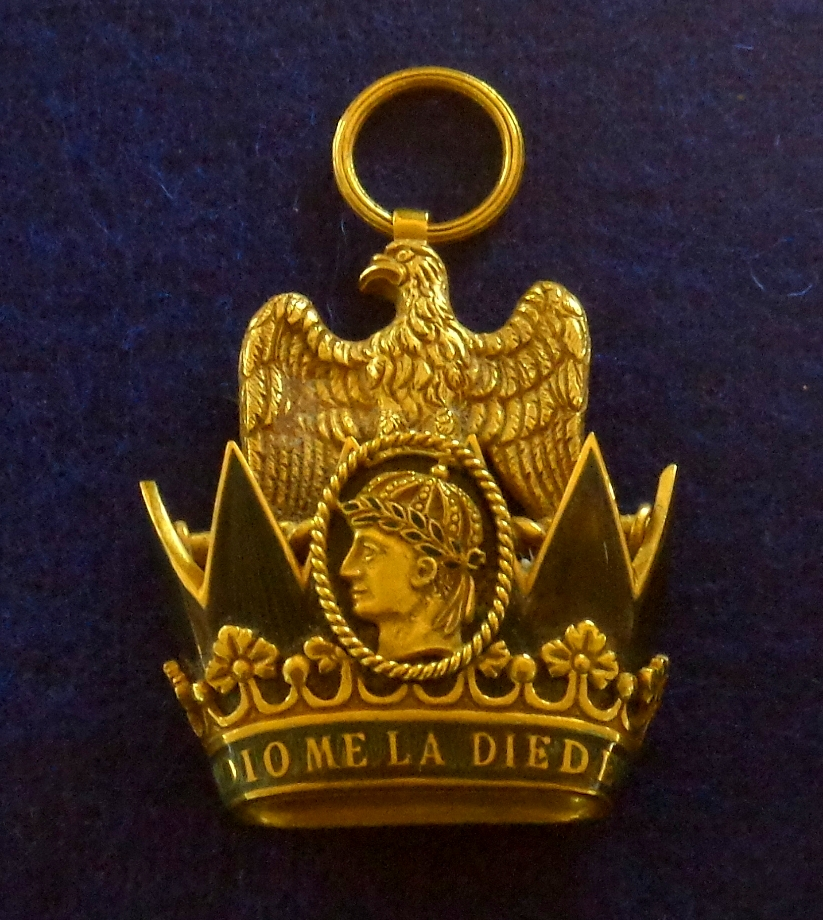
- Badge of the order

Awarded by the King of Italy
- Type: Order of merit
- Established: 5 June 1805
- Country: Kingdom of Italy (France) French Empire
- Status: Extinct

Precedence
- Next (higher): Order of the Reunion
- Ribbon of the order

The Order of the Iron Crown (Italian: Ordine della Corona Ferrea) was an order of merit that was established on 5 June 1805 in the Kingdom of Italy by Napoleon Bonaparte under his title of Napoleone I, King of Italy.

The order took its name from the ancient Iron Crown of Lombardy, a medieval jewel with what was thought to be an iron ring, later shown to be of silver, forged from what was supposed to be a nail from the True Cross as a band on the inside. This crown also gave its name to the Order of the Crown of Italy, which was established in 1868.

After the fall of the Napoleonic Kingdom of Italy in 1814, the order was re-established in 1815 by the Emperor of Austria, Francis I, as the Austrian Imperial Order of the Iron Crown.

== Significance of the Iron Crown ==
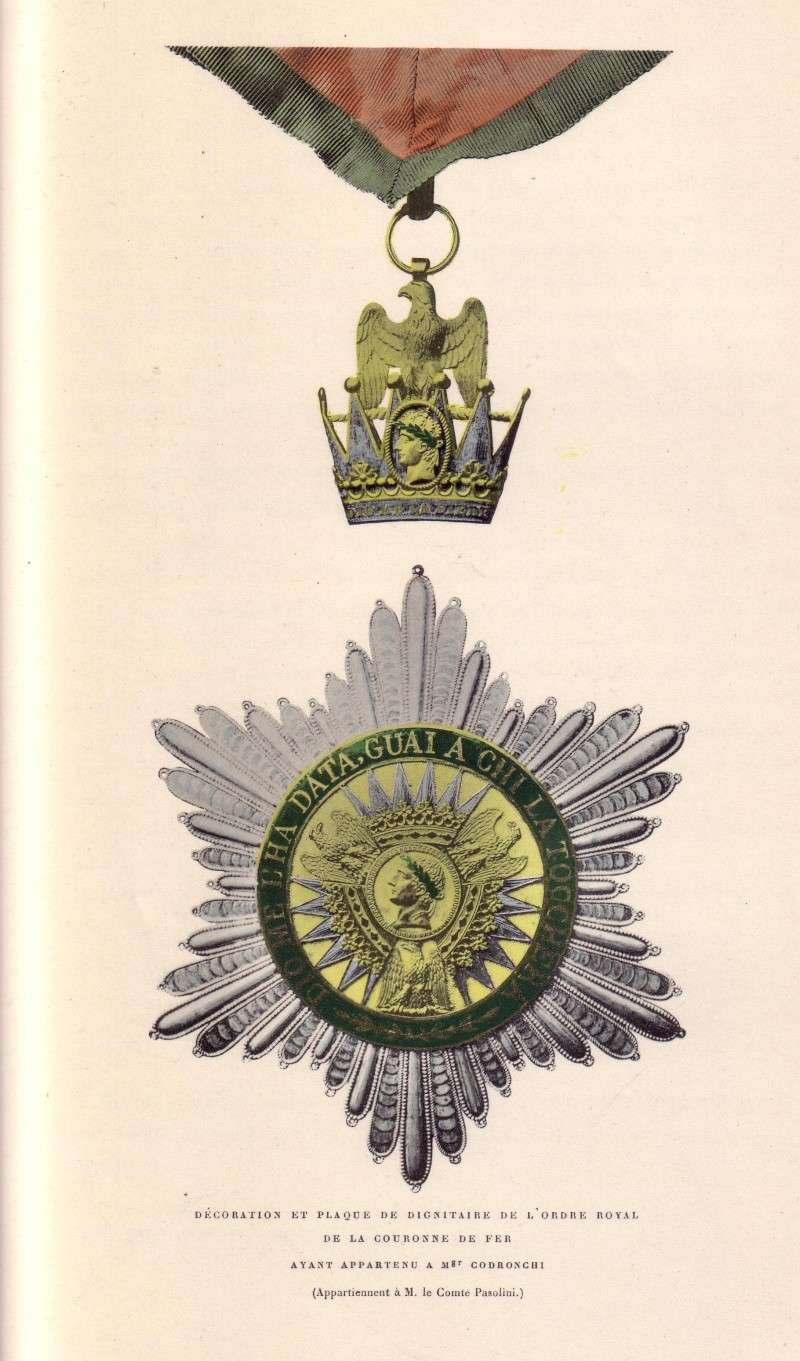
Neck badge and breast star

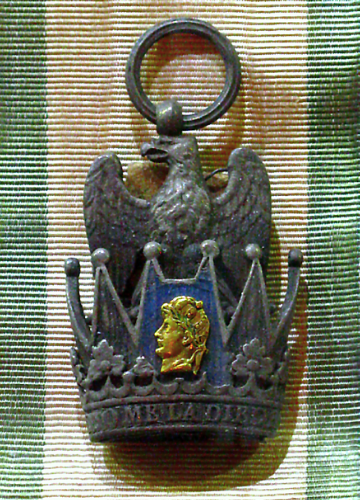
Badge and ribbon of the order

The Iron Crown of Lombardy was allegedly made for Roman emperor Constantine and crafted from the iron of one of the nails in the True Cross used in the Crucifixion of Jesus. Thus came the term of “Iron Crown”. It was allegedly gifted by Pope Gregory I to Theodelinda, Queen of the Lombards, who donated it to the Church upon her death in 628. Afterwards, the crown would have been used for the coronation of the Lombard kings and of Holy Roman Emperor Charlemagne, when he took the throne of Lombardy in 774.

Regardless of origin, the crown is crafted of six hinged plates of gold, set with precious gems, and held together with a circlet structure of white metal underneath. It was most probably a votive crown and the white metal band within has proven to be crafted of silver rather than iron. From the 14th c. onwards, the crown was seen as the most prominent insignia of the Italian kingship. It was therefore used during the coronation of later Holy Roman Emperors as kings of Italy.

It is now kept in the treasury of the Cathedral of Monza.

== Establishment of the order ==
During his continued expansion of power, Napoleon Bonaparte conquered Italy in much the same manner as Charlemagne. As a symbolic gesture, he had himself crowned as King of Italy using the Iron Crown of Lombardy for the coronation, which occurred on 26 May 1805.

Soon after, Napoleon founded the Order of the Iron Crown on 5 June 1805. The order was divided into three classes, with an allowance of up to 20 grand cross knights, 100 commander knights, and 500 ordinary knights.

With the eventual end of the Napoleonic Kingdom of Italy, the original order ceased to exist. However, the Emperor of Austria, Francis I, re-established the order in 1815 as the Austrian Imperial Order of the Iron Crown.

== Insignia ==
The ribbon colors of the order were gold and green, with the badge of the order being an imperial eagle set upon a representation of the Iron Crown of Lombardy.

- Knights wore a traditional military-style medal on the left chest.
- Commanders wore a traditional military-style medal on the left chest, with the addition of a rosette in the center of the ribbon to distinguish them from ordinary knights.
- Holders of the Grand Cross wore a sash over the right shoulder and a neck badge, along with a six-pointed breast star (that featured the Iron Crown at its center) on the left breast.

Ribbon bar
Knight	Commander	Grand Cross

== Master of the order ==
- 1805–1814: Napoleon I, Emperor of the French and King of Italy

== Sources ==
- Blom, Philipp. To Have and to Hold: An Intimate History of Collectors and Collecting. Overlook, 2003. pp. 146–147.
- Gottschalck, Friedrich. Almanach der Ritter-Orden. Leipzig, Kingdom of Saxony: Georg Joachim Goeschen, 1819.
