= Rudolf Szepessy-Sokoll =

Hungarian World War I flying ace

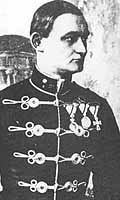
- Rudolf Szepessy-Sokoll in Hussar uniform
- Born: c. 1891; Hungary
- Died: 6 November 1917 (aged 25–26); Vicinity of Latisana, Italy
- Military career
- Allegiance: Austro-Hungarian Empire
- Branch: Hussars; Austro-Hungarian Aviation Troops
- Service years: 1914–1917
- Rank: Oberleutnant
- Units: Fliegerkompanie 17; Fliegerkompanie 10; Fliegerkompanie 27; Fliegerkompanie 3; Fliegerkompanie 41J;
- Awards: Order of Leopold, or Order of the Iron Crown; Military Merit Medal; Medal for Bravery

Oberleutnant Rudolf Szepessy-Sokoll Freiherr von Negyes et Reno (commonly called Rudolf Szepessy-Sokoll) (c. 1891– 6 November 1917) was a Hungarian World War I flying ace credited with five aerial victories. He began his military career as a cavalryman as the war began in 1914. After winning the Silver Medal for Bravery and being promoted into the officers' ranks, he transferred to the Austro-Hungarian Aviation Troops in mid-1915 as an aerial observer. On 14 February 1916, while participating in a historic strategic bombing raid on Milan, he scored his first aerial victory. After shooting down another airplane and an observation balloon, Szepessy-Sokoll was transferred to a fighter unit after pilot training. After shooting down a pair of Macchi L.3s on 5 November 1917, he was killed in action the next day.

He flew a strategic bombing mission directed against Milan, Italy, on 14 February 1916; this is believed to be the first strategic bombing mission in history.

== Early life ==
Rudolf Szepessy-Sokoll (complete name Rudolf Szepessy-Sokoll Freiherr von Negyes et Reno) was born in Hungary in 1891. Both his parents were Hungarian. Rudolf Szepessy-Sokoll grew into a tall slender humorous man.

At the beginning of World War I, he went into combat as a cavalryman on the Russian Front with Austro-Hungarian Hussar Regiment No. 1. In December 1914, he won the Silver Medal for Bravery, First Class. On 1 January 1915, he was promoted into the officers' ranks as a Leutnant. In March 1915, he was awarded the Bronze Military Merit Medal.

== Aerial service ==
=== Reconnaissance duty ===
During the summer of 1915, Szepessy-Sokoll transferred to the Austro-Hungarian Aviation Troops. He trained at Fischamend as an aerial observer and was then assigned to Fliegerkompanie 17 (Flik 17; Flyer Company 17). The general purpose squadron operated a mixture of two-seater reconnaissance aircraft, though a few single-seat fighters were added later.

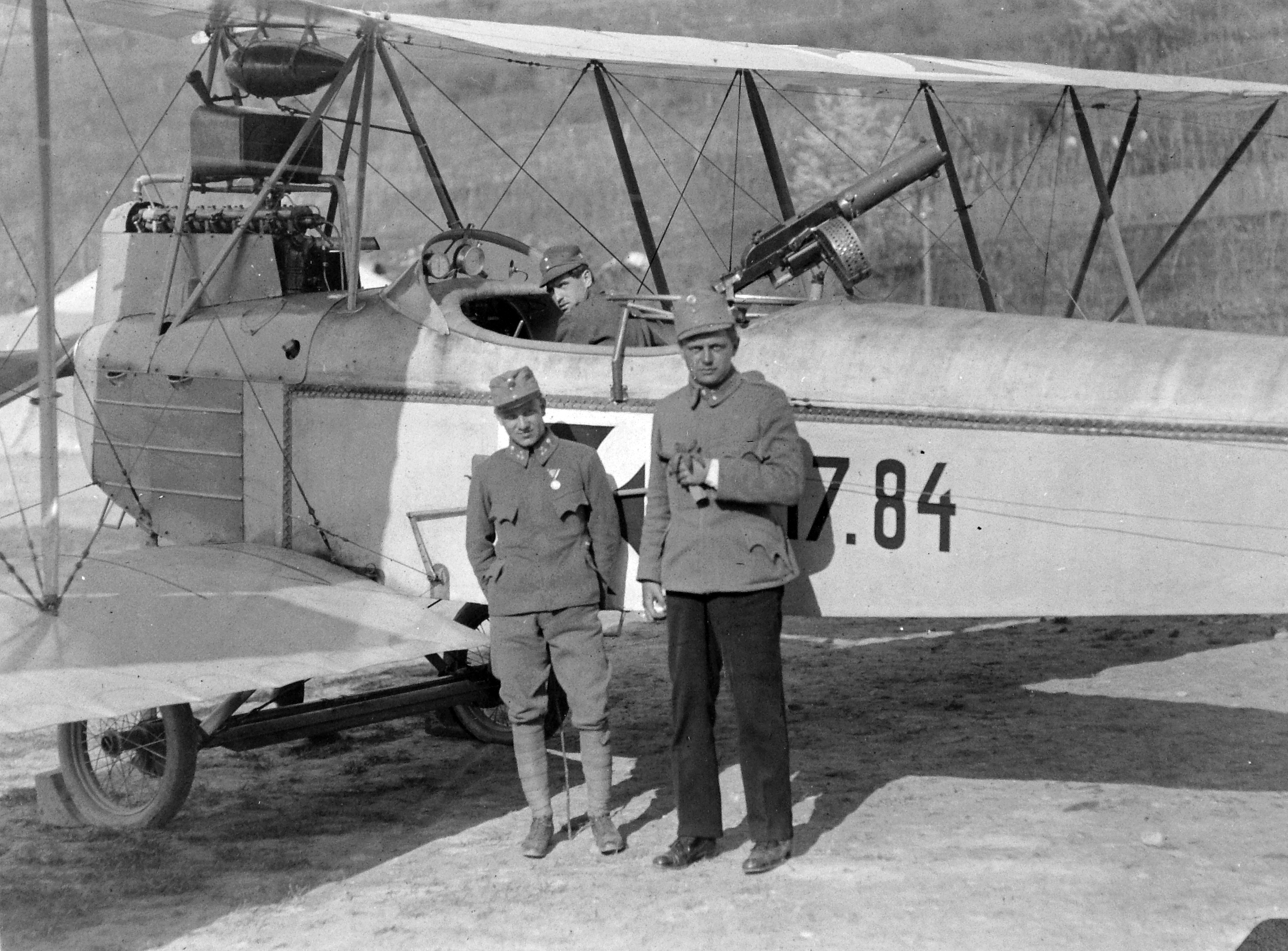
A Lohner B.VII

As dawn broke on 14 February 1916, ten Austro-Hungarian two-seaters mustered from three squadrons took off from Gardolo Airfield fully fueled and loaded with up to 80 kilograms of bombs. Fliegerkompanie 7, Fliegerkompanie 16, and Fliegerkompanie 17 supplied the aircraft; Szepessy-Sokoll flew as observer/gunner on a Lohner B.VII from Flik 17. After about 175 kilometers of flight, the Austro-Hungarians bombed Milan. Italian antiaircraft gunners blazed away with no result. The bombing raid struggled back to base unharmed.

Szepessy-Sokoll, in conjunction with two other pilots, was credited with his first victory by shooting down a defending Italian Caudron two-seater during this strategic bombing mission. Historical records are mixed as to the actual loss, one saying the Italian army reported the death of the aircrew, while another source denied the loss.

Szepessy-Sokoll did well enough flying with Flik 17 that he won the Silver Military Merit Medal in June 1916. He then volunteered for pilot training in September. He finished his pilot training and received his Field Pilot's Badge on 31 March 1917.

His initial pilot's assignment was to a general purpose squadron, Fliegerkompanie 10 (Flik 10), on the Russian Front. In mid-August 1917, he was transferred to Fliegerkompanie 27 (Flik 27) at Dunajow; a month later he was temporarily posted to Fliegerkompanie 3 (Flik 3) to fly an Albatros fighter. On the morning of 20 September 1917, he shot down and burned a Nieuport south of Boratin while flying an Albatros D.II on an escort sortie. At 08:15 hours on 4 October 1917, he accomplished the hazardous feat of balloon busting, using his Albatros D.III to destroy an observation balloon at Iwanczony.

=== Service in a fighter squadron ===
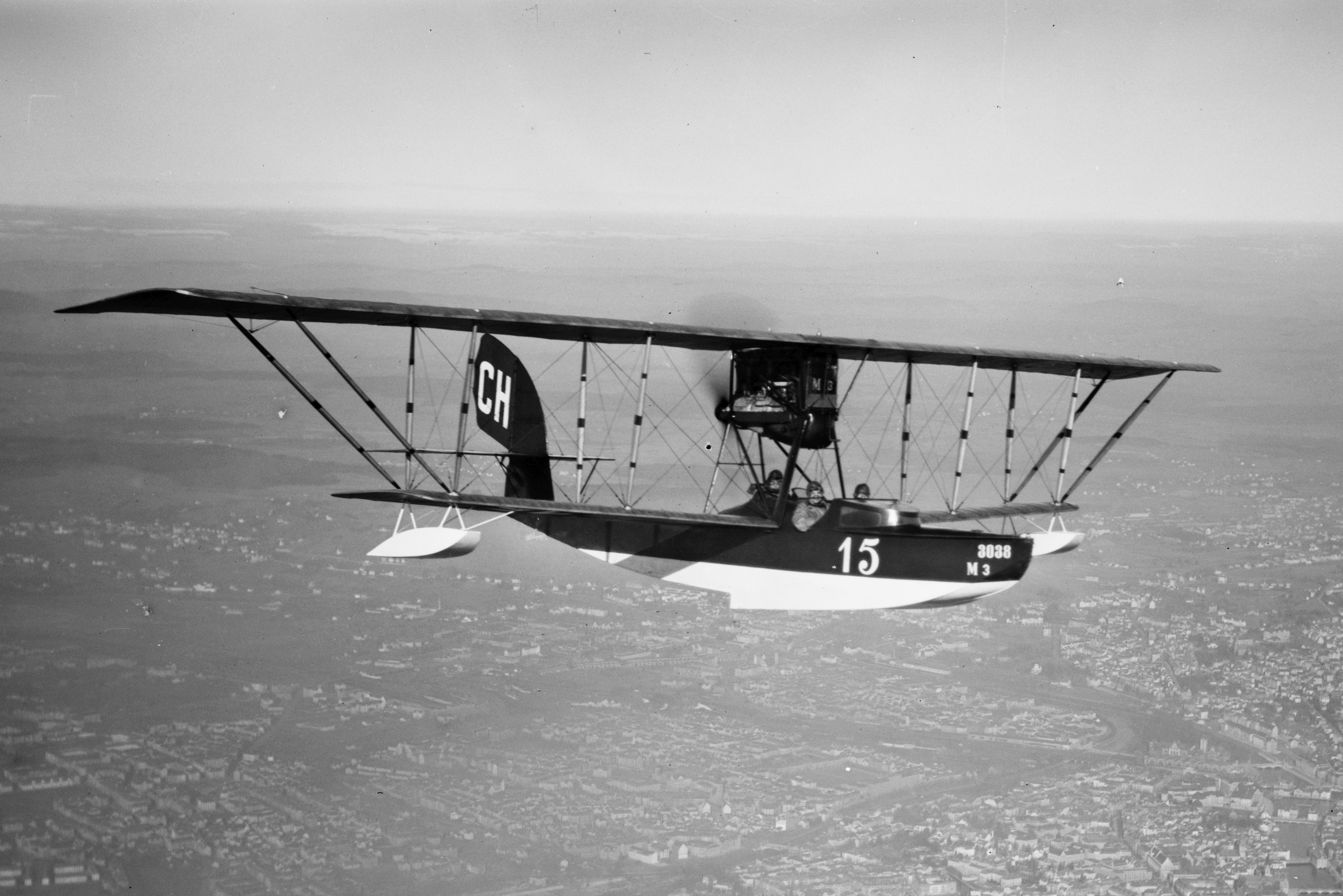
A Macchi M.3 converted for civilian use.

Szepessy-Sokoll was then transferred to a dedicated fighter squadron, Fliegerkompanie 41J (Flik 41J). They were based east of Trieste, under the command of top Austro-Hungarian flying ace Godwin von Brumowski. The commander was not the squadron's only ace; its ranks also included Karl Kaszala, Frank Linke-Crawford, and Kurt Gruber.

On 5 November 1917, Szepessy-Sokoll, Brumowski, and Linke-Crawford disrupted an Italian attack by 15 seaplanes on bridges over the Tagliamento River. The trio shot down a pair of Macchi L.3s, Szepessy-Sokoll thus becoming an ace with victories four and five.

== Death in action ==
The next morning, 6 November 1917, Szepessy-Sokoll and his wingman engaged Italian aces Francesco Baracca and Giorgio Pessi in their SPAD VIIs. Both Austro-Hungarians were defeated, with Szepessy-Sokoll's wingman landing and defecting to the Italians. The abandoned Szepessy-Sokoll spiraled down in an attempted escape from the dogfight, was forced to level off at treetop level, and then was shot in the back by either Pessi or Baracca. The severely wounded Szepessy-Sokoll managed to crash-land his Albatros in Austro-Hungarian territory at 10:30 hours. As his rescuers pulled him from his cockpit, he died. He was buried with honors in the cemetery at Ajello.

Szepessy-Sokoll was posthumously rewarded with his greatest honor, of which there is confusion. He received either the Order of the Iron Crown, Third Class with War Decorations and Swords, or the Knight's Cross of the Order of Leopold with War Decorations and Swords.

== General references ==
- Franks, Norman; Guest, Russell; Alegi, Gregory (1997). Above the War Fronts: The British Two-seater Bomber Pilot and Observer Aces, the British Two-seater Fighter Observer Aces, and the Belgian, Italian, Austro-Hungarian and Russian Fighter Aces, 1914–1918. London: Grub Street. ISBN 1-898697-56-6.
- O'Connor, Martin (1994). Air Aces of the Austro-Hungarian Empire 1914–1918. Flying Machines Press. ISBN 0-9637110-1-6.
- Varriale, Paolo (2012). Austro-Hungarian Albatros Aces of World War I. Osprey Publishing. ISBN 978-1-84908-747-6.
