= Károly Kaszala =

Austro-Hungarian flying ace (1892–1932)

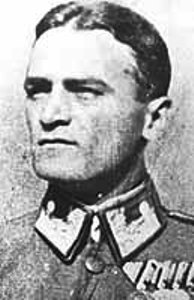
- Kaszala c. 1910-1915
- Born: 20 February 1894; Nyitra, Austria-Hungary
- Died: 4 September 1932 (aged 38); Poroszló, Kingdom of Hungary
- Military career
- Allegiance: Austria-Hungary
- Branch: Austro-Hungarian Aviation Troops
- Rank: Offiziersstellvertreter
- Units: Fliegerkompanie 14; Fliegerkompanie 1; Fliegerkompanie 41J
- Awards: Gold Medal for Bravery; Three awards of the Silver Medal for Bravery, First Class; German Iron Cross Second Class

Károly Kaszala (20 February 1894 – 4 September 1932; Hungarian: Kaszala Károly, German: Karl Kaszala) was an Austro-Hungarian World War I flying ace credited with eight aerial victories, thus winning his nation's highest honor, the Gold Medal for Bravery. Joining the military in 1914, he volunteered for aviation duty after recruit training. After the pilot's training, he was posted to Fliegerkompanie 14, where he refused to fly his assigned aircraft. He was transferred for his insubordination; as he gained experience in his new unit, he and his observers managed to score three aerial victories from his reconnaissance two-seater. He was then upgraded to single-seat fighters, winning four more victories by the end of 1917. He was then posted to test pilot duties until war's end. In addition to the Gold Medal for Bravery, he had won three Silver Medals for Bravery and a German Iron Cross.

Postwar, he would remain active in aviation, working as a flight instructor and barnstormer. He was flying as the latter when he crashed to his death on 4 September 1932.

== In the beginning ==
Károly Kaszala was born in 1892 in Nyitra, the former Austro-Hungarian Empire, present day Slovakia. He joined the Austro-Hungarian Army in 1914. Shortly after recruit training he volunteered for the Austro-Hungarian Aviation Troops and underwent pilot training. It became apparent that Kaszala did not fit easily into military discipline. He wore white trousers with his uniform instead of the regulation dark ones. He also had a phobia about the dark and locked himself in his room to sleep.

== Aerial service ==
=== Reconnaissance missions ===
Two weeks after Kaszala completed flight training, he was promoted to korporal (corporal) on 6 October 1915. His first flying assignment was to Fliegerkompanie 14 (Flyer Company 14, abbreviated to Flik 14) to fly reconnaissance missions on the Russian Front. The squadron was equipped with Aviatik B.IIIs; even though it was his first posting, the rookie pilot refused to fly them because he considered them too hazardous.

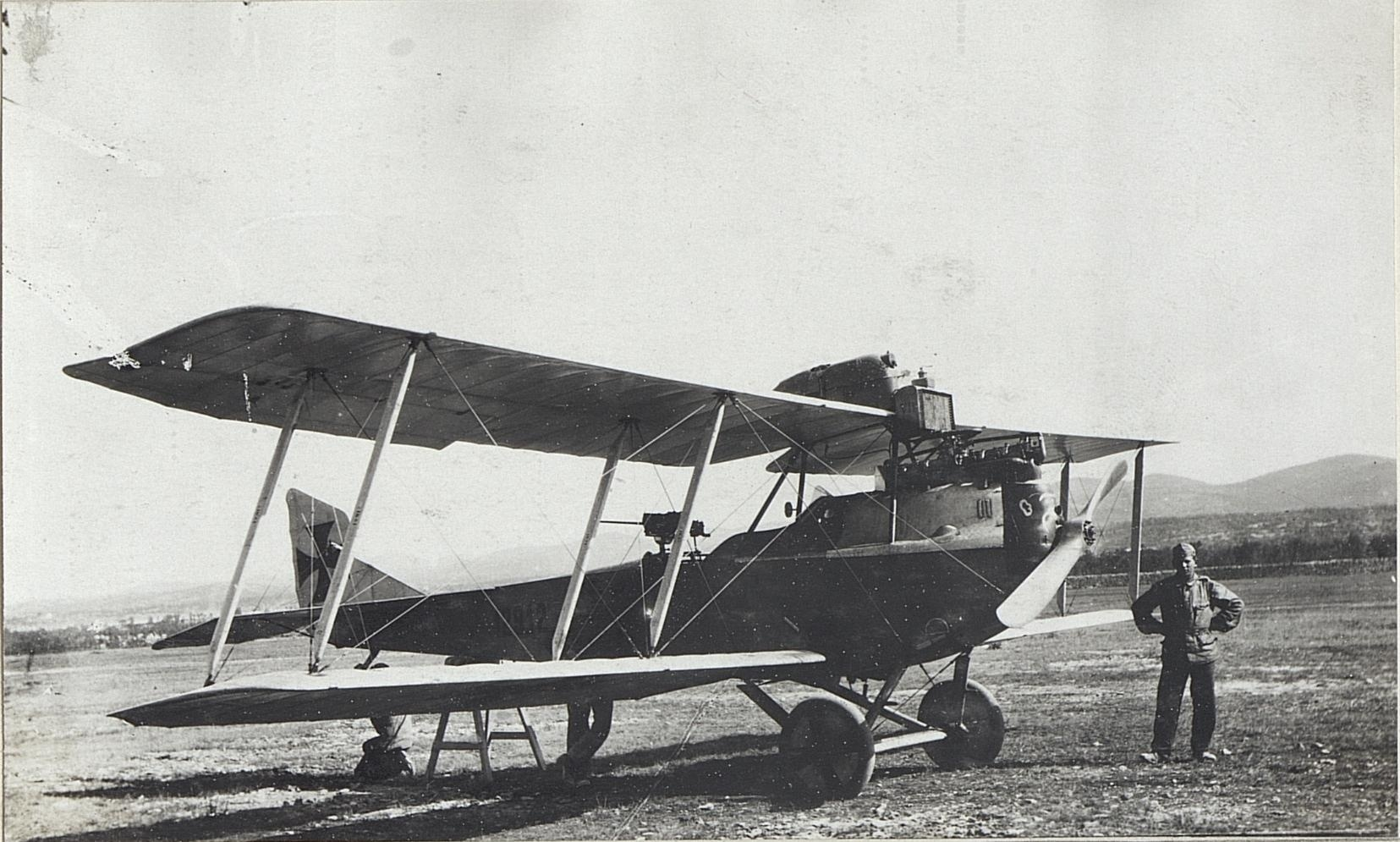
A Hansa-Brandenburg C.I

Somehow dodging blame for insubordination, Kaszala was transferred to another reconnaissance squadron, Fliegerkompanie 1, to fly a Hansa-Brandenburg C.I under Otto Jindra. He gained proficiency as he flew combat sorties on the Romanian Front. Flik 1 was a general purpose unit; it flew bombing and ground attack missions, directed artillery fire, gathered military intelligence, and intercepted intruding enemy airplanes. Kaszala had a variety of aerial observers who flew with him on these sorties and manned the rear gun; one of them was noted ace Godwin von Brumowski. Using his Hansa-Brandenburg C.I, he was credited with defensive victories on 13 December 1916 and 5 and 23 January 1917. The latter came during a squadron bombing raid on the railway station at Bucecea, Romania.

In early 1917, Kaszala was awarded the Silver Medal for Bravery First Class, as well as the German Iron Cross Second Class. The latter was the sole award of an Iron Cross to an Austro-Hungarian enlisted pilot.

=== Fighter service ===
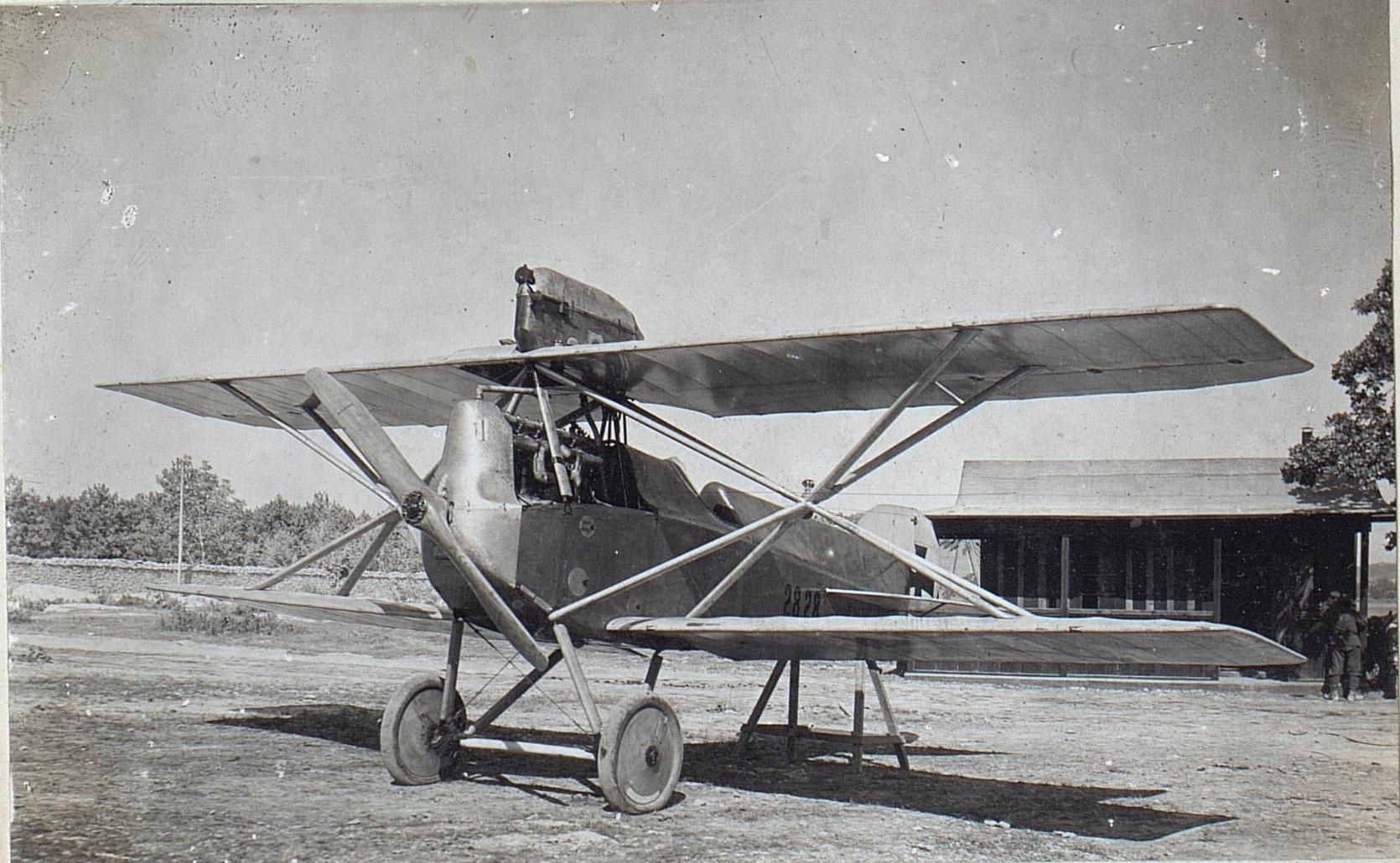
A Hansa-Brandenburg D.I fighter. Note machine gun pod above top wing.

In February 1917, Kaszala was transferred to single-seat fighter duty. There is confusion in the records. One source says he was sent to Fliegerkompanie 21J temporarily. Another says he had a choice in postings. Fliegerkompanie 42J, a squadron largely manned by fellow Hungarians, invited him to join. However, at the same time, Brumowski was appointed to found a new fighter unit, Fliegerkompanie 41J, and offered Kaszala a billet. Kaszala accepted, and moved to the Italian Front to fly a Hansa-Brandenburg D.I single-seat fighter. Flik 41J was first based eight kilometers east of Trieste; after the Battle of Caporetto, they relocated westward to the Piave Front.

Kaszala gained a reputation for bold aggression, as he did not hesitate to attack when badly outnumbered by the enemy. He also became noted as Brumowski's wingman. On 12 May 1917, Kaszala scored a victory over a Farman; eight days later, he became an ace by sharing another victory with Brumowski. Kaszala was awarded a second Silver Medal for Bravery.

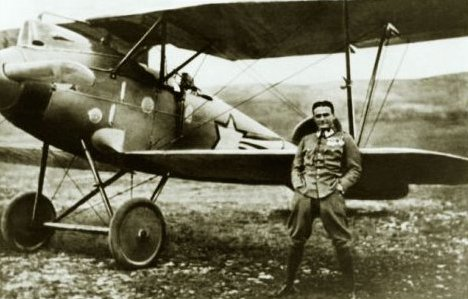
Kaszala posed in front of his Albatros D.III.

In August 1917, Kaszala was promoted to Stabsfeldwebel. In October he was picked as an Offiziersstellvertreter. At about this time, Kaszala upgraded to an Albatros D.III fighter, though one without a synchronized gun. Instead, its machine gun was angled outwards to the left to fire outside the propeller arc. Kaszala had a white six-pointed star as his personal insignia (per photograph).

On 28 November 1917, Kaszala and Brumowski each gained a victory when they jointly shot down a Savoia-Pomilio SP.3 at Casa Serpo. However, even though confirmed by Austro-Hungarian headquarters, this victory may be an overclaim, as Italian records report the date of the battle as the 27th, with no losses.

On 10 December 1917, Kaszala teamed with Frank Linke-Crawford for Kaszala's seventh victory and Linke-Crawford's twelfth. Three days later, Kaszala scored his eighth and last victory in a highly hazardous balloon-buster mission. He teamed with Brumowski and Linke-Crawford as the trio burned an Italian observation balloon at Meolo. Kaszala won his third Silver Medal for Bravery, followed by the premier Gold Medal for Bravery.

In April 1918, he was shifted off combat duty to a more restful posting as a test pilot at an aircraft supply airfield until war's end.

== Postwar activities ==
Kaszala chose to return to an emergent Hungary to continue an aviation career. In 1919, he flew for Hungary's Red Air Corps in operations against the Serbs, Czechs, and Romanians. Afterwards, he continued to be active in aviation. Kaszala found work as a flight instructor.

In 1927, he helped found the Aero Club at Hungary's Technical University. Three years later, the club bequeathed a farewell gift of a Hansa-Brandenburg B.I to Kaszala. He and his wife, who was also a pilot, earned a living as barnstormers as they flew this craft in air shows for the next couple of years. However, on 4 September 1932, Kaszala spun in during a low level pass, dying in the resulting crash. Depending on the source, either his wife or a passenger also died in the accident.
