= Kurt Gruber (aviator) =

Austro-Hungarian flying ace

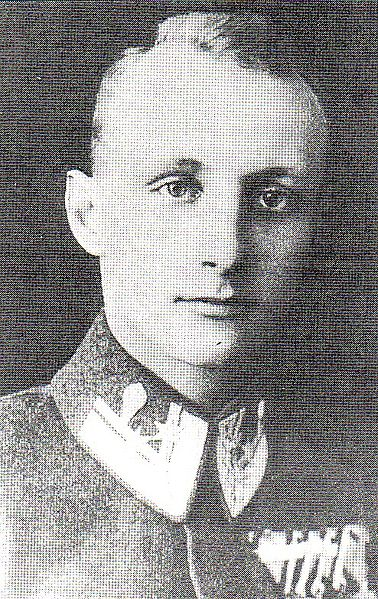
- Born: 1896; Linz, Austria
- Died: 4 April 1918 (aged 21–22)
- Military career
- Allegiance: Austro-Hungarian Empire
- Branch: Aviation
- Rank: Offiziersstellvertreter
- Units: Flik 1, Flik 41J, Flik 60J
- Awards: Two Silver Bravery Awards, four Gold Bravery Medals

Kurt Gruber (1896 – 4 April 1918) was an Austro-Hungarian flying ace during the First World War who held the rank of Offiziersstellvertreter. He was credited with eleven aerial victories, 5 shared with other pilots.

== Early life ==
Kurt Gruber was born in 1896 in Linz, Austria. Gruber was a technical student studying engineering in Saxe-Altenburg, Germany when World War I began.

== Entry into military service ==
He began service in the Austro-Hungarian army at the outbreak of war in 1914. He volunteered to transfer to aviation. He was accepted for pilot's training because of his engineering background. By August 1915 he was assigned to Flik 1 on the Russian Front under Hauptmann Otto Jindra. Gruber became the pilot of choice for the observers of the group. In September he was promoted to Zugsführer (lance sergeant). In January 1916 he received his first Silver Bravery Award.

== Aerial service ==
Gruber scored his first aerial victories on 14 April, 2 May, and 6 June 1916, with Godwin Brumowski manning the observer's guns in the Albatros B.I on the 2nd. The 6 June victory was the first by a lone Austro-Hungarian aviator; flying without a gunner, he used his front machine gun to force a Morane-Saulnier Parasol to land.

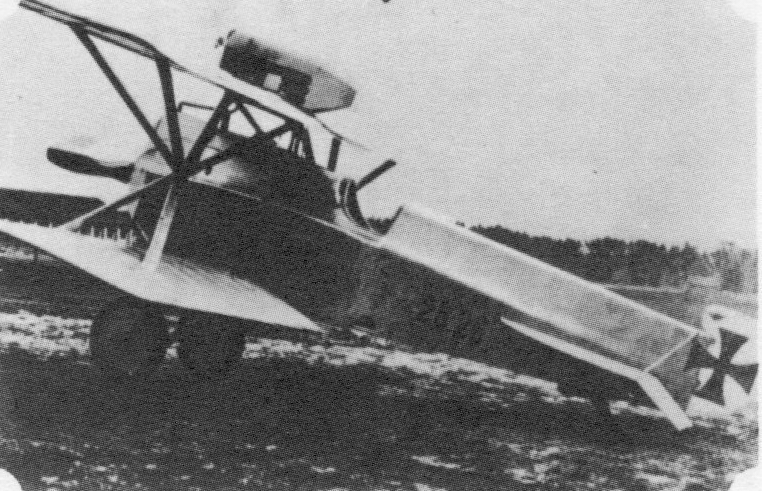
A Hansa Brandenburg D.I. Note the non-synchronized wing-top gun, and the clustered wing struts that impede vision.

On 1 June Gruber was promoted well ahead of cycle to Feldwebel (sergeant). Ten weeks later he was promoted to Stabsfeldwebel (sergeant major). In December 1916 Gruber was assigned a five-month test pilot stint at the Army Air Service Arsenal. In mid-May 1917 he was assigned to Austria-Hungary's first true fighter squadron, Flik 41J. On 21 May 1917 he spun in from low altitude, destroying his Hansa-Brandenburg D.I and suffering injuries that kept him non-operational until September. He scored his fourth victory on 29 September. He became both an ace and a balloon buster on 3 October 1917 when he destroyed an Italian observation balloon. This late in the war, he was still flying an Albatros D.III without interrupter gear; the airplane's machine gun was angled to the left to fire past the end of the propeller arc.

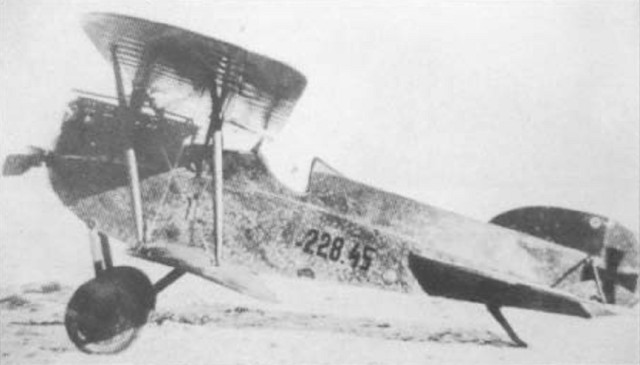
Phönix D.I serial number 228.45. Kurt Gruber's Phönix D.I was s/n 228.24.

Gruber was transferred to Flik 60J on 23 December 1917, under Frank Linke-Crawford. The squadron was equipped, with the Phönix D.I. Between 10 January and 4 April 1918, Gruber scored six more victories. Gruber was shot down and killed on 4 April 1918 in combat with Sopwith Camels of No 66 Squadron, moments after his final claim.

Gruber was recommended by his commanding officers for commissioning as an officer, but the Austro-Hungarian military did not believe in battlefield promotions. Kurt Gruber died as a senior sergeant. He was posthumously awarded the Gold Bravery Medal for the fourth time, becoming one of only two quadruple recipients of the decoration (Julius Arigi). He was buried with honors at Feltre, Italy.
