= Phönix D.I =

Austro-Hungarian fighter plane of WW1

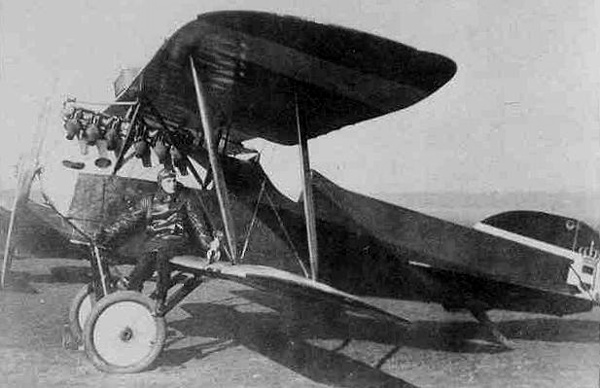
- A typical Phönix D.I

General information
- Type: Biplane fighter
- National origin: Austria-Hungary
- Manufacturer: Phönix Flugzeug-Werke
- Primary user: KuKLFT
- Number built: 158

History
- Introduction date: December 1917
- First flight: 1917

The Phönix D.I, with the D.II and D.III variants, was an Austro-Hungarian First World War biplane fighter built by the Phönix Flugzeug-Werke and based on the Hansa-Brandenburg D.I.

== Development ==
The Phönix D.I was the second design developed by the Phönix Flugzeug-Werke based on Hansa-Brandenburg D.I design which it has produced under licence. The D.I was a single-seat biplane fighter with improvements over the original Hansa-Brandenburg design which included more efficient wings, a more powerful engine and structural improvements. A prototype was first flown in 1917 and proved to be fast but difficult to handle but because of the urgent need for fighters the D.I entered production. To improve the problems a modified variant, the D.II was introduced with balanced elevators and balanced ailerons on the upper wings. A further development was the D.III which had balanced ailerons on both wings and a more powerful 230 hp (170 kW) Hiero 6 in-line engine. The last of 158 aircraft of all three types was delivered on 4 November 1918.

== Operational service ==
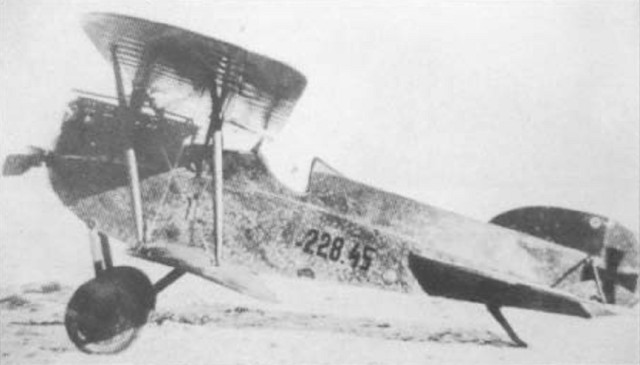
Phönix D.I in Austro-Hungarian service

Army D.Is entered service in December 1917. It was used as an escort fighter by Fliks 4/D, 15/D, 17/D, 48/D, 54/D and 66/D. (D-Fliks were small general-purpose units, capable of short-range reconnaissance, bombing, defense and artillery-spotting duties, consisting of 4−5 aircraft, both single-seat fighters and twin-seat observation/light bomber types.) It was used as a fighter in Fliks 14/J, 30/J, 60/J, 61/J and 63/J. (J-Fliks - J for "Jagd", i.e. Hunting - were fighter units, having an official complement of 18 aircraft, something that very few had in practice.)

It was favorably received by pilots, not least by those that were used to flying twin-seaters who found it stable, robust and easy to fly. One complaint was that the D.I was "almost too stable for quick combat maneuvers". Some were equipped with cameras and thus converted to dedicated reconnaissance machines. Several Austro-Hungarian aces used this aircraft, among them Kurt Gruber, Roman Schmidt, Karl Teichmann, Godwin Brumowski, Benno Fiala Ritter von Fernbrugg, Franz Gräser, Karl Nikitsch, Frank Linke-Crawford and József Kiss - who was killed while flying a D.II on May 24, 1918.

== Variants ==
Data from Austro-Hungarian Army Aircraft of World War One

20.15
prototype for D.I
20.16
prototype for D.I
20.18
prototype for D.II
D.I
(series 128, 228, 328) Initial production variant with a 200hp (149kW) Hiero inline engine.
D.II
(series 122, 222, 322) Improved variant with balanced elevators and balanced ailerons on the upper wings.
D.IIa
(series 422) Powered by a 230 hp (170 kW) Hiero 6
D.III
(series 222.100) Improved variant with balanced ailerons on both wings and powered by a 230 hp (170 kW) Hiero 6 in-line engine.
J.1
Swedish Air Force designation for the D.III fighters purchased in 1920.

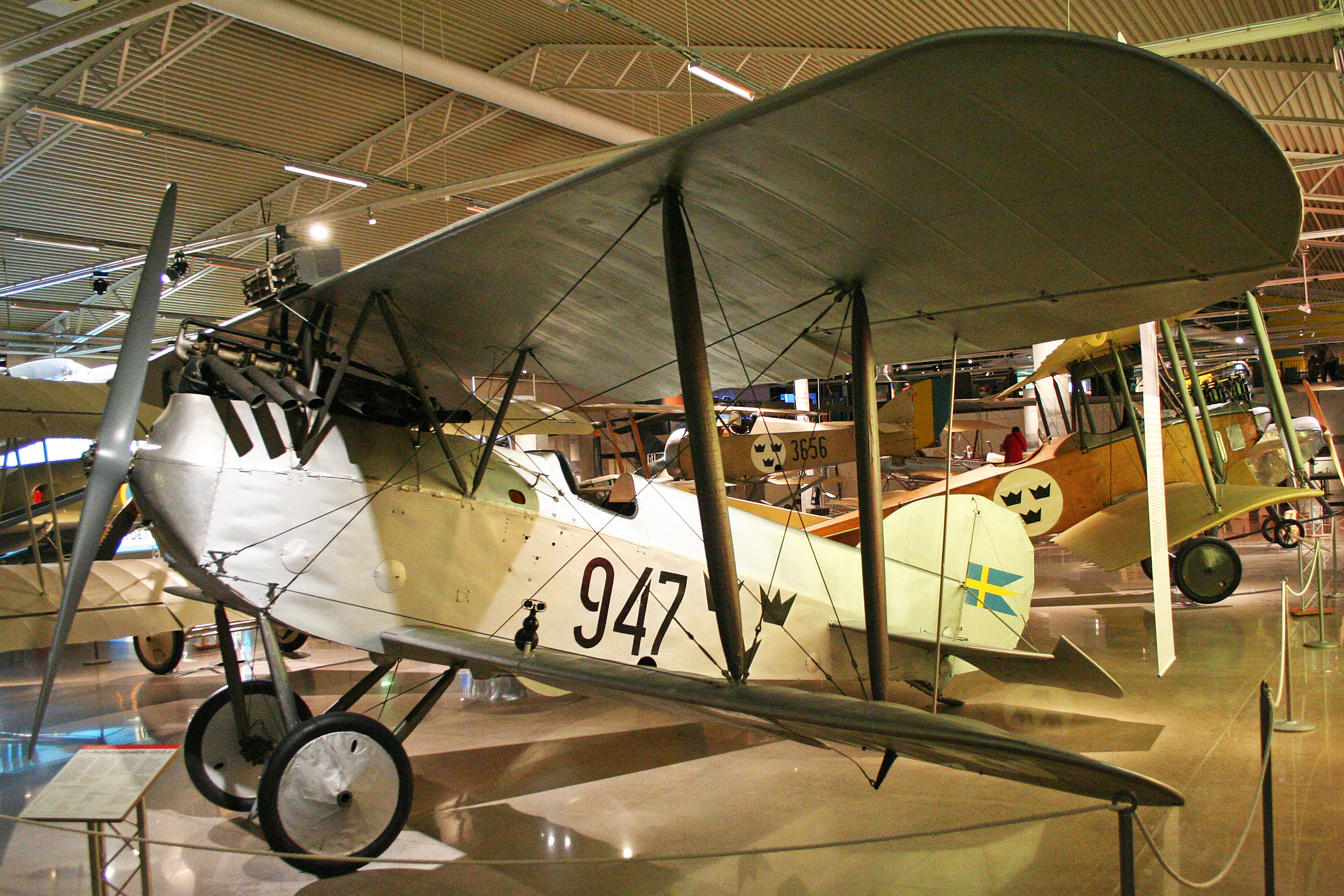
A Swedish Air Force J.1 (D.III) on display at the Swedish Air Force Museum

== Operators ==
Austria-Hungary

- KuKLFT
- Austro-Hungarian Navy

Sweden

- Swedish Air Force - Postwar

Kingdom of Yugoslavia

- Royal Yugoslav Air Force - Postwar.

== Specifications (D.1) ==
Data from

General characteristics

- Crew: 1
- Length: 6.65 m (21 ft 10 in)
- Wingspan: 9.75 m (32 ft 0 in)
- Height: 2.8 m (9 ft 2 in)
- Gross weight: 805 kg (1,775 lb)
- Powerplant: 1 × Hiero 6 six-cylinder water-cooled in-line piston engine, 150 kW (200 hp)
- Propellers: 2-bladed wooden fixed-pitch propeller

Performance

- Maximum speed: 180 km/h (110 mph, 97 kn)
- Service ceiling: 6,000 m (20,000 ft)

Armament

- Guns: 2 × Synchronised fixed forward-firing 8 mm (0.315 in) Schwarzlose machine guns
