= Karl Nikitsch =

Military officer and flying ace from the Austro-Hungarian Empire

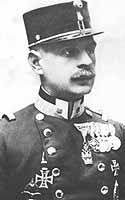
- Born: January 17, 1885; Gross-Czakowitz, Austro-Hungarian Empire
- Died: September 7, 1927 (aged 42)
- Military career
- Allegiance: Austro-Hungarian Empire; First Austrian Republic
- Branch: Kaiserliche und Königliche Luftfahrtruppen (Imperial and Royal Aviation Troops)
- Rank: Hauptmann
- Units: Fliegerkompanie 14; Fliegerkompanie 16
- Commands: Fliegerkompanie 39; Fliegerkompanie 63J
- Awards: Order of the Iron Crown 3rd Class with War Decoration and Swords, German Iron Cross 1st and 2nd Class, Military Merit Medal in Bronze with Swords
- Other work: Commanded Austrian Flugpolizei

Hauptmann Karl Nikitsch (17 January 1885—7 September 1927) was a professional soldier who served, in succession, the Austro-Hungarian Empire and the First Austrian Republic. His First World War service in the Austro-Hungarian Imperial and Royal Aviation Troops was marked by his abilities in organizing, staffing, and commanding flying squadrons. He also became a flying ace credited with six aerial victories Postwar, he commanded the Austrian Flugpolizei.

== Early life ==
On 17 January 1885, Nikitsch entered the world at Gross-Czakowitz, Austro-Hungarian Empire, in present-day Czechoslovakia. After primary schooling, he attended a Technical High School for four terms, then Cadet School for a further four terms.

== Military career ==
=== Infantry service ===
Upon graduation from Cadet School, he became an officer in the Austro-Hungarian 35th Infantry Regiment. His athletic prowess led to his assignment to teaching some 700 fencing and gymnastics instructors to coach their sport. He also earned himself many gold medals in fencing, culminating in his becoming a Junior World Master in 1910.

=== Aerial service ===
In the early days of the First World War, Nikitsch was recruited for pilot training. By May 1915, he was capable of flying as Deputy Commander of Fliegerkompanie 16 (Flik 16) out of Villach on the Italian Front, though primarily on test flights.

Transferred to Fliegerkompanie 14 (Flik 14) on the Russian Front in late July 1915, Nikitsch learned to excel in artillery direction missions supporting the Austro-Hungarian 2nd Army. He was awarded the Bronze Military Merit Medal with Swords.

In November 1915, he was posted to Strasshof (near Vienna) as commander; there he would assemble, outfit, and train entire squadrons headed to battle. These units included Fliks 24 through 38. However, on 3 July 1916, Nikitsch crashed while on a test flight, leading to a short spell in hospital.

In January 1917, Nikitsch was finally granted his request for a combat assignment. He was told to form Flik 39 at Strasshof as his own unit. He had his novices trained, supplied, and organized by March. They were posted to Csíkszereda on the Romanian Front. It was a small sloping airstrip with a hazardous drop-off at one end.

It soon became apparent that the French and Russian opposition had to be prevented from attacking Flik 39's reconnaissance machines. Nikitsch modified one of his unit's two-seaters into a single-seater escort fighter. In July, fighter craft and pilots from Fliks 29, 31, 33, and 39 were massed to protect the area's recon machines, Nikitsch among them. On 19 July, Nikitsch scored his first aerial victory flying an Albatros D.III; his second came four days later. With his favorite mount being a Hansa-Brandenburg D.I, he shot down two Nieuports and a Farman during August 1917. On 27 November 1917, he scored one final victory, again using an Albatros.

As the Battle of Caporetto raged, Flik 39 was detailed in support of the Austro-Hungarian 1st Corps. Additionally, on 16 October 1917, Nikitsch was tasked with managing several Austro-Hungarian and German squadrons during the battle. As the Austro-Hungarians advanced some 100 kilometers and communications began to break down, Nikitsch knit the air effort together with repeated recon and courier flights. His success in this earned him both classes of the Iron Cross and the Order of the Iron Crown with War Decorations and Swords.

Nikitsch was named to command Fliegerkompanie 63J in January 1918. A serious crash intervened, sending him to hospital. After a long convalesensce, he would be sent to command an Aviation Training Battalion in Wiener Neustadt until war's end.

== Postwar ==
Nikitsch studied law at the University of Graz, earning his Doctor of Law degree. He also commanded Austria's covert Flugpolizei, which had been founded using aircraft left over from the war.

On 7 September 1927, Nikitsch was test flying a French fighter when it suffered engine failure. He died in the crash.

== Bibliography ==
- Franks, Norman; Guest, Russell; Alegi, Gregory (1997). Above the War Fronts: The British Two-seater Bomber Pilot and Observer Aces, the British Two-seater Fighter Observer Aces, and the Belgian, Italian, Austro-Hungarian and Russian Fighter Aces, 1914–1918. Grub Street. ISBN 978-1898697565.
- O'Connor, Martin (1994). Air Aces of the Austro-Hungarian Empire 1914 - 1918. Flying Machines Press. ISBN 978-0-9637110-1-4.
