= Godwin von Brumowski =

Austro-Hungarian Air Force fighter ace

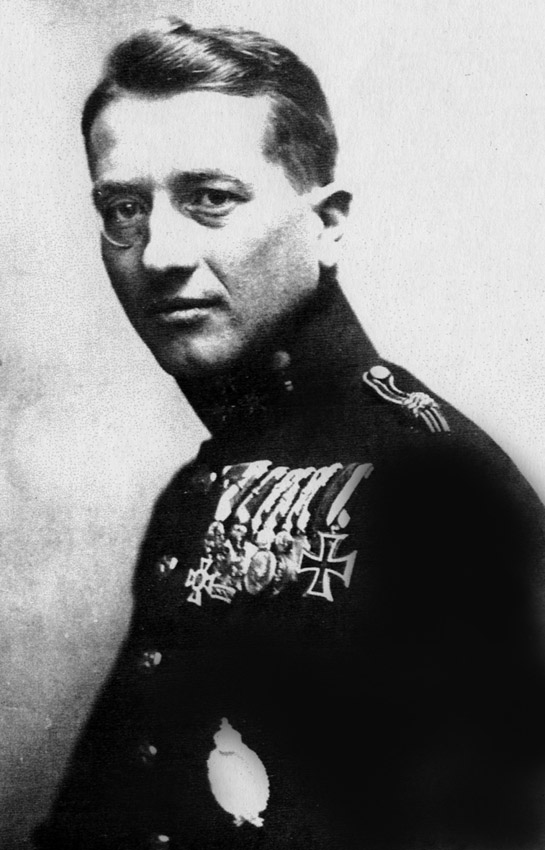
- Godwin Brumowski in the 1930s.
- Born: 26 July 1889; Wadowice, Galicia; Austria-Hungary
- Died: 3 June 1936 (aged 46); Schiphol, Netherlands
- Military career
- Allegiance: Austria-Hungary
- Service years: 1910 - 1918
- Rank: Hauptmann
- Units: Fliegerkompanie 1, Fliegerkompanie 12 of the Luftfahrtruppen; Jasta 24 of the Luftstreitkräfte
- Commands: Fliegerkompanie 41J of the Luftfahrtruppen
- Awards: Order of the Iron Crown (Austria), Order of Leopold, Medal for Bravery (Austria-Hungary), Military Merit Medal, Iron Cross

Godwin Karol Marian von Brumowski (26 July 1889 – 3 June 1936) was the most successful fighter ace of the Austro-Hungarian Air Force during World War I. He was officially credited with 35 air victories (including 12 shared with other pilots), with 8 others unconfirmed because they fell behind Allied lines. Just before the war ended, Brumowski rose to command of all his country's fighter aviation fighting Italy on the Isonzo front.

== Life before entry into air service ==
Godwin von Brumowski was born into a military family in Wadowice, Galicia (in present-day Poland). He attended the Imperial and Royal Technical Military Academy in Mödling near Vienna and graduated as a lieutenant commissioned into the 29th Field Artillery Regiment on 18 August 1910.

He was serving in the 6th Artillery Division as regimental adjutant and had just turned 25 years of age when war was declared against Serbia on 28 July 1914. He served on the Eastern Front against Russia, winning both a Bronze and Silver Medal for Bravery before transferring to air service in the Imperial and Royal Aviation Troops (k.u.k. Luftfahrtruppen).

== Aerial service ==
He was posted to Fliegerkompagnie 1 (Flik 1) at Czernowitz, commanded by Hauptmann Otto Jindra, in July 1915; Brumowski was thus initially assigned as an aerial observer on the Russian Front. His flight log describes him as 1.77 meters (5 feet 10 inches) tall, with blue eyes and light blond hair.

On 12 April 1916, Jindra and Brumowski crewed one of the seven Austro-Hungarian planes that participated in bombing a military review attended by Czar Nicholas II. In the process, they shot down two of the seven Russian Morane-Saulnier Parasol two-seaters that attempted to drive them off.

On 3 July 1916 Brumowski became a pilot with Flik 1, despite the defective vision in his right eye that he corrected with a monocle. In November, he transferred to Flik 12 on the Italian Front. He helped down an Italian Caproni bomber on 3 December. On 2 January he became an ace when he was victorious over an Italian Farman two-seater while piloting a Hansa-Brandenburg C.I. It is notable that Brumowski became an ace while still flying two-seater craft basically unsuited for air-to-air combat.

The next month, when Flik 41J was established on the Italian Front as Austro-Hungary's first dedicated fighter squadron, Brumowski was chosen to command it. He spent nine days in March flying four sorties with the Germans of Jagdstaffel 24 to learn German fighter tactics, before assuming his command. While here he met the Red Baron, Manfred von Richthofen; Brumowski would later copy the baron's aircraft paint scheme for his own plane.

Brumowski continued amassing victories through May, ending the month with a total of eight. By now, he was flying a single-seat fighter, the Hansa-Brandenburg D.I. Although better suited for air-to-air combat than the C.1, it still suffered three major disadvantages: the pilot's vision was partially obstructed; the single machine gun was not synchronized to fire through the propeller arc, and it was a difficult craft to fly because it was easy to spin at any altitude. Aiming and firing a gun mounted above and ahead of the pilot was more difficult than simply aiming the airplane at the enemy and firing a synchronized gun.

As was customary with Austro-Hungarian units, Flik 41j had an assortment of aircraft types available. In June 1917 Brumowski flew an Aviatik D.I with no combat success. The Austro-Hungarian Fliks were also hampered by a doctrine that tied them to escort of reconnaissance aircraft instead of freeing them to rove and hunt in the German fashion.

In July 1917 Flik 41J lost eleven of the D.I fighters in accidents; the Hansa-Brandenburg's nickname became "the flying coffin".

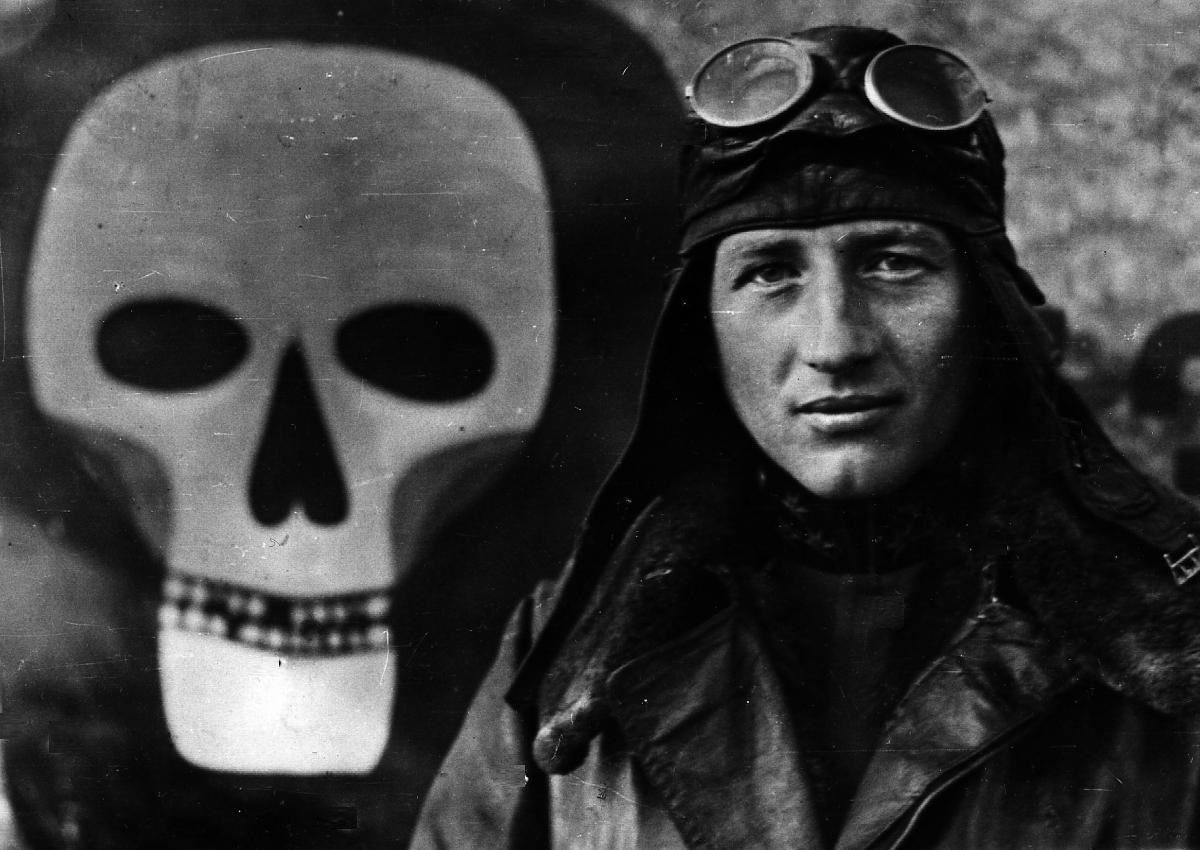
Godwin Brumowski and his aircraft insignia.

In August 1917 Brumowski scored a remarkable streak of victories, being credited with 12 confirmed and 6 unconfirmed kills between 10 and 28 August. Two of these victories, on the 19th and 20th, were the result of a partial transition to a newer fighter plane, a German Albatros D.III with twin synchronized guns. On the 20th he scored once with the Albatros and twice with the Hansa-Brandenburg D.I. By the end of August the transition was complete; he would use the Albatros to score the rest of his victories.

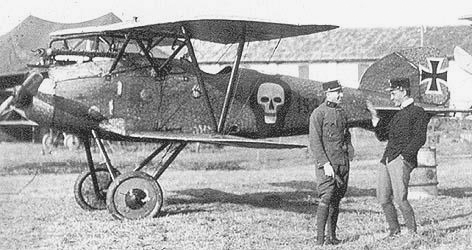
Godwin von Brumowski (left) and Frank Linke-Crawford in front of Brumowski's Albatros D.III, December 1917

On 9 October 1917, he shot down and burned an observation balloon for his 22nd victory; it was the first of five balloons he would down. His Albatros that day was painted all red, in emulation of Richthofen, with the addition of mustard-colored skulls on either side of the fuselage. This paint scheme would become characteristic of his aircraft until war's end.

On 1 February 1918, Brumowski became involved in a fight with eight enemy fighters. Some of the 26 bullets striking his Albatros ignited the fuel tank built into the upper wing. He managed to land at his home field without serious injury, becoming a rare survivor of an in-craft fire. The fire ate the fabric off the upper wing and the inboard portions of the lower one, leaving only the scorched bare spars and struts of the wing roots.

Three days later, while flying another Albatros he fought eight British fighters and took multiple machine gun hits. With his wings breaking up he still managed to land, though the Albatros flipped over and was totally destroyed.

Brumowski fought on until 23 June 1918, when he was ordered on extended leave. His last successful fight was on 19 June; he scored his 35th victory and suffered 37 hits in his plane. He had flown 439 combat sorties, but his combat career was ended.

Also on 23 June he was invited by Generaloberst (Colonel-General) Ferdinand to make the customary mandatory application for Austria-Hungary's highest decoration, the Knight's Cross of the Military Order of Maria Theresa. Brumowski's reply:

"If I have earned this award through my service, then it should be cause enough for the Commander in Chief to present it to me. It is not my duty to ask or demand it."

Austria-Hungary's leading fighter ace never received his nation's highest award.

On 11 October even though he was still only a Hauptmann (Captain), he was named to command all Austro-Hungarian fighter squadrons on the Isonzo Front. World War I ended a month later.

== Postwar career ==
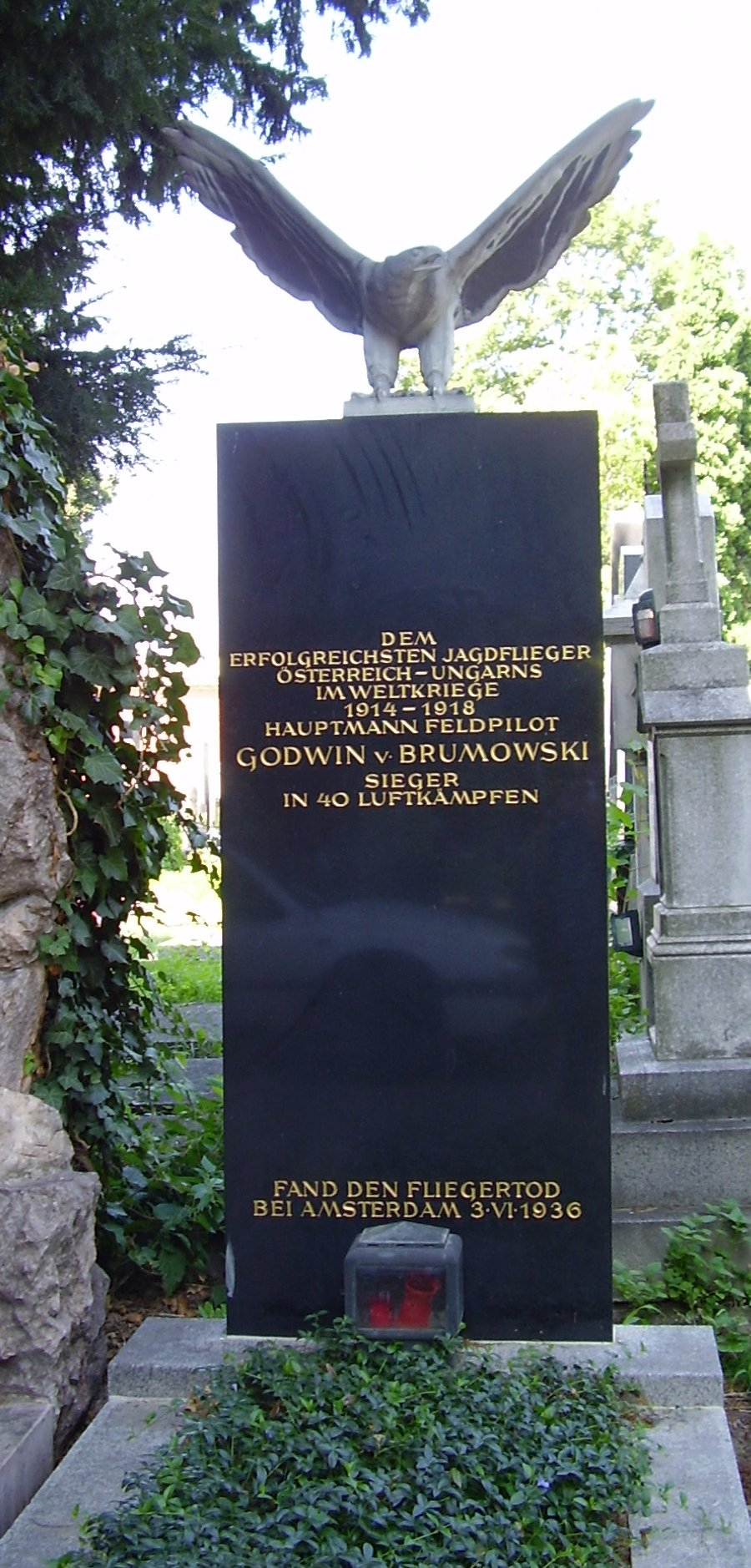
The grave of Godwin von Brumowski at Zentralfriedhof in Vienna, Austria.

The end of the war left Brumowski at loose ends. After a spell in Vienna, he farmed his widowed mother-in-law's land in Transylvania for ten years. As a city dweller lacking the Hungarian language skills to communicate with his farm workers, he bore serious handicaps. He had little success.

Brumowski took the dissolution of the Austro-Hungarian Empire very hard. He indulged in hazardous pursuits, seeking the thrill of danger by racing automobiles about on the poor local roads, riding horses into exhaustion, and hunting in the mountains. He threw parties, danced, swam, and ice skated to distract himself. He then left his wife and daughter behind to start a flying school in Vienna in 1930, and later remarried.

During the early 1930s, Brumowski piloted aircraft on behalf of the conservative Heimwehr militia. During the brief Austrian Civil War in 1934 he flew several reconnaissance missions as well as a single combat sortie.

On 3 June 1936, he died in a plane crash while instructing a Dutch student at Schiphol Airfield, in the Netherlands. His life was summarized thus by his daughter: "He was a very unique and interesting person either very much loved, or hated, and even considered crazy by many."

== Awards and decorations ==
- Order of the Iron Crown (Austria), 3rd class, with War Decoration
- Knight's Cross of the Order of Leopold with War Decorations and Swords
- Gold and Silver Bravery Medal for Officers
- Silver Military Merit Medal
- Bronze Military Merit Medal
- Iron Cross of 1914, 2nd class

== List of aerial victories ==
See also Aerial victory standards of World War I

Confirmed victories are numbered. Victories marked "u/c" were unconfirmed.

No.	Date/time	Aircraft	Foe	Result	Location	Notes
1	12 April 1916	Albatros B.I serial number 22.23	Morane-Saulnier Parasol of the Imperial Russian Air Service	Destroyed in crash; pilot seriously wounded	Iszkowcy, north of Chotin	Brumowski's pilot: Otto Jindra
2	12 April 1916	Albatros B.I s/n 22.23	Morane-Saulnier Parasol of the Imperial Russian Air Service	Destroyed in crash; pilot injured	West of Chotin	Brumowski's pilot: Otto Jindra
3	2 May 1916 at 0945 hours	Albatros B.I s/n 22.30	Morane-Saulnier Parasol of the IRAS	Crew seriously injured in crash landing	Lysskowcy	Victory shared with Kurt Gruber
4	3 December 1916 in the afternoon	Hansa-Brandenburg Star-Strutter s/n 65.53	Italian Caproni Ca.1 s/n 1233	Driven down behind Austro-Hungarian lines; 4 aircrew captured	East of Mavhinje	Victory shared with Gottfried Freiherr von Banfield and another pilot
5	2 January 1917 in the afternoon	Hansa-Brandenburg C.I s/n 68.24	Italian Farman	Forced to land	Vicinity of Lago di Doberdò	Brumowski's observer: J. G. Telekes
6	10 May 1917	Hansa-Brandenburg Star-Strutter s/n 28.10	Voisin	Forced to land in enemy territory	Monfalcone	
u/c	12 May 1917	Hansa-Brandenburg Star-Strutter s/n 28.10	Italian Farman	Forced down in enemy territory		
7	12 May 1917	Hansa-Brandenburg Star-Strutter s/n 28.10	Italian Nieuport scout	Crashed	"Enemy territory"	
u/c	13 May 1917	Hansa-Brandenburg Star-Strutter s/n 28.11	Twin engine Voisin two-seater			
8	20 May 1917 @ 1030 hours	Hansa-Brandenburg Star-Strutter s/n 28.10	SAML S.1 two-seater	Forced to land; pilot wounded in action (Tenente Rino Corso Fougier and Tenente Ubaldo Chiara)	Sveta Gora	Victory shared with Karl Kaszala
9	17 July 1917	Hansa-Brandenburg Star-Strutter s/n 28.57	Twin-engine Voisin	Crashed into the river in flames; observer WIA	Isonzo River	Victory shared with two other pilots
10	10 August 1917	Hansa-Brandenburg Star-Strutter s/n 28.69	Italian Nieuport scout	Landed with stopped engine	Čepovan	
11	11 August 1917	Hansa-Brandenburg Star-Strutter s/n 28.57	Italian Caudron two-seater	Set afire	Plave	Victory shared with another pilot
12	11 August 1917 @ 2000 hours	Hansa-Brandenburg Star-Strutter s/n 28.69	Caudron two-seater	Set afire	West of Plave	
13	14 August 1917	Hansa-Brandenburg Star-Strutter s/n 28.69	Italian single-seater sea plane	Set afire	Vicinity of Grado	
u/c	14 August 1917	Hansa-Brandenburg Star-Strutter s/n 28.69	Italian single-seater seaplane	Forced to land	Vicinity of Grado	
u/c	18 August 1917	Hansa-Brandenburg Star-Strutter s/n 28.69	Italian two-seater Savoia-Pomilio SP.3	Forced to land	Sveta Gora	
14	18 August 1917	Hansa-Brandenburg Star-Strutter s/n 28.69	Caudron	Forced to land	Sveta Gora	
u/c	19 August 1917	Hansa-Brandenburg Star-Strutter s/n 28.69	Italian single-seater seaplane	Forced to land		
u/c	19 August 1917	Hansa-Brandenburg Star-Strutter s/n 28.69	Italian single-seater seaplane	Forced to land		
15	19 August 1917	Albatros D.III s/n 153.06	Two-seater Caudron	Crashed in flames	Between Karbinje and Ivangrad	
16	20 August 1917	Albatros D.III s/n 153.06	Italian two-seater Savoia Pomilio (Sergente Emilio Lubiani and Tenente Gallina)		San Giovanni-Monfalcone	Victory shared with two other pilots (Hermann Richter)
17	20 August 1917	Hansa-Brandenburg Star-Strutter s/n 28.69	Two-seater Caudron		Vicinity of Vrtojba	
18	21 August 1917	Hansa-Brandenburg Star-Strutter s/n 28.69	Enemy airplane		Sveta Gora	Victory shared with Frank Linke-Crawford
19	22 August 1917	Hansa-Brandenburg Star-Strutter s/n 28.69	Savoia-Pomilio	Forced to land	Gorizia	Victory shared with Frank Linke-Crawford
20	23 August 1917 @ 1040 hours	Hansa-Brandenburg Star-Strutter s/n 28.69	Italian Savoia-Pomilio SP.3 two-seater	Forced to land; captured	Bate	Victory shared with Frank Linke-Crawford and another pilot. Italian pilot and observer captured
u/c	25 August 1917	Hansa-Brandenburg Star-Strutter s/n 28.69	Sopwith two-seater	Enemy observer wounded or dead	Enemy territory	Also claimed by Frank Linke-Crawford
21	26 August 1917	Hansa-Brandenburg Star-Strutter s/n 28.69	Italian Spad single-seater		Škabrijel	Victory shared with Frank Linke-Crawford
u/c	28 August 1917	Hansa-Brandenburg Star-Strutter s/n 28.69	Savoia-Pomilio two-seater	Forced to land	Enemy territory	
22	9 October 1917 @ 1700 hours	Albatros D.III s/n 153.45	Italian Observation balloon	Set afire; observer parachuted	Isola Morosini, near Sdobba Estuary	Victory shared with Frank Linke-Crawford, Kurt Gruber
23	5 November 1917	Albatros D.III s/n 153.45	Macchi L.3 two-seater flying boat	Forced down and destroyed; crew KIA	West of Latisana	Victory shared with Frank Linke-Crawford, Rudolf Szepessy-Sokoll
24	5 November 1917	Albatros D.III s/n 153.45	Macchi L3 two-seater flying boat	Crashed into a canal	Baseleghe, west of Latisana	Victory shared with Frank Linke-Crawford, Rudolf Szepessy-Sokoll
25	17 November 1917	Albatros D.III s/n 153.45	Observation balloon		Piave River Estuary	
26	23 November 1917	Albatros D.III s/n 153.45	Nieuport scout	Forced to land	Mouth of the Piave River, near Cortelazzo	Victory shared with Frank Linke-Crawford
27	23 November 1917	Albatros D.III s/n 153.45	Nieuport scout	Forced to land	Mouth of the Piave River, near Cortelazzo	Victory shared with Frank Linke-Crawford
28	28 November 1917	Albatros D.III s/n 153.52	Savoia-Pomilio two-seater		Casa Serpo	Victory shared with Karl Kaszala
29	13 December 1917	Albatros D.III s/n 153.52	Observation balloon	Set afire	In the vicinity of Meolo	Victory shared with Karl Kaszala, Frank Linke-Crawford
30	25 March 1918	Albatros D.III s/n 153.45	Pomilio PE two-seater	Set afire; Pilot Sergente Renzo Baudino and observer Tenente Orazio Brizio Soletti KIA;	South of Oderzo	
31	17 April 1918	Albatros D.III s/n 153.45	Sopwith Camel		Arcade, Italy	Victory shared with Miroslav Navratil
32	16 June 1918	Albatros D.III s/n 153.209	Observation balloon	Set afire	Spresiano	
33	19 June 1918 @ 1545 hours	Albatros D.III s/n 153.209	Observation balloon	Set afire	In the vicinity of Passarella	
34	19 June 1918	Albatros D.III s/n 153.209	Italian two-seater SAML	Set afire; Pilot Tenente Carlo Scavini and observer Tenente Mario Beltramolli KIA;	Comtee, south of Candelu	Victory shared with another pilot
35	19 June 1918	Albatros D.III s/n 153.209	Ansaldo SVA.5		Montello	
