= Emil Uzelac =

Austro-Hungarian military commander

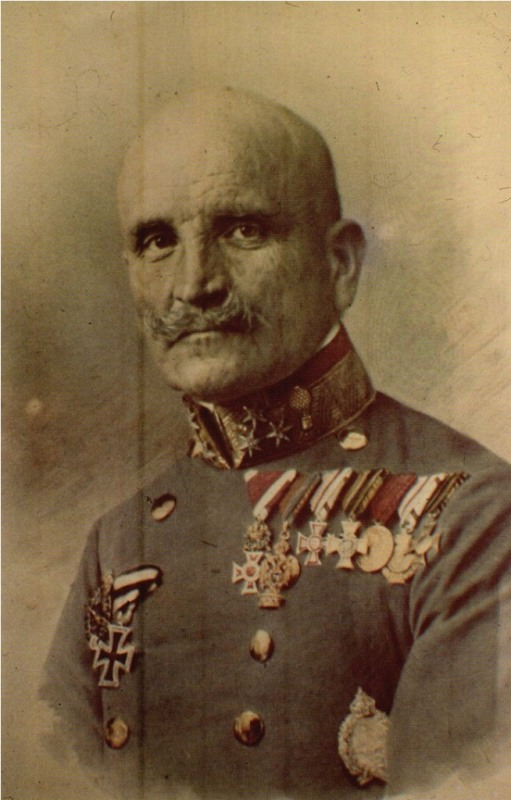
- Born: Milan Uzelac; 26 August 1867; Komárom, Hungary, Austria-Hungary
- Died: 7 January 1953 (aged 85); Zagreb, PR Croatia, FPR Yugoslavia
- Burial place: Mirogoj, Zagreb, Croatia
- Military career
- Allegiance: Austria-Hungary (1912–18) Kingdom of Yugoslavia (1920–23) Independent State of Croatia (1941)
- Service years: 1912–18; 1920–23; 1941
- Rank: General
- Commands: Department of Aircraft Ships (1912–18) Department of the Air Force (1920–23) Air Force of the Independent State of Croatia (1941)
- Conflicts: World War I World War II

Milan Emil Uzelac (26 August 1867 – 7 January 1954) was a leading figure in the air forces of the Austro-Hungarian Empire, Kingdom of Yugoslavia and the Independent State of Croatia.

== Early life and education ==
Emil Uzelac was born in Komárom, at the time in Austria-Hungary, on 26 August 1867, to a Serbian Orthodox family from Lika. He grew up in the vicinity of Karlovac where he finished gymnasium after which he enrolled at the Technical Military Academy of Civil Engineering and Crafts in Vienna from which he graduated on 18 August 1888.

== Career ==
After graduation, Uzelac entered the 2nd Engineer Regiment as a Lieutenant and served in Pula and Trieste. He also worked in Zadar as an engineering technical expert. After graduating in electrical engineering, he enrolled at the Naval Academy in Trieste and was promoted to the rank of the Lieutenant of the Merchant Navy. As an officer on the merchant ship, he sailed to New York City.

=== Service in Austria-Hungary ===
After two years, Uzelac entered the Engineer's Command and served in Klagenfurt. He was promoted to the rank of Major on 1 May 1908. At the proposal of General Alexander von Krobatin, Uzelac was appointed Commander of the Imperial and Royal Aviation Troops. Since his appointment on 24 April 1912 until the dissolution of the Austro-Hungarian Empire in 1918, Uzelac was the only true commander of the whole Austro-Hungarian Air Force. After four weeks, Uzelac passed a pilot test and immediately continued training for the combat pilot which he finished in August of the same year.

His task was very difficult because he had to found aviation in a country of limited industrial capacity and lack of raw materials, in the conditions of poor understanding among military authorities and highly bureaucratized military and overall state system. In 1912, Emperor Franz Joseph I awarded him Military Merit Cross for his achievements. Uzelac was awarded numerous domestic and foreign awards for his role in the modernization of the Austro-Hungarian aviation.

In addition to flying in a plane, he also flew in an air balloon and was on 15 May 1914 awarded the diploma of the leader of free balloons by the Austrian aeroclub. On 7 November 1912, while performing his first looping, he had an accident and ended up in the hospital from which he came out as soon as he regained consciousness.

He commanded the air force until the end of the First World War. On 1 May 1918, he was promoted to the rank of Major General. When the command was reorganized on 1 October 1918, he was formally degraded because his position as Air Force Commander was renamed as Deputy Air Force Commander.

=== Service in the Kingdom of Yugoslavia ===
Following the end of the First World War, Uzelac lived for some time in Petrinja and was drafted into the Royal Yugoslav Army on 28 November 1919, along with two other Austro-Hungarian generals, Rudolf Maister and Ante Plivelić. He was appointed Chief of the newly created Department of Aviation in the Ministry of the Army and Navy, which was, in reality, the position of the Air Force's Commander-in-Chief. He was in charge of the reorganization and modernization of Yugoslav aviation. Although Uzelac laid the foundations for a modern aviation by building it with the experience gained in Austro-Hungarian air force, he was forcibly retired on 19 August 1923 as "unneeded".

=== Service in the Independent State of Croatia ===
In 1941, Uzelac joined the Air Force of the Independent State of Croatia as an Honorary General. He worked on the construction of NDH's air force. On 25 November 1941, at the age of 74, he retired. On 21 and 22 August 1942, on the occasion of his 75th birthday and the 30th anniversary of service, a ceremony attended by numerous German, Hungarian and Croatian pilots from World War I, was held in Zagreb.

Uzelac was imprisoned following the end of World War II.

He died in Petrinja on 7 January 1954 and was buried at the Mirogoj cemetery.

== Awards ==
- Military Merit Cross
- Saxe-Ernestine House Order
- House Order of Hohenzollern
- Order of the Iron Crown II class with war decoration
- Order of the Iron Crown III class
- Order of Leopold
- Order of the Medjidie II class
- Iron Cross I class
- Iron Cross II class
- Military Merit Medal(Austria-Hungary)
- Military Merit Cross with war decoration and swords
