= Frank Linke-Crawford =

Austro-Hungarian flying ace (1893–1918)

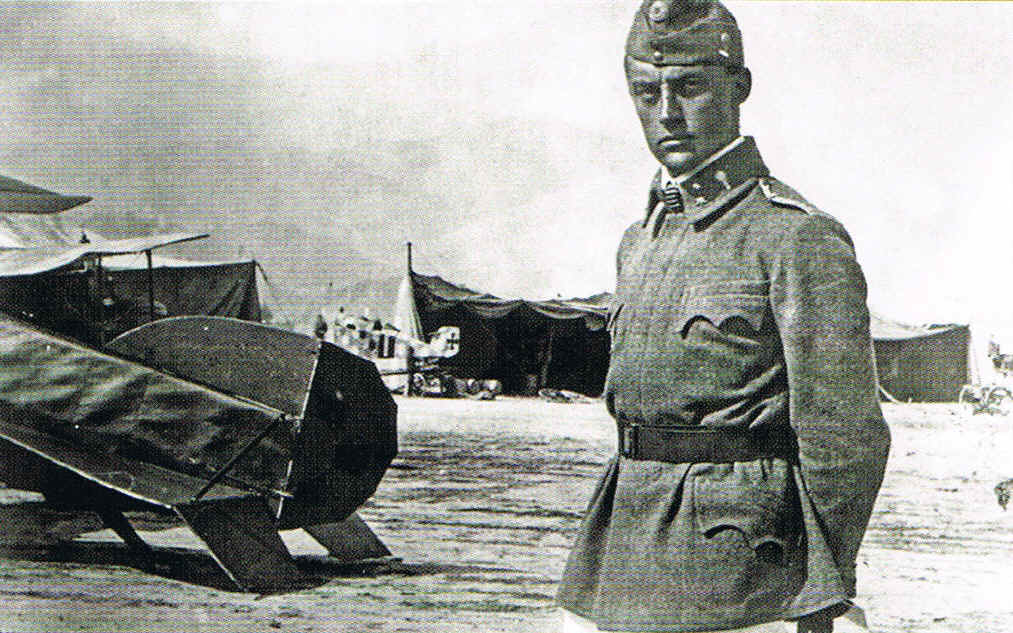
- Frank Linke-Crawford in 1917
- Born: 18 August 1893; Cracow, Galicia; Austria-Hungary
- Died: 30 July 1918 (aged 24); Guia near Valdobbiadene; Kingdom of Italy
- Burial place: Pobrežje Cemetery, Maribor; reinterred in Salzburg Kommunalfriedhof
- Military career
- Allegiance: Austro-Hungarian Empire
- Branch: Infantry, Air Service
- Service years: 1910–1918
- Rank: Oberleutnant
- Nickname: Redhead
- Units: 6th Dragoons, Flik 22, Flik 12, Flik 41
- Commands: Flik 60
- Awards: Order of the Iron Crown

Oberleutnant Frank Linke-Crawford (18 August 1893 – 30 July 1918), was the fourth-ranking ace of the Austro-Hungarian Air Force during World War I, with 27 victories.

== Early life ==
He was born in Cracow, in what is presently Poland but then a provincial city of the Austro-Hungarian Empire. His father, Major Adalbert Linke, was a Galician soldier; his mother, Lucy Crawford, was British. Despite this mixed background, he was an Austrian citizen.

Linke-Crawford attended school in Meran, Tyrol and Hranice (Weißkirchen), Moravia before in 1910 he entered the Theresian Military Academy in Wiener Neustadt. Upon graduation, he was commissioned Lieutenant and assigned to the 6th Dragoon Regiment. On 28 July, a month after the assassination of Archduke Franz Ferdinand, Austria-Hungary declared war on Serbia. This was the initial declaration of war that snowballed into World War I.

Linke-Crawford first saw battle on the Russian Front. In November 1914 he was appointed commander of the infantry troop of the Sixth Dragoons. Between October 1914 and October 1915, he received several decorations; he also was hospitalized several times with malaria and dysentery.

In 1915, Linke-Crawford's fascination with the Luftfahrtruppen (Austro-Hungarian air service) led him to request a transfer for pilot training. His poor health is also mentioned as a reason for his transfer.

== Aerial service ==
Upon his completion of observer training at Wiener-Neustadt in March 1916, Linke-Crawford was posted to Fliegerkompanie 22 to fly reconnaissance and bombing missions in two seater airplanes.

In September 1916, after six active months flying as an observer, he retrained as a pilot.

In January 1917 he was transferred to Fliegerkompanie 12 as chief pilot, which made him second in command of the unit. His new posting was still to a unit serving on the Isonzo Front in northern Italy. While his duties remained recon and bombing, he was now operating over mountainous terrain. He also flew some attack sorties in single seat fighters. On one of these missions, on 13 April, he shot down a Nieuport that cartwheeled into a crash far behind the Italian lines. He did not bother to attempt to claim this victory, though he mentioned it in a letter home to his sister. On 25 May, his aircraft was badly shot up, taking 14 hits from a couple of SPAD fighters. He then had another unconfirmed triumph on 25 June.

He gained a reputation for courage. On one of his long-range reconnaissance missions, he was attacked by an Italian SPAD, which riddled his Hansa-Brandenburg C.I with 68 bullet holes over a half-hour period. Nevertheless, he completed his mission.

On 2 August 1917, while flying his Aviatik C.I with no rear gunner aboard to man the craft's single machine gun, he was shot down as Pier Piccio's eighth victim, but was uninjured.

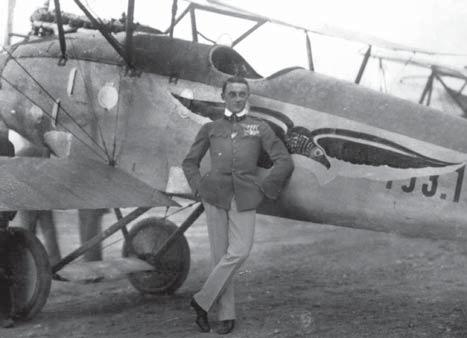
Frank Linke-Crawford in front of his Albatros with falcon insigna, October 1917

On 4 August 1917, he was transferred to Fliegerkompanie 41, situated near Trieste. Flik 41 was Austro-Hungary's most renowned air unit; it was commanded by the empire's top ace, Godwin von Brumowski. Linke-Crawford damaged his airplane upon landing at his new base, Sesana Airfield.

He began wearing a scarlet flying helmet and white trousers when he flew, leading to the nickname of "Redhead". He marked his plane with falcons painted on either side.

He scored his first confirmed aerial victory on 21 August 1917, using a Hansa-Brandenburg D.I to down a Nieuport. In the next five days, he scored three more confirmed wins using this plane, with one claim going unconfirmed.

The Hansa-Brandenburg D.I had serious liabilities as a fighter plane; it spun easily, had poor forward visibility, and its machine gun was mounted well above the pilot's head on the top wing to fire above the propeller arc. It was nicknamed "the flying coffin" and killed more pilots in flying accidents than died in combat.

Linke-Crawford's switch to flying an Albatros D.III mounted him in a fighter that not only offered him better field of vision, especially downward, but also armed him with twin Spandau machine guns in front of him that were synchronized to fire through his propeller.

Flying the Albatros D.III, he shot down a seaplane on 23 September 1917 to become an ace. Continuing to use the Albatros, he ran up a score of 13 by 13 December.

In late December 1917 Linke-Crawford was appointed commander of Fliegerkompanie 60. This unit was stationed at Grigno in northern Italy until March 1918. This airfield was located in a swampy mountainous basin and was prone to flooding. Flik 60j's seven pilots flew against an opposition of British, Italian, and French pilots.

Linke-Crawford's plane in Flik 60j was a Phonix D.I. He used this slow but sturdy twin-gunned fighter to run up seven triumphs in the first three months of 1918. Flik 60 transferred to Feltre, also in northern Italy. This was a better airfield than Grigno.

Linke-Crawford scored his last victory in a Phonix on 11 March. Aeroplanes of this nature were still in their early phases of development, and in mid-March, he is said to have grounded all the Phonix's in his unit because of their increasing unreliability.

Beginning on 10 May, Linke-Crawford switched to an Aviatik (Berg) D.I (115.32) At least five of his seven victories in this machine were over superior aircraft, such as the Sopwith Camel and Bristol F.2 Fighters.

== Death and legacy ==
On 30 July 1918, the day after his final victory, Linke-Crawford was flying an early model Aviatik (Berg) D.I in a formation of four. He separated from his wingmen as they engaged a group of Italian Hanriot HD.1 fighters. His plane reportedly spun out of control before the engagement; as he recovered from the spin Linke-Crawford was fired upon by two of the Italians.

Linke-Crawford's plane caught fire and as it fell out of the sky the vehicle disintegrated, before impacting the ground.

The airial victory was accredited to Italian corporal Aldo Astolfi, which was his sole victory as a fighter pilot.

Given that the Aviatik was the first fighter manufactured entirely in Austria, and that it initially had a reputation for wing failures during violent aerial maneuvers, there was suspicion that Linke-Crawford had fallen afoul of a faulty airplane rather than an Italian pilot.

While the original Aviatik D-I design by Julius von Berg was sound, the Series 115 aircraft licensed and produced by the Lohner firm at Wien-Floridsdorf were notorious for failures along the trailing edges of the wings during high speed maneuvers, as Lohner had deviated from Aviatik specifications by employing thinner, lighter wing ribs. At the time of his death, Linke-Crawford was flying one of these sub-standard machines, build number 115.32.

His legacy was best described by one of his peers, Julius Arigi, who was the second ranked Austro-Hungarian ace:

"Linke was both a fine flier and a fine man. He gave his men full support and generally ignored the rules about officers and non-officers having little to do with each other. He often gave away victories to other, less experienced pilots. As you can imagine, the feelings of his men for him were quite strong."

Although Frank Linke-Crawford was originally buried at Pobrežje Cemetery in Maribor (now Slovenia) after the war, in 1919, he was reinterred in Salzburg.
