= Otto Jindra =

Czech flying ace

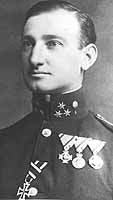
- Born: 18 March 1886; Chlum u Třeboně, Bohemia, Austria-Hungary
- Died: 2 May 1932 (aged 46); Czechoslovakia
- Military career
- Allegiance: Austro-Hungary; Czechoslovakia
- Branch: Aviation
- Rank: Hauptmann
- Commands: Flik 1, Flek 11, Fliegergruppe G
- Awards: Order of the Iron Crown; Military Merit Cross (2); Silver awards of Military Merit Medal (2); Bronze award of the Military Merit Medal; Iron Cross (Second Class)

Hauptmann Otto Jindra (18 March 1886 – 2 May 1932) was a Czech military pilot. He was a flying ace of the Austro-Hungarian Army during World War I, credited with nine aerial victories while flying as an aerial observer. His abilities as both leader and administrator led to his accelerated promotion and appointments to command of aviation units despite his lack of pilot's credentials. After World War I and Austria-Hungary both ended, Jindra became a major mover in founding a Czechoslovak air arm, which he eventually rose to command.

== Early life ==
Otto Jindra was born on 18 March 1886 in Chlum u Třeboně, Bohemia, Austria-Hungary. He grew to be an athletic young man; he was an equestrian, a swimmer, and a skier. He was an enthusiastic cyclist, and learned to drive both automobiles and locomotives.

== Pre-aviation service ==
Jindra graduated from the Artillery Academy in Vienna in 1905, and went into the 14th Mountain Artillery Regiment. He was promoted to Oberleutnant in December 1912. With the outbreak of war, Jindra served as battery commander and regimental adjutant as his regiment swung into combat at the Battle of Lemberg on the Eastern Front. He won the Bronze Military Merit Medal in this action.

== Aviation service ==
Jindra applied for a transfer to aviation. When it came through, he was directly assigned to Flik 1 as an observer on 10 September 1914. Jindra began using a radio transmitter installed by Benno Fiala von Fernbrugg for overhead direction of artillery fire. Given his long prior training as an artillery officer, he was deadly effective. However, on 14 November 1914, Jindra and his pilot were brought down by the riddling fire of a Russian cavalry unit. They counted 180 bullet holes in their crashlanded plane, pulled their personal gear from the wreckage, and headed home, leaving a torched wreck behind them.

In late January 1915, Flik 1's commanding officer was taken prisoner. Despite being a non-pilot, Jindra was selected to replace him. Although Flik 1 was primarily a reconnaissance unit operating a wide range of two-seater aircraft, it still nurtured several flying aces; Godwin von Brumowski, Benno Fiala von Fernbrugg, Kurt Gruber, and Karl Kaszala all began their careers as aces under Jindra's command.

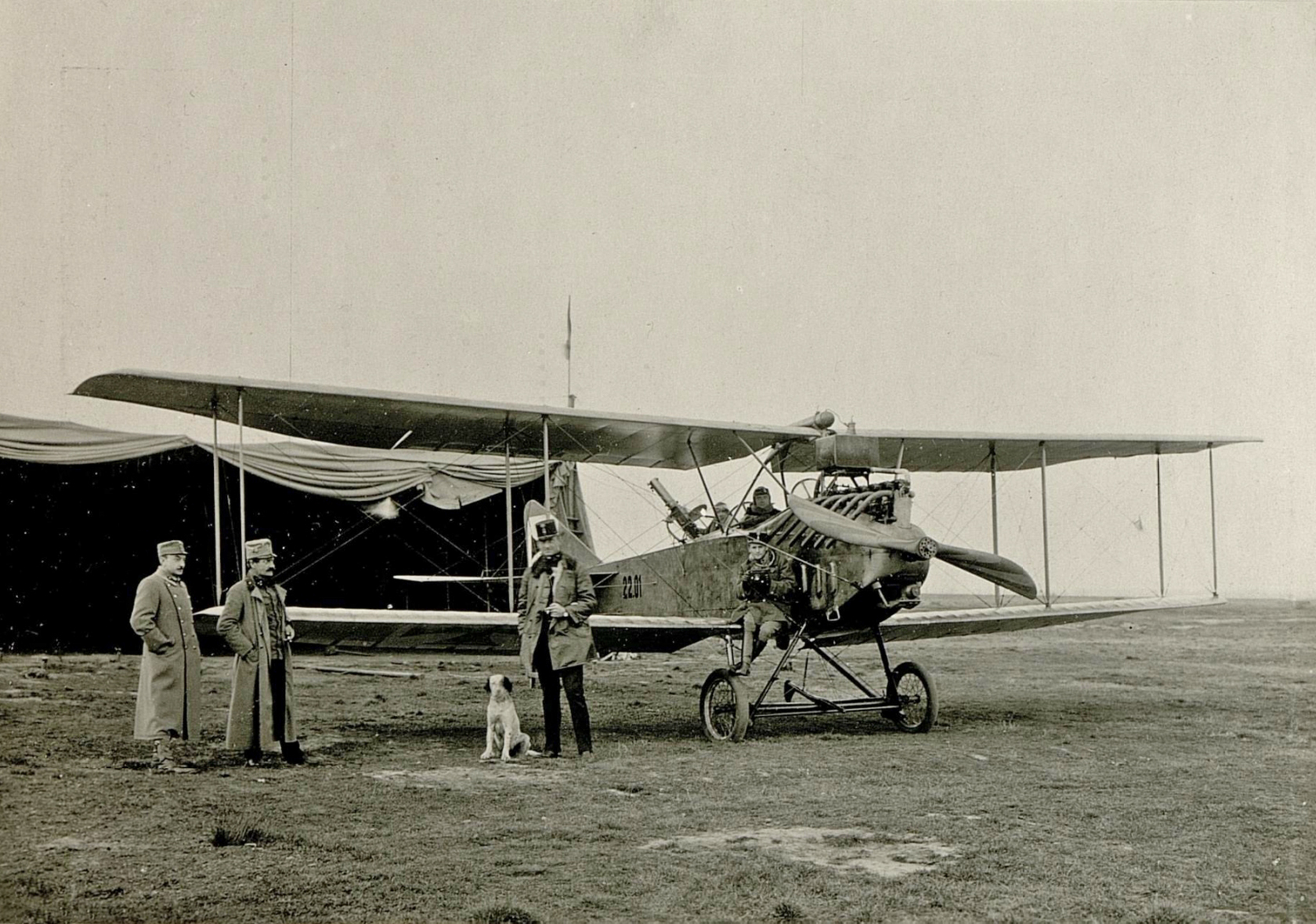
An Albatros B.I. Note the non-synchronized gun on the top wing and the free gun in rear.

On 13 June 1915, Jindra was flying as an observer for Max Libano in an unarmed Albatros B.I when the pair were attacked by two Russian Morane-Saulnier monoplanes. Despite being armed with only a pistol and a carbine, the Austro-Hungarians managed to down both attackers. On 27 August, Jindra scored again. On 1 September, he was raised to Hauptmann. Later in the year, he began to learn piloting right there in his squadron. By 11 December, he was qualified as a Feldpilot, receiving his badge on the 20th.

On 5 January 1916, Jindra fought his first dogfight as a pilot. He made a forced landing when slightly wounded, with a punctured gas tank. It was not until 29 March that he would score his first win as a pilot. On 9 April 1916, he became an ace. Three days later, he would participate in an air raid that would rattle the Russians; Jindra took Godwin Brumowski as his gunner, and they attacked a military parade being reviewed by Czar Nicholas II. They scattered the parade with seven small bombs and shot down two of the four intercepting Russian planes.

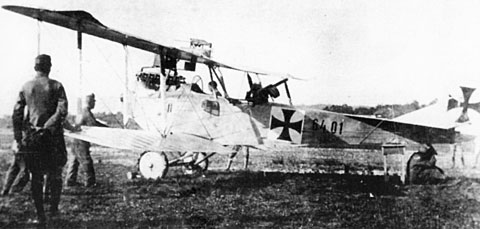
A Hansa Brandenburg C.I was Jindra's mount for his last victories.

Jindra would score twice more in 1916, but flying a Hansa-Brandenburg C.I. On 29 September, Jindra and his gunner would hit an attacking Russian pilot in the throat, and the Russian would die immediately after crash-landing. On 18 December, Jindra would swoop on a Russian observation balloon and Jindra's observer would kill the observer and destroy the balloon.

In January 1918, Jindra was reassigned to command Flek 11. However, he was soon reassigned again, to command the five squadrons of a bomber group, Fliegergruppe G. Before he could settle into this command, he was severely injured in a night flying accident, which ended his participation in the war.

== Post World War I ==
After the dissolution of the Austro-Hungarian Empire, Jindra became a Czechoslovak citizen. He was instrumental in raising a Czechoslovak Air Force. He eventually rose to become its chief of staff.

== Awards and decorations ==
- Order of the Iron Crown with War Decoration and Swords
- Two awards of the Military Merit Cross 3rd Class with War Decoration and Swords
- Bronze Military Merit Medals
- Two awards of the Silver Military Merit Medal
- Prussian Iron Cross of 1914, 2nd class
