= Pobrežje District =

City district in Maribor, northeastern Slovenia

Coordinates: 46°32′57″N 15°40′41″E

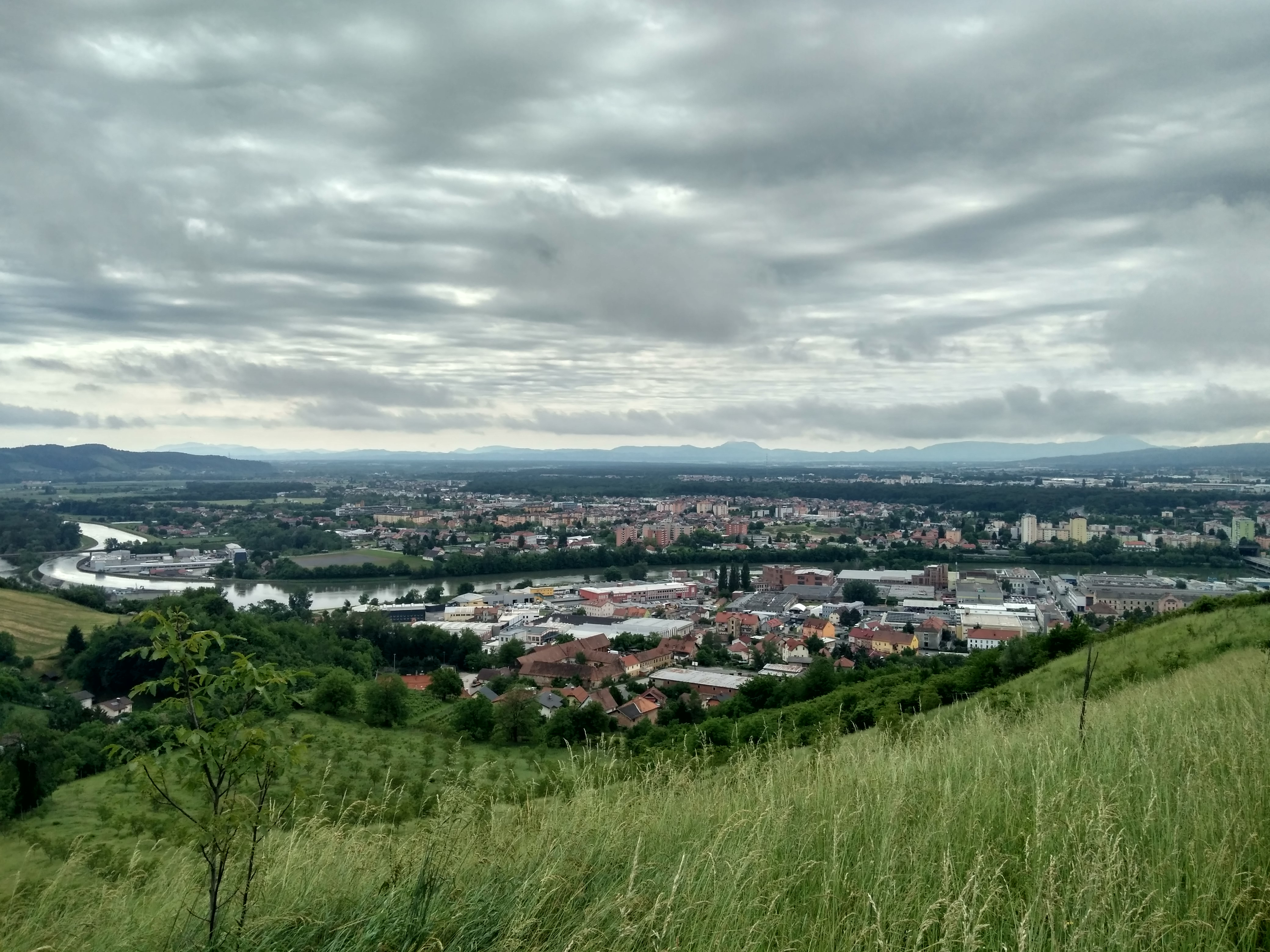
Pobrežje and part of Melje from Stolni vrh in May 2022

The Pobrežje District (pronounced [pɔˈbɾeːʒjɛ]; Slovene: Mestna četrt Pobrežje) is a city district of the City Municipality of Maribor in northeastern Slovenia. In 2014, the district had a population of 13,006. The Pobrežje District is subdivided into North Pobrežje (Slovene: Pobrežje-sever), East Pobrežje (Slovene: Pobrežje-vzhod), West Pobrežje (Slovene: Pobrežje-zahod), and South Pobrežje (Slovene: Pobrežje-jug). Maribor Cemetery, the largest cemetery in the city, is located in the district.
