= Passarella =

Passarella is a surname. Notable people with the surname include:

- Art Passarella (1909–1981), American major league baseball umpire and actor
- Daniel Passarella (born 1953), Argentine footballer
- Passarella (Guinean footballer) (born 1971), Guinean footballer and football manager
- John Passarella, American author
- Lee Passarella, American writer and senior literary editor
