= Hansa-Brandenburg D.I =

WWI German Fighter Aircraft

D.I
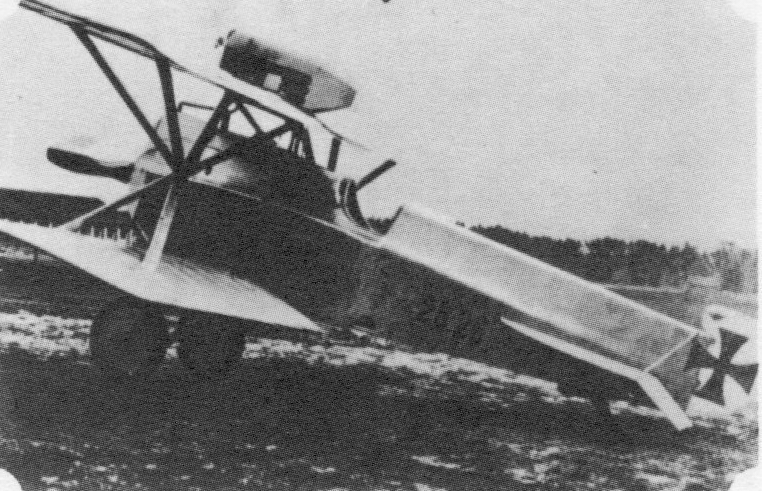

General information
- Type: Fighter
- Manufacturer: Hansa-Brandenburg
- Designer: Ernst Heinkel
- Primary users: Austria-Hungary Austria
- Number built: 122

History
- Introduction date: Autumn 1916
- First flight: 1916
- Variants: Hansa-Brandenburg KDW; Phönix D.I

The Hansa-Brandenburg D.I, also known as the KD (Kampf Doppeldecker) was a German fighter aircraft of World War I. Despite poor handling characteristics it was put into service by Austria-Hungary, where some aircraft served until the end of the war.

== Development and design ==
Ernst Heinkel chief designer of the Hansa und Brandenburgische Flugzeug-Werke developed the KD in 1916 to meet the requirements of the Austro-Hungarian Air Force (Kaiserliche und Königliche Luftfahrtruppen or K.u.K. Luftfahrtruppen). It was a single seat, single engined biplane, of wooden construction, with plywood fuselage skinning and fabric wing skins. The wings featured an unusual "Star-Strutter" arrangement of interplane struts, where four Vee struts joined in the centre of the wing bay to result in a "star" arrangement. The interplane struts themselves were steel tubes.

The KD had a deep fuselage, which gave a poor forward view for the pilot and tended to blanket the small rudder, giving poor lateral stability and making recovery from spins extremely difficult. Armament was a single Schwarzlose machine gun, which owing to difficulties in synchronising the Schwarzlose, was fitted in a fairing on the upper wing, firing over the propeller.

Despite these handling problems, the aircraft was ordered by Austro-Hungary as the D.I. A total of 122 D.Is were built, with 50 built by Hansa-Brandenburg in Germany - powered by 110 kW (150 hp) Austro-Daimler engines - while a further 72 were built under license by Phönix in Vienna, powered by 138 kW (185 hp) Austro-Daimler engines. While it was intended that the D.I also be built by Ufag, none were delivered. The KD also formed the basis for the Hansa-Brandenburg KDW floatplane fighter.

== Operational history ==
The D.I entered service in autumn 1916. Its unusual arrangement of interplane bracing gave rise to the nickname "Spider", while its poor handling gave rise to the less complementary nickname "the Coffin". The D.I was the standard fighter aircraft of the Luftfahrtruppen until mid 1917, being used by several Austro-Hungarian air aces such as Godwin Brumowski and Frank Linke-Crawford. Some Phönix built D.Is remained in use until the end of the war, being used briefly by the armed forces of The Republic of German Austria (Republik Deutschösterreich), where they were used to fight Yugoslav attacks on Klagenfurt in Carinthia.

== Operators ==
Austria-Hungary

- Kaiserliche und Königliche Luftfahrtruppen
- Austro-Hungarian Navy

Austria

- Republic of German Austria

== Specifications (D.I) ==
Data from The Complete Book of Fighters

General characteristics

- Crew: 1
- Length: 6.35 m (20 ft 10 in)
- Wingspan: 8.5 m (27 ft 11 in)
- Height: 2.79 m (9 ft 2 in)
- Wing area: 23.95 m^{2} (257.8 sq ft)
- Empty weight: 672 kg (1,482 lb)
- Gross weight: 920 kg (2,028 lb)
- Powerplant: 1 × Austro-Daimler 185hp 6-cylinder water-cooled in-line piston engine, 138 kW (185 hp)
- Propellers: 2-bladed wooden fixed-pitch propeller

Performance

- Maximum speed: 187 km/h (116 mph, 101 kn)
- Endurance: 2 hours 30 minutes
- Service ceiling: 5,000 m (16,000 ft)
- Time to altitude: 1,000 m (3,300 ft) in 3 minutes.

Armament

- 1 × 8 mm (.315 in) Schwarzlose machine gun

== See also ==
Related development

- Hansa-Brandenburg KDW
- Phönix D.I

Aircraft of comparable role, configuration, and era

- Albatros D.I
