= Kenneth Barbour Montgomery =

English flying ace

- Born: 22 October 1897; Birkenhead, Cheshire, England
- Died: 27 February 1965 (aged 67); Chester, Cheshire, England
- Military career
- Allegiance: United Kingdom
- Branch: British Army; Royal Air Force
- Service years: 1913–1919
- Rank: Captain
- Units: Cheshire Regiment; No. 45 Squadron RFC; No. 66 Squadron RFC
- Conflicts: World War I; Western Front; Italian Front
- Awards: Military Cross; Croce di Guerra (Italy)

Captain Kenneth Barbour Montgomery MC (22 October 1897 – 27 February 1965) was an English World War I flying ace officially credited with 12 aerial victories. After downing four German fighters while piloting a two-seater aircraft, he switched to a single-seater fighter for his last eight victories.

== World War I ==
Montgomery served as a sergeant in the Officers' Training Corps at Rugby School in 1913. He enlisted into the army, initially serving in the Cheshire Regiment, before joining the Royal Flying Corps. On 1 February 1917 he was posted to the Officer Cadet Wing at Denham Aerodrome, and on 2 March began his flight training at the No. 2 School of Military Aeronautics at Oxford, before being sent to No. 48 Reserve Squadron. On 29 May he was posted to No. 81 Training Squadron, and was appointed a flying officer with the rank of temporary second lieutenant (on probation).

He joined No. 45 Squadron as a Sopwith 1½ Strutter pilot, and was confirmed in his rank on 13 July, the same day he gained his first aerial victory, by driving a German Albatros D.III fighter aircraft down out of control near Polygon Wood. By 23 August, he had driven down his fourth enemy aircraft using the 1½ Strutter. He then switched to a single-seat Sopwith Camel, with which he drove down his fifth victim on 20 September 1917, and thus became an ace. He would score regularly throughout the rest of the year, sharing a triumph with future Air Vice Marshal Matthew Frew on 26 October. Montgomery racked up his tenth out of control win on 15 November 1917 over Langemarck, Belgium.

Soon afterwards his squadron was transferred to the Italian Front, where on 2 January 1918 Montgomery was appointed a flight commander with the rank of temporary captain. The following day, he scored his final win with No. 45 Squadron, driving down another Albatros D.III. Montgomery then transferred to No. 66 Squadron; he scored his twelfth win with them on 12 January 1918, driving down an Albatros D.V southeast of Fonzaso, Italy. Montgomery was awarded the Military Cross for his exploits on 3 February 1918.

Montgomery was shot down on 22 February 1918, and was listed as missing in action. His aircraft had been hit by Austro-Hungarian anti-aircraft fire and he had crash-landed in a vineyard in the village of Rustignè, Oderzo, and had been captured, badly wounded. After recovering from his injuries at the military hospital of Villa Revedin in Gorgo al Monticano, he was held as a prisoner of war in Vienna until after the armistice. He returned to England at the end of December 1918, and on 21 January 1919 he was posted to No. 4 Training Depot Station.

Montgomery was awarded the Croce di Guerra by Italian government on 8 February 1919. On 11 February 1919, he transferred to the unemployed list of the Royal Air Force.

== Awards and citations ==
Military Cross
Temporary Second Lieutenant Kenneth Harbour Montgomery.

For conspicuous gallantry and devotion to duty. He has on several occasions, during a period of three months shot down in flames four hostile machines, three of which were large high-powered two-seaters, and has driven down out of control six enemy planes. He is a most determined scout pilot, his skill and courage being of a very high order.
