= Mae Jackson =

Mae Jackson can refer to:

- Mae Jackson (politician) (1941-2005), the first elected black mayor of Waco, Texas
- Mae Jackson (poet) (born 1946), a poet, teacher and essayist.
