= Victor White =

Victor White may refer to:

- Victor White (aviator) (1895–1967), British World War I flying ace
- Victor White (priest) (1902–1960), Dominican priest
