= Alfred Haines =

Alfred Haines may refer to:

- Alfred Haines (cricketer) (1877–1935), English cricketer for Gloucestershire
- Alfred Haines (RAF officer) (1898–1918), British World War I flying ace
- Alfred Haines House on National Register of Historic Places listings in San Diego County, California

== See also ==
- Alfred Haynes (disambiguation)
