= Norman Cyril Jones =

British World War I flying ace

- Born: 8 February 1895; Cheshire, England
- Died: 23 March 1974 (aged 79); Cockermouth, Cumbria, England
- Military career
- Allegiance: United Kingdom
- Branch: British Army; Royal Air Force
- Service years: 1914–1921; 1941–1945
- Rank: Captain
- Units: 2nd East Lancashire Brigade RFA; No. 71 Squadron RFC; No. 28 Squadron RFC; No. 45 Squadron RAF
- Awards: Distinguished Flying Cross
- Other work: Interrupted his business career to return to service during World War II

Captain Norman Cyril Jones (8 February 1895 – 23 March 1974) was an English flying ace during World War I. He was credited with nine aerial victories.

== Early life ==
Norman Cyril Jones was born in Cheshire, England. His birth date is unknown; however, he would have to have been born prior to 1897 to be old enough to be commissioned into the military at the start of World War I in 1914.

== World War I ==
Jones was commissioned as a second lieutenant in the 2nd East Lancashire Brigade on 14 September 1914. He was promoted to lieutenant in the Royal Horse and Field Artillery on 1 June 1916.

On 8 June 1917, second lieutenant Jones was appointed a flying officer in the Royal Flying Corps; this appointment customarily marked graduation from pilot's training. From 21 June to 19 August 1917 he was posted to No. 71 Squadron while it was in Warwickshire. In late 1917, he was assigned to No. 28 Squadron in Italy. He scored his first aerial victory while with them, on 25 January 1918.

On 30 January 1918 Jones was appointed a flight commander with the temporary rank of captain. He subsequently transferred in theatre, to No. 45 Squadron, where he resumed his winning ways on 19 May 1918. He would run his score to nine by 21 August 1918.

He earned a Distinguished Flying Cross for his courageous service. It was gazetted on 21 September 1918:

"A gallant and skilful patrol leader who has proved successful on many occasions against numerically superior enemy formations. Capt. Jones has personally destroyed six enemy machines this year."

Needless to say, the award citation was based on incomplete information, as Jones' victory list shows.

== List of aerial victories ==
Victories
| No. | Date/time | Aircraft | Foe | Result | Location | Notes |
|---|---|---|---|---|---|---|
| 1 | 25 January 1918 @ 1045 hours | Sopwith Camel serial number B6344 | Aviatik reconnaissance aircraft | Destroyed | Sernaglia–San Pietro | |
| 2 | 19 May 1918 @ 0625 hours | Sopwith Camel s/n B6372 | Reconnaissance aircraft | Set afire; destroyed | Mel, Veneto | Shared with 2nd Lt. Charles Gray Catto |
| 3 | 20 May 1918 @ 1040 hours | Sopwith Camel s/n B6372 | Albatros D.III | Destroyed | Northeast of Asiago | |
| 4 | 1 June 1918 @ 0945 hours | Sopwith Camel s/n B6372 | Albatros D.V | Set afire; destroyed | Feltre | |
| 5 | 7 June 1918 @ 1740 hours | Sopwith Camel s/n B6372 | DFW reconnaissance aircraft | Destroyed | Arsiero | |
| 6 | 28 June 1918 @ 0835 hours | Sopwith Camel s/n D8169 | Albatros D.III | Destroyed | A mile west of Pedavena | |
| 7 | 29 July 1918 @ approx. 0900 hours | Sopwith Camel s/n D8169 | Albatros D.III | Destroyed | Brugnera | |
| 8 | 21 August 1918 @ 0815 hours | Sopwith Camel s/n D8234 | Albatros D.V | Destroyed | Ghiarona | |
| 9 | 21 August 1918 @ 0815 hours | Sopwith Camel s/n D8234 | Albatros D.V | Driven down out of control | Ghiarona | |

== Between the World Wars ==
On 23 January 1919, Jones was placed on the RAF's unemployed list. His assignment to the RAF was ended and he was returned to the Royal Horse and Royal Field Artillery of the Territorial Force. He gave up his commission on 30 September 1921.

As Jones left the military, he moved into the business world. He was involved in the reorganization of the family business in March 1920, which established John Jones as chairman.

== World War II and beyond ==
He rejoined the RAF for World War II; on 23 February 1941 he was commissioned as an acting probationary pilot officer for "the duration of hostilities...."

== Bibliography ==
- Shores, Christopher F.; Franks, Norman & Guest, Russell F. (1990). Above the Trenches: a Complete Record of the Fighter Aces and Units of the British Empire Air Forces 1915–1920. London, UK: Grub Street. ISBN 978-0-948817-19-9.
