= Geoffrey Hornblower Cock =

British flying ace (1896–1980)

- Born: 7 January 1896; Shrewsbury, England
- Died: 16 February 1980 (aged 84); 4 High Street, Belford, Northumberland, England
- Military career
- Allegiance: United Kingdom
- Branch: British Army; Royal Air Force
- Service years: 1915–1943
- Rank: Group Captain
- Units: Artists Rifles; No. 25 Reserve Squadron RFC; No. 45 Squadron RFC
- Commands: No. 9 Squadron RAF
- Conflicts: World War I World War II
- Awards: Military Cross

Group Captain Geoffrey Hornblower Cock MC (7 January 1896 – 16 February 1980) was a British World War I flying ace credited with thirteen aerial victories. He was the highest scoring ace to fly the Sopwith 1½ Strutter.

== Military career ==
Cock joined the 28th Battalion of the Artists Rifles Officers' Training Corps in December 1915. He transferred to the Royal Flying Corps on 3 June 1916 with the rank of temporary second lieutenant. He trained with 25 Squadron until receiving Pilot's Certificate No. 2157 in September, was appointed a flying officer; then was forwarded to 45 Squadron. The unit moved to France on 14 October 1916 to operate Sopwith 1½ Strutters.

Cock's first victories came on 6 April 1917, when he destroyed an Albatros D.III and drove another down out of control. He then used his two-seater for a string of successful combats lasting through 22 July; he flew with no fewer than seven different observers manning his guns, the most notable of whom was Victor White. On 22 July, on his 97th combat sortie, he set an Albatros D.V afire, then was himself shot down by Hauptmann Wilhelm Reinhard of Jasta 11 to start Reinhard's career. Cock was the last survivor of the 45 Squadron pilots who had come to France nine months prior. He also survived being shot down, becoming a prisoner of war. His attempt to escape was unsuccessful, and he was not repatriated until December 1918. The final tally of his victories was five Albatros D.Vs destroyed, including one shared with fellow ace William Wright and his observer Edward Caufield-Kelly, and eight driven down out of control.

Along with Geoffrey Cock, three other British pilots scored all of their victories solely on the Strutter: George Walker Blaiklock (5), John Thompson Guy Murison (5) and John Arthur Vessey (5).

Cock remained in the Royal Air Force postwar. He was promoted from flight lieutenant to squadron leader on 1 January 1928, and to wing commander on 1 January 1935. He commanded 9 Squadron at RAF Boscombe Down in 1935. Promoted to group captain on 1 November 1938, he served during World War II, until retiring in 1943.

== Honours and awards ==
Military Cross
Temporary Second Lieutenant Geoffrey Hornblower Cock, General List and Royal Flying Corps.
For conspicuous gallantry and devotion to duty. On many occasions he showed great courage and determination in attacking and destroying hostile aircraft, and in dispersing hostile troops from a low altitude. His skill as a formation leader has set a fine example to the other pilots of his squadron.

== Bibliography ==
- Shores, Christopher F.; Franks, Norman & Guest, Russell (1990). Above the Trenches: A Complete Record of the Fighter Aces and Units of the British Empire Air Forces 1915–1920. London, UK: Grub Street. ISBN 0-948817-19-4.
