= John Cowe McIntosh =

Lieutenant John Cowe McIntosh AFC
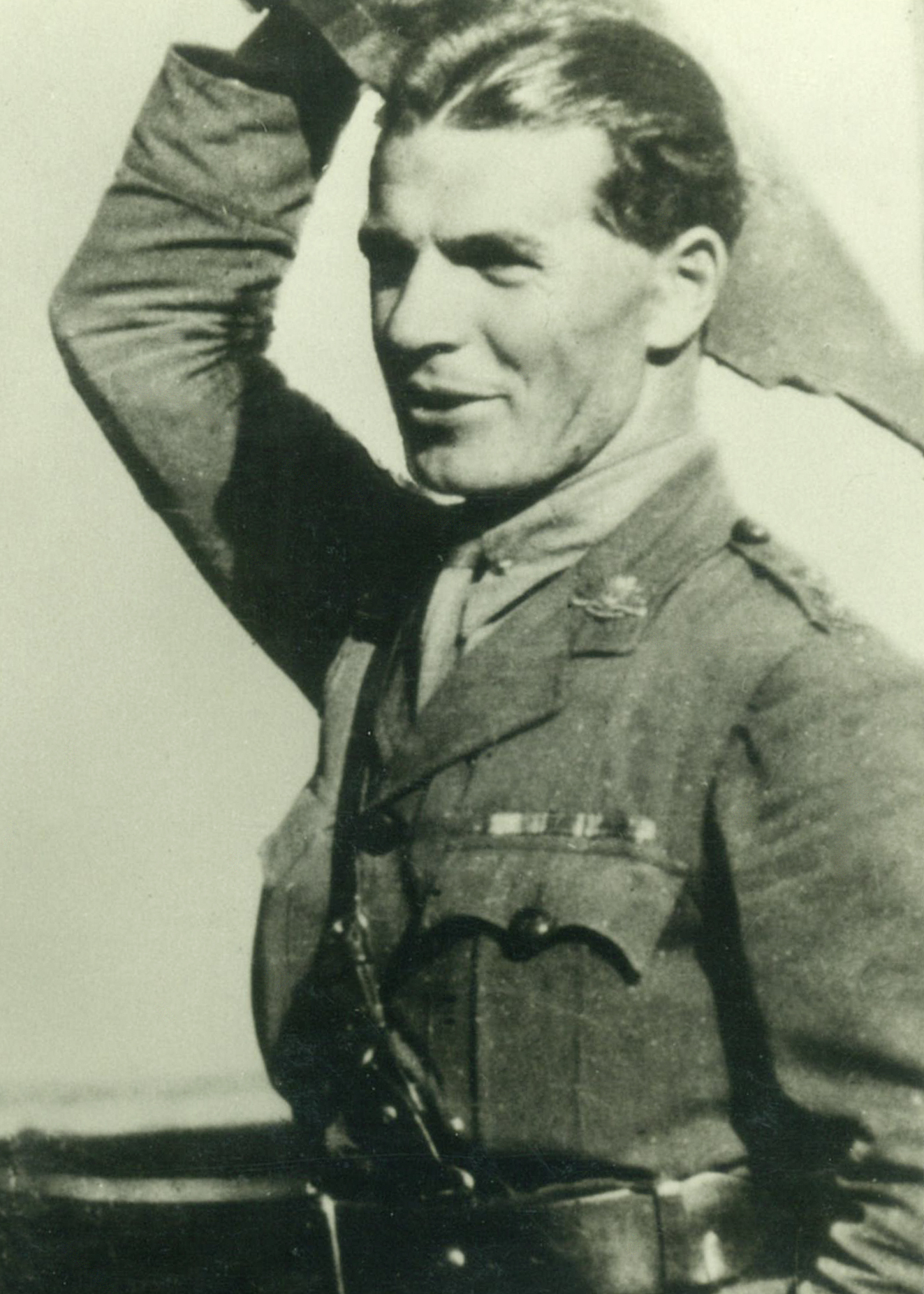
- McIntosh at Flemington Racecourse, 1920
- Born: 24 February 1892; Lumsden, Aberdeenshire, Scotland
- Died: 28 March 1921 (aged 29); Pithara, Western Australia
- Occupation: Aviator

John Cowe McIntosh AFC (24 February 1892 – 28 March 1921) was a Scottish-born Australian aviator.

McIntosh was born near the village of Lumsden, Aberdeenshire. He emigrated to Western Australia in 1911 and worked in the timber industry until the outbreak of World War I in 1914 when he enlisted in the Australian Army Medical Corps. With the 4th Field Ambulance he landed at Gallipoli as a stretcher bearer, lasting seventeen weeks before illness forced a return to England, where he reached the rank of corporal. In 1918 he served six months in northern France until he transferred to the Australian Flying Corps and began flying training near Oxford. He was commissioned a second lieutenant in April 1919 and was later promoted to lieutenant.

In March 1919, the Australian government offered a prize of £10,000 for the first successful flight from England to Australia crewed by Australian airmen. McIntosh paired with another Australian Flying Corps officer, Ray Parer, and, although leaving well after the event had been won, they arrived in Darwin on 2 August 1920 - 208 days after departing England. Their aircraft was an Airco DH-9, and they were the only other entrant to successfully complete the race, though not without great hardship and misadventure. Prime Minister Billy Hughes presented each airman a cheque for £500 at a ceremony at Flemington Racecourse, Melbourne on 31 August 1920, such was the acclaim and admiration from the Australian public. McIntosh and Parer were subsequently awarded the Air Force Cross for this feat on 23 November 1920. For a short time they enjoyed a spell of great fame.

McIntosh returned to Western Australia in December 1920 in yet another adventure: the first continental crossing by motorbike from Melbourne to Perth. The journey took five weeks.

On 28 March 1921, while conducting joy flights, McIntosh was killed in an air crash at Pithara, Western Australia. It was the first fatal air crash in the state. His death was keenly felt and thousands of mourners attended his funeral procession and burial at Karrakatta cemetery.

An inquest into the crash ruled his death as accidental, though several witnesses testified to observing (through binoculars) the unruly behaviour in flight of one of the passengers, leading to speculation that McIntosh may have been pulled back from the controls or otherwise distracted.

A public subscription raised £4300 for a suitable memorial and financial support for his wife, child and mother.

On 21 October 2023, more than a hundred years after their epic flight, McIntosh and Parer were finally inducted into the Australian Aviation Hall of Fame.

== Bibliography ==
- Cooksley, Peter (Spring 1994). "Erratic Their Course". Air Enthusiast. No. 53. pp. 53–59. ISSN 0143-5450.
