= William Wright (Indian civil servant) =

British World War I flying ace

William Alan Wright
- Born: 27 November 1895; Frisby on the Wreake, Leicestershire, England
- Died: 26 April 1990 (aged 94); Hawthorn, Victoria, Australia
- Military career
- Allegiance: United Kingdom
- Branch: British Army; Royal Air Force
- Service years: 1915–1919; 1945–1946
- Rank: Captain
- Unit: No. 45 Squadron RFC
- Conflicts: World War I • Western Front; World War II
- Awards: Order of the Indian Empire; Air Force Cross; Order of the Crown (Belgium); Croix de guerre (Belgium)

Captain William Alan Wright CIE AFC (27 November 1895 – 26 April 1990) was a British World War I flying ace credited with eight aerial victories and later a senior member of the Indian Civil Service.

== Early life and background ==
Wright was born in Frisby on the Wreake, Leicestershire, the son of the Reverend Thomas Wright, who was the vicar there, and his wife Annie. He was educated at Oundle School.

== World War I ==
Wright was commissioned as a temporary second lieutenant in the infantry on 4 January 1915 and served in the Leicestershire Regiment, until training as a pilot and being appointed a flying officer in the Royal Flying Corps on 16 March 1917. He was posted to No. 45 Squadron RFC to fly the Sopwith 1½ Strutter two-seater, and was shot down by Max Ritter von Müller on 30 April 1917, but survived. Wright gained his first aerial victory on 9 May, sharing with another aircraft of his squadron in the destruction of an Albatros D.III fighter. On 24 May he destroyed two more D.IIIs, and sent a fourth down on flames on 28 May. He was promoted to lieutenant on 1 July 1917.

His squadron was then re-equipped with the Sopwith Camel single-seat fighter, and on 1 September 1917 Wright was appointed a flight commander with the temporary rank of captain. He gained his fifth victory, making him an 'ace', on 5 September by driving down a DFW reconnaissance aircraft. He then accounted for two more reconnaissance aircraft on 11 and 20 September. Finally, on 1 October, he shared with a crew from No. 53 Squadron RFC in the capture of an Albatros D.V.

Wright was made a Chevalier of the Ordre de la Couronne by the King of the Belgians, receiving unrestricted permission to wear the decoration by The King on 21 September 1917, and receiving similar permission to wear the Croix de guerre, also awarded by Belgium, on 11 March 1918. In the 1919 New Year Honours Wright was awarded the Air Force Cross. He was transferred to the RAF unemployed list on 27 February 1919.

=== List of aerial victories ===
Combat record
| No. | Date/Time | Aircraft/ Serial No. | Opponent | Result | Location | Notes |
|---|---|---|---|---|---|---|
| 1 | 9 May 1917 @ 1700 | Sopwith 1½ Strutter (A8225) | Albatros D.III | Destroyed | North-west of Seclin | Observer: Second Lieutenant Edward Caulfield Kelly. Shared with Lieutenant Geoffrey Cock & Second Lieutenant John Murison. |
| 2 | 24 May 1917 @ 1945 | Sopwith 1½ Strutter (A8269) | Albatros D.III | Destroyed in flames | Zonnebeke | Observer: Second Lieutenant Edward Caulfield Kelly. |
| 3 | 24 May 1917 @ 1945 | Sopwith 1½ Strutter (A8269) | Albatros D.III | Destroyed | Zonnebeke | Observer: Second Lieutenant Edward Caulfield Kelly. |
| 4 | 28 May 1917 @ 1345 | Sopwith 1½ Strutter (A8269) | Albatros D.III | Destroyed in flames | Comines | Observer: Second Lieutenant Edward Caulfield Kelly. |
| 5 | 5 September 1917 @ 0800 | Sopwith Camel | DFW C | Out of control | Comines | |
| 6 | 11 September 1917 @ 1830 | Sopwith Camel | C | Out of control | South-east of Moorslede | |
| 7 | 20 September 1917 @ 1145 | Sopwith Camel (B3903) | C | Destroyed | Westroosebeke | |
| 8 | 1 October 1917 @ 1600 | Sopwith Camel | Albatros D.V | Captured | East of Polygon Wood | Shared with Lieutenant R. Reeder & Corporal G. Holmes of No. 53 Squadron RFC. |

== Post-war career ==
After the war, on 5 September 1921, he entered the Indian Civil Service. In the 1945 Birthday Honours Wright, then Officiating Joint Secretary in the War Department of the Government of India, was made a Companion of the Order of the Indian Empire.

On 1 July 1945 he was granted an emergency commission in the Army in Burma Reserve of Officers (ABRO) with the rank of second lieutenant. He eventually relinquished his commission on 20 January 1946, and was granted the honorary rank of lieutenant-colonel.

William Alan Wright died in Hawthorn, Victoria, on 26 April 1990.
