= 1919 England to Australia flight =

1919 air race

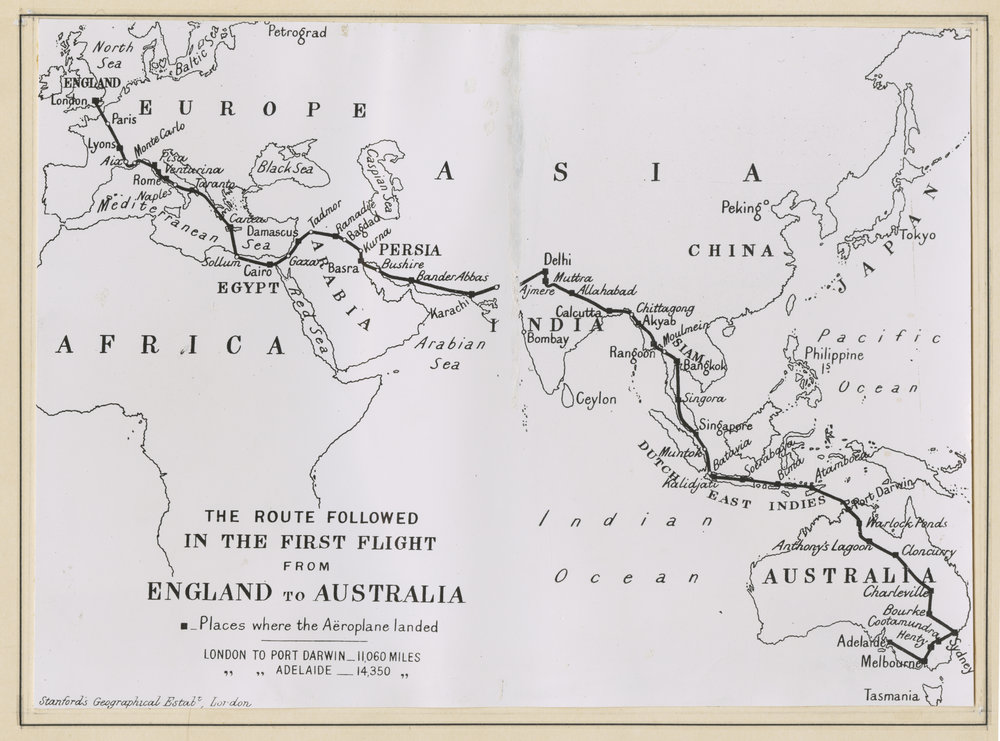
Route of the England to Australia flight, starting in London and finishing in Adelaide (1919)

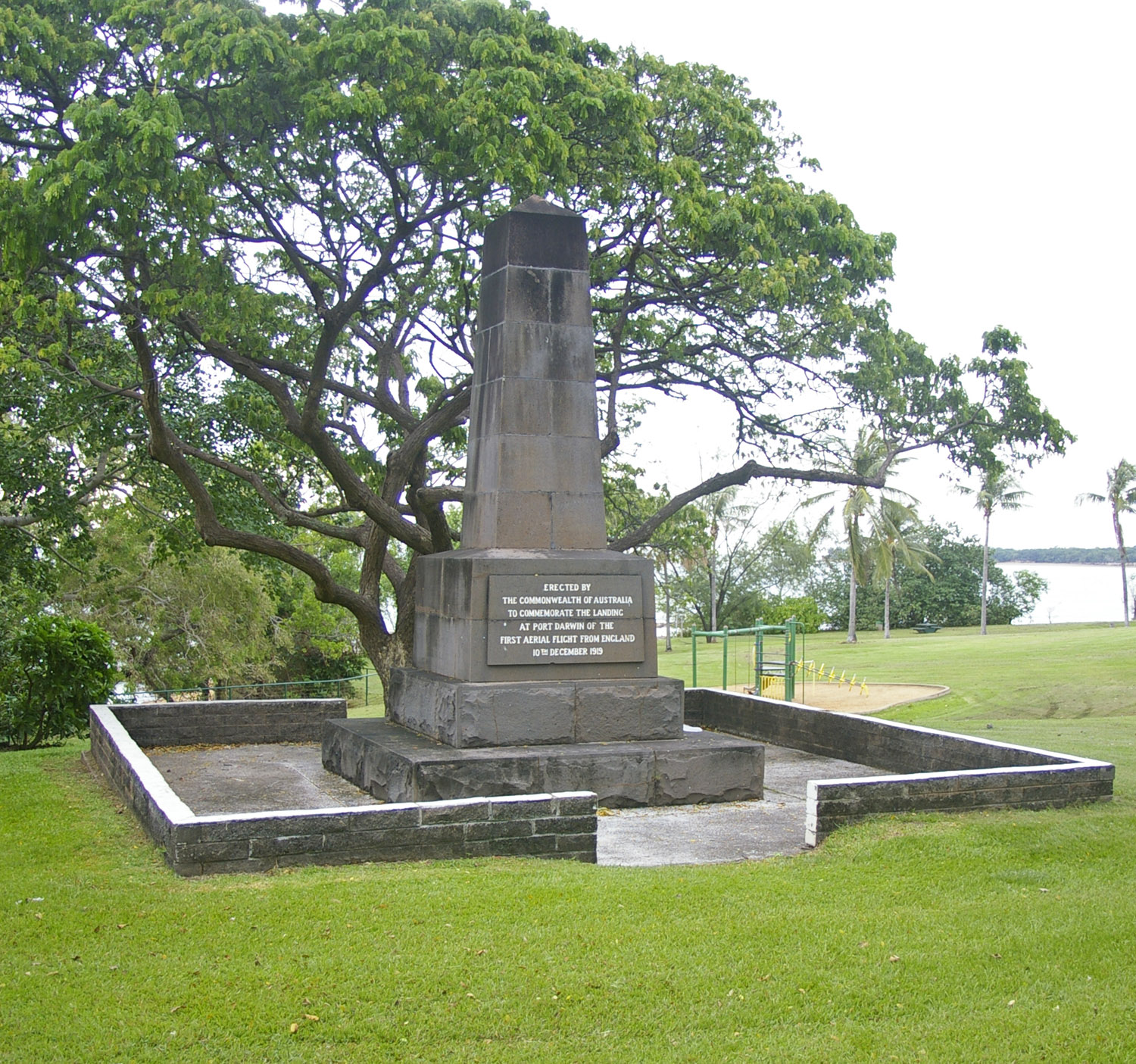
First Flight from England to Australia by Australians Monument in Darwin, Northern Territory, Australia

The first ever flight from the United Kingdom to Australia, sometimes known as The Great Air Race, took place in 1919. Of the six entries that started the race, the winners were South Australian brothers Ross and Keith Smith, serving as pilot and co-pilot respectively. They were also accompanied by mechanics James Bennett and Wally Shiers, all of whom made the successful journey of 14,350 kilometres (8,917 mi; 7,748 nmi) from London to Adelaide in a modified Vickers Vimy bomber. One other entrant reached Australia; the other four crashed en route, two of whose crews were killed.

Although the race had finished upon reaching Australia in Darwin, an extra leg of 3,290 kilometres (2,044 mi; 1,776 nmi) to the Smith brothers' hometown of Adelaide was undertaken. The prize-winning Vickers Vimy aircraft is displayed in a climate-controlled museum of the same name, in Adelaide Airport.

== The competition ==
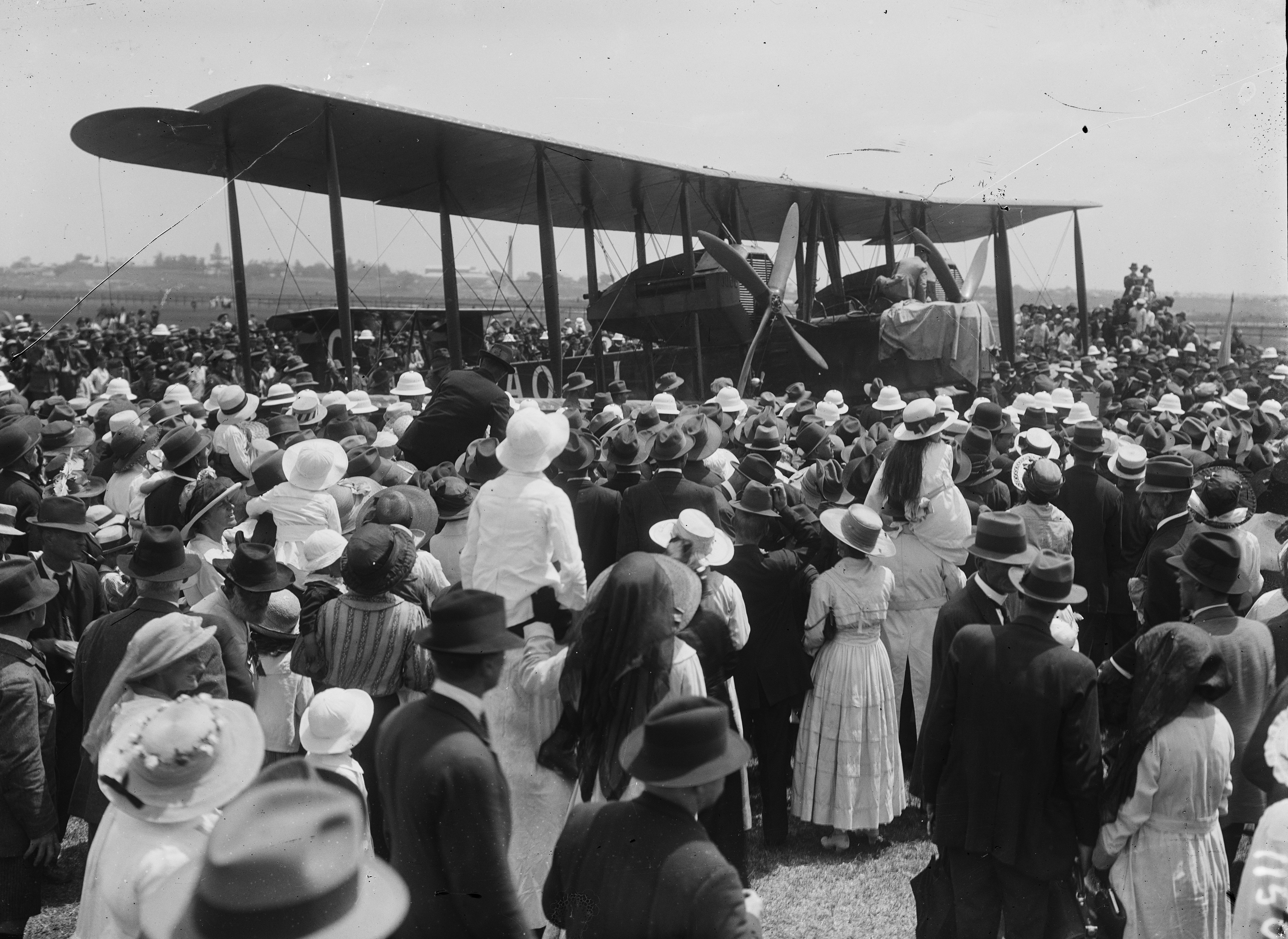
Ross and Keith Smith, Mascot, Sydney, 1920

In early 1919, the Commonwealth Government of Australia offered a prize of £A10,000 for the first flight from Great Britain to Australia in a British aircraft, under specific conditions. In May 1919, Billy Hughes, Prime Minister of Australia, and Senator George Pearce, Australian Minister for Defence, in consultation with the Royal Aero Club, stated that valid aircrews must all be Australian nationals, the aircraft must have been constructed in the British Empire, and the journey must be completed within 720 consecutive hours (30 days) and be completed before midnight on 31 December 1920. The departure point must be either Hounslow Heath Aerodrome (for landplanes) or RNAS Calshot (for seaplanes and flying boats), with reporting points at Alexandria and Singapore, and final destination in the region of Darwin. Each flight was to take place under the competition rules of the Royal Aero Club, which would supervise the start and control the competition generally.

== Contestants ==
=== Sopwith Wallaby ===
At 11:44 a.m. on 21 October 1919, Captain George Campbell Matthews AFC as pilot, and Sergeant Thomas D. Kay as mechanic, took off from Hounslow Heath Aerodrome in a Sopwith Wallaby (G-EAKS). Bad weather caused delays at Cologne and Vienna, then they were imprisoned as suspected Bolsheviks in Yugoslavia, with further delays due to snow at Belgrade. A cracked engine cylinder at Constantinople, and bad weather at Aleppo caused more delays. Finally, on 17 April 1920, the Wallaby crashed on landing at Grokgak, on Bali. Matthews was slightly injured.

=== Vickers Vimy ===
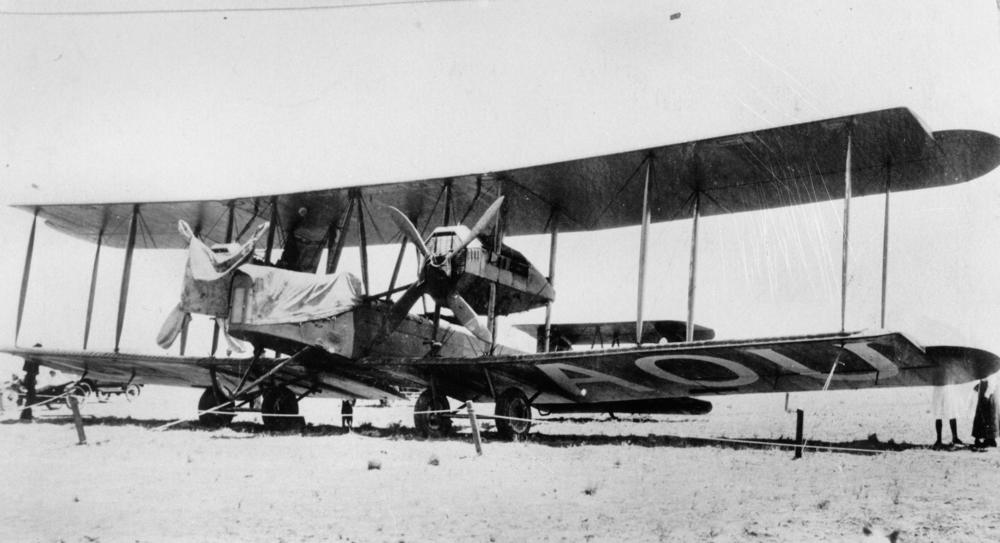
The winning Vickers Vimy, 1919

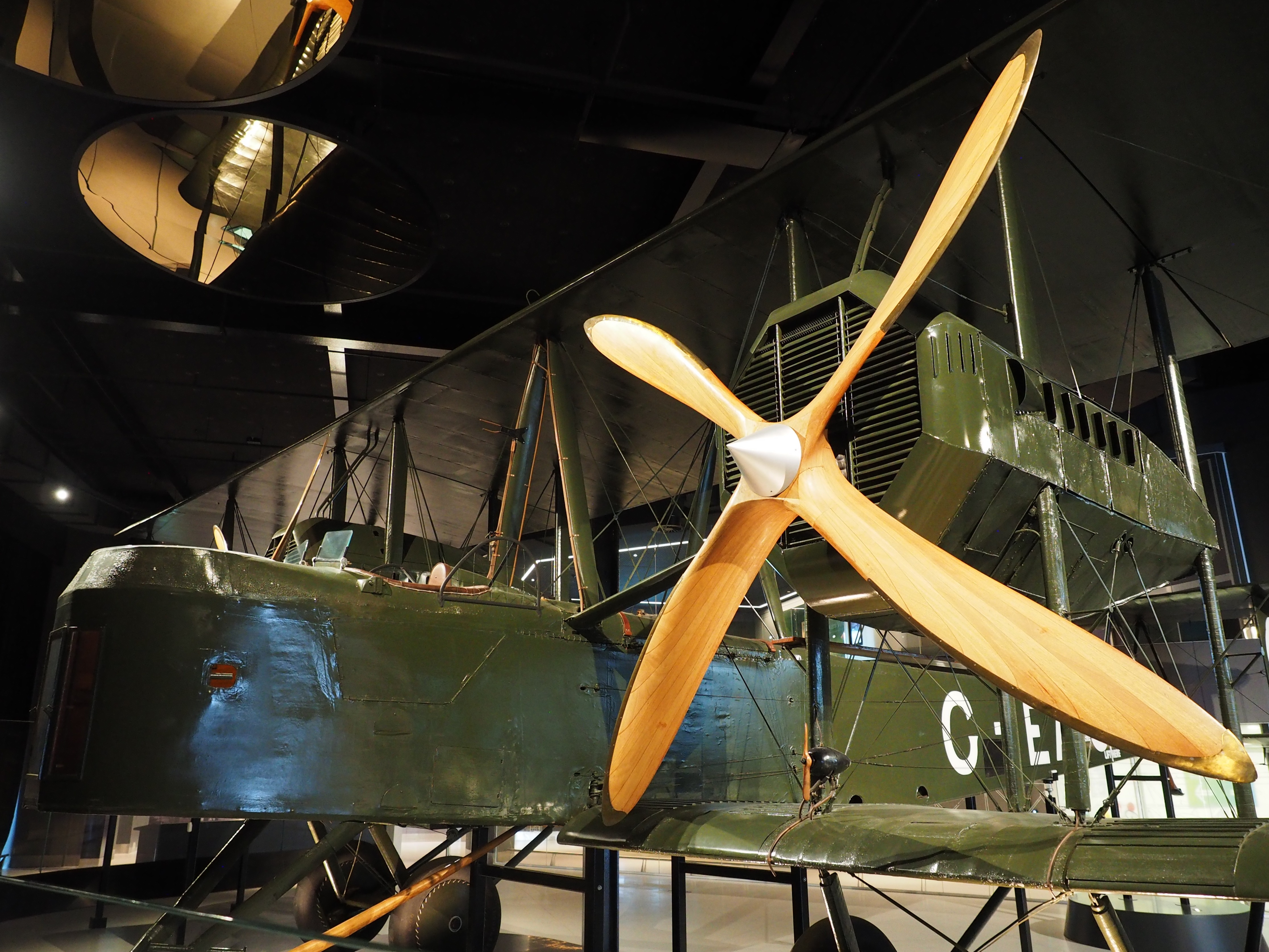
The winning aircraft, preserved at Adelaide Airport, in 2025

Vickers entered a converted Vimy bomber (G-EAOU) (the registration being whimsically said to stand for "God 'elp all of us"), crewed by Captain Ross Macpherson Smith with his brother Lieutenant Keith Macpherson Smith as co-pilot and mechanics Sergeant W.H. (Wally) Shiers and Sergeant J.M. (Jim) Bennett. The Vimy left Hounslow Heath at 8:30 a.m. on 12 November 1919. It flew via Lyon, Rome, Cairo, Damascus, Basra, Karachi, Delhi, Calcutta, Akyab, Rangoon racecourse, Singora (Songkhla) (in Siam unscheduled in heavy rain), Singapore, Batavia and Surabaya where the aircraft was bogged and had to make use of a temporary airstrip made from bamboo mats, reaching Darwin at 4:10 p.m. on 10 December 1919. The flight distance was estimated as 17,911 kilometres (11,129 mi) and total flying time was 135 hours 55 minutes (131.8 km/h or 81.9 mph). The prize money was shared between the Smith brothers and the two mechanics, with the Smith brothers additionally receiving a knighthood for this exploit, the company presented their aircraft to the Australian government. It is now displayed at Adelaide Airport, 15 kilometres (9 mi) south of the Smith brother's birthplace, Semaphore.

=== Alliance P.2 ===
On 13 November 1919, Lieutenant Roger M. Douglas, MC DCM and Lieutenant J.S.L. Ross took off from Hounslow Heath in an Alliance P.2 Seabird (G-EAOX) named 'Endeavour'. It crashed in an orchard in Surbiton; Ross was killed outright, and Douglas died soon after of his injuries.

=== Blackburn Kangaroo ===
A team with a Blackburn Kangaroo (G-EAOW) had selected as navigator the Australian aviator Charles Kingsford Smith. Smith withdrew from the contest, and Captain Hubert Wilkins MC and bar took his place. On 21 November 1919, the Kangaroo took off from Hounslow Heath, piloted by Lieutenant V. Rendle with Captain Wilkins, Lieutenant D.R. Williams and Lieutenant Garnsey St. C. Potts as crew. Problems were experienced with the engines, and the plane was forced down over France. Repairs were made and the flight continued, still with engine problems. On 8 December 1919, the aircraft crash-landed at Suda Bay, Crete, ending up against the fence of a mental hospital. The crew escaped without injury.

=== Martinsyde Type A ===
On 5 December 1919, Captain Cedric E. Howell and Lieutenant George Henry Fraser left London in a Martinsyde Type A Mk.I (G-EAMR) aircraft. On 9 December, the aircraft disappeared near Corfu. The wreckage and Howell's body were found offshore, but Fraser's body was never found.

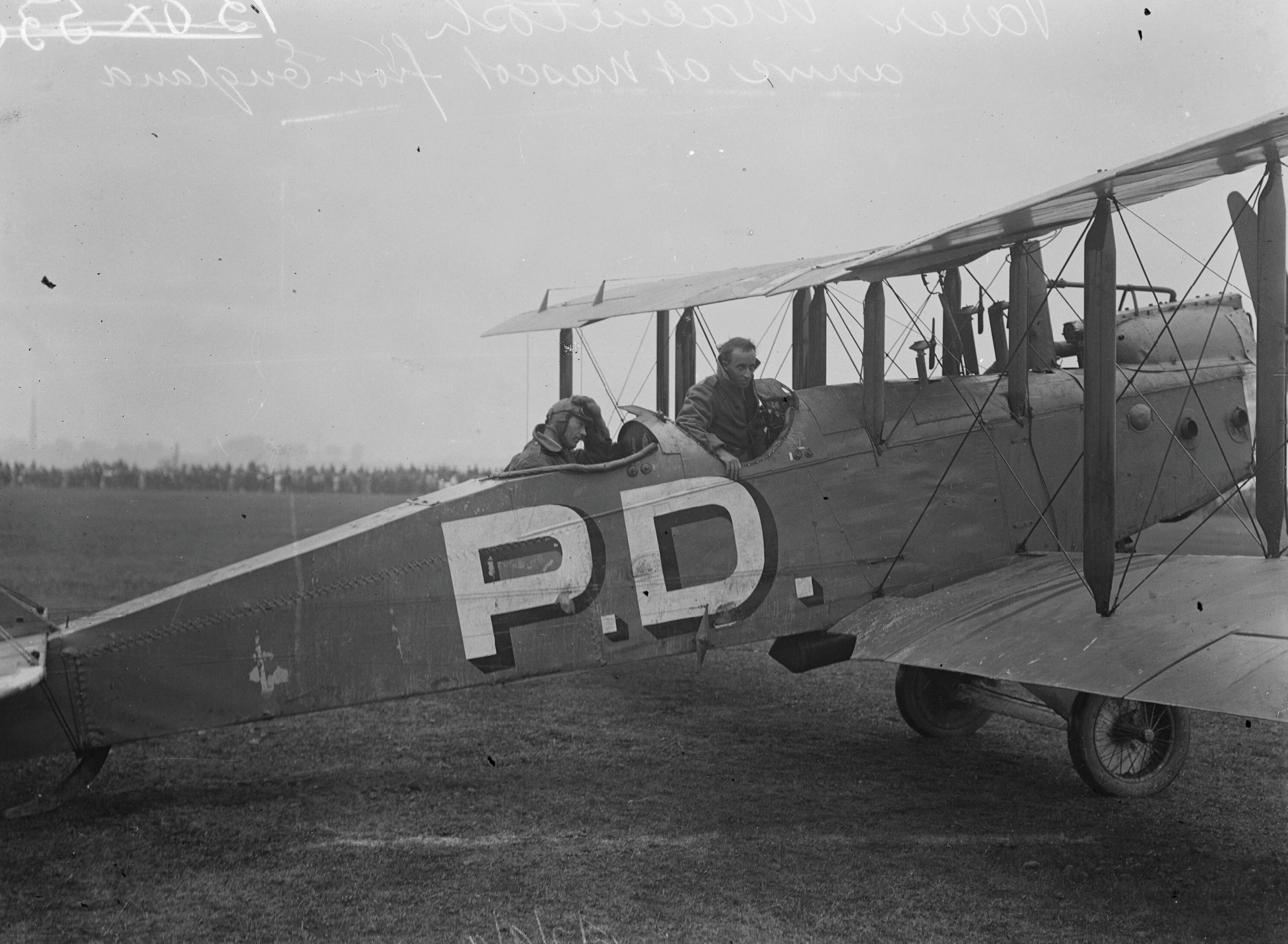
Lieutenants Parer and McIntosh's arrival in Mascot Aerodrome on completing a flight from England, Sydney, 21 August 1920.

=== Airco DH.9 ===
On 8 January 1920, Airco DH.9 (G-EAQM), piloted by Lieutenant Ray Parer, with co-pilot Lieutenant John Cowe McIntosh, took off from Hounslow Heath. The aircraft completed the flight, the first by a single-engined machine, 206 days later on 2 August 1920, earning Parer the sobriquet "Battling Ray". Although outside the time limit, the crew was awarded a consolation prize of £A1,000, second only to the Vimy. The DH.9 has been restored and placed on display at the Australian War Memorial at Canberra. The story is detailed in the book "Flight and Adventures of Parer and McIntosh" written by Emily Charnwood and first published in 1921. The machine is labelled PD after its sponsor, millionaire Peter Dawson, a whisky manufacturer, who financed the purchase of the machine and much of the journey. Parer later took part in a similar journey, the MacRobertson Trophy Air Race in 1934.

== See also ==
- MacRobertson Air Race

See: Long Flight Home by Lanie Anderson (2019)

== Bibliography ==
- Cooksley, Peter (Spring 1994). "Erratic Their Course". Air Enthusiast. No. 53. pp. 53–59. ISSN 0143-5450.
- Jackson, A. J. 1973. British Civil Aircraft since 1919, Volume 2. Putnam ISBN 0-370-10010-7.
- Lewis, Peter. 1970. British Racing and Record-Breaking Aircraft. Putnam ISBN 0-370-00067-6
- Sherwood, Tim. 1999. Coming in to Land: A Short History of Hounslow, Hanworth and Heston Aerodromes 1911–1946. Heritage Publications (Hounslow Library) ISBN 1-899144-30-7
