= George Henry Fraser =

Australian navigator and aircraft mechanic

- Born: c. 1880; Macorna, Australia
- Died: 9 December 1919 (Note: There is a discrepancy between the dates given in different sources (9 or 10 December) for the aircraft's departure from Taranto and, therefore, the date of Howell's and Fraser's subsequent drowning. It appears from the preponderance of sources that the aircraft left on 9 December 1919 CET. This is the date given for Howell's and Fraser's deaths on, respectively, the "Commemorative Roll: Cedric Howell". Australian War Memorial. and "Roll of Honour: George Henry Fraser". Australian War Memorial. Other sources (e.g. the Sydney Morning Herald of 16 December 1919, cited below, or Cooke, T. H. (1983). "Howell, Cedric Ernest (1896–1919)". Australian Dictionary of Biography. National Centre of Biography, Australian National University. ISBN 978-0-522-84459-7. ISSN 1833-7538. OCLC 70677943.) give 10 December 1919 as the relevant date. If this reflects a difference in time zones then, according to the Wikipedia Manual of Style, the 9 December ought to be preferred, as the date and time appropriate to the place where the event occurred.); St George's Bay, Corfu
- Military career
- Allegiance: Australia
- Branch: Australian Imperial; Australian Flying Corps
- Service years: 1917–1919
- Rank: Air Mechanic, 2nd Class
- Unit: Fifth Training Squadron, AFC
- Conflicts: First World War
- Other work: Rolls-Royce Ltd

George Henry Fraser (c. 1880 – 9 December 1919) was a navigator and aircraft mechanic who flew with pilot Cedric Howell as one of the teams competing in the England to Australia air race in December 1919. Howell and Fraser's aircraft made a forced landing in the St George's Bay, Corfu; both men are presumed to have drowned as a result, although only Howell's body was ever recovered.

== Personal life ==
Fraser's exact date of birth is not given in the sources available, but he is variously stated to have been either 39 or 40 years old at the time of his death. He was the child of Robert Fraser (died 27 March 1894, aged 46) and Mary Fraser (died 15 March 1937, aged 92). He was born in Macorna, Victoria, Australia and attended Macorna State School. On leaving school, Fraser became a bicycle and motor mechanic and, before enlisting in 1917, he worked for several years in his brother William Fraser's car import firm, Messrs Fraser and Willsford of Sydney, Australia, where he was residing at the time of his enlistment. Fraser was unmarried at the time he enlisted and at the date of his death.

== Military service ==
Fraser enlisted as a private in the Australian Imperial Force on 12 March 1917 and was assigned, as an air mechanic, 2nd class, to the Fifth Training Squadron, Australian Flying Corps. He subsequently served in England with the Fifth Training Squadron and the No 1 School of Navigation and Bomb Dropping, Royal Air Force, gaining much experience of the maintenance and operation of bomber aircraft and of aerial navigation.

== Post-war ==
For the six months before he started with Howell on the race to Australia, Fraser had been employed by Rolls-Royce Ltd, during which time he had become familiar with engines of the type fitted in the plane in which he was to compete.

== Final flight ==
In August 1919 the British aircraft manufacturer Martinsyde Ltd invited Australian flying ace Captain Cedric Howell to pilot their Type A Mk.I in the forthcoming England to Australia air race. As a qualified navigator and a mechanic familiar with the Rolls-Royce engine fitted to the plane, Fraser was selected to accompany Captain Howell. Having departed from Taranto on the next stage of the flight, Howell's and Fraser's aircraft made a forced landing St George's Bay, Corfu. It was initially falsely reported, in telegram received by William Fraser, that his brother had been rescued and had arrived safely in Athens. Although the circumstances of the accident are not clear, it appears that both were alive and survived in the water but that they subsequently drowned. Only Howell's body was ever recovered. It was subsequently claimed that Howell drowned while attempting to tow Fraser to shore, since the mechanic was unable to swim.

== Memorials ==
Fraser's name is included in the Hollybrook Memorial, Southampton, England and he is commemorated on a family headstone in White Hills Cemetery, White Hills, Victoria. His name is also included in the Australian War Memorial Roll of Honour.

== See also ==
- List of people who disappeared at sea

== Notes ==
Footnotes

Citations
