= Harry G. E. Luchford =

Harry George Ernest Luchford
- Born: 28 October 1894; Lucknow, India
- Died: 2 December 1917 (aged 23); Becelaere, Belgium
- Burial place: Arras Flying Services Memorial, Pas de Calais, France
- Military career
- Allegiance: United Kingdom
- Branch: British Army
- Service years: 1914–1917
- Rank: Captain
- Nickname: "Huge"
- Units: Norfolk Regiment; Army Service Corps; Royal Flying Corps
- Conflicts: World War I • Western Front
- Awards: Military Cross & Bar

Captain Harry George Ernest Luchford MC* (28 October 1894 – 2 December 1917) was an English World War I pilot credited with 24 victories. He was notable for scoring his first 11 victories in three months while piloting an obsolete double-seated FE.2 pusher aircraft.

== Family background and early life ==
His father George James Luchford (1868–1939) was born in Rochester, Kent, and served in India as Garrison Quartermaster Sergeant with the 1st Battalion, East Lancashire Regiment. There, in Colaba, in 1894, he married Helena Elizabeth Hunnisett (1875–1946), born in Chatham, Kent. They had three sons: Harry George Ernest, born in Lucknow, then Leonard Eustace (1896–1974) and Cyril Gordon (1898–1977), who were both born in Plumstead. Lieutenant Cyril G. Luchford of the 14th (Service) Battalion (Pioneers), Northumberland Fusiliers, was awarded the Military Cross on 1 January 1919.

== Military service ==
When the war broke out in August 1914, Luchford was living with his family in Bromley, Kent, and working as a clerk in Martin's Bank, Lombard Street. He enlisted almost immediately in the Norfolk Regiment (later the Royal Norfolk Regiment), and was commissioned as a second lieutenant in the Army Service Corps on 26 September. He served in France attached to the Divisional Cavalry of the 7th (Meerut) Division from December 1914 to January 1917, receiving promotion to lieutenant on 1 August 1915. He then transferred to the Royal Flying Corps, and qualified as a pilot on 19 May 1917.

=== Flying service ===
From May 1917, Luchford served as a pilot with No. 20 Squadron, flying the F.E.2d. He scored his first win on 13 June, with James Tennant as his observer. On 29 June, in a mid-day clash with Jasta 8, Luchford set an Albatros D.III afire. He then scored steadily throughout July, totting up seven more wins over enemy fighters that month. Luchford scored twice more in August, then changed mounts to the two-seater Bristol F.2 Fighter. He was appointed a flight commander with the rank of captain on 11 September. Flying with a number of different observers such as Richard Hill, Victor White, and William Benger, Luchford was credited with 13 more triumphs between 9 September and 21 October 1917.

His first award of the Military Cross was gazetted on 27 October, and his second on 26 November. He was killed in action by Walter von Bülow-Bothkamp on 2 December 1917. Having no known grave he is commemorated at the Arras Flying Services Memorial, and also at the Private Banks Cricket and Athletic Club, Catford.

== Awards and citations ==
Military Cross
Temporary Lieutenant Harry George Ernest Luchford, General List and RFC.

"For conspicuous gallantry and devotion to duty. He has carried out a great deal of extremely useful work, and has proved himself a capable and determined leader. On one occasion when on a photographic reconnaissance he and his observer shot down and destroyed two enemy scouts. He has destroyed five other hostile machines."

Bar to Military Cross
Temporary Captain Harry George Ernest Luchford, MC, General List and RFC.

"For conspicuous gallantry and devotion to duty. When engaged on a patrol, he and his observer encountered about fifteen hostile aeroplanes, and shot one of them down in flames. Later, when engaged on a reconnaissance with three other machines, he encountered eight hostile, aeroplanes and shot one of them down. On another occasion he destroyed one of three hostile scouts which were attacking one of our machines, and also shot down a hostile two-seater."

== Bibliography ==
- Guttman, Jon & Dempsey, Harry (2009). Pusher Aces of World War I. Osprey Publishing. ISBN 978-1-84603-417-6.
