= List of mayors of Waco, Texas =

The Mayor of the City of Waco is the official head of the city of Waco in the U.S. state of Texas. Waco was incorporated in 1856.

Name	Portrait	Term start	Term end	Notes / citation
HANAN JONES		1856		
T. G. Jones				
W. D. Chambers				
R. N. Goode				
Ernest Albertis McKenney				
I. N. Mullins				
C. B. Way				
B. F. Harris				
Jacob Long				
John C. West				
Augustine J. Byrd		December 17, 1875	1878	Elected December 17, 1875. Succeeded by E. A. Sturgis; Former confederate soldier.
E. A. Sturgis		1878	1884	
W. H. Wilkes		1884	1886	
E. A. Sturgis (2nd term)		1886	1888	Source indicates that Sturgis was mayor in 1886 and was succeeded by A. Hinchman
Acanthus Hinchman		1890		Sources conflict as to when Hinchman's term began in 1888 or 1890
Champe Carter McCulloch		1895	1895	
W. H. Wilkes (2nd term)		1896	1896	
Champe Carter McCulloch (2nd term)		1897	1899	
J. W. Riggins		1900	1902	
Allen Sanford		1903	1903	
Jas. B. Baker		1904	1909	
H. B. Mistrot		1910	1911	
J.H. Mackey		1912	1913	
J. W. Riggins (2nd term)		1914	1915	
John Dollins		1916	1917	
Ed McCullough		1918	1919	
Ben C. Richards		1920	1923	
Thos P. Stone		1924	April 9, 1926	Resigned April 9, 1926
J. W. Holloway		April 9, 1926	April 15, 1926	
H. F. Connally		April 15, 1926		
A. Baker Duncan		1927		
T.D. Brooks		1928		
T.F. Bush		1930		
G.H. Zimmerman		1932		
Carl Mason		1934	November 11, 1934	Resigned
John F. Sheehy		November 11, 1934		
Jos W. Hale		1935		
Charles Gray Catto		1937		
Geo. O. Jones		1938		
T.M. Gribble		1939		
L.T. Murray		1940		
D. T. Hicks		1941		
Hubert Johnson		1942		
Berry Williams		1943		
A.N. Denton		1944		
Frank L. Wilcox		1945		
Richard C. Bush		1946		
J.E. Hawkins		1948		
L.M. Crow		1949		
L. H. Bradshaw		1952		
Ralph R.Wolf		1953		
H.F. Connally, Jr.		1954		
O.B. Robertson		1955		
D.T. Hicks, Jr.		1956		
Truett K. Smith		1957		
Joe L. Ward, Jr.		1958		
Madison Clement		1959		
Billy J. Hinton		1960		
Maurice C. Barnes		1961		
Stanton Brown, Jr.		1962		
W.B. Lenamon		1963		
Roger N. Conger		1964		
J. Ernest Pardo		1965		
P.M. Johnston		1966		
H. Malcolm Louden		1968		
Howard Dudgeon, Jr.		1969		
Travis Du Bois, Jr.		1970		
Karl M. May		1971		
Bill McDavid		April 11, 1972	November 15, 1972	
Harold Mathias		November 1972		
Oscar N. Du Conge		1974		First African-American mayor of Waco
L.Ted Getterman, Jr.		1975		
Milburn Smith		1976	September 21, 1976	
J. R. Closs		September 21, 1976		
J. Leigh Brooks		1977		
Lois Ted Getterman, Jr.		1978		
J.P. Davis		1979		
George Chase		April 5, 1980	October 14, 1980	
David S. Dow		October 14, 1980		
Billy H. Davis		1981		
Roland Arriola, Jim Mathis		1982		
Malcolm P. Duncan, Sr.		1984		
Ruben M. Santos		1985		
LaNelle McNamara		1986		
David Sibley		1987	1988	
R.D. Pattillo		1988		
Charles Reed		1990		
J. Robert Sheehy, Sr.		1992		
Michael D. Morrison		1996	2000	
Linda Ethridge		2000		
Mae Jackson†		May 2004	February 11, 2005	First elected African-American and first female African-American mayor of Waco. Died while in office on February 11, 2005; replaced by Mayor pro tem Robin G. McDurham.
Robin G. McDurham		February 21, 2005	May 17, 2005	Sworn in on February 21, 2005. Served as mayor after the death of mayor Mae Jackson until a special election on May 7, 2005.
Virginia DuPuy		May 17, 2005	May 18, 2010	Sworn in on May 17, 2005 after special election held on May 7, 2005. Won in general election for mayor on May 13, 2006 and sworn in on May 16, 2006. She went on to win reelection in 2007, 2008, and 2009.
Jim Bush		May 18, 2010	2012	
Malcolm P. Duncan Jr.		2012	2016	
Kyle Deaver		2016	2020	
Dillon Meek		2020	2024	Meek announced that he would not stand for reelection in May 2024.
Hanan Jones		2024	Incumbent	
