= Ray Parer =

Australian aviator

Ray Parer AFC
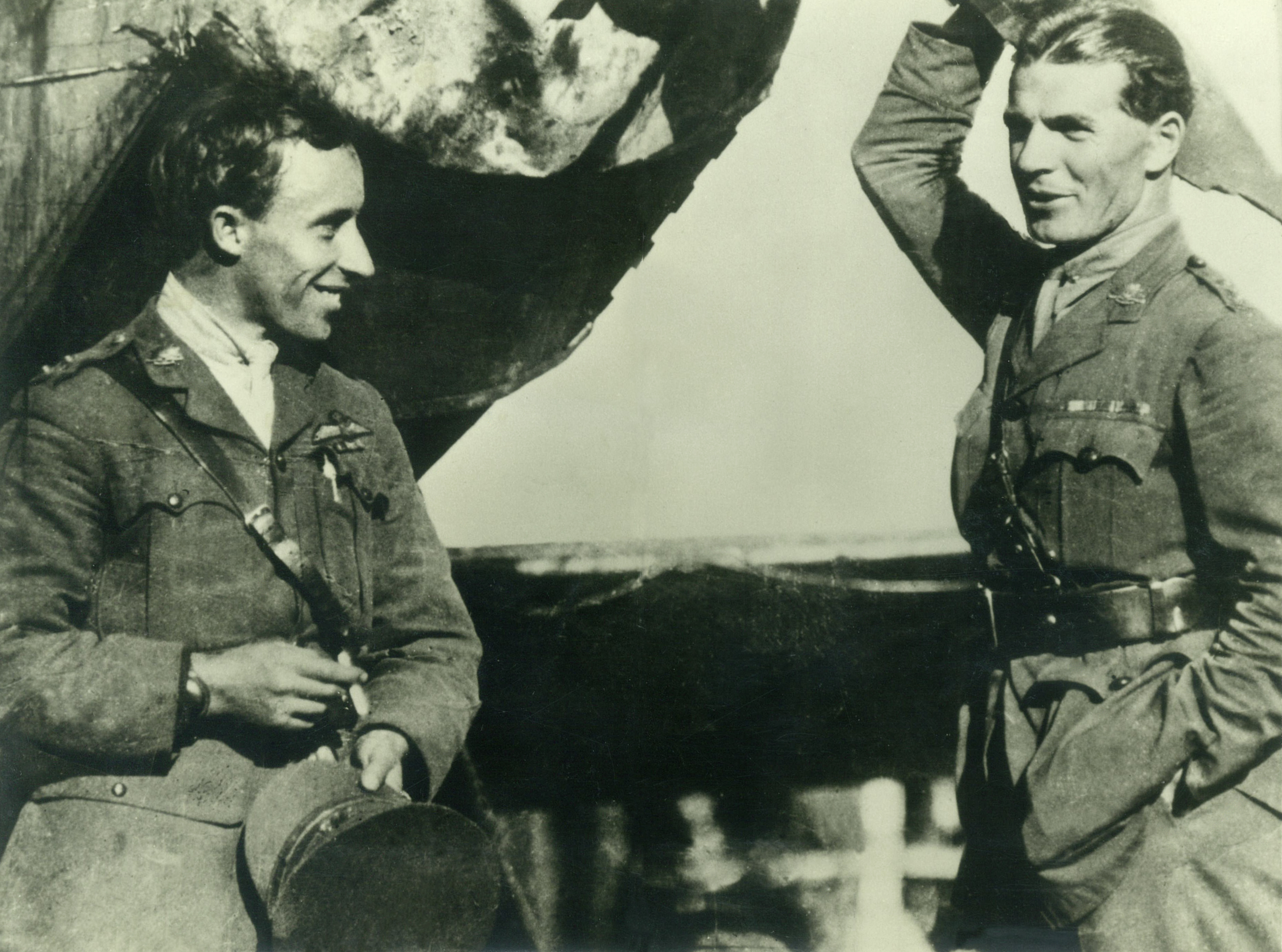
- Ray Parer & John McIntosh in front of their battered Airco de Havilland DH.9 on 31 August 1920 at Flemington Racecourse, Melbourne.
- Born: Raymond John Paul Parer; 18 February 1894; South Melbourne, Victoria, Australia
- Died: 4 July 1967 (aged 73)
- Occupation: Pilot

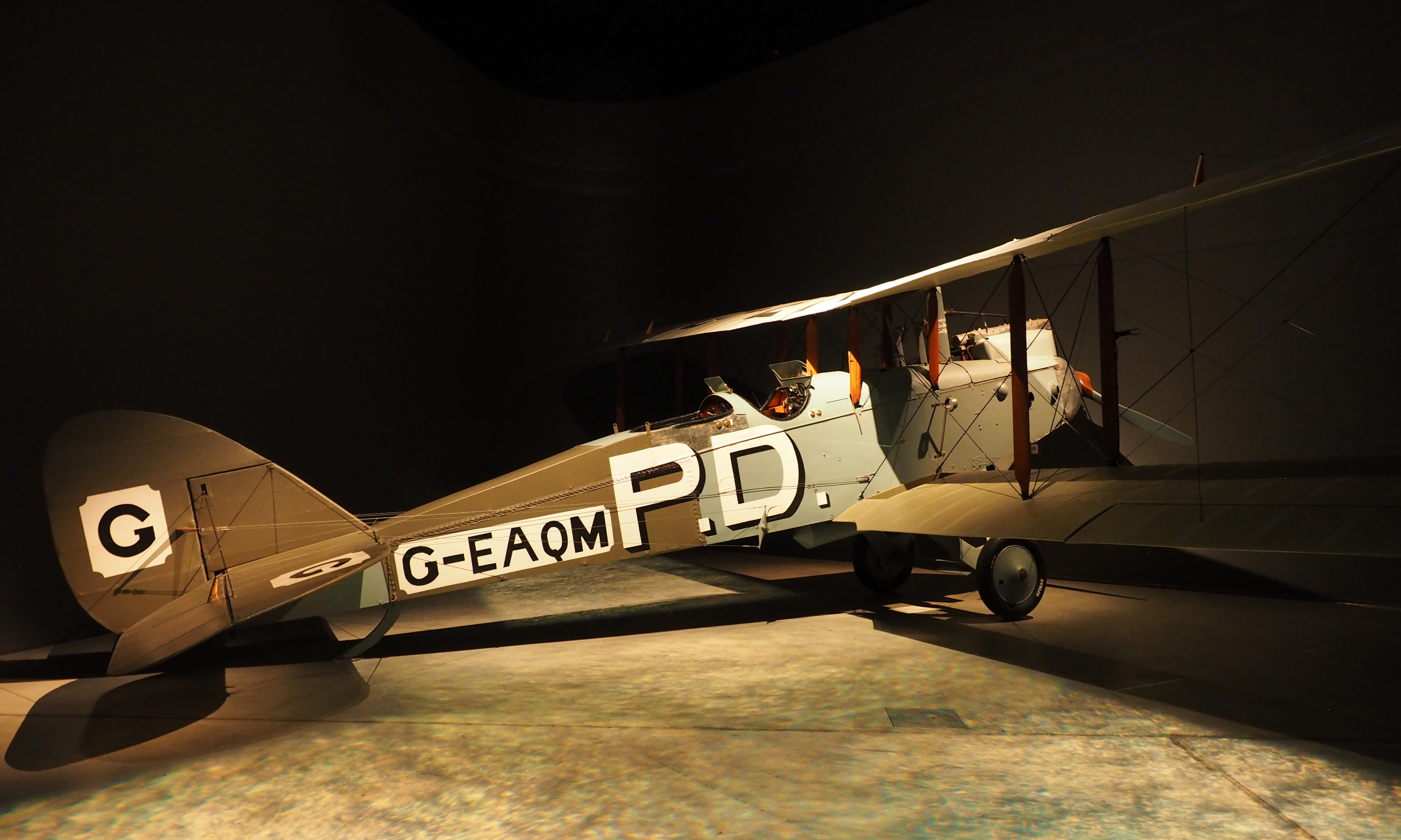
The Airco de Havilland DH.9 Parer and McIntosh flew from the UK to Australia on display at the Australian War Memorial in 2018

Raymond John Paul Parer AFC (18 February 1894 – 4 July 1967) was an Australian aviator.

Parer was born in South Melbourne, Victoria, the second of nine children of a Spanish-born caterer, Michael Parer, and his Australian wife Maria (née Carolin). He was educated initially by an educator on King Island, then at Mentone College, Melbourne, with his final two years from 1920 at St Stanislaus College, Bathurst, New South Wales, and Xavier College, Melbourne. He developed an interest in aviation and mechanics at an early age, and served a motor engineering apprenticeship with Broadbribb Brothers in Melbourne.

He enlisted in the Australian Flying Corps on 2 November 1916, initially as a mechanic, but was soon accepted to train as a pilot, as an acting sergeant. From February to May 1917, he trained on box kites at the Central Flying School at Point Cook. He was commissioned a second lieutenant on 1 June 1917 and was sent to England to complete his training, qualifying as a pilot and being promoted lieutenant on 15 February 1918. He served as a test and ferry pilot with the Royal Air Force Central Despatch Pool, being twice recommended for the Air Force Cross.

After the end of World War I, the Australian government offered a prize of £10,000 for the first flight from England to Australia. He paired with John McIntosh, and, although leaving well after the event had been won, they arrived in Darwin on 2 August 1920. Their aircraft was an Airco DH-9, and theirs was the only other entrant to successfully complete the race. It was the first single-engined aircraft to fly from England to Australia. On 31 August, at Flemington Racecourse, Melbourne, then the Australian capital, they handed a bottle of Peter Dawson whisky that had travelled with them from England to Australian prime minister Billy Hughes.

He and McIntosh were awarded the Air Force Cross for this feat on 23 November 1920, as well as £500 each. The journey was detailed in the book Flight and Adventures of Parer and McIntosh by Emily Charnwood.

Parer formed Parer's Commercial Aviation Service in Melbourne. On 27 December 1920, he won the first Victorian Aerial Derby in a DH-4, setting a record of 33 minutes 15 seconds over the 65-mile course which stood for a decade. His attempt at the first flight to encircle Australia, which he began from Melbourne on 21 October 1921 in an FE2b, ended in disaster when he crashed on take-off at Boulder, Western Australia on 7 February 1922. Disillusioned with aviation, he bought a garage on King Island in Bass Strait.

He later became a pioneer of aviation in New Guinea. Aviation in the country at that time was chiefly involved with the gold mining industry, which was thriving in the 1920s. In November 1926, Parer set up the Bulolo Goldfields Aeroplane Service Ltd there, and was the first pilot to fly over the Owen Stanley Range. He spent fifteen years flying in New Guinea.

In 1934, he participated in the MacRobertson Air Race from England to Australia, this time teamed with Geoff Hemsworth, flying a Fairey Fox. They departed on 20 October 1934, arriving at the destination, Melbourne, on 13 February 1935. Parer then returned to New Guinea. However the advent of World War II and the impending Japanese invasion of New Guinea in 1942 found him once again in military service, this time in the Royal Australian Air Force. Due to his health he was made a reservist, and since he could not fly he turned to the sea. He was an engineer aboard the Melanesia, which delivered supplies and undertook reconnaissance along New Guinea's northern coastline.

After the war he purchased a ketch in Darwin, and embarked in pearl exploration in the Torres Strait. From 1949 to 1951, he skippered a barge for the Department of Works around the Papua New Guinea coast. He then worked as an engineer on tourist vessels around the Great Barrier Reef in Queensland. From 1956 to 1958, he returned to Papua New Guinea to work on boats in the oil exploration industry. He spent the last years of his life running two small farms at Mount Nebo, Queensland.

Parer married divorcee Ethel Blanche Jones on 30 December 1941. They were divorced on 8 May 1950 and he remarried to Mary Patricia Ross, but that marriage also ended in divorce. He had one son.

On 21 October 2023, Parer and John Cowe McIntosh were inducted into the Australian Aviation Hall of Fame.
