= Victor White (RAF officer) =

English World War I flying ace

Victor Rodney Stokes White
- Born: 1895; Exeter, Devon, England
- Died: 1967 (aged 71–72); Cheltenham, Gloucestershire, England
- Military career
- Allegiance: United Kingdom
- Branch: British Army; Royal Air Force
- Service years: 1915–1919; 1938–1956
- Rank: Squadron Leader
- Units: South Staffordshire Regiment; No. 45 Squadron RFC; No. 20 Squadron RFC
- Conflicts: World War I • Western Front; World War II
- Awards: Military Cross & bar

Squadron Leader Victor Rodney Stokes White MC* (1895–1967) was an English World War I flying ace credited with six aerial victories. He returned to military service during World War II.

== Early life and background ==
White was born in Exeter, the son of John White, an Exeter politician and game dealer, and Mary Jane Sansom. In the 1911 Census for Exeter White is described as a 15-year-old Student for Bank.

== World War I ==
White was commissioned as a second lieutenant (on probation) in the 3rd (Reserve) Battalion, South Staffordshire Regiment, on 30 March 1915, and was confirmed in his rank on 2 November.

White served in the trenches of the Western Front, where he won the Military Cross, which was gazetted on 26 May 1917. His citation read:

Second Lieutenant Victor Rodney Stokes White, South Staffordshire Regiment, Special Reserve.

"For conspicuous gallantry and devotion to duty when acting as Forward Observation officer. He constantly moved about in the open under very heavy fire and obtained most valuable information."

However, by the time of his award White had been seconded to the Royal Flying Corps, having been appointed a flying officer (observer) on 28 April 1917. He was promoted to lieutenant in the South Staffordshires on 1 July 1917, while remaining seconded to the RFC.

Posted to No. 45 Squadron White gained his first aerial victory on 13 July, flying in a Sopwith 1½ Strutter with pilot Captain Geoffrey Cock, by driving down out of control an Albatros D.III fighter east of Polygon Wood.

On 1 August 1917 White was promoted to the temporary rank of lieutenant in the RFC. He was also transferred to No. 20 Squadron, to fly in Bristol F.2b fighters. On 25 September, with pilot Second Lieutenant N. V. Harrison, he shot down in flames an Albatros D.V fighter over Becelaere. White was then paired with pilot Captain Harry Luchford with whom, in the space of five days between 17 and 21 October, he destroyed four enemy aircraft; two D.V fighters, and DFW and LVG reconnaissance aircraft.

On 26 November 1917 White was awarded a bar to his Military Cross. His citation read:

Second Lieutenant (Temporary Lieutenant) Victor Rodney Stokes White, South Staffordshire Regiment, Special Reserve, and Royal Flying Corps.

"For conspicuous gallantry and devotion to duty. While acting as observer on an offensive patrol he and his pilot shot down an enemy scout in flames. Later, while on a reconnaissance with three other machines, he and his pilot engaged eight enemy aeroplanes and shot down and destroyed one of them. On another occasion they destroyed one of three hostile scouts and also a hostile two-seater machine."

White then returned to England to train as a pilot, being appointed a flying officer on 18 March 1918, with seniority from 28 April 1917.

On 1 August 1919 White was granted a permanent commission as a lieutenant (later flying officer) in the RAF, but on 13 December 1922 was placed on the retired list on account of his ill-health contracted on active service.

=== List of aerial victories ===
Combat record
No.	Date/Time	Aircraft/ Serial No.	Opponent	Result	Location	Notes
No. 45 Squadron RFC
1	13 July 1917 @ 1715	Sopwith 1½ Strutter (A1016)	Albatros D.III	Out of control	East of Polygon Wood	Pilot: Captain Geoffrey Cock
No. 20 Squadron RFC
2	25 September 1917 @ 1830	Bristol F.2b (B1126)	Albatros D.V	Destroyed in flames	Becelaère	Pilot: Second Lieutenant N. V. Harrison
3	17 October 1917 @ 1000	Bristol F.2b (B1138)	Albatros D.V	Destroyed	Dadizeele	Pilot: Captain Harry Luchford
4	18 October 1917 @ 0845–0900	Bristol F.2b (B1138)	Albatros D.V	Destroyed	Houthem–Tenbrielen	Pilot: Captain Harry Luchford
5	18 October 1917 @ 0845–0900	Bristol F.2b (B1138)	DFW C	Destroyed	Dadizeele	Pilot: Captain Harry Luchford
6	21 October 1917 @ 1530	Bristol F.2b (B1138)	LVG C	Destroyed	Menin	Pilot: Captain Harry Luchford

== World War II ==
On 14 February 1938, as the threat of war once again loomed over Europe, White was commissioned into the Reserve of Air Force Officers (RAFO), with the rank of flight lieutenant (Class "C"), and was transferred to Class "CC" on 7 May. On 21 July 1939 White was promoted to squadron leader, but on 1 September, just days prior to the declaration of war with Germany, he was commissioned into the Administrative and Special Duties Branch of the Royal Air Force Volunteer Reserve (RAFVR).

On 20 August 1945, as the war drew to an end, White was commissioned into the Royal Air Force Reserve of Officers (RAFRO). However, he appears to have retained his commission in the RAFVR, as he eventually relinquished it on 10 February 1954, retaining his rank of squadron leader, and did not relinquish his commission in the RAFRO "on cessation of duty" until 2 February 1956.
