= Alfred Haynes =

Alfred Haynes can refer to:

- Al Haynes (1931–2019), American airline pilot known for his crash-landing of United Airlines Flight 232
- Alf Haynes (1907–1953), English football player

== See also ==
- Alfred Haines (disambiguation)
