= Virginia DuPuy =

American mayor

Mayor of Waco, Texas
- In office May 17, 2005 – May 18, 2010
- Preceded by: Robin G. McDurham
- Succeeded by: Jim Bush

Personal details
- Spouse(s): Leslie Carr DuPuy, Jr.
- Profession: President and CEO of DuPuy Oxygen

Virginia DuPuy is an American politician and public servant who served as the mayor of Waco, Texas from 2005 to 2010.

== Biography ==
DuPuy received her Bachelor of Arts in drama in 1956 from Baylor University and her Master of Arts degree in 1961 also from Baylor University. After graduation, she worked as elementary school art teacher and organized various theatre productions in the area until 1984 where she took over her husband's oxygen and supply company, DuPuy Oxygen.

DuPuy served as chairwoman of the Waco Chamber of Commerce and headed the Water Quality Taskforce before where she presided over the development of a plan to reuse waste water from the cities of Waco, Bellmead, Hewitt, Lacy-Lakeview, Woodway, and Robinson as well as the environmental protection of the North Bosque River watershed and the raising of Lake Waco to ensure adequate water supply for the next 60 years.

She first ran for the city council in 2004 after Randy Riggs vacated his seat to run for mayor.

Dupuy was reelected mayor in a landslide election in May 2008 in which she received over six times as many votes as the challenger. After re-election, DuPuy expressed her plans for the upcoming years as mayor to the Waco Tribune-Herald:

“I’m looking forward to another two years and being a part of what’s going on in Waco. I plan on seeing continued development in downtown Waco and along the Brazos River Corridor. I’m looking forward to the overall development plans from the dam back up to the mammoth site. We hope to get started on that this year.”

She said she sees opportunities for the city to work with local colleges and hospitals to help develop a biotechnology industry in Waco.

== Personal life ==
In 1959, she married Leslie Carr DuPuy, Jr.; they have two sons. She attends Central Presbyterian Church.
