= Earl Hand =

Canadian flying ace (1897–1954)

Earl McNabb Hand
- Born: 10 March 1897; Sault Ste. Marie, Ontario, Canada
- Died: 19 March 1954 (aged 57); Toronto, Ontario, Canada
- Military career
- Allegiance: George V of the British Empire
- Branch: Flying service
- Rank: Captain
- Nickname: Handie
- Units: No. 71 Squadron RFC, No. 73 Squadron RFC, No. 45 Squadron RAF,
- Awards: Distinguished Flying Cross, French Croix de Guerre

Captain Earl McNabb Hand DFC (10 March 1897 – 19 March 1954) was a Canadian World War I flying ace credited with five confirmed aerial victories and two unconfirmed ones.

== Biography ==
=== Early life ===
Hand was born in Saint Ste. Marie, the son of Thomas A. Hand and Hannah Jane Hand.

=== Military service ===
Hand joined the Canadian Expeditionary Force on April 7, 1916. Soon, he was sent to France's Western Front.

Hand began his victory roll while flying a Sopwith Camel for 45 Squadron. He tallied his first win when he drove an Albatros D.V down out of control at Langemark-Poelkapelle, Belgium on 15 November 1917. After 45 Squadron shifted from the Western Front to Italy, Hand had a couple of unconfirmed claims on 11 January 1918; he then scored four times between 30 January and 9 May 1918. A summary of his victories shows four destroyed enemy airplanes, one confirmed and two unconfirmed driven down out of control. On 1 June 1918, Hand was shot down by Austro-Hungarian ace Frank Linke-Crawford. Linke-Crawford hit the gas tank of Hand's Camel and set it afire; somehow, Hand survived both the flames and the impact of the crash. However, he was badly burned and taken prisoner.

=== Later life ===
Hand was repatriated in 1919 and returned to Canada. He became a magistrate. He also helped found the Toronto Flying Club.
