= Ernest Masters =

British WWI flying ace

Ernest Harold Masters
- Born: 1899; Oldbury, Worcestershire, England
- Died: 24 December 1918 (aged 18–19); France
- Burial place: Duisans British Cemetery, Étrun, Pas-de-Calais, France; 50°18′58″N 2°40′22″E
- Military career
- Allegiance: United Kingdom
- Branch: British Army; Royal Air Force
- Service years: 1917–1918
- Rank: Lieutenant
- Unit: No. 45 Squadron RAF
- Conflicts: World War I; Italian Front; Western Front
- Awards: Croix de Guerre (France)

Lieutenant Ernest Harold Masters was a British First World War flying ace credited with eight aerial victories.

== Military service ==
Masters was born in Oldbury, Worcestershire, the son of George and Fanny Masters. He joined the Royal Flying Corps as a cadet, and was commissioned as a temporary second lieutenant (on probation) on the General List on 26 September 1917. He was appointed a flying officer on 29 December 1917.

Masters was posted to No. 45 Squadron RFC, based in northern Italy, in early 1918, flying the Sopwith Camel. His first victories came early on the morning of 13 May 1918 when he and Lieutenant Francis Stephen Bowles shared in the destruction an Albatros D.III over Costa, and then Masters destroyed a LVG C by himself over Frison shortly afterwards. Masters gained another double victory on 19 June, destroying and driving down two Albatros D.Vs over Monte Meatta—Asiago. On 14 July he destroyed a Type D over Monte Cismon, on 10 August a LVG C over Foclatti, and on 20 August another Type C south of Asiago. In September 1918 his squadron was moved to France, where on 23 October 1918 Masters drove down a Rumpler C over Coincourt.

On 2 November 1918 he was awarded the Croix de Guerre avec Palme by France.

Masters was killed in a flying accident on 24 December 1918, and is buried in the Duisans British Cemetery at Étrun.
