= Alfred Haines (RAF officer) =

- Born: Alfred John Haines; Early 1898; Evesham, Worcestershire, England
- Died: 10 August 1918 (aged 20); Vicinity of Asiago, Italy
- Burial place: Montecchio Precalcino Communal Cemetery Extension, Montecchio Precalcino, Italy; 45.6665°N 11.5578°E
- Military career
- Allegiance: United Kingdom
- Branch: British Army; Royal Air Force
- Service years: 1917–1918
- Rank: Lieutenant
- Unit: No. 45 Squadron RFC/RAF
- Conflicts: World War I • Italian front
- Awards: Distinguished Flying Cross

Lieutenant Alfred John Haines DFC (1898 – 10 August 1918) was a British World War I flying ace credited with six aerial victories.

== Military service ==
Haines joined the Royal Flying Corps as a cadet, was appointed a temporary second lieutenant (on probation) on 14 July 1917, and confirmed in his rank on 26 September.

He was assigned to No. 45 Squadron in Italy, flying the Sopwith Camel. He gained his first victory on 4 February 1918, destroying an Albatros D.V over Susegana. His next did not come until 7 June, when he set two Albatros D.IIIs afire over Arsiera. He then destroyed an Aviatik over Grigno on 23 July; and finally, on the 29th, destroyed two Austro-Hungarian Phönix D.Is over Prata di Pordenone. On 10 August 1918, he was flying at 10,000 feet and took a direct hit from anti-aircraft cannon. His body fell into "no man's land". The Austro-Hungarians returned his body under flag of truce.

He is buried in Montecchio Precalcino Communal Cemetery Extension, Montecchio Precalcino.

Haines was awarded the Distinguished Flying Cross, which was gazetted posthumously on 21 September 1918. His citation read:

Lieutenant Alfred John Haines.

During the past three months this very gallant pilot has destroyed five enemy machines, and earlier in the year he crashed another. He was killed in action on 10 August 1918.
