= Mae Jackson (politician) =

American social worker and local politician

Mayor of Waco, Texas
- In office May 2004 – February 11, 2005
- Preceded by: Linda Ethridge
- Succeeded by: Robin G. McDurham

Personal details
- Born: 1941
- Died: 2005

Mae Jackson, born Mae Allison (1941-2005) was an American social worker and local politician. In May 2004, she became the first elected black mayor of Waco, Texas.

== Life ==
Mae Allison was born in Teague, Texas on September 10, 1941, the son of a school principal and a teacher. She was educated at Booker T. Washington High School and Texas Southern University, graduating with a B.Sc. in 1962. After brief jobs at Riverside National Bank and a social work position at John Sealy Hospital in Galveston, she took up graduate study, gaining a master's degree in social work from Our Lady of the Lake University in 1965.

In 1969 she joined the National Council of Negro Women, working with the NCNW in Mississippi until 1971. She also worked as an administrator at the Harlem YWCA in New York City. After two years, she returned to Texas, becoming a caseworker, social work teacher and community volunteer in Waco. She also returned to study, gaining a PhD from the University of Texas at Arlington in 1985, with a thesis on volunteering.

She married Howard Andrew Jackson, with whom she brought up a stepdaughter, foster son, adopted daughter, and biological daughter.

Jackson became increasingly active in Democratic Party politics. From 1985 to 1987 she served as vice chair of Texas Governor Mark White's Commission for Women. From 1991 to 1997 Governor Ann Richards appointed her to serve as an executive member of the Texas Board of Pardons and Paroles.

Jackson served on the Waco City Council for District I from 2000 to 2004. She was elected Mayor of Waco in May 2004. However, she died suddenly on February 11, 2005, cutting short her office.

In 2018 Jackson's daughter, Andrea Jackson Barefield, was elected to Waco City Council, representing District I.
