= Charles Gray Catto =

American World War I flying ace

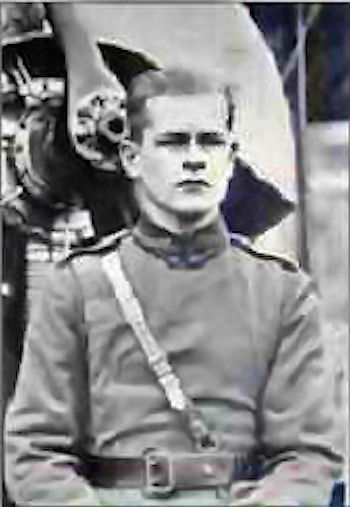
- Charles Gray Catto, 1918
- Born: November 7, 1896; Dallas, Texas
- Died: June 24, 1972 (aged 75); Waco, Texas
- Burial place: Oakwood Cemetery, Waco, Texas
- Military career
- Allegiance: United States
- Branch: Royal Air Force (United Kingdom)
- Unit: Royal Air Force: No. 45 Squadron RAF
- Conflicts: World War I

Charles Gray Catto (7 November 1896 – 24 June 1972) was an American pursuit pilot and a flying ace in World War I.

He died in Waco, Texas, on 24 June 1972.

== Biography ==
A son of British immigrants, Catto was born in Dallas, Texas, in November 1896. Prior to World War I, he attended the University of Edinburgh, Scotland as a medical student. He wanted to enlist after the war broke out, but his parents refused. They told him he could only continue his studies if he promised not to join the army. He agreed to this and later, in June 1917, joined the Royal Flying Corps instead. He completed his flight training in England and left for Italy to join 45 Squadron, flying Sopwith Camels. He claimed six enemy aircraft, one of which fell inside Allied lines, piloted by Flieger Alois Gnamusch and Leutnant Rudolph Hess. He served with 45 Squadron when it was transferred to the Western Front in late 1918. He was credited with eight aerial victories.

After the war, Catto continued his medical studies at the University of Edinburgh and graduated in 1922. He returned to the United States and served his medical internship in New Orleans. In 1925, he became a doctor in his native Texas. He later entered politics and was elected mayor of Waco, Texas, on 20 April 1937.

== See also ==
- List of World War I flying aces from the United States
