= No. 45 Squadron RAF =

Flying squadron of the Royal Air Force

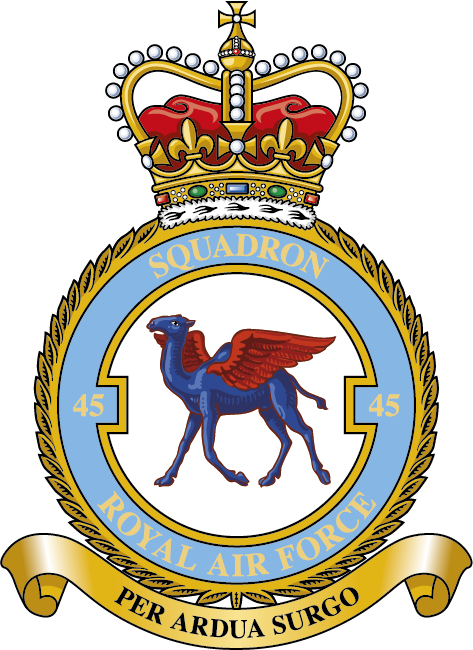
- Squadron badge
- Active: 1916–1918 (RFC); 1918–1919; 1921–1927; 1927–1970; 1972–1976; 1984–1992; 1992 – present
- Country: United Kingdom
- Branch: Royal Air Force
- Type: Flying squadron
- Role: Multi-engine pilot and rear crew training
- Part of: No. 22 Group; No. 3 Flying Training School
- Station: RAF Cranwell
- Nickname: 'Flying Camels'
- Mottos: Per ardua surgo (Latin for 'Through difficulties I arise')
- Aircraft: Embraer Phenom T1

Insignia
- Roundel

Number 45 Squadron is a flying squadron of the Royal Air Force which was established on 1 March 1916 as part of the Royal Flying Corps. The Squadron currently provides advanced flying training for all of the RAF's Multi-Engine Pilots using the Embraer Phenom T1, and also provides basic and advanced training for all RAF Mission Aircrew and Airborne Specialists (aircrew WSO and WSOPs) using a large array of air and ground-based training devices. The Squadron operates under the command of No. 3 Flying Training School at RAF Cranwell, Lincolnshire.

== History ==
=== First World War ===
Formed during World War I at Fort Grange, Gosport on 1 March 1916 as Number 45 Squadron, the unit was first equipped with Sopwith 1½ Strutters which it was to fly in the Scout role. Deployed to France in October of that year, the Squadron suffered heavy losses due to the quality of its aircraft, continuing until it transitioned to the Sopwith Camel in July 1917. Transferred to the Austro-Italian front at the end of 1917, 45 Squadron there engaged in ground attack and offensive patrols until September 1918 when it returned to France and joined the Independent Force.

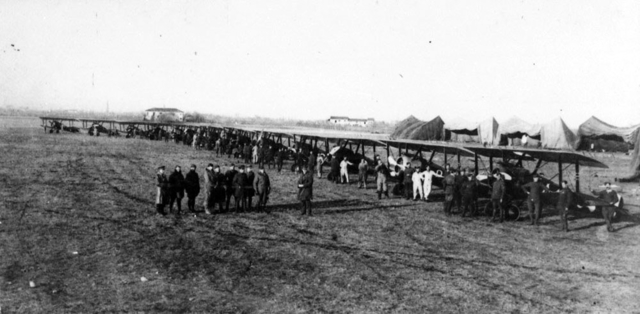
A group of Sopwith Camel aircraft of No. 45 Squadron, Royal Flying Corps, deployed at Istrana Airfield in December 1917

During the course of the war, some thirty flying aces served in the squadron's ranks. They included future Air Vice-Marshal Matthew Frew, Cedric Howell, Geoffrey Hornblower Cock, future Air Commodore Raymond Brownell, John C. B. Firth, Kenneth Barbour Montgomery, Mansell Richard James, Norman Macmillan, Peter Carpenter, Richard Jeffries Dawes, Norman Cyril Jones, Ernest Masters, Henry Moody, Thomas F. Williams, William Wright, James Dewhirst, James Belgrave, Edward Clarke, Alfred Haines, Thomas M. Harries, Alan Rice-Oxley, Earl Hand, Arthur Harris, Charles Gray Catto, John Pinder, and future Group Captain Sidney Cottle.

=== Inter-war period ===
The squadron returned to England in February 1919 and disbanded in December 1919. In April 1921 it reformed at RAF Helwan, Egypt. Assigned Vickers Vernon bomber-transports, the unit provided troop transportation and ground support and mail services throughout the Middle East, notably in support of anti-rebel operations in Iraq and Palestine. The unit transitioned to DH9As in 1927, to Fairey IIIs in 1929 and to Fairey Gordons in 1935. At some point the unit adopted the nickname "The Flying Camels". The Squadron Badge is a winged camel, approved by King Edward VIII in October 1936. The badge and nickname derive from the Sopwith used by the unit in World War I and its long service in the Middle East.

Between 16 May 1922 and 17 January 1927, No. 45 Squadron was equipped with the Vickers Vernon and based at RAF Hinaidi in the southern suburbs of Baghdad. RAF Hinaidi had been the centre of operations for all British forces in Iraq since April 1921. During the time that No. 45 Squadron was based at RAF Hinaidi, nine members of the squadron lost their lives in the service of their country and were buried at the Hinaidi RAF Peace Cemetery (later renamed Ma'Asker Al Raschid RAF Cemetery) which was located on the southern perimeter of the RAF Hinaidi cantonment. With the cemetery neglected for decades by the Commonwealth War Graves Commission, none of the No. 45 Squadron headstones has survived out of the total of 300 burials at Ma’Asker. The last two men killed from No. 45 Squadron were in a Vickers Vernon ambulance when it crashed taking off from RAF Hinaidi.

=== Second World War ===
At the start of World War II, 45 Squadron converted to Bristol Blenheims. From mid-1940 it took part in the North African Campaign and on 11 June was one of three squadrons that participated in the Allies' first attack on the Regia Aeronautica (Italian air force) base at El Adem: 18 Italian aircraft were destroyed or damaged on the ground, for the loss of three British aircraft. The following day, the squadron participated in an attack on shipping at Tobruk, damaging the Italian cruiser San Giorgio.

During late 1940 the squadron supported Allied ground forces in the East African Campaign, while based at Gura, in Eritrea. During its time at Gura, the squadron suffered losses – on 2 October two Blenheims were shot down by an Italian ace, sergeant-major Luigi "Gino" Baron; among the aircrew killed was 45 Squadron's CO, Sqn. Ldr. John Dallamore. His successor was acting Sqn Ldr Patrick Troughton-Smith.

Between June and August 1941, the squadron was based at RAF Aqir in Palestine, from where it was involved in operations against Vichy French forces in Lebanon. During an attack on Beirut on 10 July, three of the squadron's Blenheims were shot down by Vichy French D-520 fighters. While the crew of one Blenheim attempted to bail out, only the pilot, Sgt. Wilton-Jones, survived; he was captured, badly burned and hospitalised in Tripoli, Lebanon. Despite the heavy losses, the mission was regarded as a success. A ceasefire was declared at one minute past midnight on 12 July and the Allies assumed control of the hospital on 16 July.

From mid-1942 the unit was deployed to Burma and India, for service against the Japanese. Three aircraft from the Squadron participated in the first Allied bombing raid against Bangkok.

=== Malayan Emergency ===
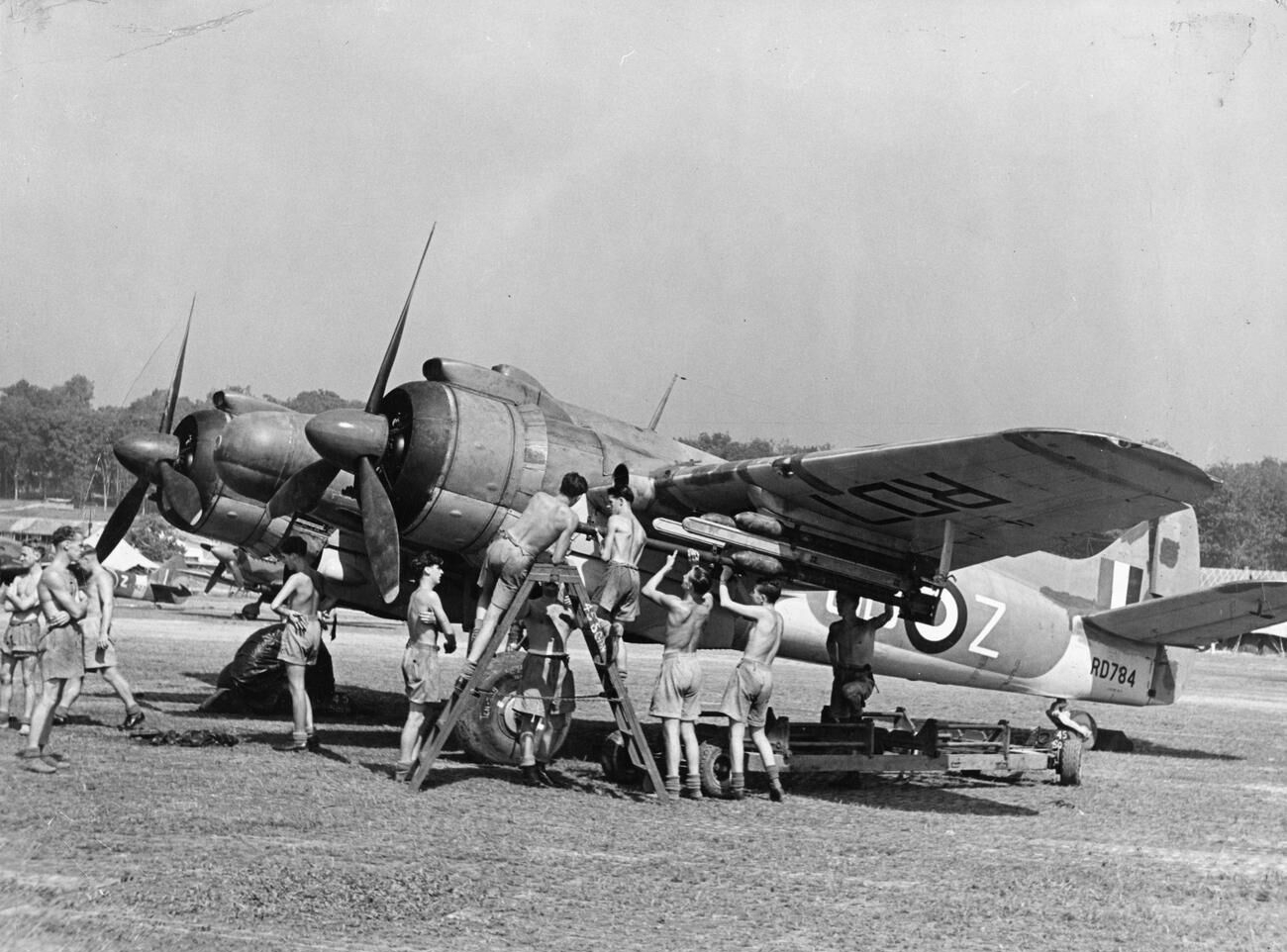
A No. 45 Squadron Briston Beaufighter is loaded with rockets for use against communist forces in Malaysia in 1950

After the Second World War, No. 45 Squadron served in the Malayan Emergency, based at RAF Station Tengah on the island of Singapore. There the unit engaged in ground attacks against pro-independence guerrillas belonging to the Malayan National Liberation Army, the armed wing of the Malayan Communist Party. Operation Firedog lasted for 12 years until the conclusion of the war. The unit also engaged in operations to quell unrest on the Sarawak coast in British North Borneo during this time. While operating in Malaya the unit flew Bristol Beaufighters. From 1955 the squadron was based at RAF Butterworth in Malaya, flying de Havilland Venoms under the command of Squadron Leader Geoffrey Cooper.

=== 1960s to 1980s ===
After re-equipping with English Electric Canberra B.15s in 1962, the squadron became involved in the Brunei Revolution and the subsequent confrontation with Indonesia until its resolution in 1966. The squadron disbanded on 13 January 1970 after the UK's withdrawal from East of Suez.

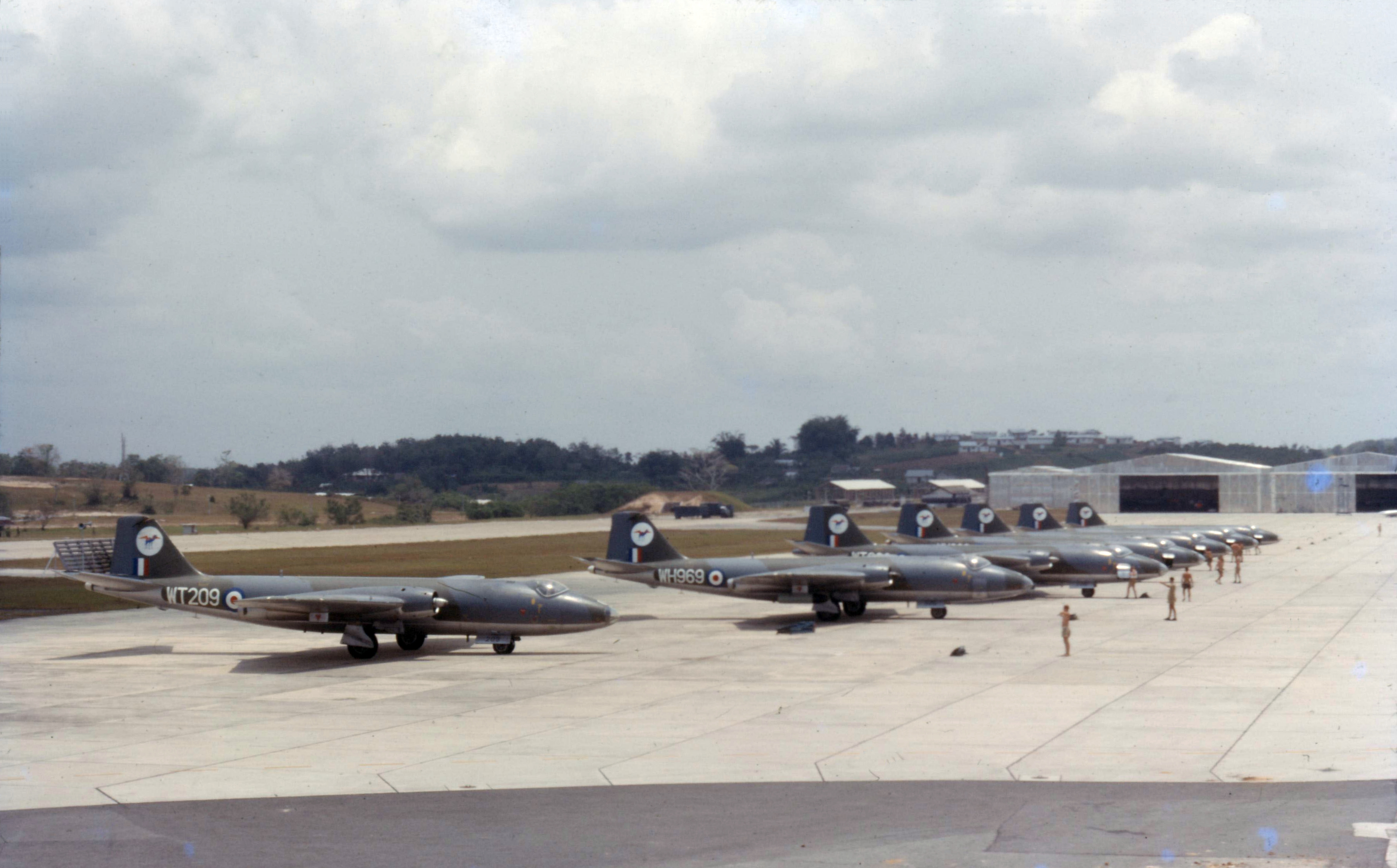
Several English Electric Canberra B.15 operated by No. 4 Squadron at RAF Tengah, Singapore in 1963

On 1 August 1972, the squadron was reformed at RAF West Raynham, Norfolk, equipped with Hawker Hunter FGA.9s, as a ground-attack training unit. The squadron disbanded in July 1976 at RAF Wittering after this role was taken over by the Tactical Weapons Unit.

In January 1984, the squadron number, as No. 45 (Reserve) Squadron, was assigned to the Tornado Weapons Conversion Unit (TWCU) at RAF Honington, Suffolk. As a 'Shadow Squadron' or war reserve, the squadron's war role was as a fully operational unit composed mainly of instructors, and assigned strike and other duties by SACEUR in support of land forces on the Continent resisting a Soviet assault on Western Europe. It would strike at targets assigned by SACEUR beyond the forward edge of the battlefield, deep within enemy-held areas, first with conventional weapons and later with tactical nuclear weapons if a conflict escalated to that level. The squadron's 26 Tornado aircraft were allocated 39 WE.177 nuclear bombs.

On 1 April 1992, the unit was disbanded and the TWCU title dropped, its aircraft and personnel becoming No. 15 (Reserve) Squadron whilst maintaining the same training role.

=== 1992 onwards ===
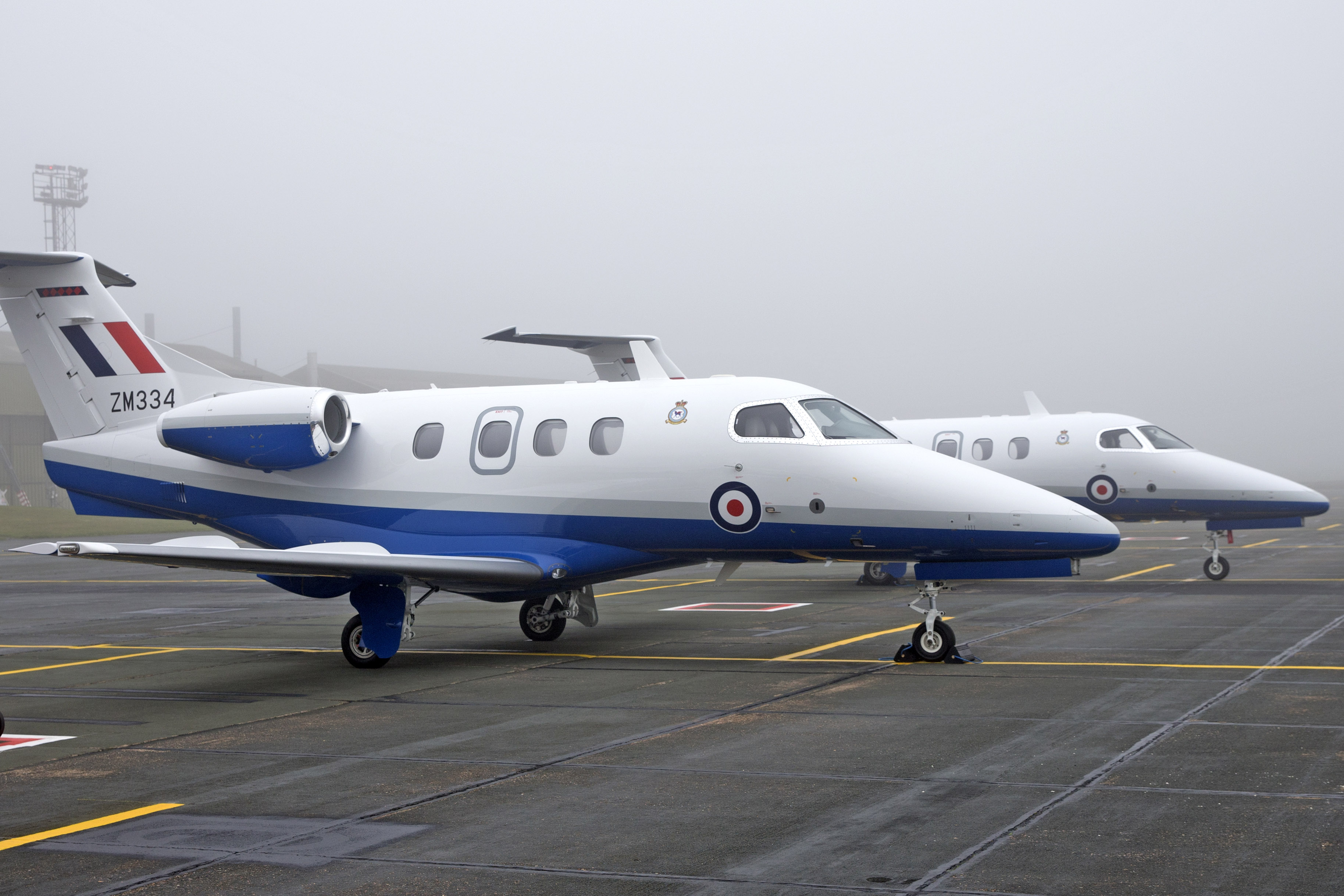
Two Embraer Phenom T1 of No. 45 Squadron at RAF Cranwell in April 2018

On 1 July 1992, the No. 45(R) Squadron identity was resurrected and adopted by the Multi-Engined Training Squadron (METS) at No. 6 FTS, RAF Finningley. The new No. 45(R) Squadron moved to RAF Cranwell, Lincolnshire, in October 1995, and in 2003, replaced its BAe Jetstream T1 with the Beechcraft B200 King Air serviced by Serco. In 2018, the squadron converted to the Embraer Phenom T1.

== Heritage ==
The squadron's badge features a winged camel, commemorating the Sopwith Camel used by the squadron for a large part of the First World War, and the squadron's long association with the Middle East. It was approved by King Edward VIII in October 1936.

The squadron's motto is Per ardua surgo (Latin for 'Through difficulties I arise').

== Battle honours ==
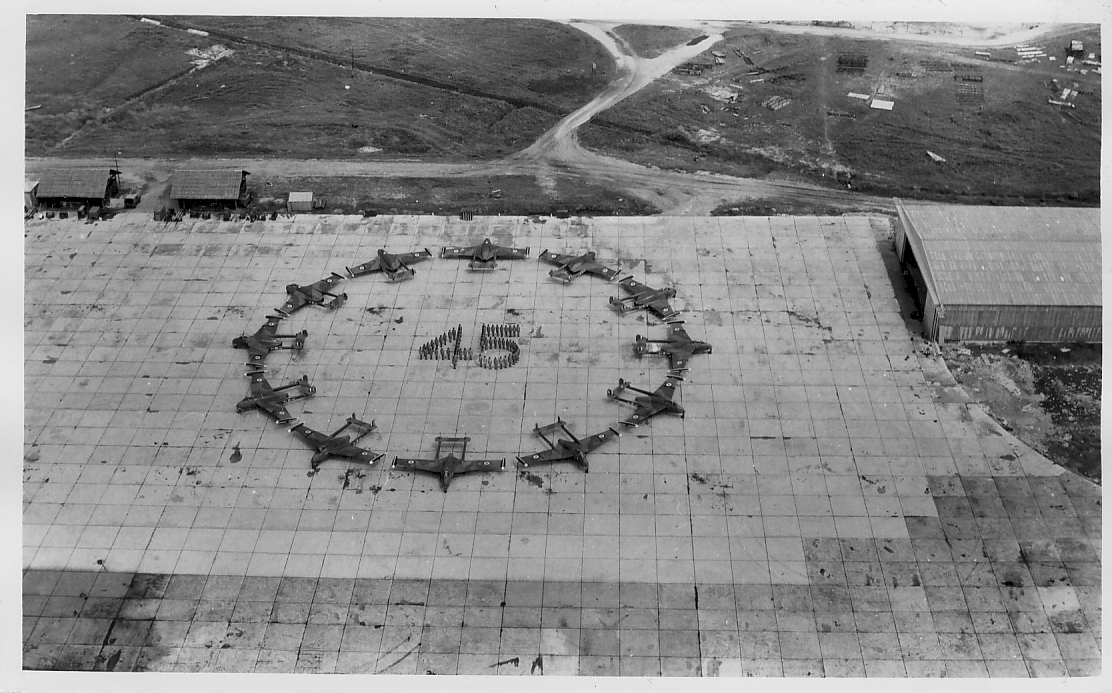
No. 45 Squadron de Havilland Venoms at RAF Butterworth, Malaya, in the mid-1950s

No. 45 Squadron has received the following battle honours. Those marked with an asterisk (*) may be emblazoned on the squadron standard.

- Western Front (1916–1917)*
- Somme (1916)
- Ypres (1917)
- Italian Front and Adriatic (1917–1918)
- Piave (1917–1918)
- Independent Force and Germany (1918)*
- Kurdistan (1922–1924)
- Iraq (1923–1925)
- Egypt and Libya (1940–1942)*
- East Africa (1940)*
- Syria (1941)
- Burma (1942)*
- Arakan (1943–1944)*
- Burma (1944–1945)*

== See also ==
- List of Royal Air Force aircraft squadrons
