= Matthew Frew =

Scottish First World War flying ace (1895–1974)

Sir Matthew Frew
- Born: 7 April 1895; Glasgow, Scotland
- Died: 28 May 1974 (aged 79); Pretoria, South Africa
- Military career
- Allegiance: United Kingdom
- Branch: British Army (1914–18); Royal Air Force (1918–48)
- Service years: 1914–1948
- Rank: Air Vice Marshal
- Nickname: "Bunty"
- Units: Highland Light Infantry; No. 45 Squadron RFC; No. 6 Squadron RAF
- Commands: Directorate of Air Training, South African Air Force (1942–48); Training HQ, South African Air Force (1940–42); RAF Hornchurch (1937–38); No. 10 Squadron RAF (1934–37); No. 111 Squadron RAF (1933–34)
- Conflicts: First World War; Second World War
- Awards: Knight Commander of the Order of the British Empire; Companion of the Order of the Bath; Distinguished Service Order & Bar; Military Cross & Bar; Air Force Cross; Mentioned in Despatches (2); Silver Medal of Military Valour (Italy); Commander of the Royal Order of George I (Greece); Military Cross, 1st class (Belgium)

Air Vice Marshal Sir Matthew Brown Frew, KBE, CB, DSO & Bar, MC & Bar, AFC (7 April 1895 – 28 May 1974) was a Scottish First World War flying ace, credited with 23 aerial victories, who went on to serve as a senior officer in the Royal Air Force and South African Air Force during the Second World War.

== Early life and background ==
Frew was born in Glasgow, Scotland, the son of Henry Lorimer Frew and his wife Annie. His father was a partner in the family business of George Frew & Son, sailmakers and cover makers of Paterson Street, Glasgow.

== First World War ==
Frew enlisted as a private in the Highland Light Infantry in 1914, and after serving on the front lines in France, transferred to the Royal Flying Corps in August 1916. After serving as a cadet, he was commissioned as a probationary temporary second lieutenant on 26 September, was appointed a flying officer on 6 April 1917, and confirmed in his rank on 11 April.

On 28 April 1917 Frew was posted to No. 45 Squadron RFC to serve on the Western Front in France, flying the Sopwith 1½ Strutter. He gained his first two victories on 5 June, flying with observer Second Lieutenant M. J. Dalton, then gained three more between 16 July and 10 August with observer Second Lieutenant George Brooke, all over Albatros D.IIIs, to attain flying ace status. No. 45 Squadron was then re-equipped with the Sopwith Camel, and Frew gained his 6th victory on 3 September, two more followed the next day, then another ten by 27 October. On 18 October he was awarded the Military Cross, and on 24 October, though still only a second lieutenant, was appointed a flight commander with the temporary rank of captain. On 17 December he was awarded a Bar to his Military Cross. No. 45 Squadron was then transferred to the Italian Front, and Frew gained another seven victories between 11 January and 4 February, bringing his confirmed total to 23.

After his aircraft was hit by anti-aircraft fire on 15 January 1918, Frew suffered from neck pains and was eventually invalided back to England the following month, to serve as a flying instructor at the Central Flying School for the rest of the war. On 4 March he was awarded the Distinguished Service Order, and was promoted to lieutenant on 26 March.

On 1 April 1918, the day that the Royal Flying Corps and Royal Naval Air Service were merged to form the Royal Air Force, Frew was again appointed a temporary captain. He received mentions in dispatches on 18 April and 30 May, and on 12 September was granted permission to wear the Silver Medal for Military Valour awarded to him by the King of Italy. On 5 May 1919 Frew was transferred to the unemployed list, and his award of the Air Force Cross was gazetted shortly after on 30 May.

== Inter-war career ==
On 24 October 1919 Frew rejoined the RAF on a short service commission with the rank of flight lieutenant. From 19 February 1920 he served on the Air Staff at the headquarters of No. 7 Group RAF, then on 8 June was posted to the RAF (Cadet) College at RAF Cranwell to serve on the staff and as an instructor. On 28 July 1921 Frew was granted a permanent commission in the RAF, retaining his rank and seniority, and his short service commission was cancelled.

On 8 December 1921 he was posted to No. 6 Squadron RAF in the Middle East Area, then to No. 4 Flying Training School in Egypt on 14 October 1923 to serve as a flying instructor. On 16 December 1925 Frew returned to the Home Establishment, to serve on the staff of the Armament and Gunnery School at RAF Eastchurch, where on 1 July 1927 he was promoted to squadron leader. On 24 July 1927 he was appointed Chief Flying Instructor at No. 1 Flying Training School, RAF Netheravon.

Frew returned to the Middle East when on 10 March 1931 he was appointed to serve on the Air Staff (Operations) at the Headquarters of RAF Iraq Command based at RAF Hinaidi. On 11 May 1933 he was appointed Officer Commanding, No. 111 Squadron RAF, and received a Bar to his DSO on 6 October. On 1 July 1934 he was promoted to wing commander, and on 15 August was appointed Officer Commanding, No. 10 (B) Squadron RAF, based at RAF Boscombe Down. On 22 March 1937 he was appointed Officer Commanding, RAF Hornchurch, taking command on 2 April, and on 1 July 1938 he was promoted to group captain. On 2 August 1938 he was appointed Senior Air Staff Officer of No. 23 (Training) Group, based at RAF Grantham.

== Second World War ==
On 1 September 1940 Frew was appointed Air Officer Commanding, Training Headquarters, South African Air Force. On 1 December 1940 he was promoted to temporary air commodore, and again to acting air vice marshal on 16 September 1942, when he assumed the position of AOC, Directorate of Air Training, SAAF.

Frew was made a Companion of the Bath on 1 January 1943, and on 1 June was promoted from air commodore (acting air vice marshal) to temporary air vice marshal. On 16 September 1943 his rank of acting air commodore was made war substantive, and from 24 September was permitted to wear insignia of a Commander in the Royal Order of George I with Swords, conferred "in recognition of valuable services rendered in connection with the war" by the King of the Hellenes.

On 15 June 1945 Frew was granted permission to wear the Military Cross, 1st class, conferred by the Belgian government. On 1 January 1946 he was promoted from air commodore (temporary air vice marshal) to air vice marshal, and on 1 January 1948 was made a Knight Commander of the Order of the British Empire. Frew retired from the RAF at his own request on 19 December 1948.

Air Vice Marshal Frew died in Pretoria, South Africa, on 28 May 1974.

== Citations ==
Military Cross
Temporary Second Lieutenant Matthew Brown Frew, General List and RFC.
For conspicuous gallantly and devotion to duty on patrol, showing a fine offensive spirit in many combats. He has shot down five enemy aeroplanes, on one occasion leading his formation to attack twenty-two Albatross Scouts, and himself shooting one down.

Bar to Military Cross
Temporary Second Lieutenant Matthew Brown Frew, MC, General List and RFC.
For conspicuous gallantry and devotion to duty in shooting down three enemy machines in two days. He has destroyed eight enemy machines and driven down many others out of control.

Distinguished Service Order
Temporary Captain Matthew Brown Frew, MC, General List and RFC.
For conspicuous gallantry and devotion to duty. On one occasion when leader of a patrol he shot down an enemy aeroplane, two others being also accounted for in the same fight. On a later occasion he destroyed three enemy machines in one combat, all of which were seen to crash to the ground. Immediately after this combat he had to switch off his engine and make an attempt to glide towards our lines five miles away on account of his machine having received a direct hit. Owing to the great skill and courage he displayed in the handling of his damaged machine, he succeeded in bringing it safely to our lines. He has destroyed twenty-two enemy machines up to date.
