= Stefan Fejes =

Austro-Hungarian flying ace

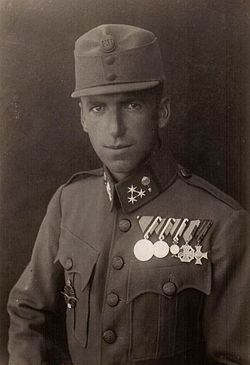
- Born: 30 August 1891; Győr, Hungary
- Died: Post 1949
- Military career
- Branch: Luftfahrtruppen
- Service years: 1912–1919; 1928–ca 1929; 1941–1945
- Rank: Feldwebel
- Nickname: "Fejes Bacsi" (Uncle Fejes)
- Units: Fliegercompanie 19, Fliegercompanie 51J
- Awards: Gold Bravery Medal (3 awards), Silver Bravery Medal (2 First Class awards, 1 Second Class award)
- Other work: Flew for Red Air Corps

Feldwebel Stefan Fejes was an Austro-Hungarian flying ace credited with 16 confirmed and 4 unconfirmed aerial victories during World War I. By war's end, he had not only received numerous decorations, he had been personally promoted by his emperor.

When Austria-Hungary dissolved at war's end, Fejes became a Hungarian citizen. He defended his new nation against invasion in the aftermath of World War I. He continued in aviation throughout World War II, as a commercial civil pilot, a military instructor, and a military transport and liaison pilot.

== Early life and service ==
Stefan Fejes was born in Győr, Hungary on 30 August 1891. He reported for his Austro-Hungarian national service military obligation in 1912, and was posted to infantry service. At the start of World War I, he went into battle with them. In September 1914, he was wounded so seriously that it took him six months to recover. He was then assigned to motor transport on 10 March 1915. He lasted in this posting for 14 months; he then transferred to the Luftfahrtruppen.

== World War I aviation service ==
Fejes completed pilot's training in early 1917. On 3 February 1917, he was then assigned to Flik 19 at Haidenschaft as a Sergeant Pilot flying Hansa-Brandenburg C.I two-seater aircraft. Flik 19 was commanded by Adolf Heyrowsky and was a general purpose squadron operating a mixed bag of planes for a wide range of missions including photographic reconnaissance, aerial observation, and bombing raids. Although aerial combat was not the unit's primary purpose, it had such aces as Franz Rudorfer, Benno Fiala von Fernbrugg, and Ludwig Hautzmayer on its strength.

Fejes scored his first aerial victory on only his third operational sortie. After this promising start, he became an ace piloting the two-seater, as he and his observers downed five Italian planes together. Fejes won the Silver Bravery Medal Second Class, followed by two additional First Class awards. His dogfight on 19 June 1917 may have been the fount of one of these awards; that was the day that Fejes and Josef Pürer singlehandedly took on a flight of Italian Nieuport fighters, claiming two and having their own plane downed near Schönpass in the process. Certainly, Fejes' reputation with his superiors did not hurt; they evaluated him as "earnest, modest, industrious, dependable" with good technical knowledge but a poor command of German. That his victories were scored in the course of the usual duties of a reconnaissance squadron could not fail to impress.

In early October 1917, Fejes was transferred to a dedicated fighter unit, Flik 51J at Ghirano, Prata di Pordenone, as part of a migration of Flik 19's aces to fighter duty. Once there, he was promoted to Feldwebel in February 1918. At his new unit, he switched mounts to an Albatros D.III fighter plane and continued his victory streak. A slight wound in the heel suffered during a prolonged dogfight within view of his home airfield on 20 March 1918 did not sidetrack him; he landed victorious, with 46 bullet holes in his plane. Eventually, he ran his tally to 16 confirmed victories; while doing so, he won three awards of Austria-Hungary's highest decoration for enlisted troops, the Gold Bravery Medal, in January, June, and July 1918. He also won a promotion to Stabsfeldwebel from his Emperor's own hands in July 1918.

== Post World War I ==
With the dissolution of Austria-Hungary at the end of the war, Fejes became a Hungarian citizen. When Hungary was invaded by Romania, Serbia, and Czechoslovakia, Fejes helped fight the intruders. He flew a Fokker D.VII for the 8th Squadron of the Red Air Corps; Johann Risztics and Alexander Kasza served with him. In May 1919, mechanical failure during a ground attack mission at Losoncz dropped him into captivity until the end of hostilities later that year.

By 1920, he was free again, flying a mock dogfight against Johann Risztics in the Budapest Air Show on 7 November. By 1928, he was an instructor at a clandestine training center for the Hungarian Air Force at Szombathely, where students fondly nicknamed him "Fejes Bacsi", or "Uncle Fejes" because of his genial gentlemanly manner.

From 1930–1936, he flew commercially between Zurich, Rome, and Milan. After transferring to the Hungarian Malert airline, he continued to fly as a civil pilot until 1940.

On 26 June 1941, Fejes was reactivated for World War II; he served as a military transport and command liaison pilot for the duration of hostilities. At war's end, he returned to Budapest. He is believed to have survived there until at least the 1950s.

== List of aerial victories ==
Confirmed victories are numbered. Unconfirmed victories are marked "u/c".

No.	Date/time	Aircraft	Foe	Result	Location	Notes
1	17 April 1917	Hansa-Brandenburg C.I two-seater reconnaissance plane serial number 29.09	Italian Nieuport fighter	Crashed and wrecked	Vicinity of Gorizia, Italy's train station	Victory shared with Adolf Heyrowsky, Josef Pürer
2	14 May 1917 @ 0730 hours	Hansa-Brandenburg C.I	Italian Nieuport fighter (Tenente Francesco Broili - 76a Squadriglia)		Merna	Victory shared with observer Alexander Tahy
3	20 May 1917 @ 0815 hours	Hansa-Brandenburg C.I s/n 29.63	Italian Spad fighter		Britof, Slovenia	
4	19 June 1917	Hansa-Brandenburg C.I s/n 29.63	Nieuport fighter		Vrtojba	Victory shared with observer Josef Pürer
u/c	19 June 1917	Hansa-Brandenburg C.I s/n 29.63	Nieuport fighter	Last seen in vertical dive	Vrtojba	Because of battle damage, Fejes made a forced landing after combat
5	26 June 1917 @ 0920 hours	Hansa-Brandenburg C.I s/n 29.63	Caudron reconnaissance plane	Crashed	Vrtojba	Victory shared with observer Alexander Tahy; also Adolf Heyrowsky and another pilot
6	Morning of 3 December 1917	Albatros D.III fighter	Observation balloon	Set afire	Visnadello, Spresiano, Italy	Victory shared with Eugen Bönsch
7	9 December 1917	Albatros D.III fighter	Italian SAML S2 two-seater reconnaissance machine		Treviso, Italy	Shared victory
8	10 December 1917	Albatros D.III fighter	English enemy aircraft		Candelù	
9	18 March 1918 past noon	Albatros D.III fighter s/n 153.132	Sopwith Camel fighter	Crashed	West of Salgareda, Italy	Shared victory
10	22 March 1918	Albatros D.III fighter	Royal Aircraft Factory R.E.8 two-seater reconnaissance plane		Susegana-Saletto, Italy	Shared victory
11	30 March 1918	Albatros D.III fighter s/n 153.42	Sopwith Camel fighter	Forced to land	Vicinity of Oderzo	Fejes wounded in action
12	17 April 1918	Albatros D.III fighter s/n 153.28	Sopwith Camel fighter	Probable victim W. G. Hargrave killed in action	Arcade, Italy	
13	1 May 1918	Albatros D.III fighter s/n 153.42	Sopwith Camel fighter		Breda di Piave, Italy	
u/c	3 May 1918	Albatros D.III fighter s/n 153.40	French two-seater reconnaissance plane		Arcade, Italy	
u/c	3 May 1918	Albatros D.III fighter s/n 153.55	Observation balloon	Destroyed	Northwest of Monastier di Treviso, Italy	
14	22 May 1918	Albatros D.III fighter s/n 153.42	Sopwith Camel fighter		East of Spresiano, Italy	
15	15 June 1918	Albatros D.III fighter	Spad		Arcade, in vicinity of Italian 33rd Infantry Division	
16	1 September 1918	Albatros D.III fighter s/n 253.54	Sopwith Camel fighter		Arcade, Italy	
u/c	1 September 1918	Albatros D.III fighter			Candelu	

== See also ==
- Aerial victory standards of World War I
- List of World War I flying aces from Austria-Hungary
