= Georg Kenzian =

Austro-Hungarian fighter ace

George Kenzian (Georg Kenzian Edler von Kenzianshausen)
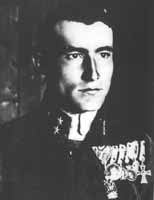
- Kenzian, c. 1918
- Born: 1894; Linz, Austria-Hungary
- Died: 1953 (aged 58–59); Vienna, Austria
- Military career
- Allegiance: Austria-Hungary
- Branch: Engineers; aviation
- Rank: Oberleutnant
- Units: Engineer Battalion Nr. 2, Fliegerkompanie 24, Fliegerkompanie 55J, Red Air Corps
- Commands: Fliegerkompanie 68J, Fliegerkompanie 42J
- Awards: Order of the Iron Crown, Gold Bravery Medal for Officers, Military Merit Cross, Silver Military Merit Medal, Iron Cross

Oberleutnant Georg Kenzian Edler von Kenzianshausen followed his father's profession of arms, and served the Austro-Hungarian Empire during World War I. He became a fighter ace, scoring eight aerial victories. After the dissolution of Austria-Hungary in the aftermath of World War I, he became a citizen of German Austria and defended his new nation against invasion.

== Early life and service ==
Georg Kenzian Edler von Kenzianshausen was born in Linz, Austria in 1894. He was the son of an army officer, and had aspirations of following his father's profession. In 1913, Kenzian joined Engineer Battalion Nr. 2 of the Austro-Hungarian Army. By the time World War I began, he had been commissioned as an officer; he went into action against the Russians. He was wounded on 18 December 1914. After healing, he returned to the Engineers and was promoted to Oberleutnant in September 1915. Shortly after this, he volunteered for the Luftfahrtruppen.

== World War I aerial service ==
Beginning in February 1916, Kenzian trained as an aerial observer and in April was posted to Fliegerkompanie 24 at the Pergine Valsugana Airfield on the South Tyrol front. On 16 June 1916, Kenzian scored his first victory. After a second win, while manning the gun in the rear seat of József Kiss's Hansa-Brandenburg two-seater, Kenzian and his pilot were shot down and wounded on 27 July. It took Kenzian three months to recuperate; during this period, he was awarded the Order of the Iron Crown Third Class with War Decoration and Swords.

In the midst of February 1917, Kenzian was assigned to the aviation school at Wiener-Neustadt in the dual capacities of student pilot and aerial observer instructor. By July, he was qualified as a pilot, having earned Austrian Pilot's Certificate number 721 on the 12th. In August, he was packed off to Fliegerkompanie 55J as its deputy commander under Josef von Maier. Kenzian would score seven more victories while with Flik 55J, and be awarded the Gold Bravery Medal for Officers and the Military Merit Cross, Third Class. The squadron would serve so well at Haidenschaft and Pergine that it was dubbed the Kaiser Staffel (Emperor's Squadron).

On 4 May 1918, Karl Patzelt's death in action left Fliegerkompanie 68J leaderless. Kenzian was granted command of the fighter squadron at Colle Umberto and led it into combat over the Battle of the Piave in June. He won the Silver Military Merit Medal with Swords. In October 1918, he was transferred to command of Fliegerkompanie 42J at Pinzano when its commander was KIA, and led it until war's end.

== Post World War I ==
As the war ended, Kenzian switched his fighting efforts to repelling Slovenians invading Carinthia in southern Austria; he served with the German-Austrian Republic aerial forces until the conflict ended in June 1919. He found himself flying general service again, dropping leaflets, observing enemy movements, dropping bombs, and intercepting opposing aircraft. The Treaty of Saint Germain in September 1919 not only ended the conflict, but also the German-Austrian air arm.

Kenzian died of a heart attack in Vienna in 1953.

== List of aerial victories ==
Numbered victories are confirmed. Unconfirmed victories are noted by "u/c".

No.	Date/time	Aircraft	Foe	Result	Location	Notes
1	16 June 1916	Hansa-Brandenburg C.I serial number 61.18	Italian Farman two-seater reconnaissance craft	Forced to land	South of Asiago	
2	20 June 1916 @ 1200 hours	Hansa-Brandenburg C.I s/n 61.23	Farman	Forced to land; crew WIA	Monte Cimone	
3	29 September 1917	Albatros D.III fighter	Italian Nieuport fighter	Forced to land	South of Plava	Victory shared with Eugen Bönsch and Alexander Tahy
4	18 November 1917	Albatros D.III fighter s/n 153.27	Nieuport fighter	Set afire	Arsiero-Villaverla	Victory shared with Franz Lahner and two other pilots
5	27 November 1917	Albatros D.III fighter s/n/153.27	Italian S.A.M.L reconnaissance two-seater	Set afire; pilot probably KIA	South of Asiago	Victory shared with József Kiss
6	7 December 1917	Albatros D.III fighter	S.A.M.L two-seater	Set afire; aircrew believed KIA	South of Asiago	Victory shared with two other pilots
7	12 January 1918	Albatros D.III fighter	Royal Aircraft Factory R.E.8 s/n A.4445	Forced to land; captured	Casa Rigoni	Victory shared with József Kiss and Alexander Kasza
8	26 January 1918	Albatros D.III fighter s/n 153.07	Sopwith fighter	Forced to land	Cia Pralunga	
9	24 March 1918	Albatros D.III fighter	Sopwith fighter	Spiraled in to crash	Val d'Assa	

== See also ==
- Aerial victory standards of World War I
