= Alexander Tahy =

Hungarian World War I flying ace

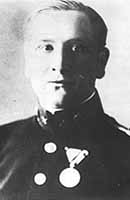
- Born: 1896; Nyíregyháza, Austria-Hungary (now Hungary)
- Died: 7 March 1918 (aged 21); Mansuè, Italy
- Military career
- Allegiance: Austria-Hungary
- Branch: Artillery; Austro-Hungarian Aviation Troops
- Rank: Oberleutnant
- Units: Fliegerkkompanie 12; Fliegerkompanie 19; Fliegerkompanie 51J
- Awards: Knight's Cross of the Order of Leopold with War Decorations and Swords; Military Merit Cross with War Decorations and Swords; Silver 1st Class Medal for Bravery; Silver and Bronze Military Merit Medal

Oberleutnant Alexander Tahy (9 April 1896 – 7 March 1918) was a Hungarian World War I flying ace credited with eight aerial victories while serving with the Austro-Hungarian Aviation Troops. He began the war as an artilleryman, winning the Silver Medal for Bravery in May 1915. In early 1916, he transferred to aviation duty as an aerial observer. Between 3 December 1916 and 26 June 1917, he was credited with five aerial victories for Fliegerkompanie 19, earning another three decorations. Having taught himself to fly, he transferred to a fighter unit, Fliegerkompanie 51J for his last three victories. On 7 March 1918, Tahy died in a flying accident. His greatest honor came after his death, when he was awarded the Knight's Cross of the Order of Leopold with War Decorations and Swords.

== Military career ==
=== Artilleryman ===
Alexander Tahy was born in Nyíregyháza, Hungary, in 1896. When war began, he volunteered for service and became an artilleryman in Hungarian Heavy Howitzer Division No. 6. His valor was rewarded with the Silver Medal for Bravery First Class in May 1915. In late January 1916, he was stationed in the reserve battery of his unit.

=== Service as an aerial observer ===
In early 1916, Tahy transferred to the Austro-Hungarian Aviation Troops as an aerial observer. From July to September 1916, he was training. Upon graduating, he was posted to Fliegerkkompanie 12 (Flik 12), but found he could not agree with his commanding officer. Tahy soon passed onward to another unit on Haidenschaft Airfield, Fliegerkompanie 19 (Flik 19). Commanded by Adolf Heyrowsky, Flik 19 had on its rolls Benno Fiala von Fernbrugg, Stefan Fejes, Franz Rudorfer, Ludwig Hautzmayer, and Josef Pürer. Despite its plethora of aces, Flik 19 was not a fighter squadron. As a general services unit, their missions varied among reconnaissance, photographic intelligence, liaison, protective escorts, artillery direction, bombing, and ground attacks. The demands on their flying time surged and ebbed as the Battles of the Isonzo waxed and waned.

On 3 December 1916, Tahy scored his first aerial victory, forcing an Italian Caproni into landing in the vicinity of Gorizia. In mid-summer 1917, he would be credited with downing three Nieuport fighters, one each on 11 May, 14 May, and 3 June. Then, at 09:30 hours on 26 June 1917, he scored his last victory with Flik 19, downing a Caudron. His tenure at the squadron had earned him both the Bronze and Silver Military Merit Medals and the Military Merit Cross Third Class with War Decorations and Swords. Tahy learned to fly through informal on the job training.

=== Service as a pilot ===
Fliegerkompanie 51J (Flik 51J), a dedicated fighter squadron, was established at the field in September, 1917. Tahy wangled a posting to the new unit. As one of their pilots, Tahy used an Albatros D.III fighter to set aflame an Italian observation balloon for his sixth victory on 28 September 1917. Tahy pressed home his attack at a mere 700 meters altitude through heavy antiaircraft fire and fighter opposition for his win.

He was victorious over another Nieuport fighter the following day. However, his new commanding officer was unimpressed with his flying skills, and remanded him for three months formal pilot training. Upon his return from training, he scored his final victory on 21 February 1918, downing a Sopwith Camel in flames. Eugen Bönsch shared in the win.

On 7 March 1918, Tahy died in a flying accident over Mansuè, Italy; his Albatros D.III abruptly and unexpectedly spun in and crashed. His greatest honor came after his death, when he was awarded the Knight's Cross of the Order of Leopold with War Decorations and Swords.
