= Josef Pürer =

Austro-Hungarian World War I flying ace

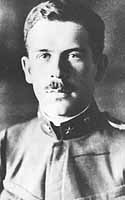
- Born: 20 October 1894; Schönau, Austria, or Brno Moravia
- Died: 31 August 1918 (Age: 23)
- Military career
- Allegiance: Austro-Hungarian Empire
- Branch: Field Howitzer Division; Austro-Hungarian Aviation Troops
- Rank: Oberleutnant
- Units: 2nd Regiment, Field Howitzer Division; Fliegerkompanie 3J; Fliegerkompanie 19
- Awards: 2 awards of Military Merit Cross; 2 awards of the Military Merit Medal

Oberleutnant Josef Pürer (1894-1918) was an Austro-Hungarian World War I flying ace credited with six aerial victories. A volunteer for the artillery when the war began, he fought for two years on the Russian Front. He was commissioned as an officer on 1 January 1916; later that year he transferred to the Austro-Hungarian Aviation Troops. He served as an aerial observer in northern Italy until early 1918. After scoring six aerial victories, he was trained as a fighter pilot by 11 July 1918. He was killed in action by Sidney Cottle on 31 August 1918.

== Early life ==
Josef Pürer was born on 20 October 1894 within the Austro-Hungarian Empire. His exact birthplace is disputed; it is given as either Schönau, Austria or Brno, Moravia.

== Military career ==
=== Service with artillery ===
Pürer volunteered for military service at the start of World War I. He was assigned to Austro-Hungarian Howitzer Field Howitzer Regiment No 2. His two years doughty service with this unit on the Russian Front brought him a Bronze Military Merit Medal and commissioning as an officer. He was promoted to Leutnant in der Reserve (second lieutenant in the reserves) on 1 January 1916.

=== Aviation duty ===
See also Aerial victory standards of World War I

==== As an aerial observer ====
In 1916, Pürer transferred to the Austro-Hungarian Aviation Troops to become an aerial observer. In July, he was assigned to the Fliegeroffiziersschule (Air Officers School) in Wiener-Neustadt, Austria for training. By early November, he was qualified as an observer. He was posted to Fliegerkompanie 19 in northern Italy where they were fighting the Battles of the Isonzo as a general services squadron. Commanded by Hauptmann (Captain) Adolf Heyrowsky, Fliegerkompanie 19 was considered the best two-seater aerial reconnaissance unit in the Austro-Hungarian Aviation Troops. It was replete with aces: Stefan Fejes, Benno Fiala Ritter von Fernbrugg, Alexander Tahy, Franz Rudorfer, Ludwig Hautzmayer, as well as Adolf Heyrowsky. The squadron flew photography, communication liaison, artillery cooperation, ground attack, and bombing missions. Pürer would man the rear gun in the two-seater aerial reconnaissance Hansa-Brandenburg C.I aircraft, as well as observing, for any pilots needing a second crew member. He was considered one of the squadron's better observers.

On 18 November 1916, Josef Pürer scored his first aerial victory. He shot down an Italian-manned Voisin two-seater aerial reconnaissance airplane within Austro-Hungarian territory, near San Marcos. On 28 December, he shot down another Voisin while being piloted by Adolf Heyrowsky. It crashed near Konstanjevica and Gorizia west of San Marcos, in no man's land.

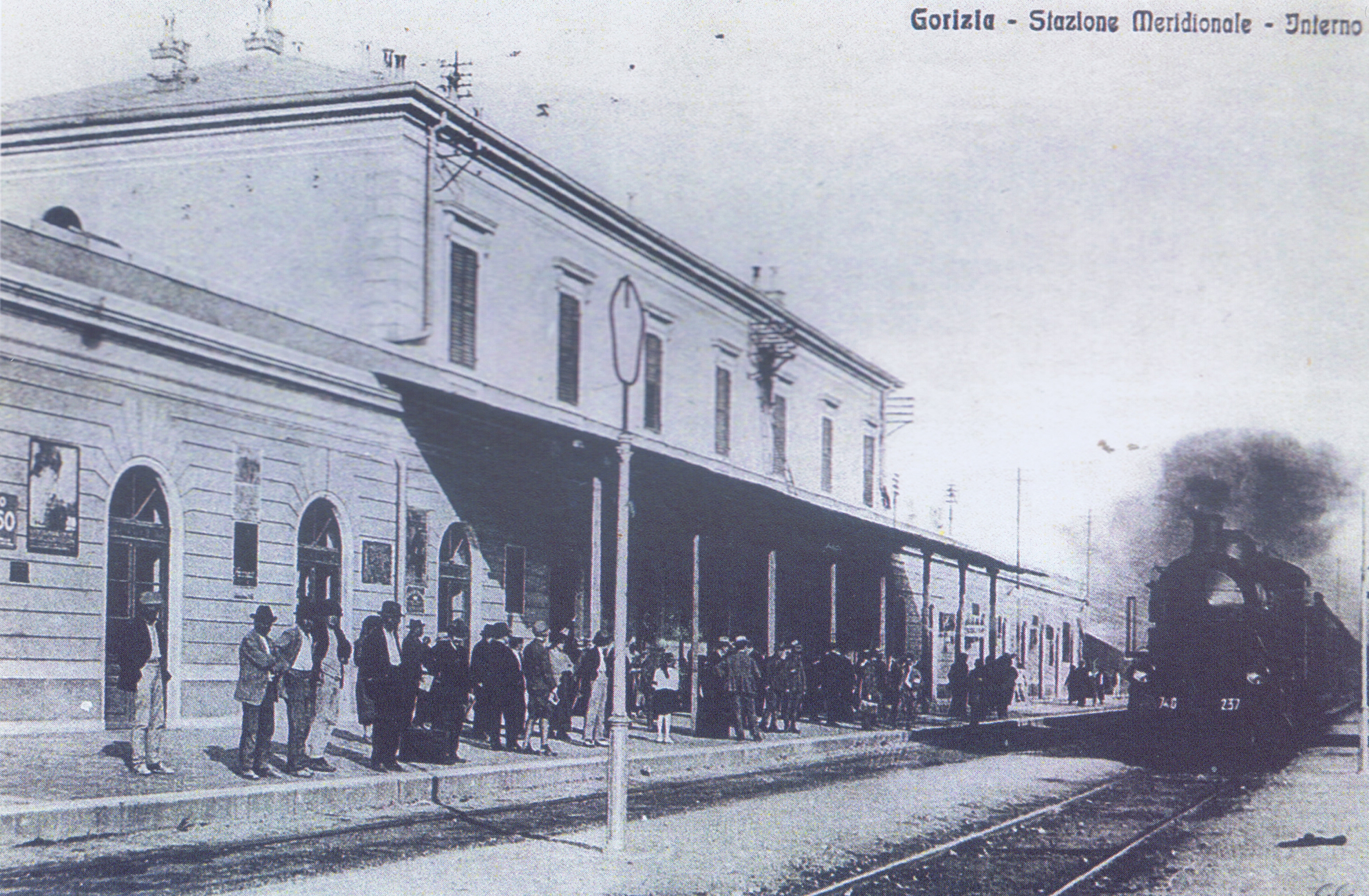
Josef Pürer's third victim impacted near the Gorizia Centrale railway station.

He would not score again until 28 February 1917, when he was credited with downing an Italian Farman two-seater. On 17 April 1917, with Adolf Heyrowsky again piloting, Pürer destroyed an attacking Nieuport single-seat fighter; its impact was near the Gorizia Centrale railway station. At 0930 hours on 3 June 1918, Pürer killed an Italian pilot attacking with a Nieuport fighter to become an ace; the victim crashed in Italian territory, but was confirmed by prisoner of war interrogations.

On 19 June 1918, Pürer was flying as Stefan Fejes's observer when they were assaulted by Italian Nieuport fighters. The Austro-Hungarian air crew downed one of them; it fell near Vertojba. They also shot it out with a second Nieuport, but that combat claim went unconfirmed. The aerial battle ended with their Hansa-Brandenburg C.I so bullet-holed it was forced to crashland near Schoenpass.

For his service with Fliegerkompanie 19, he was awarded the Military Merit Cross Third Class with War Decoration. Then, in August 1917, he was transferred to Fleiegerkompanie 29 in Romania, only to fall ill. When recovered, he was shipped to Fleiegerkompanie 57F. He was granted a second Military Merit Cross while serving with them.

==== Death as a fighter pilot ====
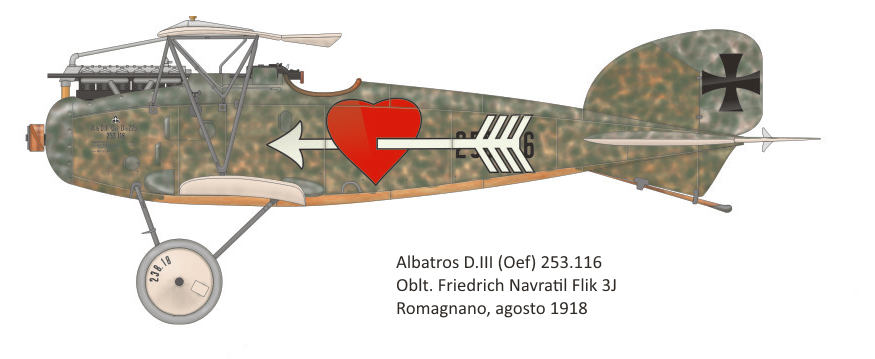
The Albatros D.III of Miroslav Navratil, leader of the fatal patrol

In 1918, Pürer went for pilot training. When he finished training, he was awarded Austrian Pilot Certificate No. 288 on 11 July. He was then posted to a fighter squadron, Fliegerkompanie 3J, commanded by ace Miroslav Navratil.

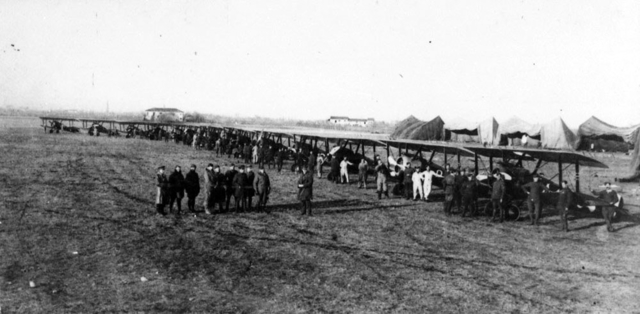
Members of No. 45 Squadron RAF at Istrana Air Base, Italy, 1917

On 31 August 1918, Navratil led a patrol of six Albatros D.III fighters from Fliegerkompanie 3J. When Navatril spotted an enemy British two-seater plane he dove on it, accompanied by the other experienced pilot in the patrol, Stefan Stec. The four rookie fighter pilots, which included Pürer, lost track of Navatril and Stec despite their orders to stick close to their leader. C Flight of No. 45 Squadron RAF found the strays; in short order, a pair of British aces in Sopwith Camels shot down all four. Pürer's fallen aircraft disintegrated on a hillside near Ponte Strenta. Josef Pürer was Lieutenant Sidney Cottle's tenth victim.

== Aftermath ==
The death of Josef Pürer and his three companions so traumatized Navratil that it well-nigh grounded him; he flew only one sortie in the two months after the loss of the quartet, during which he injured himself in a wreck and was out for action for the rest of the war.
