= Josef von Maier =

Austro-Hungarian World War I flying ace

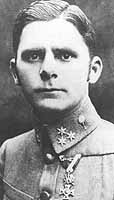
- Born: 11 May 1889; Bratislava (now Slovak Republic)
- Died: 7 May 1958 (aged 68); Argentina
- Military career
- Allegiance: Austro-Hungarian Empire
- Branch: Austro-Hungarian Aviation Troops
- Rank: Hauptmann (Captain)
- Units: Fliegerkompanie 16; Fliegerkompanie 14; Fliegerkompanie 13
- Commands: Fliegerkompanie 55J
- Awards: Order of the Iron Crown; Military Merit Medal; Order of Leopold
- Other work: Pioneer cargo pilot; further military service

Hauptmann József von Maier (11 May 1889 – 7 May 1958), after 1922 József Modory, was an Austro-Hungarian World War I flying ace credited with seven aerial victories.

== Early life and prewar service ==
József von Maier, despite his Germanic name, was born of Hungarian parents in 1889 in what was then Poszony and is now Bratislava. He joined the Austro-Hungarian Engineer Battalion No. 5 before World War I, and was serving as an Oberleutnant (First lieutenant) when war broke out.

== Service as an aerial observer ==
Early on, Maier transferred to the Austro-Hungarian Aviation Troops. He was posted to Fliegerkompanie 14 (Flik 14) on the Russian Front. As an officer, he was tasked with being an aerial observer while directing his pilot. In the early days of the war, on 12 August 1914, Maier and his pilot were brought down behind Russian lines by a malfunctioning engine while on a reconnaissance mission. A coolant leak caused the Lohner B.V's engine to seize. They burnt their aircraft to deny it to the enemy, and evaded Cossack patrols to return to their own lines.

== Service as a reconnaissance pilot ==
In Spring 1915, Maier applied for pilot training. He was sent to Fliegerkompanie 166 for training. By 1 September, he was trained, thus receiving Austrian Pilot Certificate No. 205. His first posting as a pilot was to return to the Russian Front to Fliegerkompanie 13 as deputy commander in October 1915. It was a Hansa-Brandenburg C.I unit; in August 1916, it was transferred to Romania. While serving with it, he received both Bronze and Silver Military Merit Medals, as well as the Order of the Iron Crown, Third Class with War Decorations and Swords.

== Service as a fighter pilot ==
In April 1917, Maier requested transfer to a fighter unit and was obliged with command of Fliegerkompanie 55J (Flik 55J) in northern Italy. This new unit was one of the first Austro-Hungarian dedicated fighter units. Although new, it was established with several advantages. Its new Albatros D.III fighters were somewhat superior to opposing aircraft. As a leader, Maier had a knack for dampening down ethnic and class tensions among the personnel. And it was founded with a mixture of experienced aces and promising newcomers. Its roster included Georg Kenzian, Franz Lahner, Alexander Kasza, József Kiss, and Julius Arigi. The squadron would soon earn the nickname Kaiser-Staffel, or Kaiser Squadron.

Established at Haidenschaft in August 1917 to operate in the Battles of the Isonzo, it shifted in late October to Peregrine Airfield in the Tyrol. Two of the pilots posted to Maier's new unit were aces József Kiss and Julius Arigi.

The three of them flew together in their Albatros D.IIIs for tactical reasons. On 15 November 1917, the trio attacked a formation of four Italian Caproni bombers; three of these were shot down in flames and Maier was credited with two victories. Two days later, Maier and his wingmen shot down two reconnaissance machines, an Italian Savoia-Pomilio and a SAML south of Asiago-Arsiero. The next day, 18 November, Maier became an ace when the three Austro-Hungarian aces set another Savoia-Pomilio on fire over Monte Cengio. On 7 December 1917, he finished his victory string with his two last victories, a two-seater forced to land in Italian territory, and another one downed in flames. These were scored in conjunction with Arigi and Kiss.

Subsequently, Maier was promoted to Hauptmann (captain) and awarded the prestigious Knight's Cross of the Order of Leopold with War Decorations and Swords; he was one of only 25 Austro-Hungarian so honored. In September 1918, he was withdrawn from front line duty to command the Austro-Hungarian Fighter School. He was still serving there when the war ended.

== Postwar career ==
As the Austro-Hungarian Empire dissolved into smaller constituent states, Maier was faced with choosing a nationality. He became a Hungarian citizen, changing his name to József Modory. He learned Hungarian, though he retained a strong Austrian accent. He served briefly in the Red Air Corps during 1919, repelling Romanian, Czech, and Serbian invaders. Following that, he became an air cargo pilot for Malert, while maintaining an interest in sporting aviation. He served on the Board of Directors of the Aero Sport Club of Budapest's Technical University during the 1920s.

At some point, he returned to military service. In 1935, he was commanding the Combat School in Szombathely. In 1938, he was appointed as superintendent of the Air Force Academy. Maier/Modory retired at the rank of colonel in 1944.
