= Ludwig Hautzmayer =

Austro-Hungarian World War I flying ace

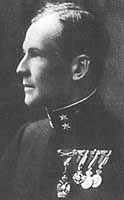
- Born: 25 April 1893; Fürstenfeld, Austria
- Died: 9 December 1936 (aged 43); Croydon, England
- Military career
- Allegiance: Austro-Hungarian Empire
- Branch: Austro-Hungarian Aviation Troops
- Rank: Oberleutnant
- Units: Fliegerkompanie 15; Fliegerkompanie 19; Fliegerkompanie 51J
- Commands: Fliegerkompanie 61J
- Conflicts: Russian Front, Serbia, Isonzo Front
- Awards: Order of the Iron Crown; Military Merit Cross; Military Merit Medal; Medal for Bravery; Order of Leopold
- Other work: Airline pilot for Malert

Oberleutnant Ludwig Hautzmayer (25 April 1893 - 9 December 1936) was an Austro-Hungarian World War I flying ace credited with seven aerial victories. He was a prewar reserve infantry officer; when war broke out, he fought until suffering a severe leg wound on 8 September 1914. When recovered, he transferred to the Austro-Hungarian Aviation Troops as an aerial observer in March, 1915. After 40 combat missions on the Eastern Front, he underwent fighter pilot training. Once qualified, he was posted to the Isonzo Front, where he became an ace. Appointed commander of his own fighter squadron, Flik 61J, he was one of the few reserve officers so entrusted as a leader. After scoring two more victories, he ended the war with multiple decorations, up to the Order of Leopold. Postwar, he flew as an airline pilot for Malert until killed in a crash at Croydon, England on 9 December 1936.

== Early life ==
Ludwig Hautzmayer was born on 25 April 1893 in Fürstenfeld, Austria. He studied mechanical engineering at the Technical University in Graz. He was an active sportsman, enjoying motorcycle racing, mountaineering, and swimming.

== Infantry service ==
He was serving in the 7th Infantry Regiment as a reserve officer with war broke out. He went into combat on the Russian Front and suffered a serious leg wound on 8 September 1914. After convalescing, he transferred to the Austro-Hungarian Aviation Troops.

== Aviation service ==
=== As an observer ===
Hautzmayer trained as an aerial observer at Aspern Airfield. In March 1915, he was assigned to Fliegerkompanie 15 (Flik 15) in the dual roles of aerial observer and technical officer. Flik 15 was posted to the Russian Front. In May 1915, Flik 15 (including Ludwig Hautzmayer) was instrumental in directing artillery barrages essential to the success of Field Marshal August von Mackensen's Galician offensive. The Field Marshal then campaigned in Serbia later in the year; again Hautzmayer was in the air in his Albatros B.I. Hautzmayer flew 40 combat missions with Flik 15 during these battles. An evaluation of his military performance read:

"He is unusually keen, a born daredevil, loving danger. He is self-assured, a welcome partner in any aircraft's crew, a beloved comrade, always cheerful, and youthfully indefatigable."

Hautzmayer was awarded both the Bronze and Silver Military Merit Medals while with Flik 15.

=== As a pilot ===
In November 1915, he began fighter pilot training; by February 1916, he finished. He was immediately posted to the Isonzo Front to Fliegerkompanie 19 (Flik 19), a new general service squadron commanded by Hauptmann (captain) Adolf Heyrowsky. Flik 19 operated both two-seat reconnaissance airplanes and single-seat fighters. It was one of the latter, a Fokker Eindecker, flown on his first combat sortie, that Hautzmayer used to force down and capture an Italian Caproni bomber for his initial victory.

His second victory came on 29 April 1916, when he was flying a two-seat Hansa-Brandenburg C.I; his observer/gunner was Benno Fiala Ritter von Fernbrugg. When he shot down a Caudron on 9 August 1916, he was again flying the Fokker Eindecker. He would add only one more victory during 1917, downing a Caproni while flying an Albatros D.III fighter on 28 August. Nevertheless, during this stretch, Hautzmayer received for his valor two awards of the Military Merit Cross Third Class with War Decorations and Swords, the Order of the Iron Crown with War Decorations and Swords, and a promotion to Oberleutnant. In February 1918, he was transferred to a dedicated fighter squadron, Fliegerkompanie 51J. His fifth victory came with them on 13 March 1918, when he shared a win with his commanding officer, Fernbrugg.

=== In command ===
On 20 March 1918, Hautzmayer was transferred to another dedicated fighter squadron, Fliegerkompanie 61J. He was one of the first Austro-Hungarian reserve officers appointed to command. He led Flik 61J to war's end, scoring late victories on 7 and 27 October 1918 to run his total to seven.

== Postwar ==
During the chaos as the Austro-Hungarian Empire dissolved, Hautzmayer married a Hungarian woman, chose to become a Hungarian citizen, changed his name to Lajos Tatai, and began learning Magyar. He took a job as a pilot with Malert Air. On 6 December 1936, he crashed into a factory smokestack in dense fog while taking off from Croydon. He was buried in Vienna.
