= Sidney Cottle =

Sidney Joseph Cottle
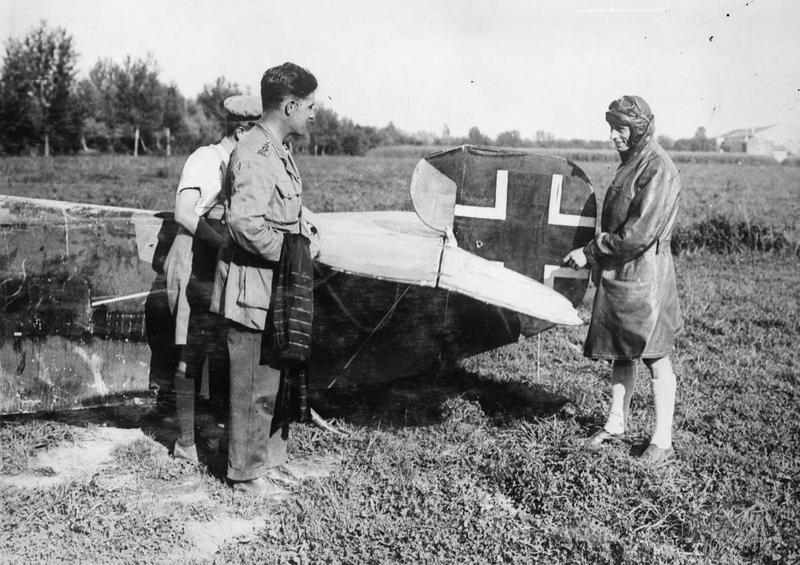
- "Captain John Cottle, M. C., No. 45 Squadron, explains detail of an Austrian Phoenix biplane which he brought down on his own aerodrome."
- Born: 19 June 1892; Plymouth, Devon, England
- Died: 15 August 1967 (aged 75); India
- Military career
- Allegiance: United Kingdom
- Branch: Royal Air Force
- Service years: 1914–1944
- Rank: Group Captain
- Nicknames: Jack "The man with the funny elbows"
- Units: South African Mounted Rifles, No. 45 Squadron RFC/No. 45 Squadron RAF
- Awards: Member of the Order of the British Empire, Distinguished Flying Cross, Italian Silver Medal of Military Valor

Group Captain Sidney Joseph "Jack" Cottle MBE's military career began during World War I. He became a flying ace in the latter years of the war, credited with thirteen aerial victories. His service would span three decades and three continents before his final retirement in 1944.

== Early life and service ==
Although Cottle was English-born, while young he was moved to Zululand, where he grew up. He was dubbed "the man with the funny elbows" by the locals. In 1914, he enlisted in the South African Mounted Rifles. He served with them until he transferred into the Royal Flying Corps (RFC) in 1917.

== World War I flying service ==
He was commissioned in the RFC on 27 July 1917. He was forwarded to No. 45 Squadron RFC in Italy to fly a Sopwith Camel. On 10 March 1918, he and Richard Dawes destroyed an enemy DFW two-seater southeast of Salgarada. On 18 May, Cottle singlehandedly scored his second victory, setting an Albatros D.III afire. On 30 May 1918, Cottle was wounded in action. On 5 July 1918, Cottle set an LVG two-seater on fire; it was last seen still apparently under control. No score, though it was ruled "driven down". He did score twice more in July, though, becoming an ace on its last day. He scored three times in early August; then on the 31st he destroyed an Albatros D.III at 0935, killed Josef Pürer and driven his D.III down into captivity at 0940, driven a third D.III down into captivity at 0945, and drove an enemy reconnaissance two-seater down at 1035. The four wins pushed his total to eleven confirmed wins.

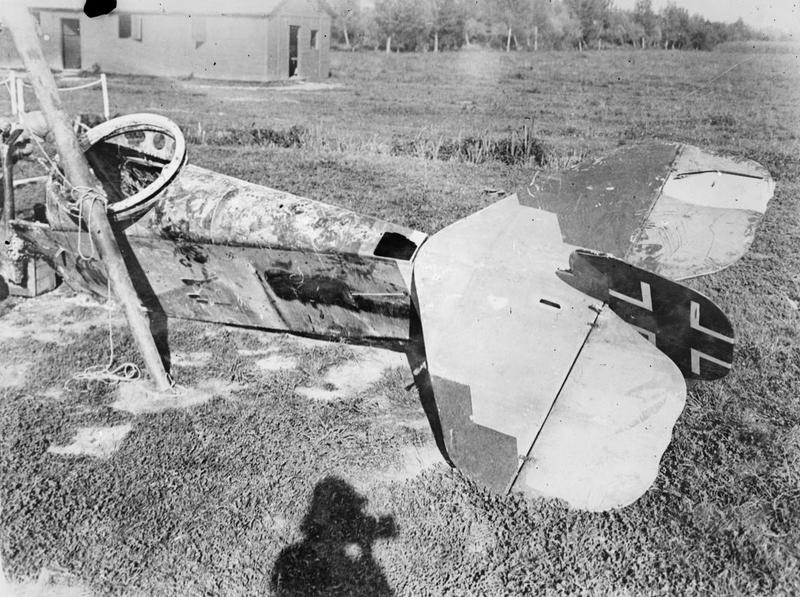
Another view of the aircraft brought down by Cottle

At this point, 45 Squadron shifted theaters, from Italy back to France, thus removing Cottle from combat for a time. Cottle then scored on both 3 and 5 November 1918, ending the war with thirteen confirmed victories and that one flaming unconfirmed.

== Post World War I life and service ==
Cottle stayed in the Royal Air Force and became a Flight Commander in No. 79 Squadron RAF in 1919. He then transferred into No. 48 Squadron RAF in India. He married a major in the Women's Indian Army. Cottle was then transferred to Iraq in 1924. In 1932, he was assigned to duty with the Egyptian Air Force. He was promoted to Group Captain in 1940 which was his rank on retirement on 21 June 1941. However, he was re-employed until 1944, when he finally retired. A few years later, he moved to India. He died there on 15 August 1967.

== Honors and awards ==
Sidney Joseph Cottle was awarded the MBE by his king for his service.

The text of the award citation for the Distinguished Flying Cross reads:

Lt. (T./Capt.) Jack Cottle. "On the 20th of August this officer engaged a two-seater, which crashed. On the evening of the same date he shot down another two-seater, which fell within our lines. In all he has destroyed or shot down seven enemy machines. He is a determined leader of patrols, and conspicuous for devotion to duty".

Sidney Joseph Cottle also was awarded the Silver Medal of Military Valor by a grateful Italian government in 1918.
