= Franz Lahner =

Austro-Hungarian World War I flying ace

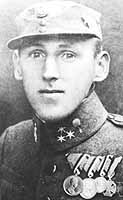
- Born: 1893; Bad Goisern, Austria
- Died: 19 July 1966; Linz, Austria
- Military career
- Allegiance: Austro-Hungarian Empire
- Branch: Austro-Hungarian Aviation Troops
- Rank: Offizier
- Nickname: "Papa Franz"
- Unit: Fliegerkompanie 55J
- Awards: 1 Gold and 2 Silver awards of Medal for Bravery; Karl Troop Cross
- Other work: Lumber merchant; Luftwaffe officer

Offizier Franz Lahner (1893–1966) was an Austro-Hungarian World War I flying ace credited with five aerial victories. Later in life, he was a lumber merchant and an officer at the Luftwaffe.

== In the beginning ==
Franz Lahner was born in Bad Goisern, Austria in 1893. He was called for military service when World War I began in 1914. In 1915, he spent 11 months front line combat duty with a rifle regiment.

== Aerial service ==
See also Aerial victory standards of World War I

He then transferred to aerial service and was trained as a pilot. On 26 July 1917, he was granted Austrian Pilot's Certificate No. 734. In mid-August, he was posted to Fliegerkompanie 55J as a fighter pilot on the Italian Front in time for the Battle of Caporetto.

Flying his personal Albatros D.III with personal insignia of a prominent figure '8' on the fuselage, Lahner sent an Italian Nieuport down in flames on 18 November 1917. Nine days later, an Italian SAML two-seater fell flaming from his guns. On 16 December, he flamed another SAML; he had help from József Kiss and Julius Arigi.

Lahner won a dogfight with an Italian Nieuport on 25 January 1918, sending it down behind enemy lines. His fifth victory came on 21 March 1918, over an Italian Sovoia-Pomilio two-seater reconnaissance craft. However, in turn, he was swarmed by enemy fighters and driven down behind his own lines. He was slightly injured, and his bullet-riddled plane destroyed by artillery. While Lahner flew for the rest of the war, that was his last aerial success.

During the last months of the war, Lahner took on much of the squadron's administration, earning him the grateful nickname "Papa Franz". By war's end, he had earned two Silver Medals for Bravery First Class, as well as a Gold Medal for Bravery.

== Post World War I ==
Postwar, Lahner served in the Police Squadron in Linz until it was quashed. He then became a lumber salesman. When World War II came along, Lahner was given command of a Luftwaffe ground unit. When that war ended, Lahner returned to selling lumber.

In his last years, Lahner was crippled by a stroke. Complications set in, and Franz Lahner died in Linz, Austria on 19 July 1966.

== Sources ==
- O'Connor, Martin (1994). Air Aces of the Austro-Hungarian Empire 1914 - 1918. Flying Machines Press. ISBN 978-0-9637110-1-4.
