= Richard Jeffries Dawes =

Canadian flying ace

- Born: 23 October 1897; Lachine, Quebec, Canada
- Died: 22 April 1983 (aged 85); Montreal, Canada
- Military career
- Allegiance: Canada
- Branch: Royal Flying Corps
- Rank: Captain
- Nickname: "Dickie"
- Units: No. 45 Squadron RAF; No. 28 Squadron RAF
- Awards: Distinguished Flying Cross

Richard Jeffries Dawes DFC (23 October 1897–22 April 1983) was a Canadian World War I flying ace credited with nine aerial victories.

== Early life ==
Richard Jeffries Dawes was born on 23 October 1897 in Lachine, Quebec, Canada. He joined the military for World War I, and ended up a Sopwith Camel pilot in the Royal Flying Corps.

== World War I ==
By late 1917, Dawes was posted to 45 Squadron on the Western Front as a pilot. He scored his first aerial victory on the Western Front before 45 Squadron was transferred to Italy. He became an ace with the squadron. Then, at about the time the Royal Flying Corps was being consolidated into the Royal Air Force, Dawes was transferred for a short spell to 28 Squadron, which was also in Italy. He scored a victory with them before transferring back to 45 Squadron. He wrapped up his tally with a final three wins with the unit in June 1918. His courage earned him a Distinguished Flying Cross, which was gazetted on 21 September 1918:

"During recent operations this officer has destroyed six enemy aeroplanes. A very gallant and courageous officer."

== List of aerial victories ==
See also Aerial victory standards of World War I

No.	Date/time	Aircraft	Foe	Result	Location	Notes
1	20 October 1917 @ 2040 hours	Sopwith Camel	Albatros D.III	Driven down out of control	Kastelhoek	
2	31 December 1917 @ 0945 hours	Sopwith Camel serial number B6412	Albatros D.III	Driven down out of control	Pieve de Soligo	
3	14 January 1918 @ 1500 hours	Sopwith Camel s/n B6412	Albatros D.III	Destroyed	Borgo	
4	27 January 1918 @ 1340 hours	Sopwith Camel s/n B6412	DFW reconnaissance plane	Driven down out of control	Conegliano	
5	10 March 1918 @ 1130 hours	Sopwith Camel s/n B6412	DFW reconnaissance plane	Destroyed	Southeast of Salgarada	Victory shared with Sidney Cottle
6	3 May 1918 @ 0915 hours	Sopwith Camel s/n B7359	Aviatik reconnaissance plane	Destroyed	Mt. Santo	Only victory scored while with 28 Squadron
7	3 June 1918 @ 0905 hours	Sopwith Camel s/n B6412	Albatros D.V	Driven down out of control	Campo	
8	7 June 1918 @ 0930 hours	Sopwith Camel s/n B6412	Albatros D.III	Destroyed	Piovena	
9	15 June 1918 @ 0745 hours	Sopwith Camel s/n B6412	Aviatik reconnaissance plane	Destroyed	Between Mt. Campo and Poselaro	

== Post World War I ==
Richard Jeffries Dawes lived until 22 April 1983, though details of his postwar life are unknown. He died in Montreal, Quebec, Canada.
