= József Kiss =

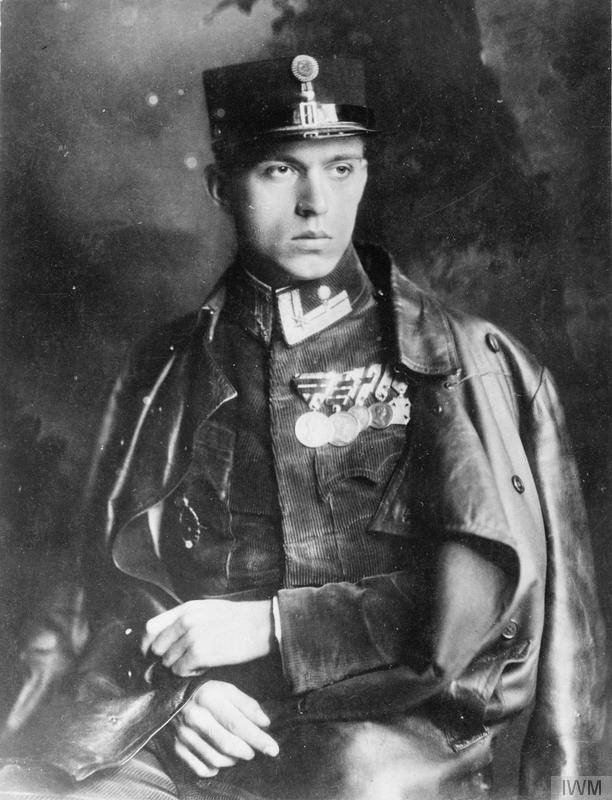
- Born: 26 January 1896; Pozsony, Kingdom of Hungary (today Bratislava, Slovakia)
- Died: 24 May 1918 (aged 22); Vicinity of Lamon, Italy
- Military career
- Allegiance: Austro-Hungarian Empire
- Branch: Aviation
- Rank: Lieutenant
- Nickname: Josi
- Units: Flik 24, Flik 55J
- Awards: 3 Gold and 4 Silver awards of Medal for Bravery

Lieutenant József Kiss de Elemér et Ittebe was a World War I flying ace for the Austro-Hungarian Empire. He was credited with 19 aerial victories. He was the most successful ace of Hungarian-Slovak descent in the war.

== Biography ==
Born 26 January 1896, Kiss's father was a gardener at the Pozsony military academy. His grandfather was Lieutenant-General Ernő Kiss, one of the 13 Martyrs of Arad who were executed in 1849. When the Austro-Hungarian Empire declared war against Serbia, Kiss promptly dropped out of school and enlisted in the 72nd Infantry Regiment of the Austro-Hungarian army despite the fact that his truncated education would keep him from the officer's ranks. On 26 October 1914 he went into action against the Russians in the Carpathian Mountains. He was severely wounded there, and sent home to convalesce. While on convalescent leave he became interested in the Austro-Hungarian air service. He applied, was accepted, and trained at Wiener-Neustadt.

He graduated as a sergeant pilot in April 1916, and was assigned to the newly founded Flik 24. He scored his first victory on 20 June 1916 while still flying a two-seater Hansa-Brandenburg C.I; he and observer Georg Kenzian forced down a Farman. While flying the two-seater Hansa-Brandenberg he forced down two three-engined Caproni bombers, one of which holed his plane 70 times. He was then upgraded to a single seated Hansa-Brandenburg D.I fighter. By November 1917 he had amassed seven victories, including four forced down and captured.

He was then transferred to Flik 55J flying the Albatros D.III. Kiss' personal aircraft was painted black with a large white 'K' on either side of the fuselage, and he would wield it with a courage bordering on recklessness. Comrades included fellow aces Julius Arigi and Josef von Maier, who formed the rest of his flight, and the three of them became known as the Kaiser Staffel (Emperor's Squadron). As Kiss's score mounted he was turned down for commissioning as an officer because of his humble family background and incomplete schooling.

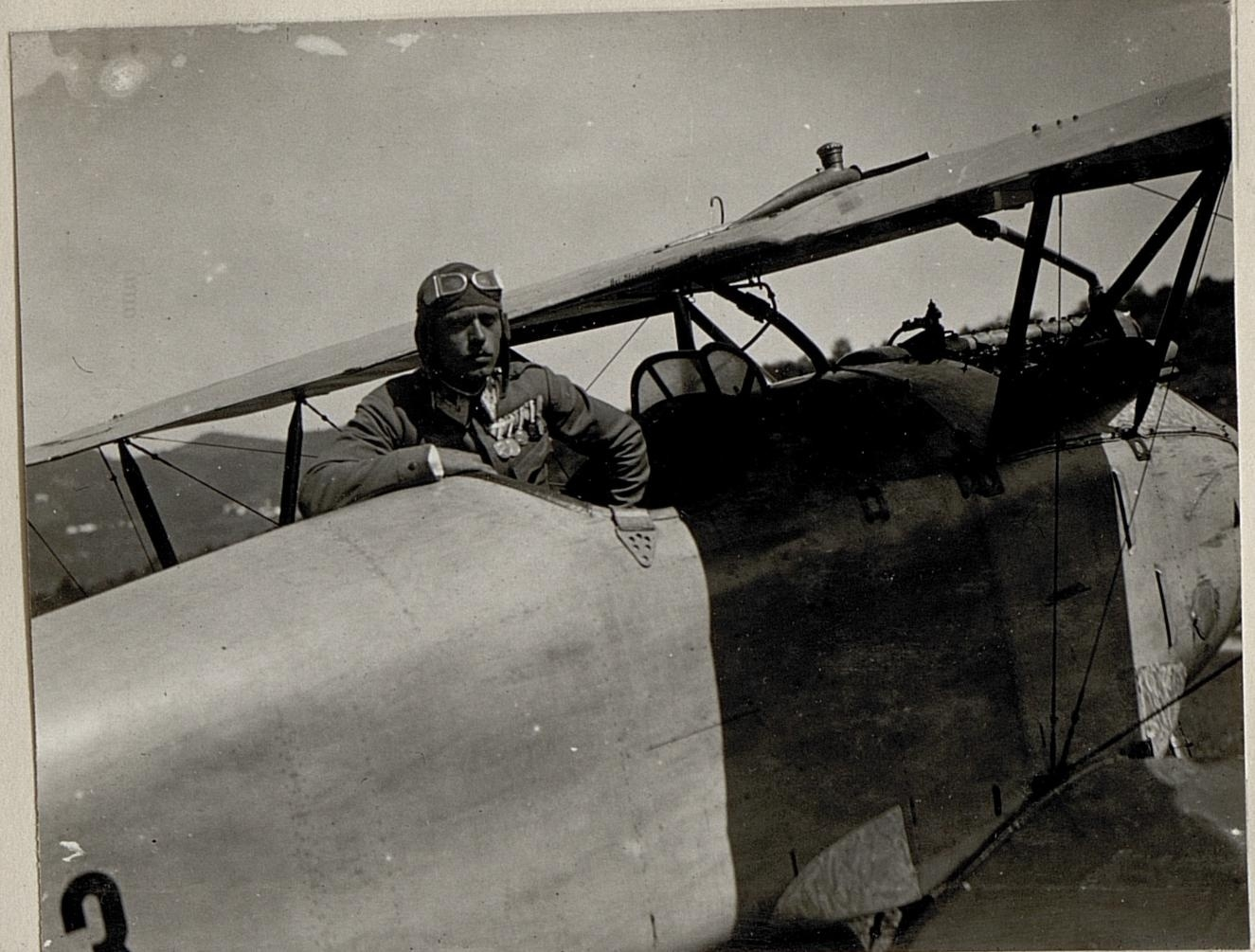
József Kiss, in his airplane, wearing his medals.

He was seriously wounded again in late January 1918 but returned to duty only two months after having some of his bowel surgically removed. His last victory was on 28 January 1918. He flew without any further triumphs until he was killed in action on 24 May 1918 by Lt.Gerald Birks of No 66 Squadron. His final score of 19 included at least seven enemy aircraft forced down and captured and 9 victories shared with other pilots

Kiss was posthumously promoted to Leutnant; he was the only noncommissioned officer in the Austro-Hungarian military to be so promoted. His funeral was held three days after his death, at the Italian airfield at Pergine Valsugana. A sizable flyover of opposing Allied planes, including British, French, and Italians, dropped a funeral wreath with a note attached. It read: "Our last salute to our courageous foe."

Kiss's girlfriend Enrica Bonecker never married, and she visited his grave daily for the next 52 years.
