= Stara Moravica =

Stara Moravica Стара Моравица (Serbian) Bácskossuthfalva (Hungarian)
- Village (Selo)
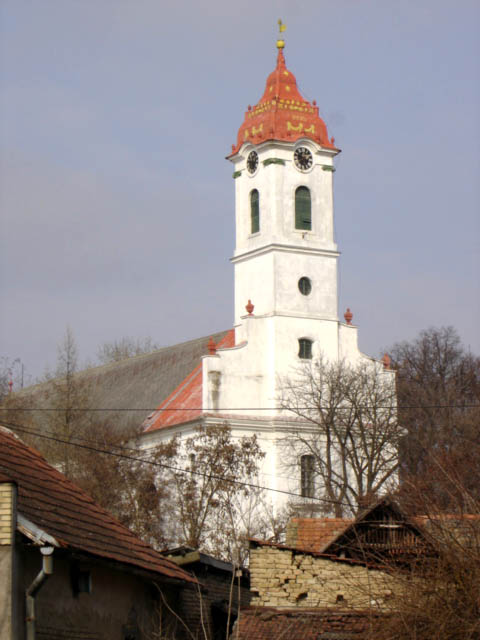
- The Calvinist church.

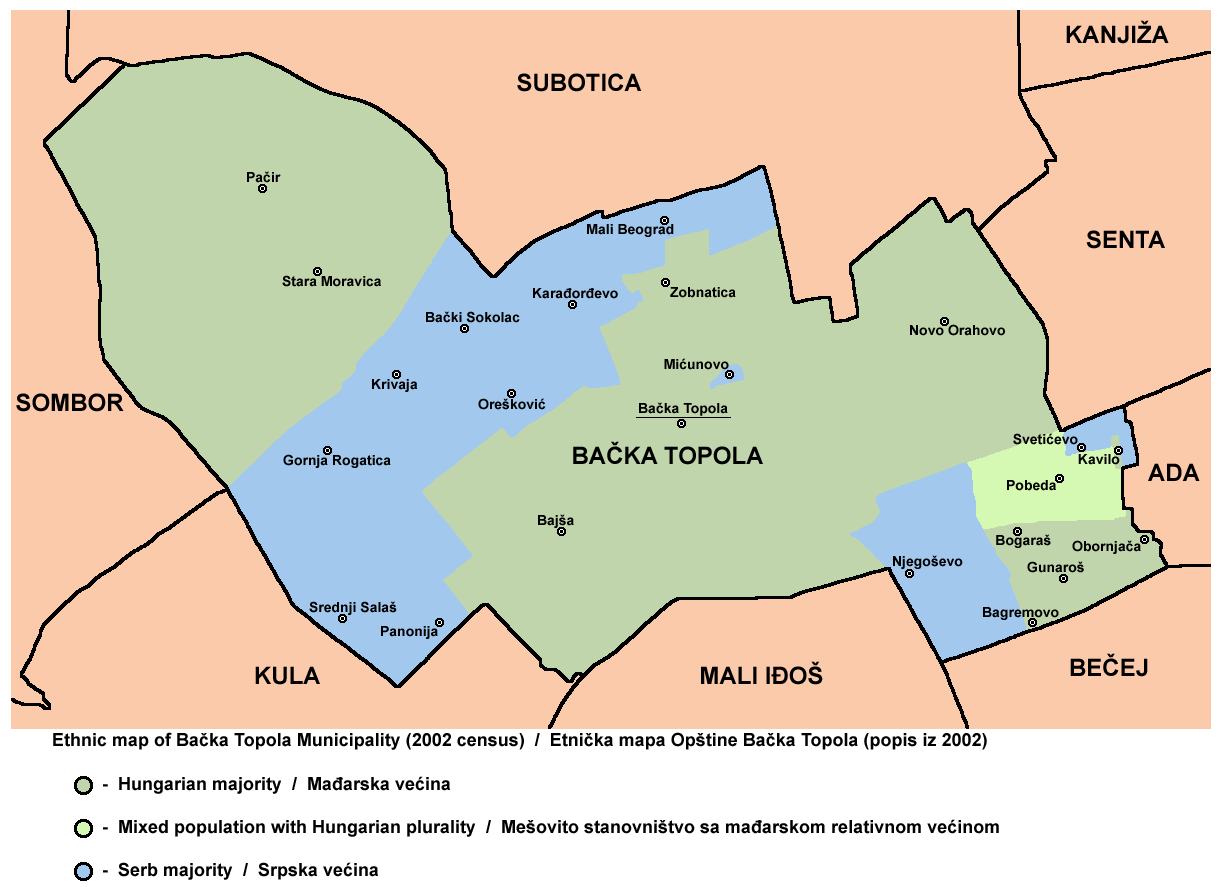
- Map of the Bačka Topola municipality showing the location of Stara Moravica

- Location within Vojvodina Location within Serbia Location within Europe
- Coordinates: 45°52′8″N 19°27′58″E
- Country: Serbia
- Province: Vojvodina
- District: North Bačka District
- Municipality: Bačka Topola

Area
  - Total: 34.1 sq mi (88.3 km^{2})

Population (2022)
  - Total: 3,909
- Time zone: UTC+1 (CET)
  - Summer (DST): UTC+2 (CEST)

Stara Moravica (Serbian Cyrillic: Стара Моравица; Hungarian: Bácskossuthfalva or Ómoravica; German: Alt-Morawitza) is a village located in the Bačka Topola municipality, in the North Bačka District of Serbia. It is situated in the Autonomous Province of Vojvodina. The village has a Hungarian ethnic majority and its population numbering 3,909 people.

== Etymology ==
Its name has changed many times throughout history: or 20 versions can be listed. The story begins with the settlements of the Avar period: Okor, Omar, then Omarica, Omaricsa, Omorovics, Omarocsa. The name Omorovica appeared in Turkish times. Similar versions were included until the turn of the century: Omorovicza, Bács-Omorovicza, Ómorovicza. From 1907 Kossuthfalva and from 1912 Bácskossuthfalva was the official name of the village.

== History ==
Between 1782 and 1786, Hungarians settled in Stara Moravica.

== Geography ==
It is situated halfway between Belgrade and Budapest in a geographical region of Bačka.

Map coordinates: 45°52′8″N 19°27′58″E.

=== Climate ===
Climate data for Stara Moravica
Month	Jan	Feb	Mar	Apr	May	Jun	Jul	Aug	Sep	Oct	Nov	Dec	Year
Mean daily maximum °F (°C)	36 (2)	40 (4)	51 (11)	60 (16)	70 (21)	75 (24)	79 (26)	79 (26)	73 (23)	61 (16)	46 (8)	38 (3)	59 (15)
Mean daily minimum °F (°C)	26 (−3)	28 (−2)	34 (2)	43 (6)	52 (11)	58 (14)	60 (16)	60 (16)	54 (12)	44 (7)	35 (2)	29 (−2)	44 (6.6)
Average precipitation inches (mm)	1.1 (28)	1.1 (28)	1.1 (28)	1.6 (41)	2.1 (53)	2.7 (69)	2.1 (53)	2.0 (50)	1.5 (38)	1.3 (33)	1.7 (43)	1.6 (41)	19.9 (505)

== Demographics ==
Historical population
Year	Pop.	±%
1931	8,034	—
1948	6,919	−13.9%
1953	6,682	−3.4%
1961	6,904	+3.3%
1971	6,737	−2.4%
1981	6,449	−4.3%
1991	6,266	−2.8%
2002	5,699	−9.0%
2011	5,013	−12.0%
2022	3,909	−22.0%

Ethnic structure (2022 census)
1. Hungarian (79.4%)
2. Serbian (8.50%)
3. Roma (2.00%)

The village has been declining in population since the 1960s. In 2022, there were 3,909 inhabitants, with 3,103 Hungarians, 334 Serbs, and 472 persons of other ethnicities or undeclared/unknown.

=== Religion ===
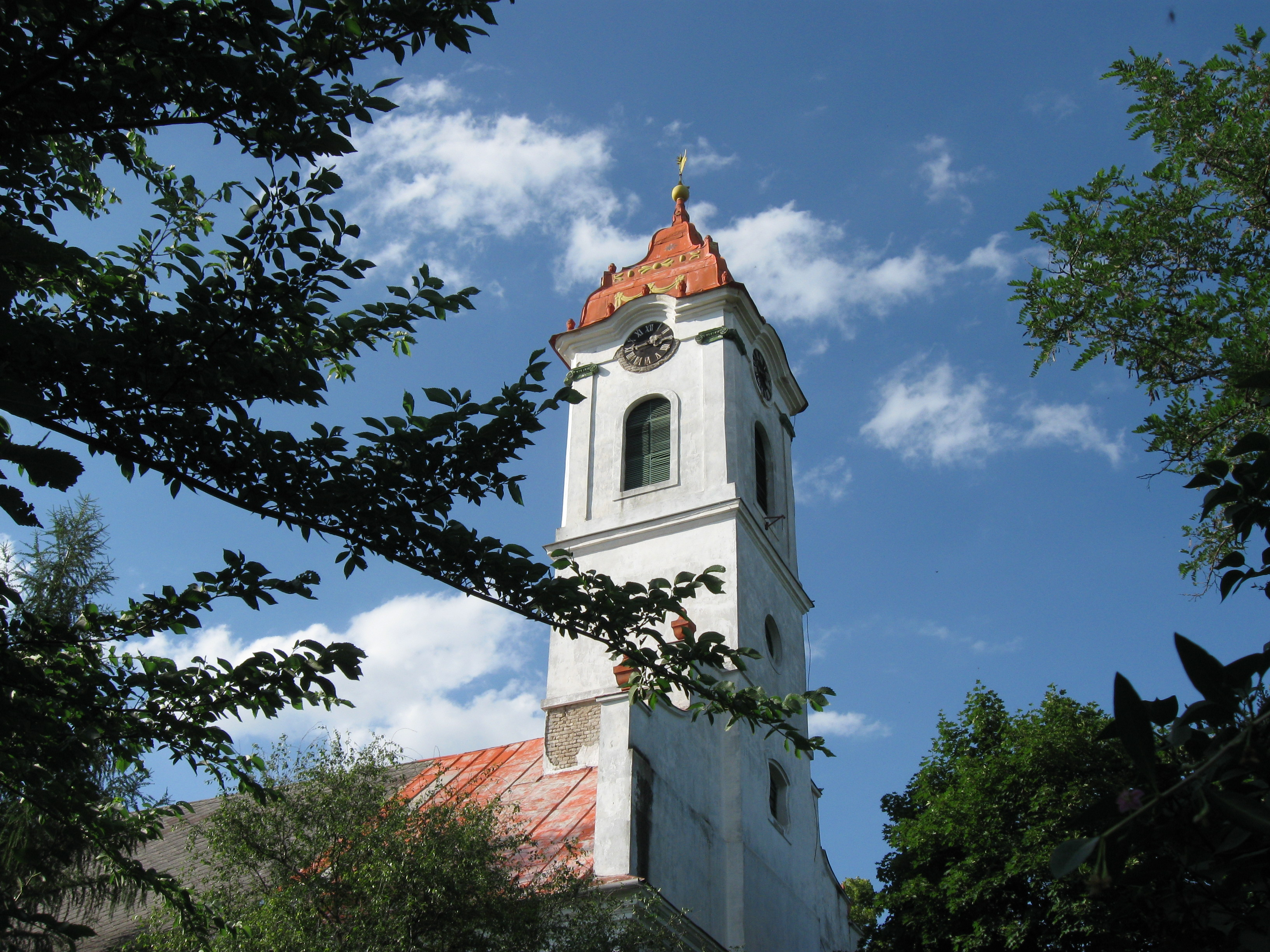
Calvinist church.

Stara Moravica has two churches: one Catholic and one Calvinist Protestant.

== Culture ==
The village celebrates several festivals throughout the year: the annual Village Fair in May, the Beer Festival in August, the Grape Picking Festival in September, the Fall Harvest Festival in October, the Honey Festival in November, and the Village Celebration in December.

There is an artist colony in Stara Moravica that attracts artists from all over the world for a few weeks. In addition, the village has one of the largest art collections in Vojvodina and has a Cultural House.

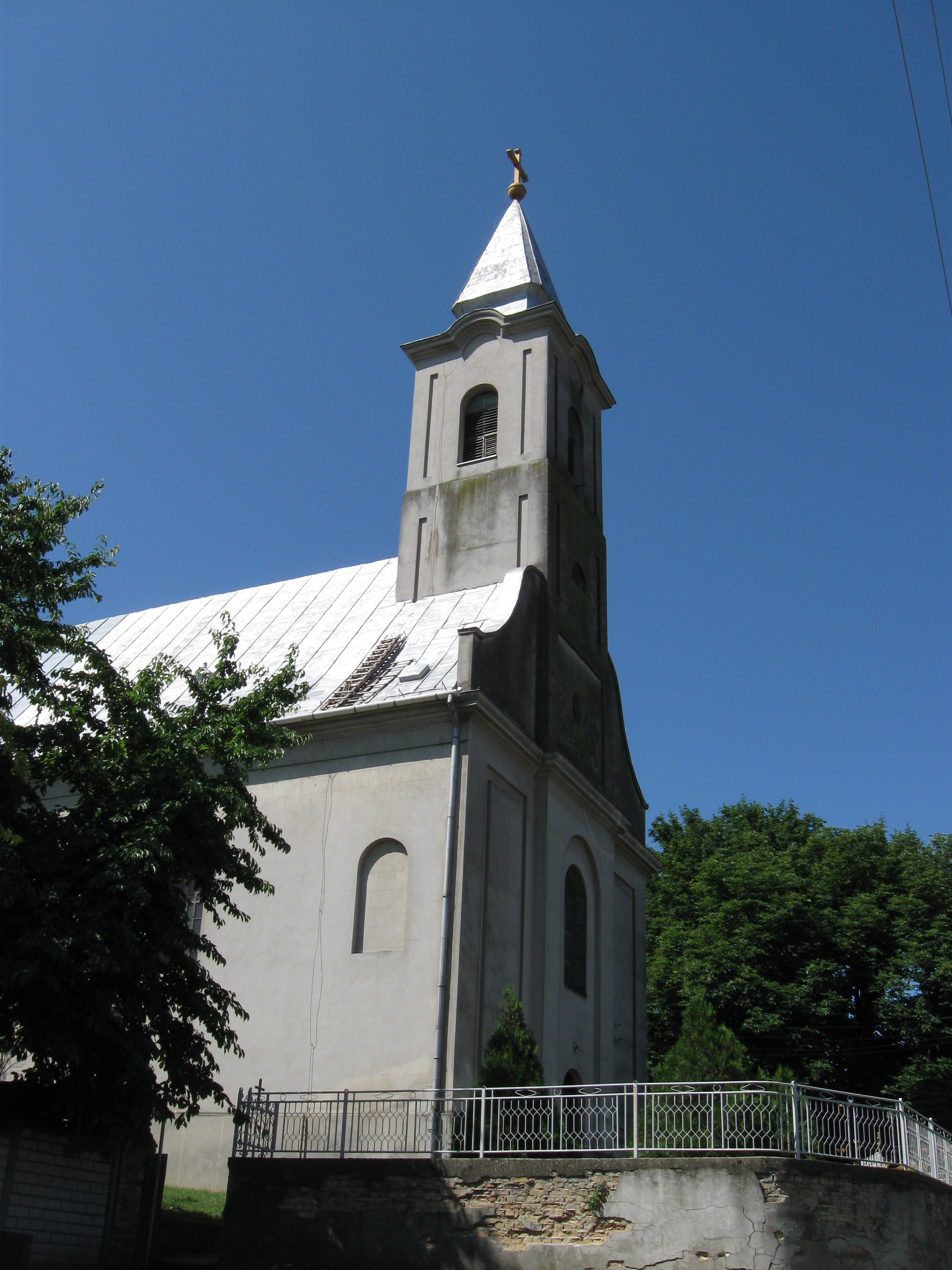
The Catholic church.

== In popular culture ==
Stara Moravica was featured on the HGTV series House Hunters International Renovation.

== See also ==
- List of places in Serbia
- List of cities, towns and villages in Vojvodina

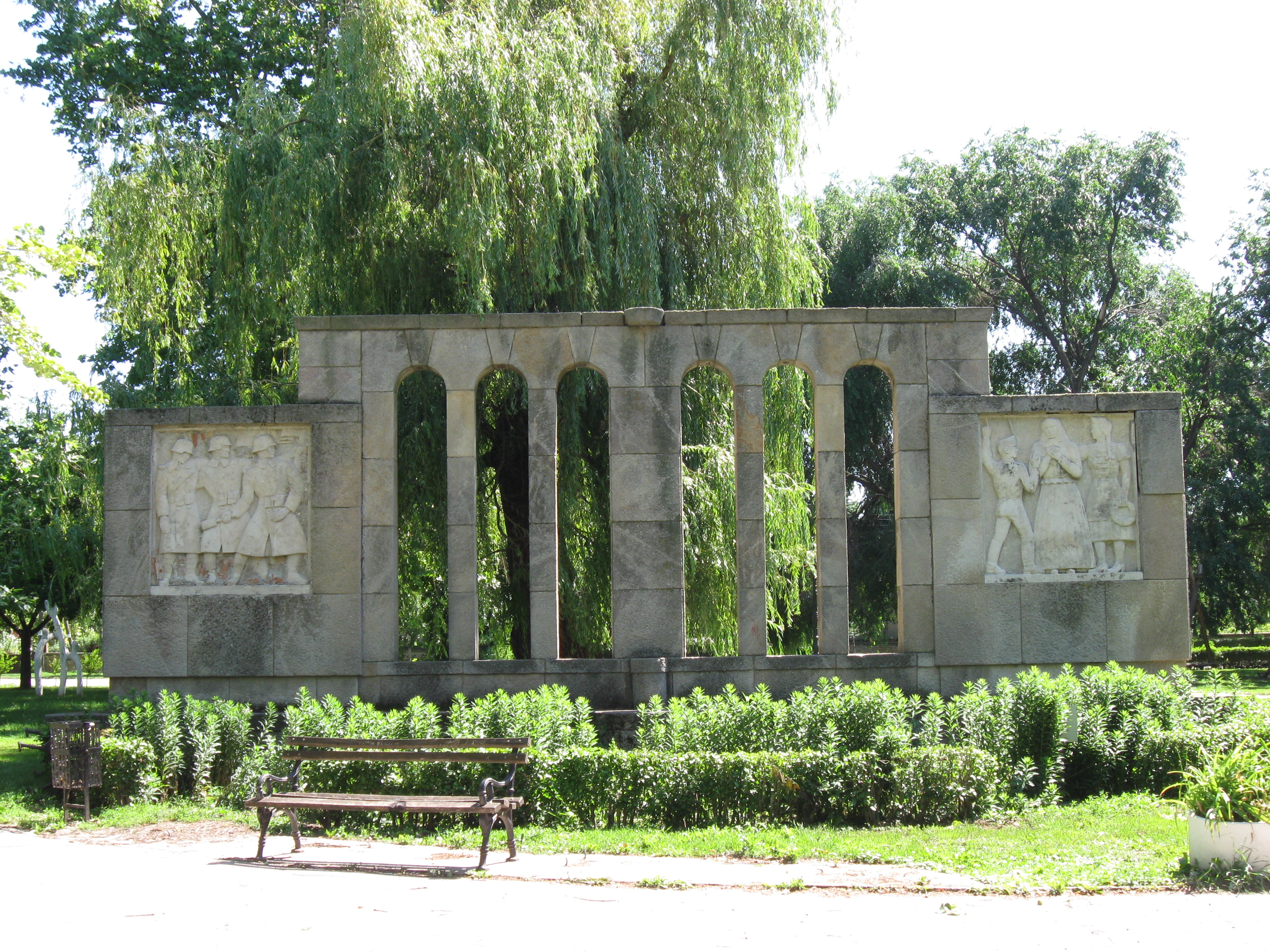
The Stara Moravica World War II memorial.
