= Julius Arigi =

Austro-Hungarian flying ace

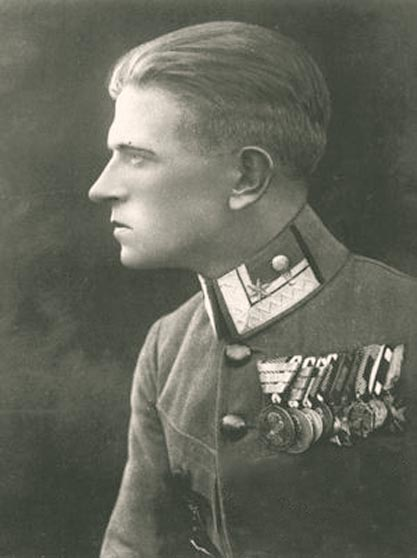
- Arigi as Offiziersstellvertreter in 1918
- Born: 3 October 1895; Tetschen, Bohemia, Austria-Hungary
- Died: 1 August 1981 (aged 85); Seewalchen am Attersee, Austria
- Military career
- Allegiance: Austro-Hungarian Empire
- Branch: Luftfahrtruppen
- Service years: 1913–18
- Rank: Stabsfeldwebel (Staff Sergeant)
- Units: Artillery Regiment 1, Fliegerkompanies 6, 41J, 55J, 1J
- Awards: Medal for Bravery (1 gold award, 4 silver)
- Other work: Fighter instructor for Luftwaffe (1938–45)

Julius Arigi (3 October 1895 – 1 August 1981) was a flying ace of the Austro-Hungarian Empire in World War I with a total of 32 credited victories. His victory total was second only to Godwin von Brumowski. Arigi was considered a superb natural pilot. He was also a technical innovator responsible for engineering changes in the aircraft he flew.

== Early life ==
Julius Arigi was born in Děčín (German: Tetschen), Bohemia, to a Sudeten German family. Before joining the military, he was a waiter or an electrician (sources are unclear in that case). He volunteered in October 1913 for Fortress Artillery Regiment No. 1 of the Austro-Hungarian Army.

== Aerial service ==
In March 1914, he transferred to the Luftfahrtruppen (air service). He trained as a pilot, passing final tests on 26 November 1914, to become Zugsführer (sergeant).

Initially during World War I, Arigi was assigned to Fliegerkompanie 6, based in southern Dalmatia, flying Lloyd Type LS 2 and Lohner biplane aircraft in operations against Serbian and Montenegrin forces. On 20 December 1914, Arigi and his observer, Leutnant Levak, crashlanded a Lohner 140 in the Adriatic Sea; fortunately for them, in the shallow water.

In October 1915, Arigi became a prisoner of war when he was forced down due to engine failure during a reconnaissance flight behind enemy lines in Montenegro. He escaped captivity on his sixth try in January 1916, however, by stealing an enemy staff car belonging to Prince Nicholas of Montenegro, and rejoining his unit which later moved to Albania.

While flying on the Albanian front, Arigi sank an Italian steamboat in the port of Valona (now Vlorë).

On 22 August 1916, Stabsfeldwebel (Sergeant Major) Arigi ignored standing orders that an officer had to be aboard to command his plane. He took Feldwebel (Staff Sergeant) Johann Lasi along to engage six Italian Farman aircraft over the Skumbi estuary in a Hansa-Brandenburg C.I aircraft. They shot five of the Farmans down, and Arigi became an ace in this one sortie.

Towards the end of 1916, he was transferred to the Isonzo front in Italy. There he mostly flew escort missions in a Hansa-Brandenburg D.I single-seat fighter. By May, 1917, his victory total was up to 12. He was unhappy with the tail assembly of this aircraft because he felt it lacked directional stability. He redesigned the horn-balanced rudder with a low aspect fin and a plain rudder. His redesign was later copied from his plane and became standard on the D1. He was awarded 500 kronen for his innovation.

He then spent a short time in Fliegerkompanie 41J, but clashed with its commanding officer, Hauptmann Godwin Brumowski. In August, he was transferred to newly formed Fliegerkompanie 55J at Haidenschaft. He would score 13 victories while with Flik 55J, running his total to 25. Ten of those victories were scored as he cooperated with two other Austro-Hungarian aces, Hauptmann (Captain) Josef von Maier and Lieutenant (Second Lieutenant) József Kiss.

In April, 1918, he was transferred back to Flik 6 on the Albanian front. In his short stay there, he scored 3 more kills while flying an Avatik D1. In summer, 1918, he was again transferred, to Flik 1J at Igalo in Dalmatia, and while there partook in the defence of the Austro-Hungarian Naval base in the Bocche di Cattaro from the British air raids by the Adriatic Group, Royal Air Force. In August 1918 Flik 1J was equipped with two new Avatik D1 fighters, which he used to score his final four victories.

His combat career extended over four years; his last victory was scored on 23 August 1918. He spent the last days of the war as a factory test pilot.

Although Arigi had not served on World War I's premier front (i.e. the Western one) for fighter aviation, his service was especially notable. He had flown mediocre aircraft in fronts notorious for changeable weather; mountainous terrain and over-water flights complicated matters. He had declined a personal offer from his emperor to work as a clerk in Vienna, with an accompanying promotion as a commissioned officer, to remain at the front.

== Post World War I ==
After the war he became a citizen of newly established Czechoslovakia where he in 1919 co-founded Ikarus, one of country's pioneer civil aviation companies; two years later founded another company, air travel named Weltbäderflugverkehr ("World Spa Air Transport"), which operated on the line between the capital Prague and famous spa towns of Mariánské Lázně and Karlovy Vary etc. in western Bohemia. Also while in Czechoslovakia, he helped select sites for new airfields. Later, when he became an ardent National Socialist and joined (1928) the German National Socialist Workers' Party (Czechoslovakia), was involved in espionage for the Third Reich. In 1934 he moved to Berlin and two years later he obtained Austrian citizenship.

In 1935, he partnered with a friend from World War I, fellow ace Benno Fiala von Fernbrugg, in forming the Wiener-Neustadt Airport Management Association.

From 1938, he was a Luftwaffe fighter instructor with the rank of captain. Two of his students became some of the most successful aces of World War II: Walter Nowotny (258 victories) and Hans-Joachim Marseille (158 victories). Their ability to repeatedly shoot down multiple enemies on the same sortie can be traced to Arigi's teaching them to close to minimum range before firing. Arigi later noted that while both students were quietly eager, Nowotny was naturally talented but Marseille had to work for mastery.

Arigi died in his sleep of natural causes in Seewalchen am Attersee, Austria on 1 August 1981.
