= Franz Rudorfer =

Austro-Hungarian World War I flying ace

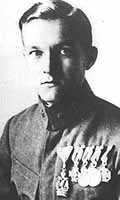
- Franz Rudorfer.jpg
- Born: 29 August 1897; Vienna, Austria
- Died: 13 November 1919 (aged 22); Turin, Italy
- Military career
- Allegiance: Austro-Hungarian Empire
- Branch: Infantry; aviation
- Service years: 1914–1919
- Rank: Oberleutnant
- Units: Flik 19D, Flik 51J
- Awards: Order of the Iron Crown, Military Merit Cross
- Other work: Pioneered European civil aviation

Oberleutnant Franz Rudorfer (1897-1919) was an Austro-Hungarian World War I flying ace credited with eleven confirmed and two unconfirmed aerial victories.

== Early life ==
Franz Rudorfer was born on 29 August 1897 in Vienna, Austria, when it was still part of the Austro-Hungarian Empire.

== World War I ==
Rudorfer had volunteered for service before World War I began. He was posted to Infanterieregiment No. 59 as a new leutnant in August 1916. In May 1917, he requested transfer to aviation. His first posting after observer training at Wiener-Neustadt was Flik 19J on the Italian front, under the command of Adolf Heyrowsky. Here he scored his first victory, becoming a balloon buster on 15 November 1917. It was also during his Flik 19J assignment that Rudorfer began to teach himself to fly. He would become a pilot without undergoing formal training.

In April 1918, he was posted to Flik 51J to fly Albatros D.III fighters. Between 17 April and 27 October 1918, he reeled off confirmed victories over eight enemy airplanes and two more observation balloons, along with two unconfirmed. During the crucial Battle of Vittorio Veneto, Rudorfer was one of the few Austro-Hungarians flying, bringing down a balloon on 24 October, and a couple of Sopwith Camels on the 27th. He would score no more victories before the war ended on 11 November 1918.

== Postwar career ==
On 30 December 1918, Franz Rudorfer received Austrian Pilot's Certificate No. 2647.

In December 1918, as a volunteer, he joined the ranks of the Ukrainian Galician Army, the military force of the West Ukrainian People's Republic, where he continued as a fighter pilot in the 1st Air Company and took part in the fighting of the Polish-Ukrainian War. Here he clashed with former Austro-Hungarian pilots who participated in the war on the Polish side. After the successful Polish offensive, which captured Lviv in May 1919, and the rapid advance of the Polish army further east, Rudorfer together with another pilot Ivan Zharsky deserted with their planes and landed at the airport in Košice in then Czechoslovakia on 25 May 1919. They were arrested by the local authorities but released soon afterwards. After this incident Rudorfer returned to Vienna.

Franz Rudorfer died in a plane crash near Turin in Italy on 13 November 1919.

== Notes ==
- Flik = Fliegerkompanie, a basic Air Force unit of Squadron size though was often understaffed numbering on average 8 pilots.
- Flik with'J' = 'J' denoted Jagdfliegerkompanie which was composed of dedicated Fighter aircraft.
- Flik with 'F' = 'F' Fernaufklärerkompanie was the designation for a Long Range Reconnaissance unit such as Flik 47F.
