= Alexander Kasza =

Austro-Hungarian World War I flying ace

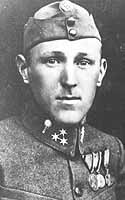
- Sándor Kasza Official photo
- Born: 1896; Bácskossuthfalva, Hungary, Austro-Hungarian Empire
- Died: February 1945 (aged 48–49); Budapest, Hungary
- Military career
- Allegiance: Austro-Hungarian Empire
- Branch: Aviation
- Rank: Feldwebel
- Units: 86th Infantry Regiment; Flik 55J; Flik15F, Flik11F
- Awards: 2 awards of Silver Medal for Bravery, Karl Troop Cross

Feldwebel Alexander Kasza (1896 – February 1945) was an Austro-Hungarian World War I flying ace credited with six aerial victories.

== Early life ==
Alexander Kasza was born in 1896 in Bácskossuthfalva, Hungary, Austro-Hungarian Empire. (Note: The town is now located in Serbia.)

== Military service ==
After joining the military in 1915, Kasza first served in the 86th Infantry Regiment before transferring to the Air Service. While rendering service in the Balloon Section in 1915, he finished a pilot's training course. He was so talented the school kept him on as an instructor.

Kasza would not see action until he was assigned to Flik 55J on the Isonzo Front as a fighter pilot in late 1917. At various times, he used both an Albatros D.III and a Phönix D.II fighter. The latter aircraft had three white bands encircling its fuselage marking his position in his flight, as well as a Maltese cross on its rudder. His personal insignia was a red heart, which was painted on center of its top wing and on the rear of the fuselage.

He gained his first victory on 15 November 1917 and ended his string of six victories on 9 June 1918.

In July 1918, he transferred to Flik 15F. The next month, he transferred to a reconnaissance pilot role in Flik 11F; he finished the war with that unit.

== Between the World Wars ==
Kasza was active in aviation circles in Hungary. He also became a member of the Order of Vitéz.

== World War II ==
In February 1945, a Soviet bomb meant for nearby Nazi troops in Budapest neighborhood fell instead on the home of Kasza and his family. They were all killed.

== Bibliography ==
- Franks, Norman; Guest, Russell; Alegi, Gregory (2008). Above The War Fronts: A Complete Record of the British Two-seater Bomber Pilot and Observer Aces, the British Two-seater Fighter Observer Aces, and the Belgian, Italian, Austro-Hungarian and Russian Fighter Aces, 1914-1918. Grub Street Publishing. ISBN 1898697566, 978-1898697565.
- O'Connor (1986). Air Aces of the Austro-Hungarian Empire, 1914-1918. Flying Machines Press. ISBN 978-1891268069.
