= Malert =

Defunct Hungarian airline (1922-1944)

MALÉRT
IATA	ICAO	Call sign
-	-	-
- Founded: November 19, 1922
- Ceased operations: 1944
- Fleet size: 16
- Destinations: 6
- Headquarters: Budapest, Hungary

MALÉRT (Magyar Légiforgalmi R.T.) was a Hungarian airline. It was founded in 1922 and ceased operations permanently in 1944 during World War II.

== History ==
The airline was founded on November 19, 1922. By 1929, the airline flew regular flights connecting Budapest with Belgrade and Vienna. The main fleet before 1939 was eight triple-engined German-built Junkers Ju 52/3m aircraft HA-JUA to HA-JUG, one airplane HA-DUR for the government, delivered between 1933 and 1939. Five somewhat comparable triple-engined Italian-built Savoia Marchetti S.M.75 aircraft HA-SMA to HA-SME, delivered in 1938–39. And also 3 German-built Focke-Wulf Fw 58 airplanes, with the codes HA-FOA to HA-FOD. Mainstream services operated in 1938-9 were daily Budapest-Kraków-Warsaw, daily Budapest-Prague and daily Budapest-Vienna. The airline merged with Aeroflot in 1944-46 into Maszovlet (Magyar-Szovjet Légiforgalmi Társaság) a forerunner of Malév Hungarian Airlines.

== Destinations ==
The airline operated flights between Budapest, Kraków, Warsaw, Prague, Belgrade and Vienna.

== Fleet ==
The MALÉRT fleet consisted of the following aircraft:

- 3 Focke-Wulf Fw 58
- 8 Junkers Ju 52/3m
- 5 Savoia-Marchetti SM.75
