= Eugen Bönsch =

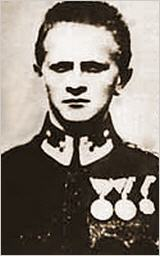
- Born: 1 May 1897; Velká Úpa, Austria-Hungary
- Died: 24 July 1951 (aged 54); Ehrwald, Austria
- Military career
- Allegiance: Austro-Hungarian Empire; Germany
- Branch: Aviation
- Rank: Feldwebel (later Hauptmann)
- Units: Flek 8, Flek 6, Flik 51J
- Awards: 3 Gold Awards of the Medal for Bravery
- Other work: Hauptmann (captain) in Luftwaffe during World War II

Feldwebel Eugen Bönsch (1 May 1897 – 24 July 1951) was a World War I flying ace credited with 16 aerial victories.

== Early life and service ==
Bönsch studied mechanics at the State Trade School. He originally joined the army in 1915, but after completing basic training transferred to aviation. His original assignment was as a mechanic with Fliegerersatzkompagnie 6.

== Flying service ==
He requested flight training in 1917. He completed it at Flek 8 on 22 June 1917. His promotion to corporal followed six days later. In August, he was assigned to Flik 51 on the Italian front; he scored his first victory shortly thereafter, on 1 September,{ He became a balloon buster with his next triumph, on 28 September; it took several firing passes at 700 meters altitude through heavy ground fire, dodging a couple of enemy fighters, to down the balloon. In the next thirteen months, his victory skein would include five more balloons, making him the Austro-Hungarian's leading balloon killer. He received his first Medal for Bravery for this victory. He also downed a Nieuport the following day.

Bönsch began the new year of 1918 by surviving being shot down by anti-aircraft fire. He also added other dimensions to his flying repertoire. On 10 March, he led such a determined assault on an escorted of Italian Capronis that the bombers aborted the mission. The next day, Bönsch began a week of low-level raids on the Italian airfields at Marcon and Treviso, and the port of Portegrandi. The next few months, from April through October, Bönsch carried out a hectic double load of air-to-air combat intermixed with ground attack strikes, including at the Battle of the Piave.

On 29 October 1918, he became one of the few World War I pilots to survive being set afire; he parachuted to safety. He made his way back to his home airfield from enemy territory and returned to battle. By 24 October, the Battle of Vittorio Veneto had worn the local Austro-Hungarian air force down to only 29 planes. Bönsch was one of the remaining pilots, and scored two victories on the 27th, and one each on the 28th and 29th.

== Post World War I ==
After the war, he was an innkeeper. When World War II began, he returned to duty and was appointed Hauptmann because of his prior experience. He then served at Oschatz Air Base in Saxony.
