= Benno Fiala Ritter von Fernbrugg =

Austro-Hungarian fighter ace

Benno Fiala von Fernbrugg
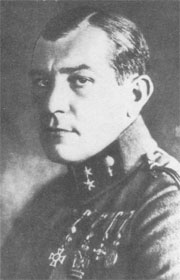
- Born: 16 June 1890; Vienna, Austria
- Died: 29 October 1964 (aged 74); Vienna, Austria
- Military career
- Allegiance: Austria-Hungary
- Branch: Artillery, aviation
- Service years: ca 1914–1918, unknown period during World War II
- Rank: Hauptmann (Captain)
- Units: Fort Artillery Regiment 1, Fliegerkompagnies 1, 19, 41J, 12D, 56J.

Hauptmann (Captain) Benno Fiala Ritter von Fernbrugg (16 June 1890 – 29 October 1964) was an Austro-Hungarian fighter ace with 28 victories to his credit during World War I. He was the third ranking ace of the Austro-Hungarian Empire. His honours and decorations included the Order of the Iron Crown, Order of Leopold, Military Merit Cross, Military Merit Medal, Gold Medal for Bravery (Austria-Hungary) and the Iron Cross. He was also a technical innovator who pioneered the use of machine guns, radios, and cameras in airplanes. His forty-year aviation career also included aircraft manufacture, airport management, and the establishment of commercial airlines.

== Early life ==
Benno Fiala von Fernbrugg was born in Vienna to an aristocratic family with a tradition of military service. His father was an artillery officer and his brother in naval aviation. Fiala attended primary and secondary school in Vienna, and went on to major in mechanical engineering at the local University of Technology, becoming an Ingenieur.

He had an early fascination with aviation but was initially refused aviation service, instead being gazetted as an officer in the engineers and assigned to Fort Artillery Regiment 1 in 1910.

== Assignment to Aviation ==
Being assigned to the artillery didn't quash his interest in aviation; his brother was a naval aviator, and Fiala visited airports. While at one, he met Emil Uzelac, Commander of the fledgling air force of the Austro-Hungarian Empire. Uzelac arranged Fiala's transfer to Fliegerkompagnie 1 of the Luftfahrtruppen as a technical officer. Fiala completed training as a flying observer on 28 July 1914, the very day Austria-Hungary declared war on Serbia.

In November 1914, Fiala took charge of the locomotive of a supply train and drove it to safety even though it was under attack by Russian troops and he was wounded in the action. He was awarded the Silver Military Merit Medal for this. On 10 November, he also received a most unusual promotion to leutnant (Second Lieutenant) ahead of his sequence in seniority.

Although trained as an observer, Fiala's duties in this beginning of the war consisted mainly of arming planes with machine guns, and experimenting with aerial cameras. He also rigged a 30 kilogram (66 pound) radio transmitter in an unarmed plane. It was used in May 1915 on the Russian Front, during the Battle of Gorlice-Tarnow: by sending corrections to a receiver on the ground, it successfully adjusted mortar fire. Fiala was briefly attached to the testing section of the air arsenal before being reassigned to a flying unit.

== Aerial Victories ==
Fiala had had a couple of unconfirmed victories on the Russian Front. Now he was transferred to Fliegerkompany 19 on the Italian Front in January 1916. There he flew a Hansa-Brandenburg C.I two seated reconnaissance plane, scoring his first confirmed triumph on 29 April 1916.

On 4 May 1916, he was flying as an observer in a Hansa-Brandenburg C.I flown by Adolf Heyrowsky when they teamed with a second C.I to shoot down the Italian airship M-4. The semi-rigid dirigible had been returning from a bombing raid when Fiala shot it down above Gorizia, Italy, killing the entire crew of six.

Fiala was wounded by anti-aircraft fire in the beginning of 1917. It was during this recuperation that he decided to apply for pilot's training. After he recovered, he moved into Fliegerkorps 41J, then into a Hansa-Brandenburg D.I fighter in Fliegerkorps 12D.

Beginning 9 August 1917, he ran off a string of five confirmed and two confirmed wins for the month. He scored once more, in October, before changing squadrons once again in November, to move into an Albatros D.III with Fliegerkorps 56J.

He notched win number nine with 56J, but didn't spend long with them; he transferred into command of Fliegerkorps 51J in January, 1918. His steady accretion of victories helped shape Flik 51J into the premier squadron of the Austro-Hungarians. Especially notable was his 14th win; on 30 May 1918, he downed British ace Alan Jerrard in an action that was so fierce, it won the loser the Victoria Cross.

Fiala racked up number 28 on 20 August 1918. He continued to fly until October, but then was posted to nonflying staff duties until war's end.

The engineer turned fighter pilot had flown on two fronts which had more hazardous flying conditions and less opportunity for air combat than the Western Front in France. His victory roll included a dirigible, three observation balloons, and a predominance of enemy fighters among the planes he had felled. He claimed at least five unconfirmed victories. He had won the Order of the Iron Crown, Order of Leopold, Military Merit Cross, Military Merit Medal, Gold Medal for Bravery, and the Iron Cross.

== Postwar ==
Fiala returned to college after the war, completing an engineering degree from the University of Vienna in 1923. From 1925 through 1927, he worked with Professor Hugo Junkers of Junkers fame on aircraft maintenance for civil airliners. In 1928, he entered into a partnership with Mitsubishi of Japan to produce an all-metal plane for the United States market.

In March 1933 he was placed under house arrest by the Gestapo by direct order of Hermann Göring. After his release, he fled Germany back to his native Austria. He then joined his old comrade in arms Julius Arigi in founding an airport operations company. He was an executive of this company through 1936. During World War II, he served in the Luftwaffe as a Captain, or Hauptmann. Later, he ran the airport in Horsching, Austria.

He died in Vienna on 29 October 1964 and was buried in the Fiala-Fernbrugg family vault in Vienna's Central Cemetery. The Austrian air force base at Aigen im Ennstal is named for him.

== Awards and decorations ==
- Knight's Cross of the Order of Leopold with war decoration and swords (Austria)
- Order of the Iron Crown, 3rd class with war decoration and swords (Austria)
- Gold Medal for Bravery (Austria-Hungary)
- Silver and Bronze Military Merit Medals (Austria-Hungary)
- Military Merit Cross, 3rd class (Austria-Hungary)
- Iron Cross of 1914, 2nd class
