= Adolf Heyrowsky =

Austro-Hungarian flying ace

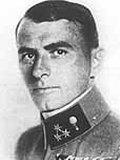
- Heyrowsky in dress uniform
- Born: 18 February 1882; Murau, Austria-Hungary (now Austria)
- Died: 1945 (aged 62–63); Unknown
- Burial place: Unknown
- Relatives: Unknown
- Military career
- Allegiance: Austria-Hungary
- Branch: Aviation
- Service years: 1902–1945
- Rank: Oberst
- Unit: Flik 2
- Commands: Flik 9, Flik 19
- Conflicts: World War I: Battle of Isonzo; World War II
- Awards: Order of the Iron Crown, 3rd class Order of the Iron Cross; Military Merit Cross; Silver and Bronze Military Merit Medals Karl Troop Cross
- Other work: Died just before promotion to Generalmajor during World War II

Oberst Adolf Heyrowsky (18 February 1882 – 1945), was a career officer in the Austro-Hungarian military who turned to aviation. He became an accredited flying ace during World War I, with twelve aerial victories scored despite the fact he was a reconnaissance pilot instead of flying fighters. The units he flew in and commanded had long range recon and ground attacks as their primary mission.

== Early career ==
Adolf Heyrowsky was born on 18 February 1882 in Murau, Styria, Austria. He was a gamekeeper's son.

Heyrowsky graduated from Prague's Infantry Military Academy in 1902. He enlisted in Infanterieregiment 9 and became an Offiziersstellvertreter. He was promoted to Leutnant in May 1904, and on to Oberleutnant six years later. In 1912, Heyrowski volunteered for aviation; in August of that year, he qualified as a pilot. By the time World War I broke out, Heyrowsky had a respectable military career in progress. He was mechanically minded with excellent training in aeronautics. Off duty, his sporting interests included riding horseback, driving an automobile, skiing, swimming, and fencing. He opened his war serving with Flik 2 against the Serbs.

== World War I ==
=== Aerial service ===
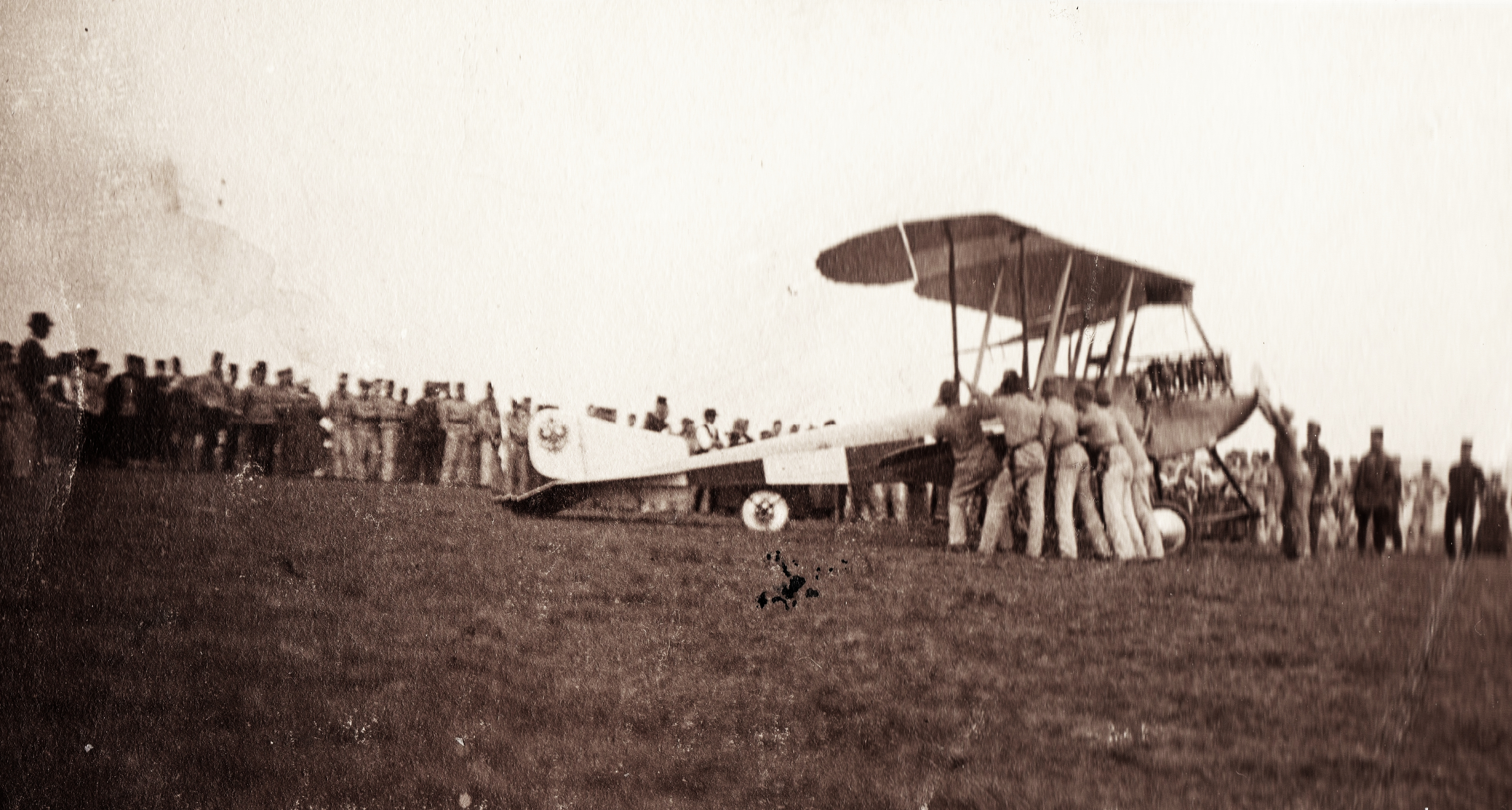
A 1912 Lohner Type B Pfeilflieger.

Despite the limitations of outdated Lohner Type B Pfeilflieger biplanes, Heyrowsky carried out daring deep reconnaissance missions that penetrated as far as 125 miles (200 km) into enemy terrain. On 13 September 1914, Heyrowsky attacked a Serbian pontoon bridge across the Save River. Holding the aircraft controls between his knees, he lit the fuses on his bombs and hurled them overboard at 600 feet altitude. He blew away the center span; subsequently, the Serbian division dependent on the bridge was badly beaten. Heyrowsky was awarded the Bronze Military Merit Medal for this action.

On 1 January 1915, Heyrowsky was also honored by being promoted to Hauptmann ahead of his contemporaries. He also received the Order of the Iron Crown Third Class with War Decorations. On 22 February and 3 March 1915, he played balloon buster over Belgrade for Flik 9, destroying an observation balloon on both dates.

=== Heyrowsky in command ===
In August 1915, Heyrowsky was appointed to command Flik 12; he held that post for the rest of the year.

His third win came after he took command of a newly formed unit, Flik 19. Composed of a cast of experienced pilots, the new squadron would become the finest reconnaissance squadron in Austro-Hungarian aviation. Although chiefly stocked with Albatros and Hansa-Brandenburg two-seaters, Flik 19 also had single-seat fighters in its inventory.

Flying with Benno Fiala Ritter von Fernbrugg as his observer, Heyrowsky shot down the Italian airship M4 in flames on 4 May 1916 with 53 incendiary bullets. Even as Heyrowsky was reopening his victory list, he was also volunteering to serve as an infantry officer in the ongoing Battle of Isonzo in his time off from flying. His leadership of his assigned company was responsible for its blocking an Italian offensive in the Sixth Battle of the Isonzo.

During August, he was forced to land on two consecutive days, even as he picked up two more wins and became an ace. In one of those August combats, he shot it out with nine Italian opponents for 45 minutes while on a reconnaissance mission.

Beginning in March 1917, Flik 19 was assigned to ground attack duties supporting the Austro-Hungarian 14th Infantry Division. In April, Heyrowsky settled on Hansa-Brandenburg C.I serial number 29.64 as his personal plane; he would fly none other through September 1917. During this time, Heyrowsky would continue to score; on 26 June 1917, he shot down two enemy aircraft.

He was shot down again in October, during the Battle of Caporetto. Despite crashlanding in the midst of the fighting and well behind Italian lines, Heyrowsky and his observer managed to evade capture in a two-day hike back to their own lines. Upon his return, he was removed from combat duty for staff work. He began as staff officer for aviation for the Second Army, and moved up to become the air liaison officer to Generalleutnant Ernst Wilhelm von Hoeppner in March 1918. He also received the rarely awarded Knight's Cross of the Order of Leopold with War Decorations and Swords.

While on Hoeppner's staff, Heyrowsky managed to fly with German aviation, taking place in bombing raids on Amiens, Paris, Nancy, and Dover. When the Austro-Hungarians launched their last great offensive in the Battle of the Piave, Heyrowsky returned to the Italian Front. He coordinated actions between the Austro-Hungarian aviation and ground troops until the battle's end on 25 June 1918. He then returned to Germany until war's end.

== World War II ==
Heyrowsky served in the Luftwaffe as an Oberst during World War II. He died in 1945, on the brink of promotion to Generalmajor. He was 63 years old.

== Sources ==
Bibliography

- Chant, Christopher (2002). Austro-Hungarian Aces of World War 1. Osprey Publishing. ISBN 978-1-84176-376-7.
- Franks, Norman; Guest, Russell; Alegi, Gregory (1997). Above the War Fronts: The British Two-seater Bomber Pilot and Observer Aces, the British Two-seater Fighter Observer Aces, and the Belgian, Italian, Austro-Hungarian and Russian Fighter Aces, 1914–1918. Grub Street. ISBN 978-1898697565.
- O'Connor, Martin (1994). Air Aces of the Austro-Hungarian Empire 1914 - 1918. Flying Machines Press. ISBN 978-0-9637110-1-4.
