= Air observer =

Aircrew reconnaissance role

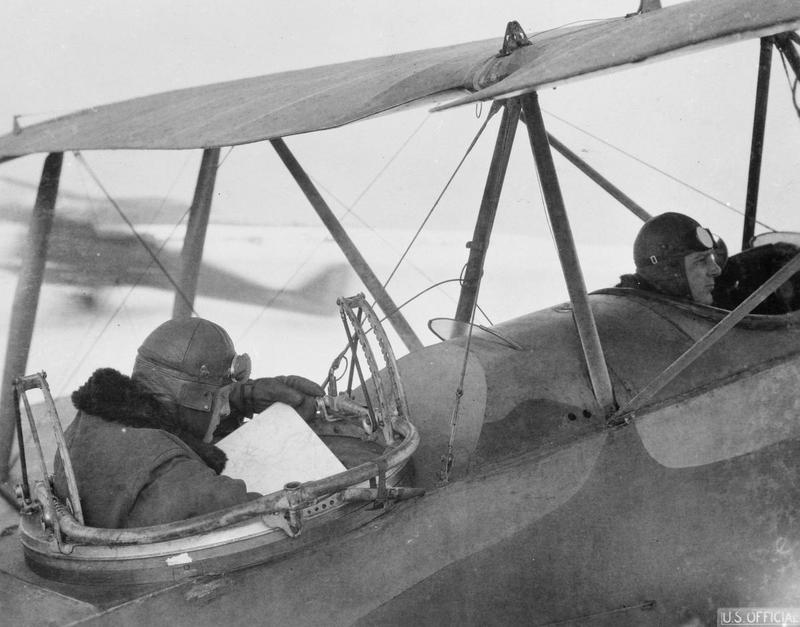
A pilot (right) and air observer (left) in a Sopwith 1½ Strutter, c. 1918–1919

An air observer or aerial observer is an aircrew member whose duties are predominantly reconnaissance. The term originated in the British military during World War I.

== History ==
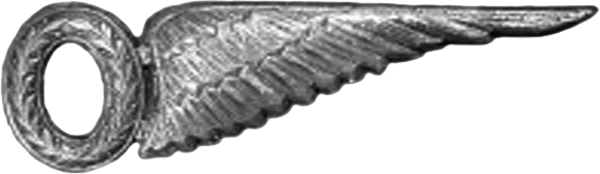
First World War observer badge, United States

The term "air observer" originated in the First World War in the British Royal Flying Corps, and was maintained by its successor, the Royal Air Force (RAF). An air observer's brevet was a single wing with an O at the root.

Observers were also issued with weapons, and expected to engage with enemy aircraft in the early days of military aviation. Over time, the role changed and separate gunnery specialities emerged. By the Second World War, the RAF commonly used the designation "air observer/navigator" in bomber crew. Air observers were trained at the Air Observer Schools.

The first recorded RAF "kill" of the Second World War, on 20 September 1939, was by air observer Sergeant F. Letchford, aboard a Fairey Battle, flown by Flying Officer L.H. Baker.

In the Vietnam War, aerial observers also might be Forward Air Controllers (FACs). These O-1 Bird Dog, O-2 Skymaster and OV-10 Bronco pilots would slowly fly over an area and direct bombing by radio to fast-moving jet aircraft. In the U.S. Army, Aeroscout Observers were enlisted aircrew, often aircraft mechanics, who performed reconnaissance duties in OH-13, OH-6, and OH-58 observation helicopters.

== Current usage ==
Today, while a crewed aircraft is sometimes still utilised for aerial observation, industry and the military use both satellites and remotely piloted vehicles for this function.

The term is still used in some non-military contexts, such as police helicopter units.

"Observer" is still the term used in the Royal Navy's Fleet Air Arm (FAA) for non-pilot aircrew officers. The term dates back to one of the original roles of aircraft at sea, in the big gun era, which was to observe fall of shot, and radio back gunnery correction to their ship. Thus, the observer originally had to be a highly trained gunnery officer, often senior in rank to the pilot. Unusually, in the FAA, an observer could rise to squadron commander. Modern FAA anti-submarine and attack helicopters are still crewed by a pilot and observer, the observer being responsible for managing the detection and weapon systems—while the pilot does the flying, the observer "fights the aircraft" making the necessary tactical and navigational decisions.

== See also ==
- United States observer badges
