= 1916 in aviation =

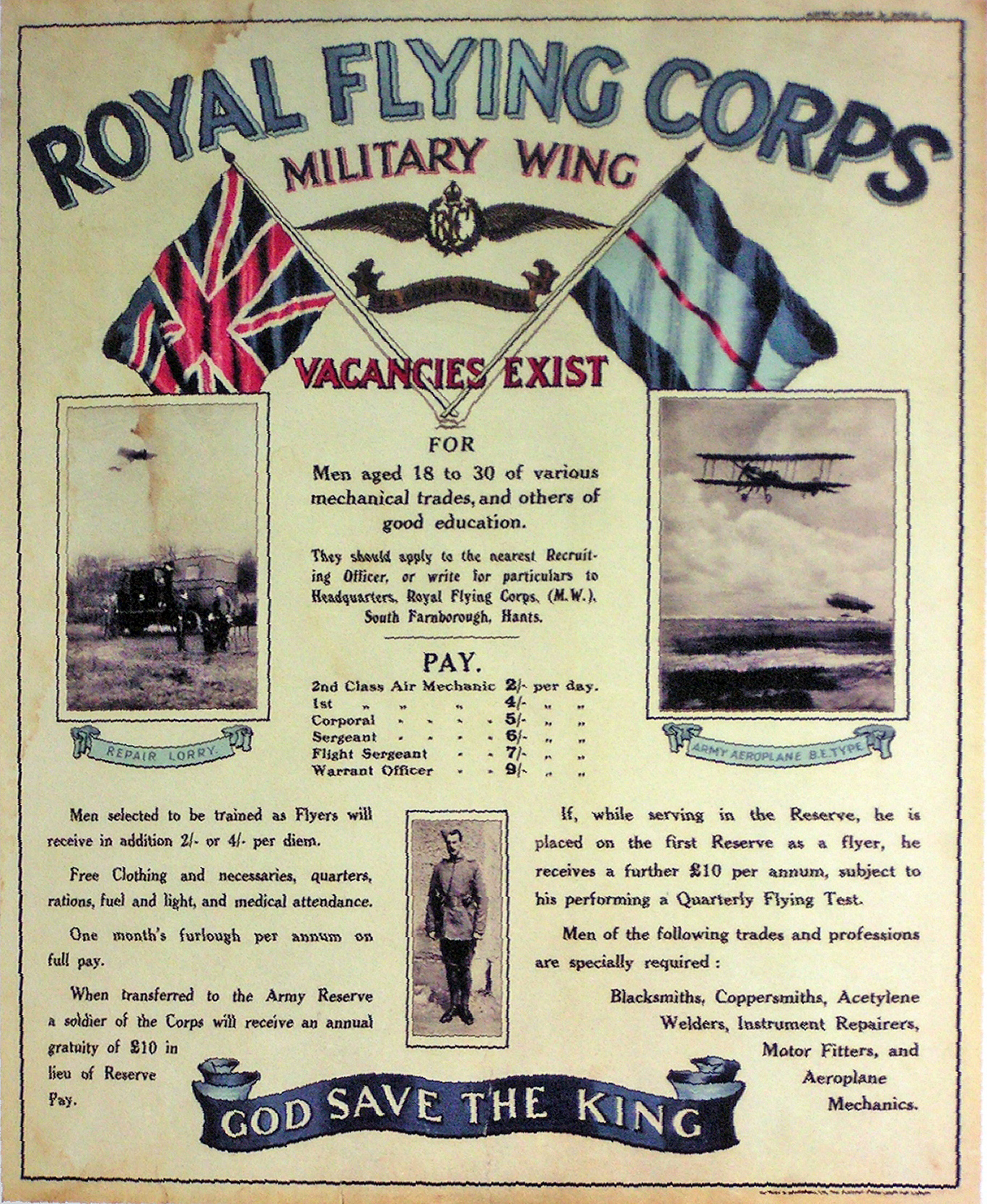

This is a list of aviation-related events from 1916:

== Events ==
- Imperial Japanese Navy aircraft simulate night torpedo attacks for the first time against Japanese fleet units in Tateyama Bay during annual fleet maneuvers, although no torpedoes are dropped.
- The British Admiralty invites bids for aircraft catapults for the first time, asking for electric, hydraulic, and compressed air catapults. It does not pursue electric or hydraulic types, but two compressed-air types are produced.
- Officers of the Chilean Navy begin flight training in Chile. It is the beginning of a Chilean naval aviation arm - the first Latin American naval air arm - which is subordinated to the Chilean Army's Military Aviation Service of Chile.
- Spring – British officials order one million rounds of .303-caliber (7.7-mm) explosive and incendiary ammunition for use by aircraft against German airships. The ammunition will be issued to Royal Flying Corps home air defense squadrons during the summer.

=== January ===
- On a single evening, 10 of the 16 Royal Flying Corps aircraft which take off to defend England against German air attack crash, killing three pilots. By May, RFC night flying skills will have improved to the point that 10 aircraft that take off on a single evening all land safely.
- January 12 – German aces Max Immelmann and Oswald Boelcke, each with eight kills, are the first pilots awarded the Pour le Mérite ("Blue Max").
- January 13 – The Curtiss Aeroplane Company, Curtiss Motor Company, Curtiss Engineering Company, and Burgess and Curtis merge to form the Curtiss Aeroplane and Motor Company.
- January 14 – In response to high losses German Fokker Eindecker fighters are inflicting on Allied reconnaissance aircraft flying over the Western Front, Royal Flying Corps Headquarters orders that reconnaissance planes have an escort of at least three fighters flying in close formation with them, and that a reconnaissance aircraft must abort its flight if even one of the three fighters becomes detached from the formation for any reason.
- January 18 – The world's first practical all-metal aircraft, the Junkers J 1, makes its first true flight.
- January 29 – The second and last Zeppelin raid on Paris inflicts 54 casualties.
- January 31-February 1 (overnight) – German airships resume bombing raids against the United Kingdom, as nine Imperial German Navy Zeppelins led personally by the chief of the German Naval Airship Division Peter Strasser attempt to attack Liverpool. None do, and they scatter their bombs widely around the English Midlands. Zeppelin L.19 (LZ 54) and her entire crew are lost in the raid; she is last seen on February 3 when the British trawler King Stephen finds her floating in the North Sea, speaks with her crew, and then leaves them to their fate.

=== February ===
- The German Army's air service, the Imperial German Flying Corps, takes the first step toward forming separate fighter squadrons by establishing Kampfeinsitzer Kommando ("single-seat battle unit," abbreviated as KEK) formations consisting only of fighter aircraft. KEK units form in France at Vaux-en-Vermandois, Avillers, Jametz, Cunel, and other strategic locations along the Western Front to act as Luftwachtdienst (aerial guard force) units.
- Command of all pilots, airplanes, and searchlights devoted to the defense of London from air attack is consolidated under a single commander – Major T. C. Higgins, the commanding officer of the Royal Flying Corps's No. 19 Reserve Squadron at Hounslow – for the first time.
- February 6 – Aircraft from the Imperial Russian Navy Black Sea Fleet's seaplane carriers Imperator Nikolai I and Imperator Aleksandr I sink the Ottoman collier Irmingard (4,211 grt). Irmingard is the largest ship sunk by air attack in World War I.
- February 21 – The Battle of Verdun begins. The Germans deploy 168 aircraft. To support the morale of French troops defending against the German offensive, the future French ace Jean Navarre soon begins daily aerobatic flights over the front line in a Nieuport 11 Bébé ("Baby") fighter with its fuselage painted in French red, white, and blue.
- February 26 – Merely by appearing behind a German two-seat aircraft over the Verdun battlefield, Jean Navarre induces its crew to land in French-held territory and surrender without ever firing a shot. Later that morning he shoots down a German bomber for his fifth victory.

=== March ===
- Air defense of the United Kingdom becomes solely the responsibility of the Royal Flying Corps; previously, it has shared the responsibility with the Royal Naval Air Service. The RFC is also authorized to form its first ten Home Defense squadrons.
- March 16 – United States Army aircraft fly their first mission over foreign soil when Curtiss JN-3s of the 1st Aero Squadron carry out reconnaissance over Mexico.
- March 18 – German ace Ernst Udet scores his first kill.
- March 21 – Captain-Commandant of the United States Coast Guard Ellsworth P. Bertholf orders Coast Guard experimentation with the use of aircraft and directs Third Lieutenant Elmer F. Stone to begin flight training. It is the birth of U.S. Coast Guard aviation.
- March 24 – Royal Flying Corps receives its first of many Nieuport fighters, a Nieuport 16.
- March 31–April 1 (overnight) – Seven German Navy Zeppelins attempt to bomb London. Two turn back with engine trouble, and L 15 is so badly damaged by British fighters and antiaircraft guns that she crash-lands off the coast of England and her crew is captured.

=== April ===
- A new French "balloon-busting" weapon, the Le Prieur rocket, is tested for the first time.
- The German Army's air service, the Fliegertruppe, sets a goal of having 37 new Jagdstaffeln (fighter squadrons) in service by April 1917.
- The Royal Flying Corps establishes its first Home Defense squadron, No. 39 Home Defense Squadron, at Hounslow.
- The Imperial Japanese Navy establishes its first land-based air group (Kōkūtai), the Yokosuka Naval Air Group.
- April 1
  - The Royal Naval Air Service Training Establishment, Cranwell, is founded at Cranwell, Lincolnshire, England. It later will become RAF Cranwell.
  - United States Coast Guard Third Lieutenant Elmer F. Stone begins flight training at Naval Air Station Pensacola in Pensacola, Florida. He is the first U.S. Coast Guard aviator.
- April 1–2 (overnight) through April 5–6 (overnight) – German Navy airships raid England for five more nights straight.
- April 15 – Royal Flying Corps and Royal Naval Air Service aircraft deliver 13 tons of stores into Kut el Amara, Mesopotamia, while it is besieged by the Turks. It is the first time aircraft are used for such a purpose.
- April 20 – The Escadrille Américaine ("American Squadron"), later to be known as the Lafayette Escadrille ("Lafayette Squadron"), is established as an American volunteer unit in France, equipped with Nieuport 11s.

=== May ===
- May 1 – Lydia Zvereva, the first Russian woman and eighth woman worldwide to earn a pilot's certificate, dies of typhoid fever at the age of 26.
- May 2 – Eight German Zeppelins raid the east coast of England, causing 39 casualties. The Zeppelin LZ 59 (L 20) is wrecked in a storm off Stavanger, Norway on the return journey.
- May 17 – Parasite fighter experiments to launch a Bristol Scout fighter from a Felixstowe Porte Baby trimotor flying boat begin in the United Kingdom with a successful flight and separation by the two aircraft. The experiments are intended to enhance the capability of fighter aircraft to intercept German dirigibles patrolling over the North Sea at high altitudes. The concept soon falls out of favor as experiments with launching aircraft from ships meet with success.
- May 18 – Kiffin Rockwell shoots down a German two-seater aircraft, the first aerial victory claimed by the Lafayette Escadrille, an American-manned squadron of the French Air Service.
- May 19 – French ace Jean Navarre shoots down a German Aviatik C over Chattancourt, France, becoming the first Allied ace credited with 10 victories.
- May 22 – The first operational use of rockets by aircraft, and the first aircraft-on-aircraft use of rockets, takes place when eight French aces including Charles Nungesser, Joseph-Henri Guiguet, and Jean Chaput flying Nieuport 16s make an early-morning attack that downed six German observation balloons using Le Prieur rockets.
- May 31 – A Short Type 184 from the Royal Navy seaplane carrier Engadine achieves the only British aerial reconnaissance flight of the Battle of Jutland, reporting the sighting of three cruisers and ten destroyers of the German High Seas Fleet before a broken fuel pipe forces it to end the mission.

=== June ===
- Oswald Boelcke's Dicta Boelcke, the first pamphlet on tactics for aerial warfare, is distributed to the German Air Service.
- June 9 – American naval aviation pioneer Richard C. Saufley is killed on Santa Rosa Island during a flight from Naval Aeronautic Station Pensacola, Florida when his Curtiss Model E hydroplane AH-8 goes down at the 8-hour-51-minute mark of his flight.
- June 15 – The Boeing Model 1, or B & W Seaplane, makes its first flight.
- June 17 – The first French ace, Jean Navarre, is shot down and wounded, ending his combat career with 12 confirmed kills.
- June 18 – The first German ace, Max Immelmann, is shot down and killed by an FE.2b from the Royal Flying Corps's No. 25 Squadron, a symbolic end to the "Fokker Scourge". He had scored 15 kills.
- June 24
  - Victor Chapman of the Lafayette Escadrille becomes the first American airman to be killed in action, shot down near Verdun-sur-Meuse.
  - Eduardo Bradley and Angel María Zuloaga became the first to cross the Andes on an aerostat filled with coal gas. The eastbound flight reached an altitude of 8,100m where the temperature dropped to −30 °C. The adventure lasted three and a half hours from the moment of liftoff in Santiago to the landing in Cerro de la Cepa, Uspallata, Mendoza.
- June 25 – Aviator Charles Franklin Niles crashes while performing ground loops at Oshkosh, Wisconsin, and dies from his injuries.
- June 30
  - The first flight of an aircraft with all-metal stressed skin construction, the Zeppelin-Lindau Rs.II, takes place.
  - Since January 1, 46 German airship sorties have crossed the coast of England between Yorkshire and Kent, and German airships have attacked London twice. British aircraft defending England have contributed (with antiaircraft guns) to the shooting down of only one German airship.

=== July ===
- The Royal Naval Air Service's No. 3 Wing becomes Britain's first strategic bombing unit, equipped with Sopwith 1½ Strutters.
- July 1 – The Battle of the Somme begins. In the five months of the battle, the British lose 782 aircraft and 576 pilots but maintain air superiority over the battlefield.
- July 12 – The United States Navy armored cruiser North Carolina becomes the first ship to launch an aircraft by catapult while underway, launching a Curtiss flying boat piloted by Lieutenant Godfrey Chevalier.
- July 15 – William Boeing founds the Pacific Aero Products Company in Seattle. In 1917 it will be renamed Boeing Airplane Company.
- July 18 – Morane-Saulnier monoplanes in French service have all their metal parts (spinners, struts, and cowlings) painted red to avoid confusion with German Fokker monoplanes, the first time markings are used to identify a type of aircraft.

=== August ===
- The Imperial German Flying Corps (Fliegertruppen des Deutschen Kaiserreiches) creates its first single-seat fighter squadrons, or Jagdstaffeln.
- The Imperial Russian Navy's Black Sea Fleet raids Varna, Bulgaria, employing a seaplane carrier-battleship force.
- August 2 – A Bristol Scout C from the Royal Navy seaplane carrier Vindex unsuccessfully attacks the German Zeppelin L 17. It is the first interception of an airship by a carrier-based aircraft.
- August 6 – French ace Capitaine René Fonck gains his first confirmed victory. He will become the highest-scoring Allied and second-highest-scoring ace overall of World War I.
- August 23 – The Brazilian Navy establishes a naval aviation arm with the creation of a naval aviation school.
- August 24–25 (overnight) – Led by the commander of the Imperial German Navy's airship force, Peter Strasser, aboard the Zeppelin L 32, 13 German naval airships attack England. Several are damaged by British antiaircraft fire and a British seaplane and most of their bombs miss their targets widely, but L 31 under Kapitänleutnant Heinrich Mathy bombs southeast London, inflicting £130,000 in damage, including damage to a power station at Deptford, and killing nine and injuring 40 civilians.
- August 27
  - Romania enters World War I on the Allied side, declaring war on Austria-Hungary.
  - Oswald Boelcke creates the first German special fighter squadron, Jagdstaffel 2 (or Jasta 2).

=== September ===
- The Wright Company and the first Glenn L. Martin Company merge to form the Wright-Martin Aircraft Corporation.
- A formation of German Gotha G.III heavy bombers destroys the railway bridge over the Danube River at Cernavodă, Romania.
- September 2–3 (overnight) – 12 German Navy and four German Army airships raid southeast England in the largest airship raid of World War I; they drop 823 bombs totaling 38,979 pounds (17,681 kg), killing four people and injuring 12 and causing over £21,000 in damage. Royal Flying Corps Lieutenant William Leefe-Robinson, flying a B.E.2c, shoots down the German Army Schütte-Lanz airship SL 11, which falls spectacularly in flames near London, killing her entire crew of 16. Leefe-Robinson becomes the second pilot to shoot down an airship and the first to do it over the United Kingdom, and the German Army Airship Service withdraws from future bombing raids on England, leaving the bombing campaign to German naval airships. It is considered the turning point in the defense of the United Kingdom against German airship raids.
- September 5 – It is announced that Lieutenant William Leefe-Robinson has received the Victoria Cross for shooting down SL-11.
- September 15 – Two Austro-Hungarian Lohner flying boats, led by Fregattenleutnant Zelezny, sink the British submarine B-10 and the French submarine Foucault. B10 is the first submarine sunk by aircraft, and Foucault is the first submarine sunk at sea by aircraft.
- September 16
  - Two Imperial German Navy airships, the Zeppelins L 6 and L 9, are destroyed by fire in their hangar due to an inflation accident.
  - The future Schiphol Airport opens as a Dutch military airfield southwest of Amsterdam, the Netherlands.
- September 17
  - Flying an Albatros D.II, German Rittmeister Manfred von Richthofen scores his first kill, shooting down a F.E.2b of the Royal Flying Corps's No. 11 Squadron over Villers-Plouich, France, and mortally wounding its two-man crew. He will go on to become the highest-scoring ace of World War I, with 80 victories.
  - Flying a Grigorovich M-9, test pilot Jan Nagórski becomes the first person to loop a flying boat. After this success, he loops an M-9 twice the following day.
- September 23–24 (overnight) – Twelve German Navy Zeppelins attack England. Most scatter their bombs widely, and bombs strike Nottingham and Grimsby. L 33 bombs central London with 42 high-explosive and 20 incendiary bombs, hitting several warehouses and setting fire to an oil depot, a lumber yard, and several groups of houses, with 10 people killed and 12 seriously injured. L 31 under Heinrich Mathy also bombs London, destroying a tramcar, damaging houses and shops, and killing 13 and injuring 33 people. Two of the newest Zeppelins are shot down, L 33 by ground fire and L 32 by Royal Air Force Lieutenant Frederick Sowrey; L 33's crew is captured at Little Wigborough (the only armed enemy personnel to set foot in the United Kingdom during World War I) and L 32's crew is killed. Their loss shocks the German naval airship commander Peter Strasser.
- September 25–26 (overnight) – Nine German Navy Zeppelins set out to attack England. Some turn back and the rest scatter their bombs widely over the countryside and sea. L 22, however, bombs an armament factory complex in Sheffield, killing 28 and injuring 19 people, and L 21 drops several bombs on Bolton.

=== October ===
- October 1–2 (overnight) – Eleven German Navy Zeppelins set out to attack England. Three turn back and the others fail to drop their bombs or scatter their bombs widely, killing one British soldier. Royal Flying Corps Second Lieutenant W. J. Tempest in a B.E.2c shoots down L 31 in flames outside London, killing its entire crew, including the famed airship commander Heinrich Mathy, who leaps to his death from the burning Zeppelin.
- October 5 – Concerned that civil aviation might not be taken seriously after World War I and anticipating the growth of civil air transport after the war, the British aviation pioneer George Holt Thomas registers Aircraft Transport & Travel Limited. In 1919, the company will become the first to operate a London-Paris airline service.
- October 8 – Die Fliegertruppen des Deutschen Kaiserreiches ("The flying troops of the German Kaiser’s Reich"), the air arm of the Imperial German Army (Deutsches Heer), is reorganized and renamed the Luftstreitkräfte ("German Air Combat Forces"). In either cause, the service's name usually is translated into English as "Imperial German Air Service."
- October 12
  - Canadian Royal Naval Air Service ace Raymond Collishaw claims his first victory.
  - American aviation pioneer Tony Jannus and two crewmen are killed near Sevastopol in the Russian Empire when the Curtiss Model H-7 flying boat he is using to train Russian pilots has engine problems and crashes into the Black Sea.
- October 18 – Italian future ace Pier Ruggero Piccio scores his first aerial victory, shooting down an enemy observation balloon.
- October 19 – German Navy Zeppelins participate in a High Seas Fleet sortie into the North Sea. The Zeppelin L 14 sights part of the Royal Navy's Harwich Force, but German and British ships do not come into contact with one another. Five Zeppelins suffer serious mechanical breakdowns during the operation.
- October 28 – German ace Hauptmann Oswald Boelcke is killed in a mid-air collision between his Albatros D.II and the fighter of the German ace Erwin Böhme. A highly influential pilot considered by the some the "father" of the German fighter force, and the author of the Dicta Boelcke, the first formal codification of the rules of aerial warfare, he is Germany's leading ace with 40 victories at the time of his death. World War I will end with him tied with Oberleutnant Lothar von Richthofen and Leutnant Franz Buchner as the 10th-highest-scoring German aces of the conflict.
- October 31 – A new biplane prototype American aviation pioneer Silas Christofferson is piloting to demonstrate its safety suffers engine failure at an altitude of 200 feet (61 metres) and crashes at Redwood City, California. He dies of internal injuries a few hours later.

=== November ===
- November 16 – Samuel Waring forms the Nieuport & General Aircraft Company in Cricklewood, London, to build Nieuport 11 fighters in the United Kingdom under license. It later will build Nieuport 17bis, Sopwith Camel, and Sopwith Snipe fighters.
- November 19 – Ruth Law sets a new distance record for cross-country flight by flying 590 miles (950 km) non-stop from Chicago to New York State. She flies on to New York City the next day.
- November 23 – After a lengthy dogfight British ace Lanoe Hawker VC, flying an Airco DH.2, is shot down and killed by Manfred von Richthofen in an Albatros D.II. Lanoe's score stands at seven kills at the time of his death, and he is von Richthofen's 11th victory.
- November 27–28 (overnight) – Eight German Navy Zeppelins set out to attack industrial targets in the British Midlands. Plagued by bad weather, mechanical problems, and British air defenses, they accomplish little, although L 34 bombs West Hartlepool, killing four and injuring 11 people. Royal Flying Corps Second Lieutenant Ian V. Pyott of No. 36 Squadron shoots down L 34 in flames over Castle Eden, killing her entire crew including her famed commander Max Dietrich. Soon thereafter, three Royal Naval Air Service BE.2cs, one of them flown by Flight Lieutenant Egbert Cadbury, shoot down L 21 off Lowestoft.
- November 28 – The first bombing of central London by a fixed-wing aircraft takes place when a German LVG C.II biplane flown by R. Brandt drops six bombs near Victoria station.

=== December ===
- December 26–27 (overnight) – In Operation Iron Cross, the Imperial German Navy dirigibles L 35 and L 38 attempt the first bombing of Petrograd, Russia. Neither bombs the target due to clouds and bad weather, and L 38 makes a forced landing at Seemuppen, Courland, in German-occupied Russia, where strong winds eventually destroy her on December 29.
- December 28 – While ground crewman are walking the German Navy Zeppelin L 24 to her shed at Tondern, Germany, she is slammed against her hangar by wind and catches fire. She and the Zeppelin L 17, which is in the hangar, are destroyed in the resulting blaze.
- December 28–29 (overnight) – Six German Navy airships – five Zeppelins and the Schütte-Lanz SL12 – attempt a raid on England but are recalled due to bad weather. SL12 is unable to return to base and lands nearby, where she is battered to pieces by wind.
- December 31 – 17,341 officers and men are deployed in the United Kingdom for home air defense. Among them are 12,000 officers and men manning antiaircraft guns and 2,200 officers and men assigned to the 12 Royal Flying Corps squadrons assigned to home air defense, operating 110 aeroplanes.

== First flights ==
- Airco DH.6
- Avro 519
- Avro 522
- Caudron G.6
- Caudron R.11
- Gotha G.III
- Grigorovich M-11
- Grigorovich M-20
- Hansa-Brandenburg D.I
- Letord Let.1
- Siemens-Schuckert D.I
- Voisin VIII
- Early 1916 – Avro 527
- Early 1916 – Nieuport 16
- Spring 1916 – Siemens-Schuckert Forssman

=== January ===
- Nieuport 17
- ca. January – Siemens-Schuckert R.IV
- January 9 – Grigorovich M-9
- January 18 – Junkers J.1

=== February ===
- February 9 - Sopwith Pup flown by Harry Hawker

=== March ===
- Gotha G.II

=== April ===
- SPAD S.VII

=== May ===
- Armstrong Whitworth F.K.8
- Avro 523 Pike
- May 28 - Sopwith Triplane flown by Harry Hawker

=== June ===
- ca. June – Siemens-Schuckert R.V
- June 15 - B & W Seaplane, William Boeing's first aircraft.
- June 16 - Port Victoria P.V.2
- June 17 - Royal Aircraft Factory R.E.8

=== July ===
- Felixstowe F.2
- ca. July – Siemens-Schuckert R.VI
- July 25 - Anatra DS

=== August ===
- Airco DH.4
- Airco DH.5
- Albatros D.III

=== September ===
- September 9 - Bristol F.2A
- September 12 - Hewitt-Sperry Automatic Airplane

=== October ===
- October 25 - Bristol F.2B Fighter

=== November ===
- Nieuport 15
- November 21 - Breguet 14
- November 22 - Royal Aircraft Factory S.E.5
- November 27 - British airship No. 9r

=== December ===
- December 10 – Avro 528
- December 24 – Sopwith Camel

== Entered service ==
- Albatros C.V
- Grigorovich M-16 with the Imperial Russian Navy
- FBA Type H with various armed forces
- Nieuport 14
- Early 1916 – Halberstadt D.II with the Imperial German Flying Corps
- Autumn 1916 – Hansa-Brandenburg D.I with the Austro-Hungarian Imperial and Royal Aviation Troops
- Late 1916 – Albatros C.III

=== January ===
- January 29 – Siemens-Schuckert R.IV with the German Luftstreitkräfte

=== February ===
- Airco DH.2 with No. 24 Squadron RFC
- Gotha UWD with the Imperial German Navy

=== March ===
- Nieuport 17

=== April ===
- Siemens-Schuckert Forssman with the German Luftstreitkräfte
- Sopwith 1½ Strutter

=== July ===
- July 20 – Siemens-Schuckert R.VI with the German Luftstreitkräfte

=== August ===
- Gotha G.II with the Imperial German Flying Corps
- SPAD S.VII with Escadrille No. 26 of the French Army's Service Aeronautique
- August 13 – Siemens-Schuckert R.V with the German Luftstreitkräfte

=== October ===
- Caudron R.4 with the French Army's Service Aeronautique

=== November ===
- Sopwith Triplane
- Voisin VIII

=== December ===
- December 24 - Sopwith Pup with No. 54 Squadron RFC

== Retirements ==
=== March ===
- Avro 510 by the Royal Naval Air Service

=== April ===
- Avro 508

=== October ===
- October 2 – Gotha UWD by the Imperial German Navy
