= Averyanov =

Averyanov (Russian: Аверьянов; masculine) or Averyanova (Аверьянова; feminine) is a Russian last name.

There are two theories regarding the origins of this last name. According to the first one, it is a form of the last name Averkiyev and derives from the Russian male first name Averky, one of the forms of which is "Averyan". However, it is also possible that this last name derives from "Averyan", a corruption of the name Valerian.

People with the last name

- Aleksandr Averyanov (disambiguation), several people
- Aleksei Averyanov (b. 1985), Russian association football player
- Andrei Averyanov (b. 1966), Russian general of GRU
- Irina Averyanova, basketball player, squad member at the 2011 FIBA Asia Championship for Women
- Lidiya Averyanova, Soviet rower participating in the Friendship Games
- Lyubov Averyanova, Russian weightlifter, silver medalist in the Women 46 kg discounted event of a European Weightlifting Championship
- Nikolay Averyanov (disambiguation), several people
- Pavel Averyanov (b. 1984), Russian association football player
- Pavel Averyanov (basketball), Turkmenistani basketball player participating in the 2012 FIBA Asia Champions Cup
- Yevgeni Averyanov, Russian association football coach of FC Ural Sverdlovsk Oblast

Fictional characters

- Averyanov, a character in the 1991 movie A Captive in the Land

Toponyms

- Averyanov, alternative name of the rural locality (a settlement) of Averyanovka in Kologrivsky District of Kostroma Oblast, Russia; 58°7′N 44°21′E

== See also ==
- Averyanovka, several rural localities in Russia
