= Siemens-Schuckert R.IV =

Bomber aircraft built by Germany

R.IV

General information
- Type: Bomber
- National origin: Germany
- Manufacturer: Siemens-Schuckert
- Designer: Bruno and Franz Steffen
- Number built: 1

History
- First flight: c. January 1916
- Developed from: Siemens-Schuckert R.I

The Siemens-Schuckert R.IV was a bomber aircraft built in Germany during World War I. It was one of six aircraft based on the Siemens-Schuckert R.I that were originally intended to be identical, but which each developed in a different direction and were designated as different aircraft types by the German Inspectorate of Flying Troops (the Idflieg). The Maybach HS engines specified by the Idflieg proved unreliable, but with these engines were replaced by Benz Bz.IV engines, the R.IV saw service on the Eastern Front before being relegated to training duties.

== Design and development ==
As designed, the R.IV was a large three-bay biplane with unstaggered wings of unequal span and a fully enclosed cabin. The three 180-kW (240-hp) Maybach HS engines were mounted internally in the fuselage, and transmitted their power via driveshafts to two propellers mounted tractor-fashion on the interplane struts nearest the fuselage. The main undercarriage consisted of divided units, each of which carried dual wheels, and the tail was supported by a pair of tailwheels. The fuselage was forked into an upper and lower section, which allowed a clear field of fire to the rear of the aircraft.

Siemens-Schuckert delivered the R.IV to the German military on 29 January 1916, and trouble with the engines began almost immediately. Shortly after test flights commenced, it was necessary to replace the original HS engines with new ones. While the engines were being replaced, a number of other modifications were carried out, including replacing the original nose-mounted radiators with aerofoil-shaped radiators fitted in the upper wing and adding new gravity-fed fuel tanks. With these improvements in place, the R.IV flew again in May 1916. Even then, the engines overheated until one of the cylinders turned blue.

Siemens-Schuckert engineers believed that with still larger radiators, the Maybach engines could be made to work on this aircraft. However, the firm lacked the personnel and the experience to undertake engine development. Therefore, while Siemens-Schuckert asked the Idflieg to allow them to substitute Benz Bz.IV engines on the R.II and R.III the firm suggested that the Idflieg accept the R.IV in its current state, including its Maybach engines, so that they could oversee a development programme for the engine themselves. The Idflieg agreed to this suggestion and lowered its specifications for the R.IV accordingly. The R.IV passed the new requirements on an acceptance flight on 27 August 1916, and was accepted into service with the Riesenflugzeugersatzabteilung (Rea — "giant aircraft support unit") the same day.

Within a few months, the R.IV's wings had been extended by adding an extra bay to them and in November 1916, the Maybach engines were finally replaced by Benz Bz.IV engines, probably while the R.IV was being repaired after a crash. Before the aircraft flew with its new engines, a fifth bay was added to the wings. All work was completed by 14 February 1917, and the refurbished aircraft flew on 14 March.

The R.IV was assigned to Riesenflugzeugabteilung 501 (Rfa 501) at Vilna on 27 April 1917. It was used operationally until Rfa 501 was redeployed to the Western Front, at which point it was left behind in Vilna for use as a trainer with the Riesenflugzeug Schulabteilung ("giant aircraft training unit"). The R.IV continued in this role at Vilna until early 1918, when it was withdrawn to Berlin. On 22 June 1918, it was damaged in a forced landing and was not repaired until 28 August.

The Siemens-Schuckert R.II to R.VII were ordered in the G (Grossflugzeug - large aircraft) series and given serial numbers G.32/15 to G.37/15 respectively. These serials were changed on 13 July 1915 to G.33/15 - G.38/15, for unknown reasons and again on 6 November 1915 to R.2/15 - R.7/15 in the R (Riesenflugzeug - giant aircraft) series, adopting the R.II to R.VII designations.

== Operational history ==
Specific details of five operational missions while with Rfa 501 have survived. In each case, the raid was carried out together with the R.VI and R.VII:

- 1 April 1917 — town of Naracz
- 5 April 1917 — railway station at Vileyka
- 5 June 1917 — troop camp at Biala
- 18 June 1917 — supply dump at Overky
- 2 August 1917 — reconnaissance mission over railway station at Prudy

== Specifications ==
Data from Grey & Thetford 1962, p.573

General characteristics

- Crew: 4
- Length: 18 m (59 ft 1 in)
- Wingspan: 37.6 m (123 ft 5 in)
- Height: 4.6 m (15 ft 1 in)
- Wing area: 201 m^{2} (2,171 sq ft)
- Empty weight: 5,450 kg (11,990 lb)
- Gross weight: 6,900 kg (15,180 lb)
- Powerplant: 3 × Benz Bz.IV , 160 kW (220 hp) each

Performance

- Maximum speed: 130 km/h (81 mph, 70 kn)
- Endurance: 4 hours

Armament

- 4 x machine guns
