= Siemens-Schuckert R.VI =

German bomber aircraft

R.VI
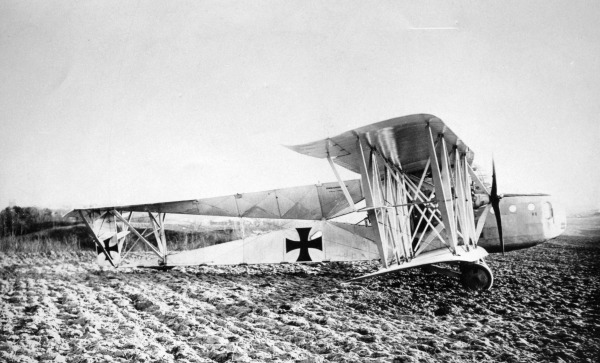
- The R.VI after a forced landing

General information
- Type: Bomber
- National origin: Germany
- Manufacturer: Siemens-Schuckert
- Designer: Bruno and Franz Steffen
- Number built: 1

History
- First flight: c. April 1916
- Developed from: Siemens-Schuckert R.I

The Siemens-Schuckert R.VI was a bomber aircraft built in Germany during World War I. It was one of six aircraft based on the Siemens-Schuckert R.I, which were originally intended to be identical. Each developed in a different direction and were designated as different aircraft types by the German Inspectorate of Flying Troops (the Idflieg).

Development of the R.VI benefited from the experience that Siemens-Schuckert and the Idflieg had gained with the R.II, R.III, and R.IV, particularly in its choice of powerplants, where the R.VI was spared from the troublesome Maybach HS engine. The R.VI was the first of the Siemens-Schuckert R-type aircraft to reach service, and saw service on the Eastern Front between July 1916 and November 1917, before it was declared obsolete and dismantled.

== Design and development ==
As designed, the R.VI was a large three-bay biplane with unstaggered wings of unequal span and a fully enclosed cabin. Three 180-kW (240-hp) Maybach HS engines were mounted internally in the fuselage, and transmitted their power via driveshafts to two propellers mounted tractor-fashion on the interplane struts nearest the fuselage. The main undercarriage consisted of divided units, each of which carried dual wheels, and the tail was supported by a pair of tailwheels. The fuselage was forked into an upper and lower section, which allowed a clear field of fire to the rear of the aircraft.

The Maybach engines had been a never-ending source of trouble on the R.II, R.III, and R.IV, and by June 1916, Siemens-Schuckert had obtained permission from the Idflieg to substitute Benz Bz.IV engines on the R.III The firm made the same change on the R.VI, which was under construction at the time. The fuselage was modified to accommodate the new powerplant, and an extra bay was added to the wings, increasing their span. Upon completion, designer Bruno Steffen piloted the R.VI on a test flight in which the aircraft carried a 2,400-kg (5,300-lb) load for six hours, a world record at the time, but one which was never publicised due to the war.

Despite this remarkable flight, the R.VI did not meet the specifications issued by the Idflieg in its contract with Siemens-Schuckert. Therefore, the Idflieg opted to relax the original specifications somewhat and complete the purchase of the aircraft.

The Siemens-Schuckert R.II to R.VII were ordered in the G (Grossflugzeug - large aircraft) series and given serial numbers G.32/15 to G.37/15 respectively. These serials were changed on 13 July 1915 to G.33/15 - G.38/15, for unknown reasons and again on 6 November 1915 to R.2/15 - R.7/15 in the R (Riesenflugzeug - giant aircraft) series, adopting the R.II to R.VII designations.

== Operational history ==
Siemens-Schuckert delivered the R.VI to the Riesenflugzeugersatzabteilung (Rea — "giant aircraft support unit") at Döberitz on 20 July 1916. From there, it was assigned to Riesenflugzeugabteilung 501 (Rfa 501), and joined the squadron at Vilna on 7 August. It operated there until it was dismantled as obsolete in November 1917.

Specific details of several operational missions while with Rfa 501 have survived:

- 3 September 1916 — railway station at Molodeczne
- 4 September 1916 — unknown target

Additionally, the R.VI carried out the following raids together with the R.V:

- 19 January 1917 — troop camp at Iza
- 30 January 1917 — railway station at Wileyka
- 8 February 1917 — railway station at Molodeczne
- 12 February 1917 — railway station at Zalesie

together with the R.VII:

- 2 March 1917 — railway stations at Zalesie and Molodeczne
- 7 March 1917 — railway stations at Wileyka and Molodeczne
- 16 March 1917 — troop camp at Iza

and together with the R.IV and R.VII:

- 1 April 1917 — town of Naracz
- 5 April 1917 — railway station at Wileyka
- 5 June 1917 — troop camp at Biala
- 18 June 1917 — supply dump at Overky
- 2 August 1917 — reconnaissance mission over railway station at Prudy

== Specifications ==
Data from Kroschel & Stützer 1994, p.141

General characteristics

- Crew: 4
- Length: 17.7 m (58 ft 1 in)
- Wingspan: 33.36 m (109 ft 6 in)
- Height: 4.6 m (15 ft 8 in)
- Wing area: 177 m^{2} (1,910 sq ft)
- Empty weight: 5,250 kg (11,550 lb)
- Gross weight: 6,660 kg (14,650 lb)
- Powerplant: 3 × Benz Bz.IV , 150 kW (200 hp) each

Performance

- Maximum speed: 132 km/h (83 mph, 72 kn)
- Range: 720 km (450 mi, 390 nmi)
- Service ceiling: 2,950 m (19,400 ft)

Armament

- 3 × 7.9-mm machine guns
- 500 kg of bombs
