= Siemens-Schuckert R.V =

R.V

General information
- Type: Bomber
- National origin: Germany
- Manufacturer: Siemens-Schuckert
- Designer: Bruno and Franz Steffen
- Number built: 1

History
- First flight: c. June 1916
- Developed from: Siemens-Schuckert R.I

The Siemens-Schuckert R.V was a bomber aircraft built in Germany during World War I. It was one of six aircraft based on the Siemens-Schuckert R.I that were originally intended to be identical, but which each developed in a different direction and were designated as different aircraft types by the German Inspectorate of Flying Troops (the Idflieg). Development of the R.V benefited from the experience that Siemens-Schuckert and the Idflieg had gained with the R.II, R.III, and R.IV, particularly in its choice of powerplants, where the R.V was spared from the troublesome Maybach HS engine. Between September 1916 and February 1917, the aircraft saw service on the Eastern Front before it was damaged in an accident and dismantled for spare parts.

== Design and development ==
As designed, the R.V was a large three-bay biplane with unstaggered wings of unequal span and a fully enclosed cabin. Three 180-kW (240-hp) Maybach HS engines were mounted internally in the fuselage, and transmitted their power via driveshafts to two propellers mounted tractor-fashion on the interplane struts nearest the fuselage. The main undercarriage consisted of divided units, each of which carried dual wheels, and the tail was supported by a pair of tailwheels. The fuselage was forked into an upper and lower section, which allowed a clear field of fire to the rear of the aircraft. The Maybach engines had been a never-ending source of trouble on the R.II, R.III, and R.IV, and by June 1916, Siemens-Schuckert had obtained permission from the Idflieg to substitute Benz Bz.IV engines on the R.III The firm made the same change on the R.V, which was almost complete by then. The substitution required an almost complete rebuild of the aircraft, and included adding an extra bay to the wings, increasing their span. The Idflieg accepted the R.V in this form, after agreeing to a reduction in the aircraft's original specifications.

The Siemens-Schuckert R.II to R.VII were ordered in the G (Grossflugzeug - large aircraft) series and given serial numbers G.32/15 to G.37/15 respectively. These serials were changed on 13 July 1915 to G.33/15 - G.38/15, for unknown reasons and again on 6 November 1915 to R.2/15 - R.7/15 in the R (Riesenflugzeug - giant aircraft) series, adopting the R.II to R.VII designations.

== Operational history ==
Siemens-Schuckert delivered the R.V to the Riesenflugzeugersatzabteilung (Rea — "giant aircraft support unit") at Döberitz on 13 August 1916. From there, it was assigned to Riesenflugzeugabteilung 501 (Rfa 501), and joined the squadron at Vilna on 3 September. It was used operationally until the week of 14 February 1917, when the aircraft was severely damaged during a hard landing at night that fractured its fuselage. The R.V was then dismantled and sent back to Döberitz where it could be used for spare parts for other Siemens-Schuckert bombers.

Specific details of several operational missions while with Rfa 501 have survived:

- 14–15 October 1916 — railway station at Wileyka
- 26 November 1916 — troop camp at Iza
- 7 January 1917 — railway station at Poloczany

Additionally, the R.V carried out the following raids together with the R.VI:

- 19 January 1917 — troop camp at Iza
- 30 January 1917 — railway station at Wileyka
- 8 February 1917 — railway station at Molodeczne
- 12 February 1917 — railway station at Zalesie

== Specifications ==
Data from Kroschel & Stützer 1994, p.141

General characteristics

- Crew: 4
- Length: 17.7 m (58 ft 1 in)
- Wingspan: 34.33 m (112 ft 8 in)
- Height: 4.6 m (15 ft 8 in)
- Wing area: 177 m^{2} (1,910 sq ft)
- Empty weight: 5,300 kg (11,600 lb)
- Gross weight: 6,766 kg (14,885 lb)
- Powerplant: 3 × Benz Bz.IV , 150 kW (200 hp) each

Performance

- Maximum speed: 132 km/h (83 mph, 72 kn)
- Range: 480 km (300 mi, 260 nmi)
- Service ceiling: 3,000 m (9,800 ft)

Armament

- 3 × 7.9-mm machine guns
- 500 kg of bombs
