= Siemens-Schuckert R.VII =

R.VII
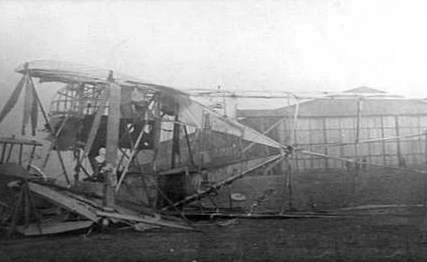
- The R.VII wrecked at Cologne

General information
- Type: Bomber
- National origin: Germany
- Manufacturer: Siemens-Schuckert
- Designer: Bruno and Franz Steffen
- Number built: 1

History
- First flight: 15 January 1917
- Developed from: Siemens-Schuckert R.I

The Siemens-Schuckert R.VII was a bomber aircraft built in Germany during World War I. It was one of six aircraft based on the Siemens-Schuckert R.I that were originally intended to be identical, but which each developed in a different direction and were designated as different aircraft types by the German Inspectorate of Flying Troops (the Idflieg).

Development of earlier derivatives of the R.I revealed serious problems with the Maybach HS engine originally specified for these aircraft, and the R.VII was fitted with Mercedes D.IVa engines instead. From February 1917 to the summer of that year, the R.VII saw service on the Eastern Front before it was retired to training duties.

== Design and development ==
As designed, the R.VI was a large three-bay biplane with unstaggered wings of unequal span and a fully enclosed cabin. Three 180-kW (240-hp) Maybach HS engines were mounted internally in the fuselage, and transmitted their power via driveshafts to two propellers mounted tractor-fashion on the interplane struts nearest the fuselage. The main undercarriage consisted of divided units, each of which carried dual wheels, and the tail was supported by a pair of tailwheels. The fuselage was forked into an upper and lower section, which allowed a clear field of fire to the rear of the aircraft.

The Maybach engines had been a never-ending source of trouble on the R.II, R.III, and R.IV, and during 1916, the engines of the R.III, R.IV, R.V, and R.VI were replaced with Benz Bz.IV engines either at the factory or in the field, while the R.II received the more powerful Mercedes D.IVa. The latter powerplant was also selected for the R.VII, still under construction at the time. Apart from the new engines, the R.VII also received extensive modifications while still at the factory, including overall strengthening to take the greater weight of the heavier Mercedes engines, as well as changes to the fuel tanks, propellers, and undercarriage. The wings were completely redesigned to incorporate heavier spars and a new rib section and gained two extra bays, to provide a greater span.

Siemens-Schuckert delivered the R.VII to the Riesenflugzeugersatzabteilung (Rea — "giant aircraft support unit") at Döberitz on 20 November 1916, and test flights commenced on 15 January 1917. The wings were found to be too heavy, and were again replaced with a new design.

The Siemens-Schuckert R.II to R.VII were ordered in the G (Grossflugzeug - large aircraft) series and given serial numbers G.32/15 to G.37/15 respectively. These serials were changed on 13 July 1915 to G.33/15 - G.38/15, for unknown reasons and again on 6 November 1915 to R.2/15 - R.7/15 in the R (Riesenflugzeug - giant aircraft) series, adopting the R.II to R.VII designations.

== Operational history ==
The R.VII was assigned to Riesenflugzeugabteilung 501 (Rfa 501), and joined the squadron at Vilna on 26 February 1917. There, a number of field modifications were made, including the addition of extra bomb racks under the fuselage and wings that more than doubled the original bomb load from 300 kg to 750 kg (660 lb to 1,650 lb). Additionally, a wireless sender and receiver were installed, which allowed the R.VII to participate in radio navigation experiments.

The R.VII flew its first combat mission on 15 March 1917 and continued in operational use until Rfa 501 was transferred to the Western Front in the summer. The R.VII remained in Vilna, transferred to the Riesenflugzeug Schulabteilung ("giant aircraft training unit"), with which it was still in service in early 1918.

Specific details of several operational missions while with Rfa 501 have survived. All these missions were accompanied by the R.VI:

- 2 March 1917 — railway stations at Zalesie and Molodeczne
- 7 March 1917 — railway stations at Wileyka and Molodeczne
- 16 March 1917 — troop camp at Iza

these missions included the R.IV too:

- 1 April 1917 — town of Naracz
- 5 April 1917 — railway station at Wileyka
- 5 June 1917 — troop camp at Biala
- 18 June 1917 — supply dump at Overky
- 2 August 1917 — reconnaissance mission over railway station at Prudy

== Specifications ==
Data from Kroschel & Stützer 1994, p.151

General characteristics

- Crew: 4
- Length: 18.5 m (60 ft 9 in)
- Wingspan: 38.44 m (126 ft 2 in)
- Height: 4.6 m (15 ft 1 in)
- Wing area: 210 m^{2} (2,270 sq ft)
- Empty weight: 5,700 kg (12,540 lb)
- Gross weight: 7,960 kg (17,510 lb)
- Powerplant: 3 × Mercedes D.IVa , 190 kW (260 hp) each

Performance

- Maximum speed: 130 km/h (81 mph, 70 kn)
- Endurance: 4 hours

Armament

- 3 × 7.92-mm machine guns
- 500 kg (1,100 lb) of bombs
