= Averkiyev =

Averkiyev (Russian: Аверкиев; masculine) or Averkiyeva (Russian: Аверкиева; feminine) is a Russian last name. Variants of this last name include Averin/Averina (Аверин/Аверина) and Averyanov/Averyanova (Аверьянов/Аверьянова).

They all derive from the Russian male first name Averky (or its derivative forms Avera and Averyan), which used to be common in the past. The name supposedly derives from a Latin verb meaning to put to flight. The following people share this last name:

- Alexander Averkiyev (1980–2000), Russian private, a Hero of the Russian Federation
- Dmitry Averkiyev (1836–1905), Russian playwright and novelist
- Julia Averkieva (Yuliya Averkiyeva) (1907–1980), Soviet anthropologist and string figure collector

== See also ==
- Averkiyevo, several rural localities in Russia
