= Averin =

Averin or Averina may refer to:

- Averin (surname) (fem. Averina), a Russian last name
- Averin, common name in Scotland of Rubus chamaemorus, a rhizomatous herb
- Averina (Everina) Wollstonecraft, sister of Mary Wollstonecraft
