= Grulich S.1 =

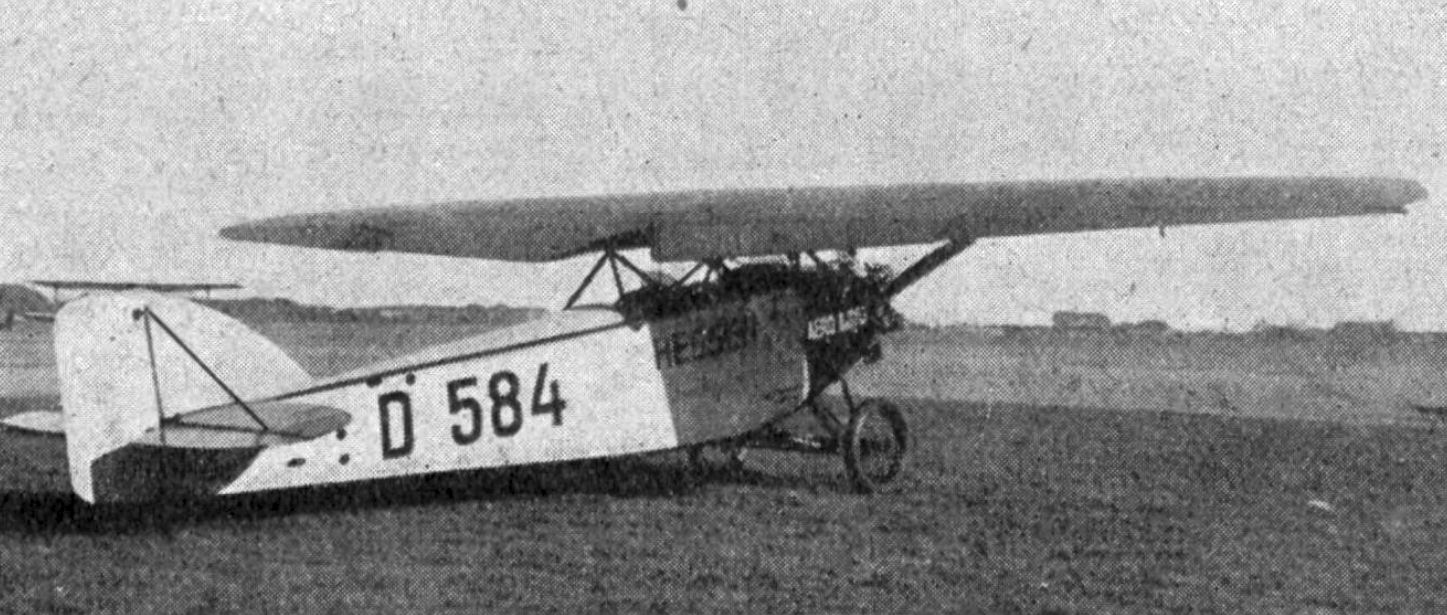

General information
- Type: Training and sports aircraft
- National origin: Germany
- Designer: Karl Grulich
- Status: 1932
- Number built: 1

History
- First flight: 1925
- Retired: Deutsche Aero-Lloyd

The Grulich S.1 was a German parasol monoplane with a cantilever wing, built in the mid 1920s. It seated two and offered a choice between two engines.

== Design and development ==
The Grulich S.1 was designed by Dr. Ing. Karl Grulich, an engineer associated with Gothaer Waggonfabrik, the company which had produced the Gotha series of bombers in World War I. Before the war he had designed and flown the Harlan monoplane and post-war was also associated with Deutsche Aero-Lloyd, a German airline that by January 1926 had merged with Junkers Luftverkehr into Deutsche Luft Hansa.

Its cantilever wing was straight-tapered, with no sweep on the leading edges, and with long, curved tips. It was built around two spars and was very thick centrally but thinned outwards; there was no dihedral on the upper surface but the thinning produced significant overall dihedral. Tapered ailerons filled about half the span. The wing was mounted over the fuselage on a cabane of four sloping metal struts to the front spar and another six to the rear.

The S.1 was designed to be powered by one of two Siemens-Halske radial engines, a seven-cylinder 60 kW (80 hp) Sh 5 or a nine-cylinder 75 kW (100 hp) Sh 6, mounted in the nose under a cowling which left the cylinders exposed for cooling. Its fuel tank was in the wing.

Behind the engine the fuselage had a tapering, rectangular section. There were two open cockpits in tandem, fitted with dual controls. Both were under the wing, though there was a small cut-out in the trailing edge over the rear position. The empennage was conventional, with a slightly rounded fin and deep rectangular rudder. A large area tailplane was mounted on top of the fuselage, with split elevators to allow rudder movement.

The S.1 had conventional, fixed landing gear. Metal V-form landing legs from each side of the lower fuselage, strut-reinforced laterally, carried a single axle attached via rubber chord shock absorbers. The mainwheels were well outboard of the V-struts, giving a track of 1.50 m (4 ft 11 in).

The exact date of the S.1's first flight is not known; it was complete by mid-1925 but may have flown earlier. It was registered as D-584 in that year, given the name Hessen and owned initially by Deutsche Aero-Lloyd. Later used by Hessiche Flugbetriebs from Darmstadt, its registration was cancelled in 1932.

== Operators ==
- Deutsche Aero-Lloyd
- Hessiche Flugbetriebs

== Specifications (Sh.5 engine) ==
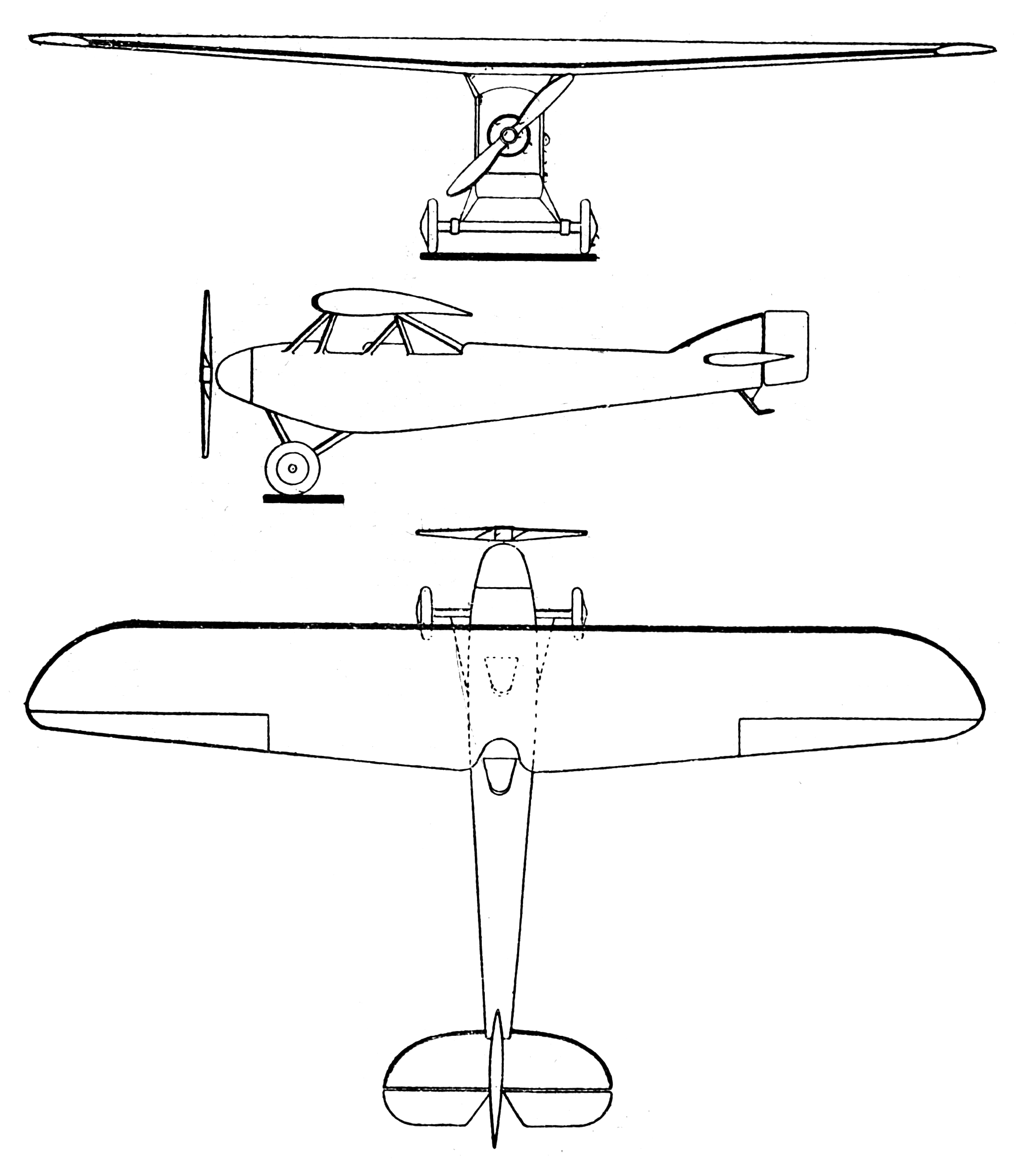
Grulich S.1 3-view drawing from Les Ailes June 17, 1926

Data from Les Ailes. June 1926

General characteristics

- Crew: one
- Capacity: one passenger
- Length: 7.75 m (25 ft 5 in)
- Wingspan: 12.0 m (39 ft 4 in)
- Height: 2.46 m (8 ft 1 in)
- Wing area: 19 m^{2} (200 sq ft)
- Empty weight: 550 kg (1,213 lb)
- Gross weight: 800 kg (1,764 lb)
- Powerplant: 1 × Siemens-Halske Sh 5 7-cylinder radial, 60 kW (80 hp) at 1,500 rpm
- Propellers: 2-bladed

Performance

- Maximum speed: 140 km/h (87 mph, 76 kn)
- Stall speed: 70 km/h (43 mph, 38 kn) minimum speed
- Range: 500 km (310 mi, 270 nmi)
- Service ceiling: 3,000 m (9,800 ft)
- Time to altitude: 12 min to 1,000 m (3,300 ft)
- Take-off distance: 135 m (443 ft)
- Landing distance: 100 m (330 ft)
