= Averyanovka =

Averyanovka (Russian: Аверьяновка) is the name of several rural localities in Russia.

== Modern localities ==
- Averyanovka, Republic of Dagestan, a selo in Averyanovsky Selsoviet of Kizlyarsky District in the Republic of Dagestan; 43°51′N 46°46′E
- Averyanovka, Irkutsk Oblast, a village in Tulunsky District of Irkutsk Oblast
- Averyanovka, Kostroma Oblast, a settlement in Sukhoverkhovskoye Settlement of Kologrivsky District in Kostroma Oblast; 58°7′N 44°21′E
- Averyanovka, Samara Oblast, a selo in Bogatovsky District of Samara Oblast

== Alternative names ==
- Averyanovka, alternative name of stantsii Averyanovka, a settlement in Novovostochnaya Rural Territory of Tyazhinsky District in Kemerovo Oblast; 56°10′N 88°18′E
