= Dietrich DP.II =

Dietrich DP.II Bussard
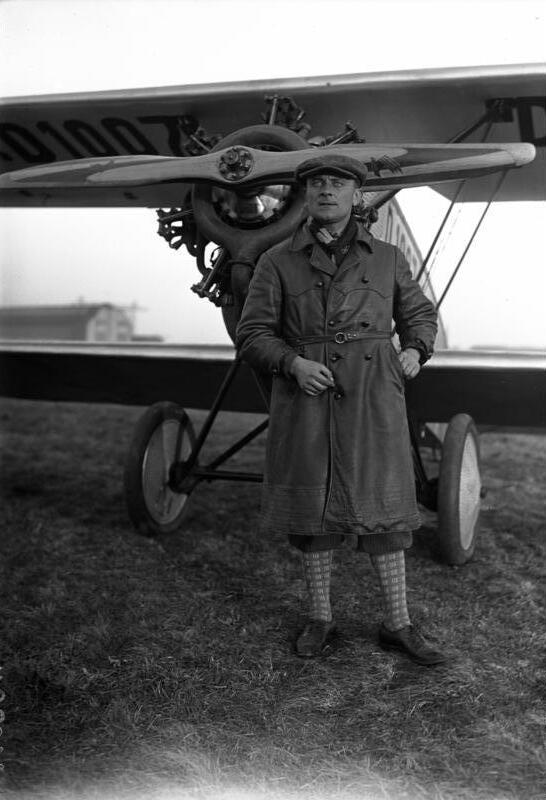

General information
- Type: two-seat training biplane
- National origin: Germany
- Manufacturer: Dietrich-Gobiet Flugzeugwerke
- Designer: Richard Dietrich
- Number built: 54

History
- First flight: 1920s

The Dietrich DP.II Bussard was a 1920s German two-seat training biplane designed by Richard Dietrich and built by the Dietrich-Gobiet Flugzeugwerke as Kassel.

== Development ==
The DP.II was a development of the earlier DP.I with the change to be a cantilever unequal-span biplane. The DP.II was built with wooden wings and a steel-frame fabric covered fuselage and tailplane. The aircraft had a fixed tailskid landing gear and was powered by a Siemens-Halske radial engine. Following the single Siemens-Halske Sh 4 powered prototype was a production run of 58 improved DP.IIa variants powered by Siemens-Halske Sh 5 radial engines.

== Variants ==
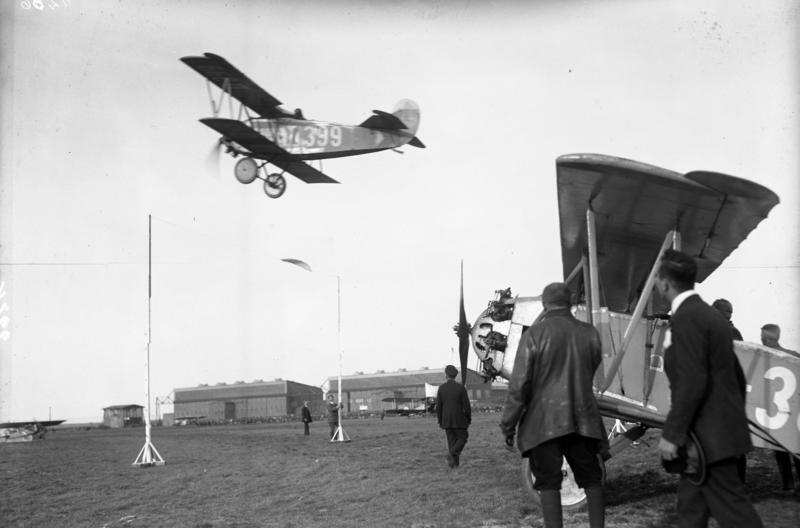
DP.IIa in 1925

DP.II
Prototype with a Siemens-Halske Sh 4 radial engine, one built.
DP.IIa
Production variant with a Siemens-Halske Sh 5 radial engine, 53 built.

== Specifications (DP.IIa) ==
Data from

General characteristics

- Crew: 2
- Length: 5.97 m (19 ft 7 in)
- Wingspan: 7.60 m (24 ft 11 in)
- Height: 2.43 m (8 ft 0 in)
- Empty weight: 340 kg (750 lb)
- Max takeoff weight: 560 kg (1,235 lb)
- Powerplant: 1 × Siemens-Halske Sh 5 seven-cylinder, air-cooled, radial engine, 41 kW (55 hp)

Performance

- Maximum speed: 145 km/h (90 mph, 78 kn)
- Range: 500 km (310 mi, 270 nmi)
- Service ceiling: 3,800 m (12,500 ft)
