= Siemens-Schuckert =

Defunct aircraft manufacturer of Germany

Siemens-Schuckertwerke
- Type: Rail Transport
- Industry: electrical industry
- Predecessor: Isaria Zählerwerke; Schuckert & Co.
- Founded: 1903; 123 years ago
- Successor: Siemens Mobility
- Headquarters: Munich, Germany
- Area served: Worldwide
- Products: Rail Types
- Parent: Siemens

Siemens-Schuckert (or Siemens-Schuckertwerke) was a German electrical engineering company headquartered in Berlin, Erlangen and Nuremberg that was incorporated into Siemens AG in 1966.

Siemens Schuckert was founded in 1903 when Siemens & Halske acquired Schuckertwerke. Subsequently, Siemens & Halske specialized in communications engineering and Siemens-Schuckert in power engineering and pneumatic instrumentation. During World War I Siemens-Schuckert also produced aircraft. It took over manufacturing of the Protos vehicles in 1908. In World War II, the company had a factory producing aircraft and other parts at Monowitz near Auschwitz. There was a workers' camp near the factory known as Bobrek concentration camp.

The Siemens Schuckert logo consisted of an S with a smaller S superimposed on the middle with the smaller S rotated left by 45 degrees. (Note: Siemens used this as a theme for their logos with absorbed companies: Siemens & Halske's logo was a large S with a small superimposed and rotated H. Others were Siemens-Apparate- und Maschinenbau (A), Siemens-Bauunion (B), Siemens-Planiawerke (P) and Siemens-Reiniger (R)) The logo was used into the late 1960s, when both companies merged with Siemens-Reiniger-Werke AG to form the present-day Siemens AG.

== Train ==
Siemens-Schuckert produced various railways:

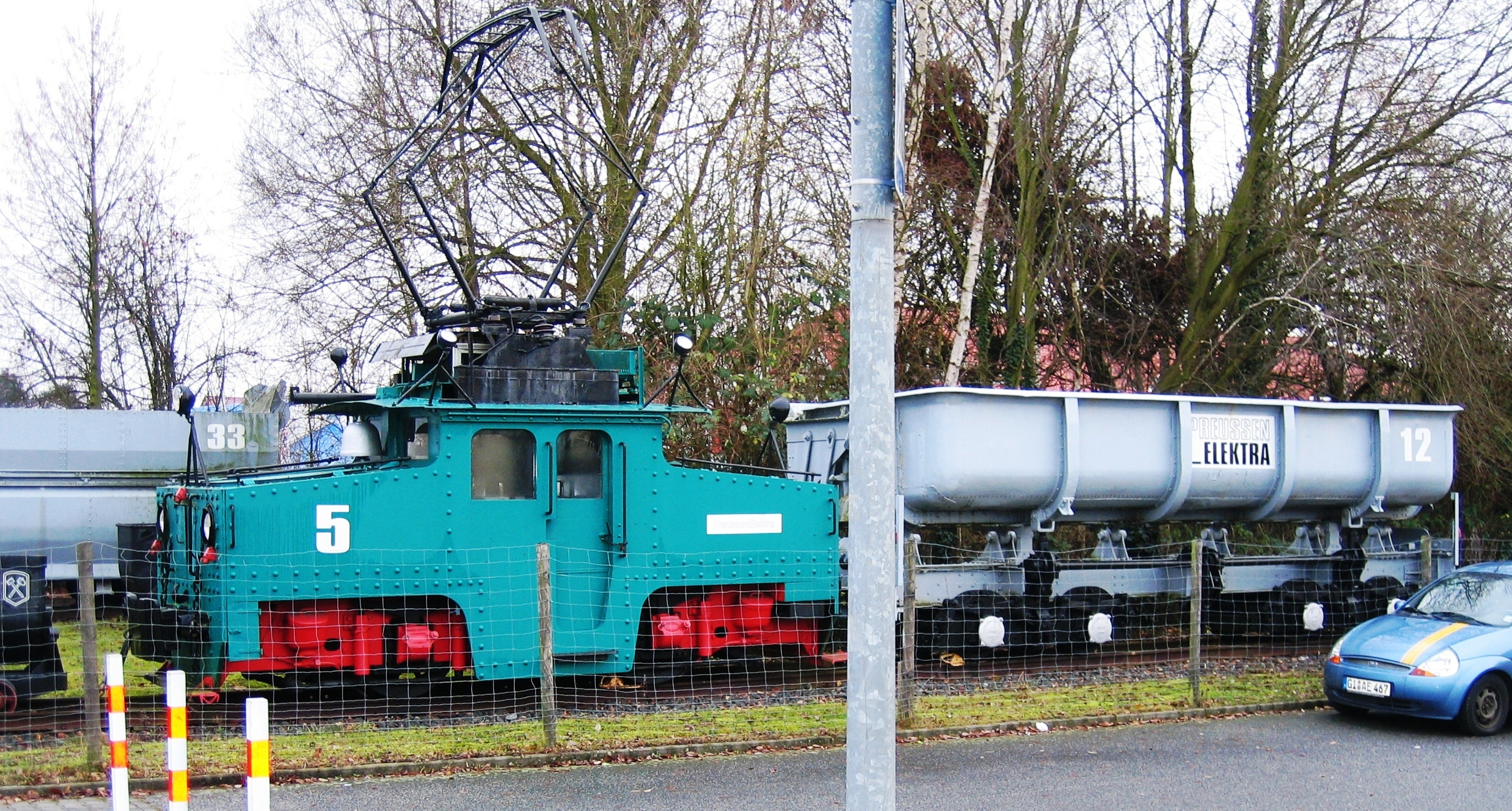
Ash train in Wölfersheim (Germany)

Siemens - Schuckert factory railway nameplate made of brass, probably c. 1934

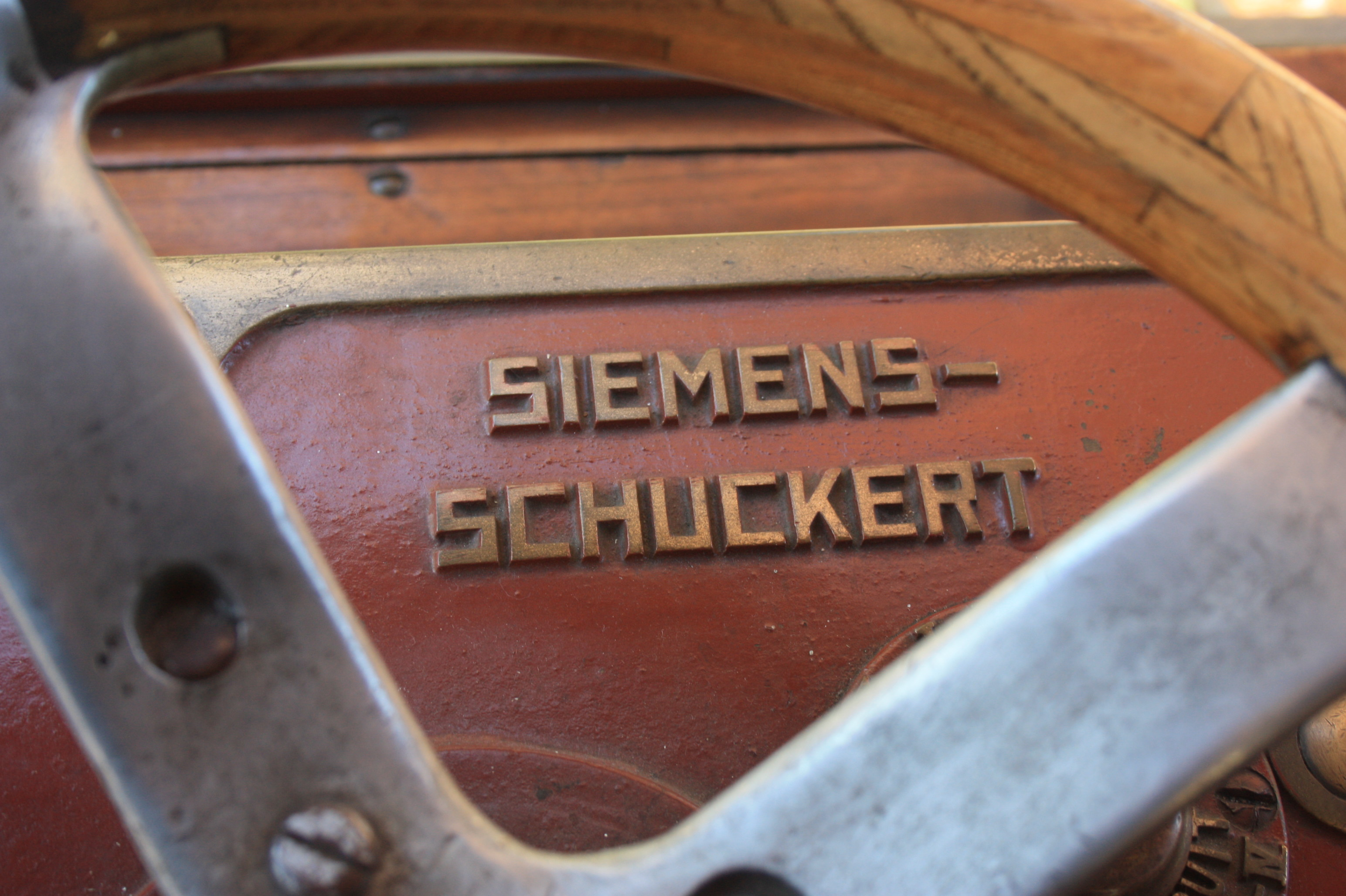
Siemens-Schuckert name on a tram speed controller

== Automobile ==
From 1906 to 1910, the company also produced electric automobiles. The Type B (1906–1908) was a four-seater car, available as a Victoria, limousine, landaulet or omnibus.

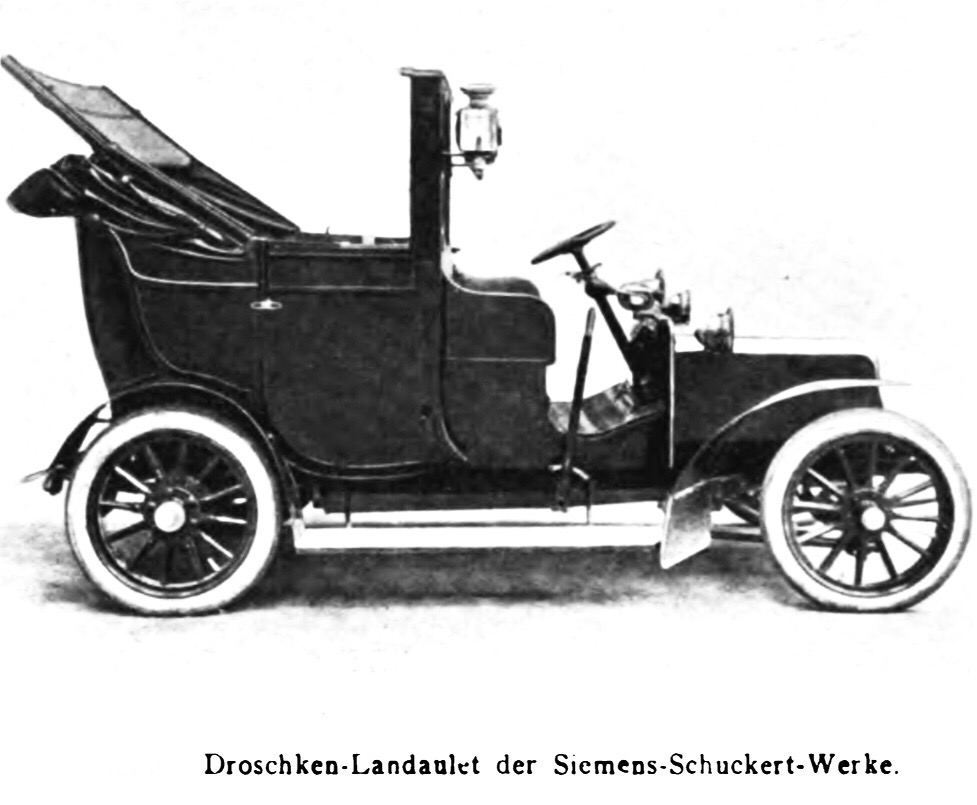
Siemens-Schuckert Typ B Landaulet (1906–1908)

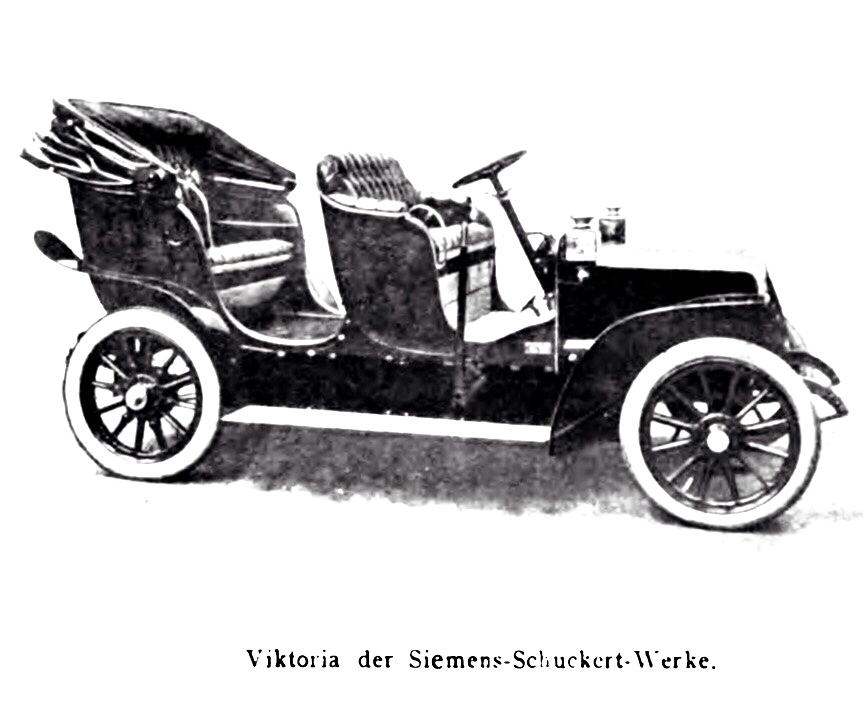
Siemens-Schuckert Typ B Viktoria (1906–1908)

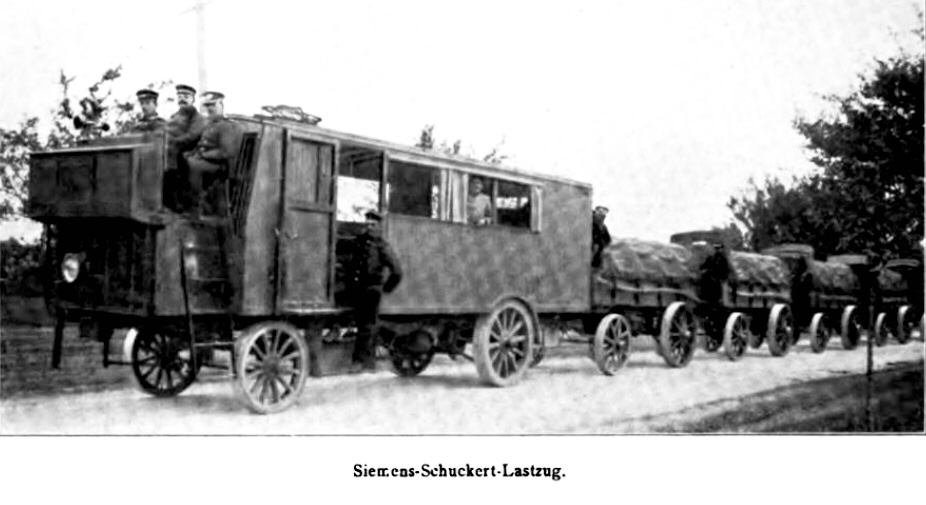
Siemens-Schuckert truck (1908)

== Aircraft ==
Siemens-Schuckert built a number of designs in World War I and inter-war era. They also produced aircraft engines under the Siemens-Halske brand, which evolved into their major product line after the end of World War I. The company reorganized as Brandenburgische Motorenwerke, or simply Bramo, in 1936, and were later purchased in 1939 by BMW to become BMW Flugmotorenbau.

=== World War I ===
Siemens-Schuckert designed a number of heavy bombers early in World War I, building a run of seven Riesenflugzeug. Intended to be used in the strategic role in long duration flights, the SSW R-series had three 150 h.p Benz Bz.III engines in the cabin driving two propellers connected to a common gear-box through a combination leather-cone and centrifugal-key clutch in SSW R.I to the SSW R.VII models (the SSW R.VIII utilized four engines). In the case of engine failure, which was extremely common at the time, the bomber could continue flying on two engines while the third was repaired by the in-flight mechanic. Two transmission shafts transferred the power from the gear-box to propeller gear-boxes mounted on the wing struts. Although there were some problems with the clutch system, the gear-box proved to be reliable when properly maintained. The SSW R.1 through the SSW R.VII designs were noted for their distinctive forked fuselage. Several of these aircraft (SSW R.V through the SSW R.VII) fought on the Eastern Front. Although interesting in concept, the cost of these and the R-types from other companies was so great that the air force eventually abandoned the concept until more practical designs arrived later in the war.

The first fighter designed at the works was the Siemens-Schuckert E.I which appeared in mid 1915, and which was the first aircraft to be powered by the Siemens-Halske Sh.I, a new rotary, developed by Siemens-Schuckert, in which the cylinders and the crankshaft rotated in opposite directions. A small number of production machines were supplied to various Feldflieger Abteilung to supplement supplies of the Fokker and Pfalz monoplane fighters used at the time mainly for escort work. The prototype SSW E.II, powered by the inline Argus AsII, crashed in June 1916, killing Franz Steffen, one of the designers of the SSW R types. By early 1916 the first generation of German monoplane fighters were outclassed by the Nieuport 11 and the Nieuport 17 which very quickly followed it; and Siemens-Schuckert were supplied with a captured Nieuport 17 to "study". The resulting SSW D.I was powered by the Siemens-Halske Sh.I, but was otherwise a fairly literal copy of the Nieuport 17. This aircraft was the first Siemens-Schuckert fighter to be ordered in quantity, but by the time it became available in numbers (well into 1917) it was outclassed by contemporary Albatros fighters.

Development of the Sh.I engine resulted in the eleven-cylinder, 160 hp Sh.III, perhaps one of the most advanced rotary engine designs of the war. The D.I fighter also formed the basis for a series of original designs, which by the end of 1917 had reached a peak in the Siemens-Schuckert D.III, which went into limited production in early 1918, and found use in home defense units as an interceptor, due to its outstanding rate of climb. Further modifications improved its handling and performance to produce the Siemens-Schuckert D.IV. Several offshoots of the design included triplanes and a parasol monoplane, but none saw production.

=== Interwar production ===
With the end of the war production of the D.IV continued, mainly for sales to Switzerland who flew them into the late 1920s. With the signing of the Treaty of Versailles the next year all aircraft production in Germany was shut down. Siemens-Schuckert immediately disappeared, but Siemens-Halske continued sales of the Sh.III and started development of smaller engines for the civilian market. By the mid-1920s their rotary engines were no longer in vogue, but "non-turning" versions of the same basic mechanicals led to a series of 7-cylinder radial engines, the Sh.10 through Sh.14A, delivering up to 150 hp in the 14A. The Sh.14A became a best-seller in the trainer market, and over 15,000 of all the versions were eventually built.

Siemens-Halske no longer had any competitive engines for the larger end of the market, and to address this they negotiated a license in 1929 to produce the 9-cylinder Bristol Jupiter IV. Minor changes for the German market led to the Sh.20 and Sh.21. Following the evolution of their smaller Sh.14's, the engine was then bored out to produce the 900 hp design, the Sh.22. In 1933 new engine naming was introduced by the RLM, and this design became the Sh.322, when Siemens was given the 300-block of numbers. The Sh.322 design had reliability problems and never became popular.

== Nazi period ==
=== Bramo ===
The company reorganized as Bramo in 1936, and continued development of what was now their own large engine. Modifying the Sh.322 with the addition of fuel injection and a new supercharger led to the Bramo 323 Fafnir, which entered production in 1937. Although rather outdated in terms of design, by this time the engine had matured into a highly reliable powerplant despite its comparatively poor fuel economy, and 5,500 were produced until the lines shut down in 1944.

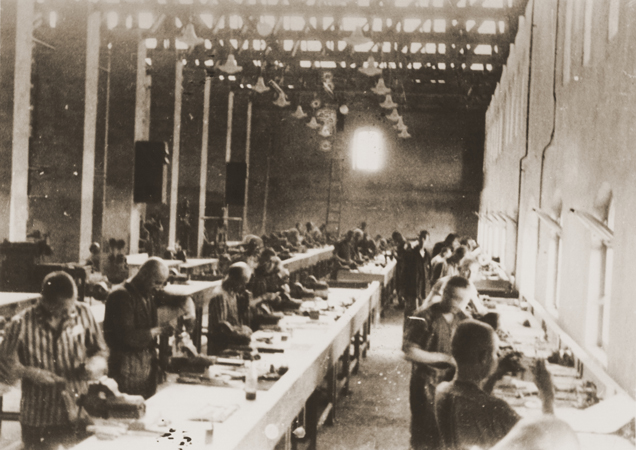
Prisoners producing aircraft parts in the Siemens-Schuckert factory at Bobrek (c. 1944)

In design terms the Bramo 323 was basically a dead-end with little growth potential. By the start of the war its 1,000 hp was already at the low end of the performance scale, and use was limited to transports and bombers. In order to build a 1,100 kW (1,500 hp)-class engine Bramo started development of a two-row version of the engine as the Bramo 329, mirroring similar developments at BMW who were trying to scale up the Pratt & Whitney Hornet they were building under license into the two-row BMW 139. Design of both engines was well advanced in 1939 when BMW bought Bramo, and cancelled work on the 329 to concentrate on what would become the BMW 801.

Bramo engineers had also started developing axial-flow jet engines in 1938. They were awarded a development contract to continue work on two designs, which would later become the 109-002 and 109-003 when the RLM officially started supporting jet development. The -002 used an advanced contra-rotating compressor for added efficiency, while the -003 used a simpler compressor/stator system similar to those in use in modern designs. The -002 proved to be too complex and work on it soon ended, but the -003 showed definite promise and eventually became the BMW 003.

=== Monowitz ===
The company had a work camp near Monowitz producing parts for aircraft, known as Bobrek concentration camp. It employed ostarbeiter slave workers as well as Auschwitz prisoners. The main factory to which Brobrek was attached was a site designed to make synthetic rubber and gasoline, and it was owned by IG Farben, one of the largest chemical combines in Germany during the war. It was one of numerous Auschwitz sub-camps established by large German companies to supply armaments to the armed forces, and other companies included Krupp, Rheinmetall and AEG. All of these made artillery, as well as parts for aircraft and U-boats, and small arms such as pistols and machine guns.

== List of products ==
=== Aircraft ===
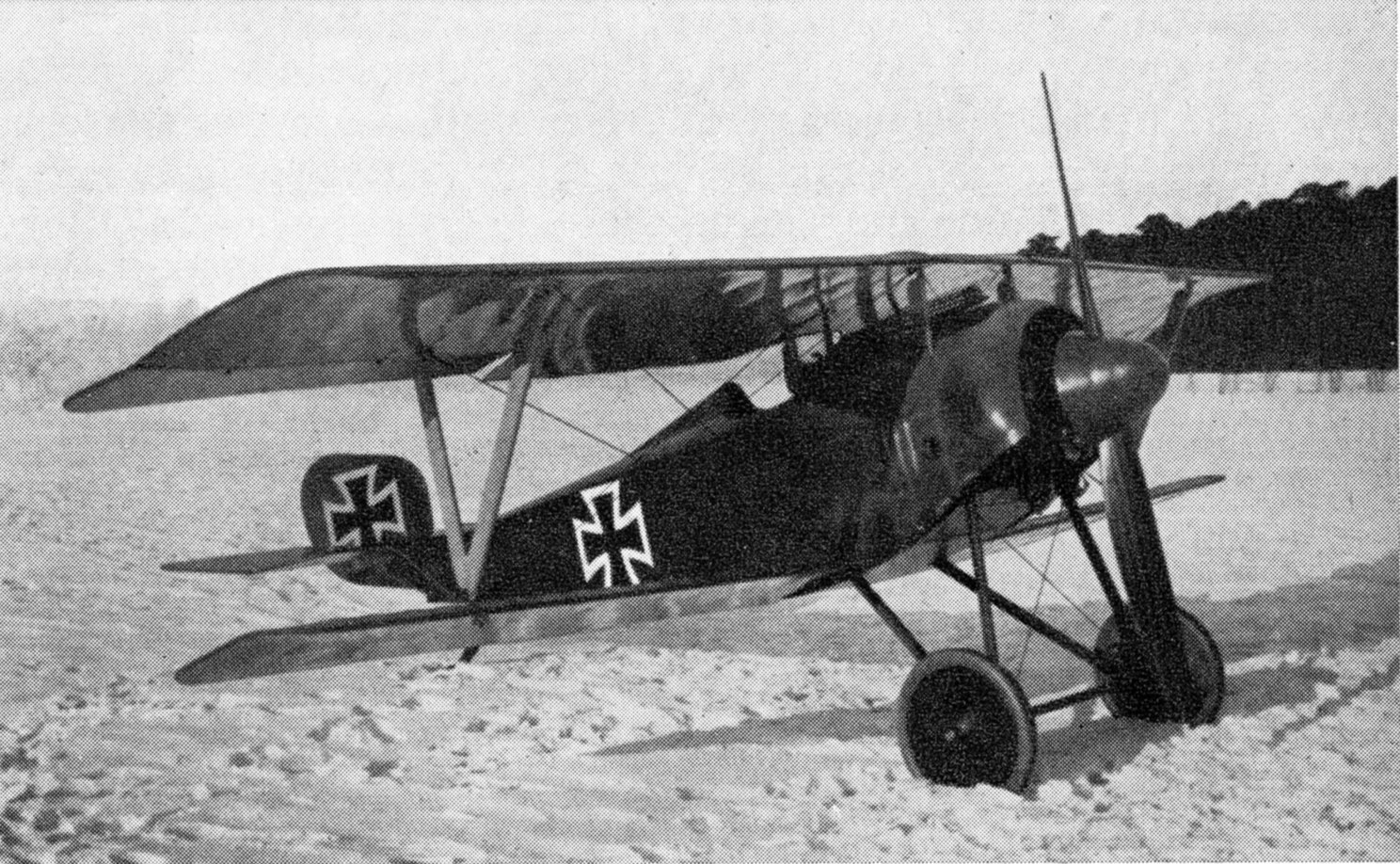
Siemens-Schuckert D.I

- Siemens-Schuckert D.I
- Siemens-Schuckert D.II
- Siemens-Schuckert D.III

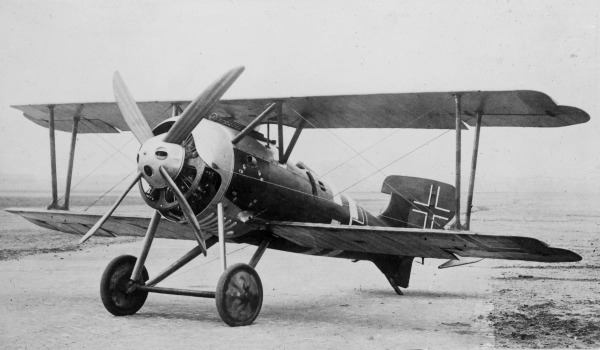
Siemens-Schuckert D.IV

- Siemens-Schuckert D.IV
- Siemens-Schuckert D.VI
- Siemens-Schuckert Dr.II
- Siemens-Schuckert DDr.I
- Siemens-Schuckert E.I

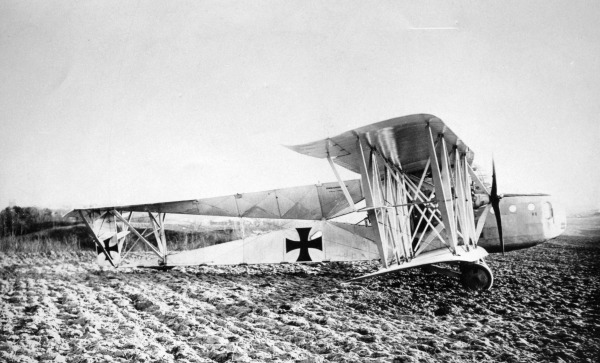
Siemens-Schuckert R.VI

- Siemens-Schuckert R.I
- Siemens-Schuckert R.II
- Siemens-Schuckert R.III
- Siemens-Schuckert R.IV
- Siemens-Schuckert R.V
- Siemens-Schuckert R.VI
- Siemens-Schuckert R.VII
- Siemens-Schuckert R.VIII
- Siemens-Schuckert Forssman

=== Engines ===
- Siemens-Halske Sh.I
- Siemens-Halske Sh.II
- Siemens-Halske Sh.III
- Siemens-Halske Sh 4
- Siemens-Halske Sh 5
- Siemens-Halske Sh 6
- Siemens-Halske Sh 11
- Siemens-Halske Sh 12
- Siemens-Halske Sh 13
- Siemens-Halske Sh 14
- Siemens-Halske Sh 15
- Siemens-Bramo Sh 20
- Siemens-Bramo Sh 21
- Siemens Bramo SAM 22B
- Siemens Bramo 314
- Siemens Bramo 322
- Siemens Bramo 323 Fafnir
- Siemens Bramo 109-003

=== Trains ===
- Siemens-Schuckert Orenstein & Koppel
