= Siemens-Schuckert Forssman =

Forssman
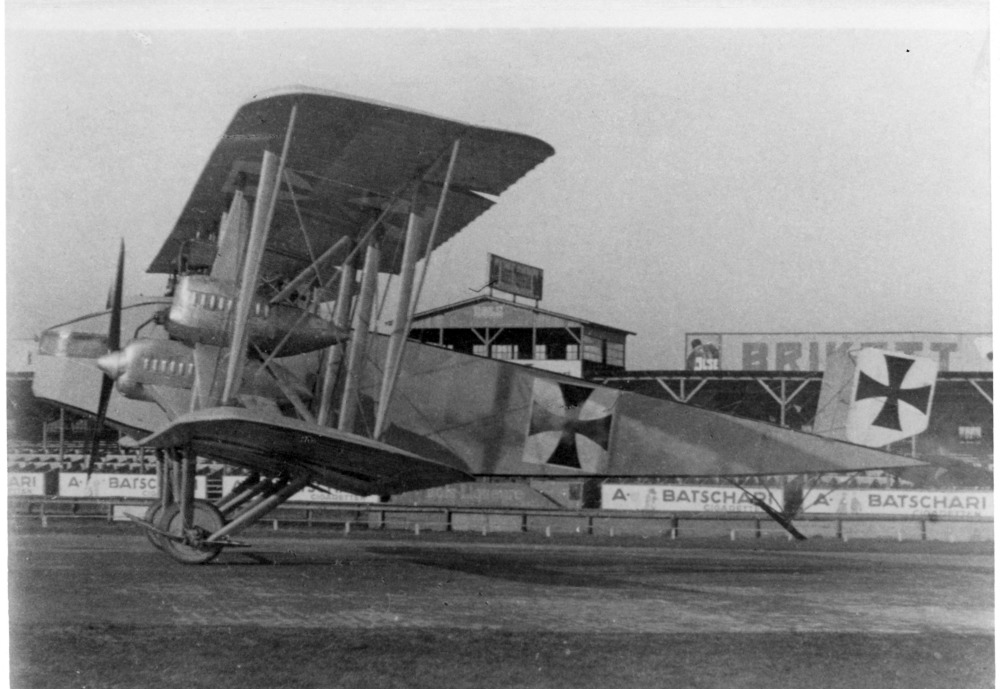

General information
- Type: Bomber
- National origin: Germany
- Manufacturer: Siemens-Schuckert
- Designer: Villehad Forssman
- Primary user: Luftstreitkräfte
- Number built: 1

History
- First flight: Spring 1915

The Siemens-Schuckert Forssman was a prototype bomber aircraft designed and built in Germany in 1914 and 1915. When its performance proved inadequate for its intended role, even after numerous modifications, the German Inspectorate of Flying Troops (the Idflieg) eventually accepted it into service as a trainer. Shortly after its acceptance into military service, the aircraft's fuselage fractured while on the ground, ending its career.

The aircraft is sometimes known as the Siemens-Schuckert Forssman R, the "R" alluding to the designation that the Idflieg assigned to multi-engine aircraft in late 1915. However, the Forssman did not meet all the criteria of the "R" designation — for example, its engines were not serviceable in flight — and the "R" designation only came into use after the Forssman was built. If the Forssman received any military designation at all, that designation is not now known.

== Design and development ==
The Forssman was a large, four-engined, three-bay biplane with an extensively glazed, fully enclosed cabin. The wings were unstaggered and of uneven span, and the undercarriage consisted of two mainwheels carried on a common axle, plus a tailskid. The tail was of conventional layout with a single fin. Power was supplied by 110 hp (82 kW) Mercedes D.III engines mounted on short struts on the lower mainplane. The design bore such a strong resemblance to the contemporary Sikorsky Ilya Muromets bombers produced in Russia that Jane's Encyclopedia of Aviation describes it as "virtually a copy" of that aircraft, and in their book on German multi-engine types of World War I, Haddow and Grosz comment that designer Villehad Forssman "was content to copy the Sikorsky configuration almost line-for-line".

Construction commenced in October 1914, and was completed by spring 1915. Early test flights, probably limited to short hops, revealed multiple shortcomings in the design. As originally completed, the wings were braced between the second and third cell by only a single strut. Reinforcements to the wings added a second strut aft of this position, together with a set of diagonal struts to support the overhang of the upper wings Other modifications at this time included rigging the wings with a slight dihedral to improve lateral stability, adding a second tailfin and rudder to improve control, and grafting an open gun position onto the front of the fuselage to improve the aircraft's centre of gravity.

Even with these modifications in place, the Forssman could not fulfil the Idflieg's acceptance criteria, and Villehad Forssman severed his connections with Siemens-Schuckert owing to the failure of his design. With Siemens-Schuckert still eager to recoup its investment in the design, the firm assigned Harald Wolff to improve the aircraft. Wolff deleted the tacked-on pulpit from the nose and redesigned the forward fuselage to taper to a sharp point, surmounted by a teardrop-shaped cupola for the pilot. The redesign also replaced the two inner D.III engines with more powerful Mercedes D.IVa engines mounted on faired struts. The outer engines remained unchanged, but were moved from their original position to mountings on faired struts midway in the interplane gap, to improve propeller efficiency. Gun positions were added in the nose and in dorsal and ventral locations in the fuselage, although all these positions remained faired-over during testing and there is no evidence that armament was ever fitted. In September 1915, and after another pilot had refused to fly the aircraft following some ground tests, Lt Walter Höndorf agreed to test the redesigned Forssman. After a one or two hops, the aircraft turned over on its nose while alighting. The nose was crushed, and the leading-edge spar in the upper wing was fractured.

Despite all setbacks, Siemens-Schuckert still wanted to sell the aircraft, and commenced another rebuild. The nose was redesigned again, into a rounded, blunt configuration with a gun position atop. The pilot's position was relocated either behind the nose windows or to an open cockpit on top of the fuselage. By now, the aircraft had acquired the nickname Ladenhüter (literally, "shelf warmer" or, idiomatically, "white elephant") and pilots refused to fly it. Siemens-Schuckert director Walter Reichel negotiated a price discount for the Idflieg if they would accept the aircraft to a lower specification. The Idflieg accepted, and reduced the acceptance criteria to the aircraft reaching 2,000 m (6,562 ft) in 30 minutes while carrying a useful load of 1,000 kg (2,205 lb) and enough fuel for an endurance of 4 hours. Reichel now offered Bruno and Franz Steffen ten percent of the sale price if they could perform an acceptance flight to meet the Idflieg's requirements. The Steffen brothers examined the Forssman and Bruno agreed to make the flight, against the recommendations of friends and associates. Franz's calculations based on the construction drawings showed the aircraft safe to fly, although the fuselage to be structurally weak immediately aft of the wings.

After a successful 300-metre (984 ft) hop, Bruno Steffen planned to fly the Forssman on its acceptance flight with four passengers aboard, as he had for his own R.I design. However, everyone whom he invited declined, including the members of the Idflieg acceptance committee, and so he made the flight alone. Carrying the required 1,000-kilogram payload, Steffen reached 2,000 metres in 28 minutes, and then climbed another 100 metres (328 ft) before returning to the ground. While descending, one engine failed, followed shortly by the other three. Nevertheless, Steffen made a safe landing and the acceptance criteria were verified.

Although now obsolescent, the Idflieg accepted the Forssman into service in April 1916 as a trainer. Further development of the design was halted, although the aircraft's ballast was moved to counter tail heaviness that Steffen encountered on the acceptance flight. Shortly after acceptance, the aircraft's fuselage fractured just aft of the wings, due to engine vibrations while running the engines on the ground. The Forssman was dismantled at that point, and Bruno Steffen expressed relief at the news, as the aircraft would not be able to endanger other lives.

== Specifications (as modified in late 1915) ==
Data from Gray & Thetford 1962, p.571

General characteristics

- Crew: 4+
- Length: 16.5 m (54 ft 1.75 in)
- Wingspan: 24 m (78 ft 9 in)
- Wing area: 140 m^{2} (1,512 sq ft)
- Empty weight: 4,000 kg (8,800 lb)
- Gross weight: 5,200 kg (11,400 lb)
- Powerplant: 2 × Mercedes D.III , 82 kW (110 hp) each
- Powerplant: 2 × Mercedes D.IVa , 164 kW (220 hp) each

Performance

- Maximum speed: 120 km/h (75 mph, 65 kn)
- Maximum glide ratio: 38.5
- Rate of climb: 1.15 m/s (226 ft/min)
