= Albatros L 60 =

L 60

General information
- Type: Utility aircraft
- Manufacturer: Albatros Flugzeugwerke

History
- Manufactured: 3
- First flight: 1923

The Albatros L 60 was a two-seat German utility aircraft of the 1920s developed from the Albatros L 59. It was a single-engine low-wing cantilever monoplane with large, spatted undercarriage.

== Specifications (L 60) ==
General characteristics

- Crew: one pilot
- Capacity: 1 passenger
- Length: 5.40 m (17 ft 9 in)
- Wingspan: 10.30 m (33 ft 9 in)
- Height: 2.65 m (8 ft 8 in)
- Wing area: 10.0 m^{2} (108 sq ft)
- Empty weight: 369 kg (814 lb)
- Gross weight: 600 kg (1,323 lb)
- Powerplant: 1 × Siemens-Halske Sh 5 , 60 kW (80 hp)

Performance

- Maximum speed: 165 km/h (100 mph, 87 kn)
- Range: 400 km (250 mi, 220 nmi)
- Service ceiling: 3,000 m (9,800 ft)
- Rate of climb: 2.1 m/s (410 ft/min)
