= Averin (surname) =

Averin (Russian: Аверин; masculine) or Averina (Аверина; feminine) is a Russian last name, a variant of Averkiyev. The following people share this last name:

- Aleksandr Averin (disambiguation), several people
- Andrey Averin, resident of Comedy Club, a Russian stand-up comedy TV show
- Arina Averina and Dina Averina (both b. 1998), twin sisters, Russian rhythmic gymnasts
- Egor Averin (Yegor Averin) (b. 1989), Russian ice hockey player
- Joyce Helena Averina, 1987 British Empire Medal recipient
- Konstantin Averin, Kazakhstani gymnast participating in the Men's Pair event at the 2010 Acrobatic Gymnastics World Championships
- Maksym Averin, Ukrainian cyclist, member of the Azerbaijani Synergy Baku Cycling Project cycling team
- Maxim Averin, actor playing Shidla in the 2006 Russian science fiction movie Asiris Nuna
- Mikhail Averin, Soviet pilot claiming to be the assailant of George Andrew Davis Jr., US World War II flying ace
- Natalya Averina, Miss World 2010 contestant representing Denmark
- Oleksandr Averin, Ukrainian cross-country skiing trainer of the Turkish team at the 2006 Winter Olympics
- Tatyana Averina (1950–2001), Soviet/Russian Olympic speed skater
- Vasiliy Averin, head of the Yekaterinoslav Bolshevik Uprising in 1918 and of the executive committee of Volhynian Governorate in 1920
- Viktor Averin, Russian criminal who, together with Sergey Mikhaylov, founded the Solntsevo criminal group
- Yury Averin, actor who played Muller in the 1959 Soviet movie Destiny of a Man
