= Pavel Averyanov =

Russian footballer

Personal information
- Full name: Pavel Aleksandrovich Averyanov
- Date of birth: 22 December 1984 (age 41)
- Place of birth: Voronezh, Russian SFSR
- Height: 1.73 m (5 ft 8 in)
- Positions: Midfielder; forward

Senior career*
Years	Team	Apps	(Gls)
2001	FC Fakel Voronezh (reserves)		
2002	FC Arsenal Tula	0	(0)
2002–2004	FC Fakel Voronezh	5	(0)
2005	FC Dynamo Voronezh (D4)		
2006–2007	FC Dynamo Voronezh	56	(4)
2008	FC FCS-73 Voronezh	21	(2)
2009	FC Fakel-Voronezh Voronezh	12	(0)
- * Club domestic league appearances and goals

Pavel Aleksandrovich Averyanov (Russian: Павел Александрович Аверьянов; born 22 December 1984) is a former Russian professional football player.

== Club career ==
He played in the Russian Football National League for FC Fakel Voronezh in 2002 and 2003.
