= Aleksandr Averyanov =

Aleksandr Averyanov may refer to:

- Aleksandr Averyanov (footballer, born 1948) (1948–2021), Soviet and Russian football player and coach
- Aleksandr Averyanov (footballer, born 1969), Russian football player
