= Siemens-Halske Sh 5 =

Sh 5
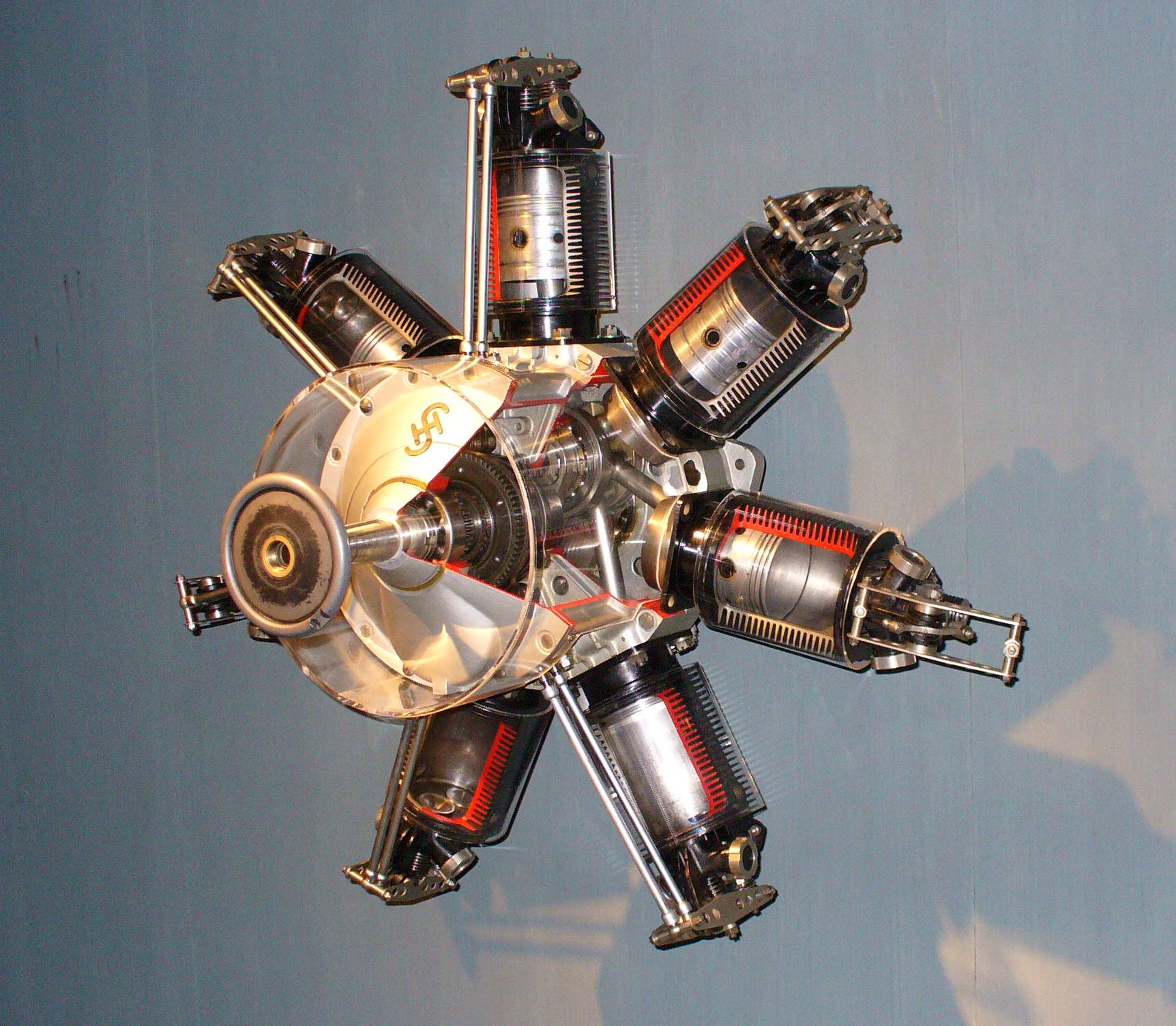
- Siemens-Halske Sh 5 (partially sectioned)
- Type: Radial engine
- Manufacturer: Siemens-Halske
- First run: 1921

The Siemens-Halske Sh 5 was a seven-cylinder, air-cooled, radial engine for aircraft built in Germany in the 1920s. First run in 1921, it was rated at 60 kW (80 hp).

== Applications ==
- Albatros L 60
- Dietrich DP.IIa
- Grulich S.1
- Junkers K 16
- Udet U 5

== Specifications ==
=== General characteristics ===
- Type: 7-cylinder radial engine
- Bore: 100 mm (3.9 in)
- Stroke: 120 mm (4.7 in)
- Displacement: 6.6 L (400 cu in)
- Length: 1,000 mm (39 in)
- Width: 1,000 mm (39 in)
- Height: 810 mm (32 in)

=== Components ===
- Cooling system: Air-cooled

=== Performance ===
- Power output: 60 kW (80 hp)
- Compression ratio: 4.7:1

== See also ==
Related lists

- List of aircraft engines
