= Siemens-Schuckert R.III =

R.III

General information
- Type: Bomber
- National origin: Germany
- Manufacturer: Siemens-Schuckert
- Designer: Bruno and Franz Steffen
- Number built: 1

History
- First flight: late 1915
- Developed from: Siemens-Schuckert R.I

The Siemens-Schuckert R.III was a prototype bomber aircraft built by Germany during World War I. It was one of six aircraft based on the Siemens-Schuckert R.I that were originally intended to be identical, but which each developed in a different direction and were designated as different aircraft types by the German Inspectorate of Flying Troops (the Idflieg). The aircraft's development was impeded by the unreliability of its Maybach HS engines, and when it was eventually accepted for military service, it was only in a training role.

As designed, the R.III was a large three-bay biplane with unstaggered wings of unequal span and a fully enclosed cabin. Power was to be supplied by three 180-kW (240-hp) Maybach HS engines mounted internally in the fuselage, which transmitted their power via driveshafts to two propellers mounted tractor-fashion on the interplane struts nearest the fuselage. The main undercarriage consisted of divided units, each of which carried dual wheels, and the tail was supported by a pair of tailwheels. The fuselage was forked into an upper and lower section, which allowed a clear field of fire to the rear of the aircraft.

The R.III was delivered to Döberitz for military service on 30 December 1915. Problems with the engines began almost immediately, and numerous modifications to the engines and their cooling systems were carried out in the field. Despite the modifications, engine problems were probably responsible when the R.III crashed in early 1916. New wings were fitted to the aircraft to replace those damaged in the crash, but further attempts to fly the R.III were again hampered by its engines, and the aircraft was returned to Siemens-Schuckert. In June, the firm requested permission from the Idflieg to replace the troublesome engines with Benz Bz.IV engines, but was told to place the R.III in storage instead.

Work on the R.III commenced again in October 1916, when a number of improvements based on field experience with the R.V and R.VI were incorporated into the aircraft. These included: reinforcement of the tail, engine and gearbox thermometers, lighting in the engine room, and covers for the radiators that could be extended in flight. The wing was extended both in span and in chord. By this time, the Idflieg had relaxed its specifications for the R-types ordered from Siemens-Schuckert, and with the Benz engines fitted, the R.III was able to meet the lowered standard. Siemens-Schuckert delivered the refurbished aircraft to Riesenflugzeugersatzabteilung (Rea — "giant aircraft support unit") on 12 December 1916 and it was accepted into service on 21 December. In its modified form, the aircraft was of no use on the front line, but was used for training instead, a role in which it was still serving in February 1918.

The Siemens-Schuckert R.II to R.VII were ordered in the G (Grossflugzeug - large aircraft) series and given serial numbers G.32/15 to G.37/15 respectively. These serials were changed on 13 July 1915 to G.33/15 - G.38/15, for unknown reasons and again on 6 November 1915 to R.2/15 - R.7/15 in the R (Riesenflugzeug - giant aircraft) series, adopting the R.II to R.VII designations.

== Specifications ==
Data from Kroschel & Stützer 1994, p.141

General characteristics

- Crew: 4
- Length: 17.7 m (58 ft 1 in)
- Wingspan: 34.33 m (112 ft 8 in)
- Height: 4.6 m (15 ft 8 in)
- Wing area: 177 m^{2} (1,910 sq ft)
- Empty weight: 5,400 kg (11,900 lb)
- Gross weight: 6,820 kg (15,000 lb)
- Powerplant: 3 × Benz Bz.IV , 150 kW (200 hp) each

Performance

- Maximum speed: 132 km/h (83 mph, 72 kn)
- Range: 480 km (300 mi, 260 nmi)
- Service ceiling: 3,000 m (9,800 ft)

Armament

- 3 × 7.9-mm machine guns
- 500 kg of bombs
