= Prudy, Vladimir Oblast =

Prudy Пруды
- Village
- Location within Vladimir Oblast Location within Russia
- Coordinates: 56°22′N 40°40′E
- Country: Russia
- Region: Vladimir Oblast
- District: Suzdalsky District
- Time zone: UTC+3:00

Prudy (Russian: Пруды) is a rural locality (a village) in Seletskoye Rural Settlement, Suzdalsky District, Vladimir Oblast, Russia. The population was 10 as of 2010. There are 2 streets.

== Geography ==
Prudy is located on the Uyechka River, 18 km southeast of Suzdal (the district's administrative centre) by road. Sanino is the nearest rural locality.
