= Averyanovka, Republic of Dagestan =

Averyanovka Аверьяновка
- Selo
- Location within Republic of Dagestan Location within Russia
- Coordinates: 43°50′N 46°45′E
- Country: Russia
- Region: Republic of Dagestan
- District: Kizlyarsky District
- Time zone: UTC+3:00

Averyanovka (Russian: Аверьяновка) is a rural locality (a selo) and the administrative centre of Averyanovsky Selsoviet, Kizlyarsky District, Republic of Dagestan, Russia. The population was 3,532 as of 2010. There are 50 streets.

== Nationalities ==
Dargins, Avars, Russians, Laks, Lezgins, Tabasarans and Tsakhurs live there.

== Geography ==
Averyanovka is located 3 km southeast of Kizlyar (the district's administrative centre) by road. Kizlyar and Yefimovka are the nearest rural localities.
