= Siemens-Schuckert R.II =

Bomber aircraft prototype

R.II
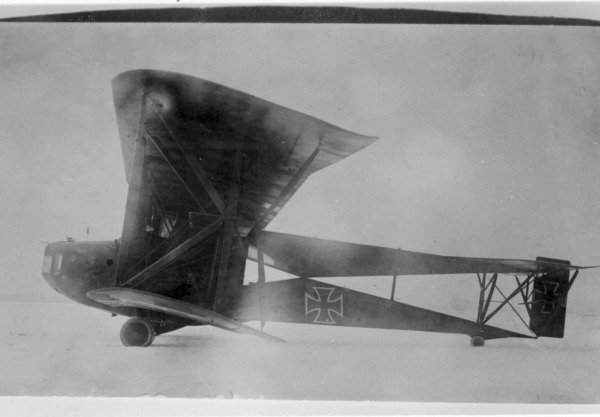

General information
- Type: Bomber
- National origin: Germany
- Manufacturer: Siemens-Schuckert
- Designer: Bruno and Franz Steffen
- Primary user: Luftstreitkräfte
- Number built: 1

History
- First flight: 26 October 1915
- Developed from: Siemens-Schuckert R.I

The Siemens-Schuckert R.II was a prototype bomber aircraft built in Germany during World War I. It was one of six aircraft based on the Siemens-Schuckert R.I that were originally intended to be identical, but which each developed in a different direction and were designated as different aircraft types by the German Inspectorate of Flying Troops (the Idflieg). Although the R.II was the first of the batch to be completed, it was the last accepted into military service, and then only as a trainer.

The Siemens-Schuckert R.II to R.VII were ordered in the G (Grossflugzeug - large aircraft) series and given serial numbers G.32/15 to G.37/15 respectively. These serials were changed on 13 July 1915 to G.33/15 - G.38/15, for unknown reasons and again on 6 November 1915 to R.2/15 - R.7/15 in the R (Riesenflugzeug - giant aircraft) series, adopting the R.II to R.VII designations.

== Design and development ==
As designed, the R.II was a large three-bay biplane with unstaggered wings of unequal span and a fully enclosed cabin. Power was to be supplied by three 180-kW (240-hp) Maybach HS engines mounted internally in the fuselage, which transmitted their power via driveshafts to two propellers mounted tractor-fashion on the interplane struts nearest the fuselage. The main undercarriage consisted of divided units, each of which carried dual wheels, and the tail was supported by a pair of tailwheels. The fuselage was forked into an upper and lower section, which allowed a clear field of fire to the rear of the aircraft.

The R.II first flew on 26 October 1915 and was delivered to the military on 20 November. The Maybach engines proved immediately troublesome, prone to overheating and mechanical failure. In February 1916, the engines were removed and returned to the manufacturer. Ongoing trouble with the same engine in other aircraft eventually led Siemens-Schuckert to abandon work with these engines entirely and in June, the firm asked the Idflieg whether to install Benz Bz.IV or Mercedes D.IVa in the R.II instead. By the time that the Idflieg approved the Mercedes engine for installation, Siemens-Schuckert did not have the workforce available to install them, and placed the R.II in storage instead.

While the R.II was in storage, the Idflieg changed its requirements for the aircraft, requesting that the operational altitude be increased from 3,000 to 3,500 m (9,800 to 11,500 ft), but hoping that even more altitude would be possible. Siemens-Schuckert responded that this would not be possible with the Mercedes engines recently approved for installation, and suggested three Benz D.IV engines inside the fuselage, augmented by two more of the same engine mounted pusher-fashion in the interplane gap. The Idflieg rejected this suggestion, insisting on the basic requirement of having the engines serviceable in flight. By the time that workers were available for the R.II again, in early 1917, Siemens-Schuckert had gained experience with the similar R.VII and attempted to meet the Idflieg's requirements by installing extra sections in the wing to extend it to six bays and thereby offset the extra weight of the new engines. The upper wings were replaced with a new design with greater chord, and the tail surfaces were enlarged. Finally, bomb racks were fitted to the wings that could carry either six 50-kg bombs or four 100-kg bombs.

During its acceptance flight, the newly refurbished R.II carried a 2,310-kg (5,100-lb) useful load to an altitude of 3,800 m (12,500 ft) and stayed aloft for four hours. Having satisfied requirements, R.II was delivered to Riesenflugzeugersatzabteilung (Rea — "giant aircraft support unit"), the support unit for R-type aircraft, on 29 June 1917. Although the R.II's performance was a significant improvement over other R-type aircraft produced by Siemens-Schuckert, its increased span and weight limited its speed, and it could not keep pace with similar aircraft manufactured by Staaken then entering service. The R.II was therefore relegated to training duties with the Riesenflugzeug Schulabteilung ("giant aircraft training unit") at Döberitz. In June 1918, it was transferred back to Rea at Cologne, where it crashed later that year.

== Units using this aircraft ==
- Luftstreitkräfte
  - Riesenflugzeugersatzabteilung
  - Riesenflugzeug Schulabteilung

== Specifications ==
Data from Grey & Thetford 1962, p.572

General characteristics

- Crew: 5
- Length: 18.5 m (60 ft 8.5 in)
- Wingspan: 38 m (124 ft 8.25 in)
- Height: 4.6 m (15 ft 1.13 in)
- Wing area: 233 m^{2} (2,516 sq ft)
- Empty weight: 6,150 kg (13,540 lb)
- Gross weight: 8,460 kg (18,612 lb)
- Powerplant: 3 × Mercedes D.IVa , 190 kW (260 hp) each

Performance

- Maximum speed: 110 km/h (69 mph, 60 kn)
- Endurance: 4 hours
