= Aleksandr Averin =

Alexander Averin may refer to:

- Aleksandr Averin (cyclist) (born 1954), Soviet Olympic cyclist
- Aleksandr Averin (publicist) (born 1981), Russian political dissident and publicist
- Oleksandr Averin (Alexander Averin), Ukrainian cross-country skiing trainer of the Turkish team at the 2006 Winter Olympics
