= Nikolay Averyanov =

Nikolai Averyanov may refer to:

- Nikolay Averyanov (decathlete) (born 1980), Russian decathlete
- Nikolai Averyanov (footballer) (born 1989), Russian footballer
