= Averkiyevo =

Averkiyevo (Russian: Аверкиево) is the name of several rural localities in Russia:

- Averkiyevo, Ivanovo Oblast, a village in Ilyinsky District of Ivanovo Oblast
- Averkiyevo, Moscow Oblast, a village in Averkiyevskoye Rural Settlement of Pavlovo-Posadsky District in Moscow Oblast; 55°39′N 38°38′E
