= Siemens-Schuckert R.I =

Military aircraft

R.I

General information
- Type: Bomber
- National origin: Germany
- Manufacturer: Siemens-Schuckert
- Designer: Bruno and Franz Steffen
- Number built: 1

History
- First flight: 24 May 1915
- Developed into: Siemens-Schuckert R.II, R.III, R.IV, R.V, R.VI, and R.VII

The Siemens-Schuckert R.I was a bomber aircraft built in Germany during World War I. It was originally ordered as the Siemens-Schuckert G.I prior to the German Inspectorate of Flying Troops (the Idflieg) adopting the "R" classification for multi-engine aircraft in late 1915. Some sources refer to the aircraft as the Siemens-Schuckert Steffen R.I, including the name of the brothers that designed it.

The R.I was a large three-bay biplane with unstaggered wings of unequal span and a fully enclosed cabin. Power was supplied by three 112-kW (150-hp) Benz Bz.III engines mounted internally in the fuselage, which transmitted their power via driveshafts to two propellers mounted tractor-fashion on the interplane struts nearest the fuselage. The main undercarriage consisted of divided units, each of which carried dual wheels, and the tail was supported by a pair of tailwheels. The rear fuselage structure was forked into an upper and lower section, which allowed a clear field of fire to the rear of the aircraft. The entire structure was of wire-braced wood, covered in fabric.

Designers Bruno and Franz Steffen piloted the aircraft themselves on its first test flight on 24 May 1915. They ended this flight prematurely because of overheating in the gearboxes, and subsequent tests revealed other defects such as excessive vibration in the drive system. With these problems addressed, the R.I was ready for its Idflieg acceptance flights in June 1915. Bruno Steffen ferried the three-person inspection team, plus a number of passengers, from Neumünster to Döberitz. He had even placed two armchairs and a bottle of champagne in the cabin for the occasion. The R.I reached Döberitz safely and made around twenty-four test flights before it was accepted by the military on 26 July 1915.

On 13 October 1915, the R.I was assigned to Feldfliegerabteil 31, a reconnaissance unit, at Slonim. However, a series of mishaps and malfunctions prevented it from seeing any operational use and the R.I was dismantled and sent back to Berlin by rail in March 1916. Although damaged in transit, the R.I was repaired and was assigned to the Riesenflugzeugersatzabteilung (Rea — "giant aircraft support unit") as a trainer from mid 1916 to 1918 — possibly even to the Armistice.

Parts of the R.I were preserved in a Berlin museum until being destroyed by bombing during World War II. Despite the difficulties encountered with the design, the Idflieg was sufficiently impressed with the R.I to order a batch of six similar aircraft on 26 June 1915, to be powered with the more powerful Maybach HS engine in place of the Benz B.III used by the R.I. Although the six were originally intended to be identical, each developed in a different direction and were eventually designated as different aircraft types by the Idflieg — R.II, R.III, R.IV, R.V, R.VI, R.VII.

The R.I was ordered and delivered as the Siemens-Schuckert G.I in the G (Grossflugzeug - large aircraft) series and given serial number SSW G.I 31/15, changed to SSW G.I 32/15 before the final change to R.I/15. Similarly, the Siemens-Schuckert R.II to R.VII were ordered in the G (Grossflugzeug - large aircraft) series and given serial numbers G.32/15 to G.37/15 respectively. These serials were changed on 13 July 1915 to G.33/15 - G.38/15, for unknown reasons and again on 6 November 1915 to R.2/15 - R.7/15 in the R (Riesenflugzeug - giant aircraft) series, adopting the R.II to R.VII designations.

== Variants ==
Siemens-Schuckert R.I
Siemens-Schuckert R.II
Siemens-Schuckert R.III
Siemens-Schuckert R.IV
Siemens-Schuckert R.V
Siemens-Schuckert R.VI
Siemens-Schuckert R.VII

== Specifications ==
Data from Kroschel & Stützer 1994, p.133

General characteristics

- Crew: 4
- Length: 17.5 m (57 ft 5 in)
- Wingspan: 28 m (91 ft 11 in)
- Height: 5.2 m (17 ft 1 in)
- Wing area: 138 m^{2} (1,490 sq ft)
- Empty weight: 4,000 kg (8,800 lb)
- Gross weight: 5,200 kg (11,440 lb)
- Powerplant: 3 × Benz Bz.III , 112 kW (150 hp) each

Performance

- Maximum speed: 110 km/h (69 mph, 60 kn)
- Range: 520 km (325 mi, 282 nmi)
- Service ceiling: 3,700 m (12,100 ft)

Armament

- 1 × 7.9-mm machine gun
- 500 kg (1,100 lb) of bombs.
