= Averky =

Russian masculine given name

Averky (Russian: Аве́ркий) is a Russian Christian male first name. The name is possibly derived from the Latin word averto, meaning to rout, to hold, to turn away, or to attract, but it is more likely that the name is a Russified version of Abercius, a well-known saint venerated by Orthodox Christians. Its colloquial variants are Averyan (Аверья́н), Avery (Аве́рий), and Overky (Ове́ркий).

The diminutives of "Averky" are Avera (Аве́ра), Averya (Аве́ря), Vera (Ве́ра), Averyanka (Аве́рьянка), and Yana (Я́на).

The patronymics derived from "Averky" are "Аве́ркиевич" (Averkiyevich; masculine) and its colloquial form "Аве́ркич" (Averkich), and "Аве́ркиевна" (Averkiyevna; feminine). The patronymics derived from "Averyan" are "Аверья́нович" (Averyanovich; masculine) and its colloquial form "Аверья́ныч" (Averyanych), and "Аверья́новна" (Averyanovna; feminine). The patronymics derived from "Avery" are "Аве́рьевич" (Averyevich; masculine) and its colloquial form "Аве́рич" (Averich), and "Аве́рьяновна" (Averyanovna; feminine).

Last names derived from this first name and its variants include Averkiyev, Averin, and Averyanov.

- Averky Aristov (1903–1973), Soviet politician and diplomat
- Averky Taushev (1906–1976), Russian Orthodox Archbishop
