= Prudy =

Prudy (Russian: Пруды) is the name of several rural localities in Russia:

- Prudy, Leningrad Oblast, a settlement in Leningrad Oblast
- Prudy, Vladimir Oblast, a village in Vladimir Oblast
- Prudy, name of several other rural localities
