= Iža =

Village in Slovakia

Iža Izsa
- Municipality
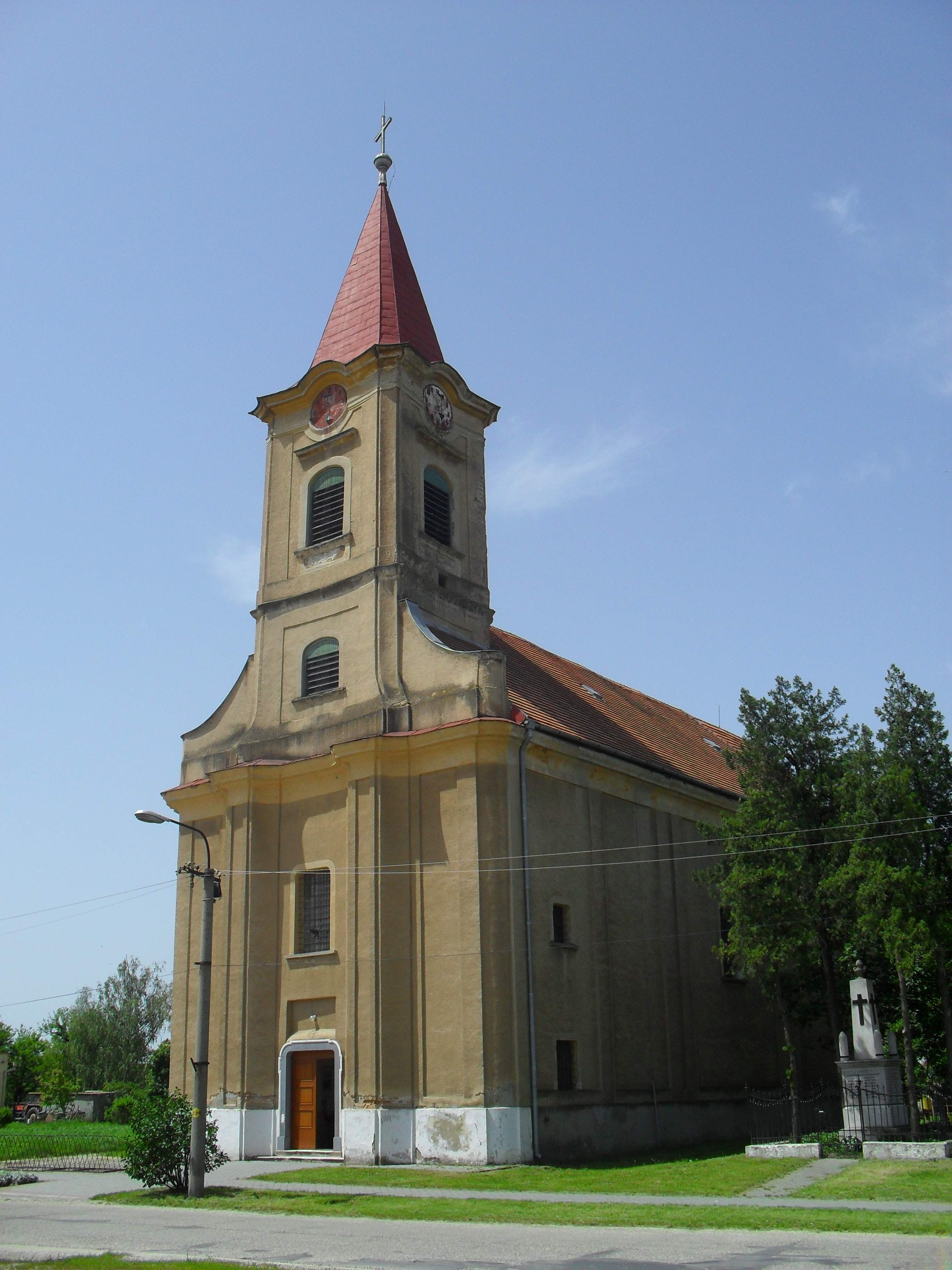
- Church of Saint Michael

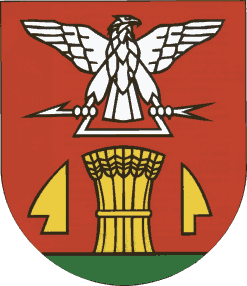
- Flag Coat of arms

- Location of Iža in the Nitra Region Location of Iža in Slovakia
- Coordinates: 47.75°N 18.23°E
- Country: Slovakia
- Region: Nitra Region
- District: Komárno District
- First mentioned: 1268

Government
  - Mayor: István Domin (SMK-MKP)

Area
  - Total: 28.07 km^{2} (10.84 sq mi)
- Elevation: 108 m (354 ft)

Population (2025)
  - Total: 1,798
- Time zone: UTC+1 (CET)
  - Summer (DST): UTC+2 (CEST)
- Postal code: 946 39
- Area code: +421 35
- Vehicle registration plate (until 2022): KN
- Website: www.iza.sk

Iža (Hungarian: Izsa, Hungarian pronunciation:[ˈiʒɒ]) is a village in south-western Slovakia.

== History ==
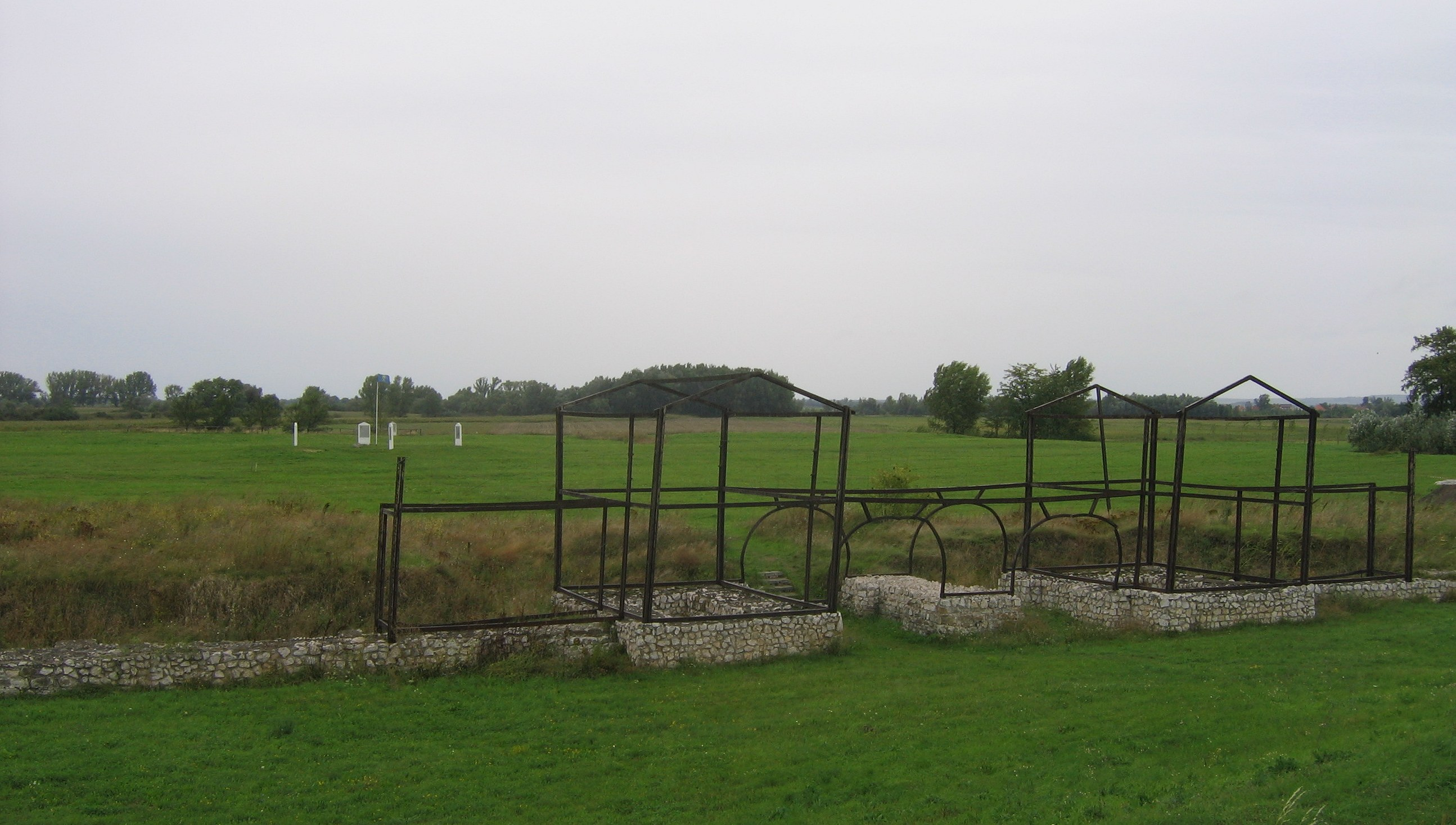
Ruins of Celemantia with metal frames to indicate the destroyed superstructure

The biggest Roman castellum in present-day Slovakia was located in Celemantia, an ancient settlement discovered on the territory of Iža. Celemantia was already mentioned by Claudius Ptolemaios in the 2nd century CE and it was abandoned in around 400 CE. The modern village of Iža was first mentioned in 1268.

Kelemantia was probably a bridgehead for the larger fortress of Brigetio, across the river near Komárom. But it was still fairly big, at 172 metres (564 ft) square. The excavated and partly reconstructed fort, which is accessible via a rough lane from Iža, was the second to be built on the site. It contained barracks, stable blocks and a bathhouse and was surrounded by a stone wall two metres (6 ft 7 in) thick and up to five metres (16 ft) high. Parts of these structures are now visible and described by information boards in four languages, including English.

The first fort on the site, whose foundations have been partly surveyed, was an earth and timber construction. It is believed to have been destroyed by barbarian attacks less than five years after it was built. Evidence of temporary encampments nearby - presumably built to house the large expeditionary force despatched by Rome to wallop the natives in turn - were revealed by an aerial survey in 1990.

In the 9th century, the territory of Iža became part of the Kingdom of Hungary. After the Austro-Hungarian army disintegrated in November 1918, Czechoslovak troops occupied the area, later acknowledged internationally by the Treaty of Trianon. Between 1938 and 1945 Iža once more became part of Miklós Horthy's Hungary through the First Vienna Award. From 1945 until the Velvet Divorce, it was part of Czechoslovakia. Since then it has been part of Slovakia.

== Geography ==
The municipality lies at an altitude of 108 metres (354 ft) and covers an area of 28.07 km^{2} (10.84 sq mi) (2025). It is situated in the Komárno District of Slovakia's Nitra Region, very close to the town of Komárno.

== Population ==
Population statistic (10 years)
Year	1995	2005	2015	2025
Count	1620	1616	1638	1798
Difference		−0.24%	+1.36%	+9.76%

Population statistic
Year	2024	2025
Count	1797	1798
Difference		+0.05%

It has a population of 1798 people (31 December 2025).

=== Ethnicity ===
Census 2021 (1+ %)
Ethnicity	Number	Fraction
Hungarian	1172	65.8%
Slovak	516	28.97%
Not found out	152	8.53%
Total	1781	

In year 2021 was 1781 people by ethnicity 1172 as Hungarian, 516 as Slovak, 152 as Not found out, 11 as Czech, 10 as Romanian, 6 as Ukrainian, 5 as Polish, 5 as Other, 4 as Romani, 1 as Italian, 1 as Rusyn, 1 as Austrian and 1 as German.

Note on population: The difference values of population numbers in the table "Population statistic" and in the sections "Ethnicity" & "Religion" is caused by the use of various statistical methods.

=== Religion ===
Census 2021 (1+ %)
Religion	Number	Fraction
Roman Catholic Church	907	50.93%
None	536	30.1%
Not found out	135	7.58%
Calvinist Church	110	6.18%
Evangelical Church	58	3.26%
Total	1781	

In year 2021 was 1781 people by religion 907 from Roman Catholic Church, 536 from None, 135 from Not found out, 110 from Calvinist Church, 58 from Evangelical Church, 12 from Greek Catholic Church, 7 from Eastern Orthodox Church, 6 from Christian Congregations in Slovakia, 3 from Other, 2 from Jehovah's Witnesses, 1 from Jewish community, 1 from Other and not ascertained christian church, 1 from United Methodist Church, 1 from Buddhism and 1 from Baptists Church.

== Sights ==
- Roman Castellum and Settlement - Roman military camp Celemantia is located 7 km east of Komárno in the village of Iža, on the bank of Danube. There are no doubts that the Romans during their greatest territorial expansion came to the far North and crossed the Danube river. A memento of their former presence is also a military camp Celemantia that originated near the village of Iža during the reign of Emperor Marcus Aurelius. The camp was part of the famous border defense system Limes Romanus, which however fell in the year 179 after the raid of Germanic tribes.
- Roman and Ethnographical Museum - In Iža you can find Kelemantia Roman and Ethnographic Museum, which was opened in 2013. The museum was created as part of the project "Connecting to an international tourist route: In the footsteps of Romans on the Danube". There are two expositions in the museum: Roman and ethnographic.
- Turkish Bridge - Not far from the pumping-station, on the bank of the River Danube there is a tiny bridge with arched supporting structure. It is said that the bridge remained from the Turkish times. It is in good technical condition.
- The monument of the victims of World War I.- Next to the Catholic church is a monument to those who fell in World War I.
- The monument of the victims of World War II. - The monument to those who fell in World War II with the names stands around the center of the cemetery. The monument was built in 1996 and is made of artificial stone.
- The flood memorial from 1965 - In a small park on the main street (opposite the sports field) there is a flood memorial from 1965.
- The Persei-mill - At the end of the village on the left side there is the Persei-mill, which was built by Lajos Persei in 1939. The remained part functions as a store today.
- The Géza-chapel - The graveyard is for people of Catholic, Evangelic and Reformed religion. A remarkable point of the cemetery is the small chapel of the Kurucz family, the Géza-chapel. The memorial of Lujza Kurucz is the artwork of János Nagy, on the left. Behind the chapel, on the highest point of the cemetery, stands the main cross with two graves of local priests in front of it (Kálmán Nádai, parson of Iža (1884-1956), Károly Jánoki priest (1782-1840)). The main cross is made of red marble from the village Süttő, Hungary, created in baroque style. As a rarity we can mention the white wooden crosses of the cemetery, covered with small triangle roof, which can not be found elsewhere. The second main, red-marble cross of the cemetery is from the year 1878. We can see a typical Hungarian wooden column, the work of the Transylvanian (Romania) wood-carving master Sándor Felszegi. The typical carved Transylvanian gate is also his work from the year 2018.
- Sandstone statue of St. John Nepomuk - Next to the Catholic church, about thirty steps from the monument to the fallen in World War I, stands on a marble pedestal (marble is from the village of Süttő in MR) sandstone statue of St. John Nepomuk.
- St. Michael, the Archangel Roman Catholic Church - The Catholic church, which was probably built in the 16th century, has its main axis running in an east-west direction, with a single nave, a sanctuary with a sacristy added on the south side. The church bears the name of St. Michael the Archangel.
- The Evangelical Church - The foundation stone of the Evangelical church in Iža was laid and consecrated on July 19, 1997, at a commemoration of the 50th anniversary of the settlement of Slovaks relocated from the Great Plain.
- The Reformed Church - The year of construction of the Reformed church is 1871. It has a rectangular floor plan and its interior is distinguished by its puritanism: benches, pulpit, lord's table and harmonium. Iron pillars hold the ceiling. Its windows are finished with a semicircle.
- The Sikul Gate - is located in front of the municipal office in 2018, is the work of woodcarver Sándor Felszegi of Székelyudvarhely (Romania).
- The Artesian well - In the middle of the village towards Štúrovo there is an artesian well, the water of which springs from a depth of 220 m. Above the well is a filagory where travelers can relax.
- The Bokors Saline Protected Area - Bokros is a tiny island home to special salt-loving species in the middle of an intensively cultivated agricultural landscape. It is the northernmost extension of the Hungarian saline steppes. This area is a habitat for special plant and animal species.

== Actively ==
Bicycle tour Komárno - Iža (Celemantia): The panorama of the Danube also provides cultural heritage and enriching programs. Regional specialities, products and wines provide gastronomic experiences. The new cycling route, allows access to experience many different programs every day.

== Facilities ==
The village has a public library, a gym and a football pitch. In 2013, a new museum was opened in the village, which focuses specifically on the history of the Danube Lands.

== Genealogical resources ==
The records for genealogical research are available at the state archive "Statny Archiv in Nitra, Slovakia"

- Roman Catholic church records (births/marriages/deaths): 1722-1901 (parish A)
- Lutheran church records (births/marriages/deaths): 1783-1908 (parish B)
- Reformated church records (births/marriages/deaths): 1827-1895 (parish B)

== See also ==
- List of municipalities and towns in Slovakia
