= List of aircraft (U) =

This is a list of aircraft in alphabetical order beginning with 'U'.

== U ==
=== UAC ===
(See: Antonov, Ilyushin, Irkut Corporation, Mikoyan, Sukhoi, Tupolev and Yakovlev)

=== UCA ===
(Universal Composite Aviation)

- UCA Carbon Bird

=== UCC ===
(United Consultant Corp, Norwood, MA)

- UCC UC-1 Twin Bee

=== Udet ===
(Udet Flugzeugbau)

- Udet U 1
- Udet U 2
- Udet U 3 Project
- Udet U 4
- Udet U 5
- Udet U 6
- Udet U 7 Kolibri
- Udet U 8 "Limousine"
- Udet U 9
- Udet U 10
- Udet U 11 Kondor
- Udet U 12 "Flamingo"
- Udet U 13 "Bayern"

=== UDRD ===
(Universal Dynamics Research & Development)

- UDRD Defiant 300

=== Uetz ===
(Walter Uetz Flugzeugbau)

- Uetz U2-MFGZ a modified Jodel D.119 with a Jodel-designed wing, one built.
- Uetz U2V a modified Jodel D.119 with a new wing.
- Uetz U3M Pelikan
- Uetz U4M Pelikan

=== UFAG ===
(Ungarische Flugzeugfabrik Abteil Gesellschaft / Ungarische Flugzeugwerke Aktien Gesellschaft)

- Note: UFAG were allocated 60 series numbers for experimental and prototype aircraft.
- UFAG 60.01
- UFAG 60.02 (D.I)
- UFAG 60.03 (C.II)
- UFAG series 160 - Hansa-Brandenburg C.II(U)
- UFAG series 61 - Hansa-Brandenburg C.I(U) - Austro-Daimler 210hp (160 kW) engine
- UFAG series 161 - UFAG C.I
- UFAG series 62 - Hansa-Brandenburg G.I(U)
- UFAG series 63 - Hansa-Brandenburg C.I(U) - 120 kW (160 hp) Mercedes D.IIIs
- UFAG series 64 - Hansa-Brandenburg C.I(U) - Austro-Daimler 210 hp (160 kW) engine
- UFAG series 66 - Hansa-Brandenburg C.II(U)
- UFAG series 67 - Hansa-Brandenburg C.I(U) - Austro-Daimler 210 hp (160 kW) engine
- UFAG series 68 - Hansa-Brandenburg C.I(U) - Austro-Daimler 210 hp (160 kW) engine
- UFAG series 69 - Hansa-Brandenburg C.I(U) - 150 kW (200 hp) Hiero V-8?
- UFAG series 169 - Hansa-Brandenburg C.I(U) - with 160 kW (220 hp) Benz Bz.IVas
- UFAG series 269 - Hansa-Brandenburg C.I(U) - Austro-Daimler 210 hp (150 kW) engine
- UFAG series 369 - Hansa-Brandenburg C.I(U) - 170 kW (230 hp) Hiero 6
- UFAG C.I
- UFAG C.II
- UFAG D.I

=== UL-Jih ===
(UL-Jih Sedláĉek Spol s.r.o.)

- UL-Jih E80 Evolution
- UL-Jih E100 Evolution
- UL-Jih F80 Fascination
- UL-Jih F100 Fascination

=== UFM ===
- UFM Easy Riser
- UFM Mauro Solar Riser

=== UFO ===
(Geoff Price, P.O. Box 15, Whitford, Auckland 2149, New Zealand )

- UFO HeliThruster

=== ULBI ===
(Ultraleicht Bau International GmbH, Hassfurt, Germany)

- ULBI WT01 Wild Thing
- ULBI WT02 Wild Thing

=== Ullmann ===
- Ullmann 2000 Panther

=== Ultimate Aircraft ===
(Ultimate Aircraft Corporation, Canada)

- Ultimate Aircraft 10 Dash 100
- Ultimate Aircraft 10 Dash 200
- Ultimate Aircraft 10 Dash 300
- Ultimate Aircraft 20 Dash 300
- Ultimate Aircraft Special

=== Ultimate Flight Designs ===
(Ultimate Flight Designs, Mounds, OK)

- Ultimate Jetwing

=== Ultra-Efficient Products ===
- Ultra-Efficient Products Invader
- Ultra-Efficient Products Penetrater

=== Ultra-Fab ===
- Ultra-Fab Sundowner

=== Ultra-Leicht Flugtechnik ===
(Braunschweig, Germany)

- Ultra-Leicht Flugtechnik Speedy Mouse

=== Ultracraft ===
(Heusden-Zolder, Belgium)

- Ultracraft Calypso

=== Ultraflight ===
(Ultraflight Sales Limited)

- Ultraflight Lazair
- Ultraflight Lazair Series I
- Ultraflight Lazair Series II
- Ultraflight Lazair Series III
- Ultraflight Lazair Elite
- Ultraflight Lazair II
- Ultraflight Lazair SS
- Ultraflight Electric Lazair

=== Ultralight Design ===
(Cvikov, Česká Lípa District, Liberec Region, Czech Republic)

- Ultralight Design Atos Trike

=== Ultralight Flight ===
(Ultralight Flight Inc.)

- Ultralight Flight Mirage

=== Ultraleve ===
- Ultraleve Fox
- Ultraleve Coyote

=== Ultralite Soaring ===
(Ultralite Soaring Inc)

- Ultralite Soaring Wizard W1
- Ultralite Soaring Wizard J2
- Ultralite Soaring Wizard J-3
- Ultralite Soaring Wizard J-3 Magnum
- Ultralite Soaring Wizard T3

=== Ultravia ===
(Ultravia Aero Inc.)

- Ultravia Longnose Pelican
- Ultravia Le Pelican
- Ultravia Super Pelican
- Ultravia Pelican Club
- Ultravia Pelican PL
- Ultravia Pelican Sport
- Ultravia Pelican Sport 600
- Ultravia Pelican Tutor
- Ultravia Flyer Super Sport (Flyer SS)
- Ultravia Pelican AULA 600

=== Umbaugh ===
( (Raymond E) Umbaugh Aircraft Corp, Ocala, FL)

- Umbaugh U-17
- Umbaugh U-18

=== Umeda ===
(Yuzo Umeda)

- Umeda 1910 Aeroplane

=== Umino ===
(Ikunosuke Umino)

- Umino Seaplane

=== Union ===
(Union Aircraft Co, Long Island, NY)

- Union Rotorplane

=== Union ===
(Union-Flugzeugwerke G.m.b.H)

- Union arrow biplane
- Union G.I

=== UNIS ===
(Unis Obchodni spol. s.r.o.)

- UNIS 40 Bongo

=== United ===
(Tips & Smith Inc (engines), Houston, TX)

- United 1927 Biplane

=== United ===
(United Aircraft Corp (Pres: Curtis C Baldwin), on acquisition of Lark Aircraft Co, 471 W 1st St, Wichita, KS)

- United Lark
- UAC Special

=== United Consultants ===
(United Consultants Corporation)

- United Consultants Twin Bee

=== United Eastern ===
(United Eastern Aeroplane Co, 1251 DeKalb Ave, Brooklyn, NY)

- United Eastern A-M Tractor

=== United Helicopters ===
(United Helicopters inc.)

- United Helicopters C-4 Commuter

=== Universal ===
(Universal Aircraft Co, Fort Worth, TX)

- Universal 98 Trainer

=== Universal ===
- Meteor
- Model H
- Model H Special
- Model 201
- Model 275
- Model 5
- Monocoupe Model 22
- Monocoupe Model 70
- Model 90
- Model 110 Special
- Monocoupe Model 113
- Monocoupe Model 125
- Monocoupe Model D-145
- Monoprep
- Model 90
- Model 218
- Monosport
- Model 1
- Model 2
- Model D
- Model G
- Model G Deluxe
- Model 1344

=== Universal ===
Universal American Flea Ship

=== University of Berlin ===
- Berlin B.9

=== University of Maryland ===
(University of Maryland)

- University of Maryland Gamera Human Powered Helicopter

=== University of Minnesota ===
(University of Minnesota, Minneapolis, MN)

- University of Minnesota T-1

=== University of Toronto Institute for Aerospace Studies ===
(UTIAS)

- UTIAS Ornithopter No.1
- UTIAS SHARP

=== Unruh-Albright ===
(Marion Unruh & George Albright, Falls Church, VA)

- Unruh-Albright Pretty Prairie Special I
- Unruh-Albright Pretty Prairie Special II
- Unruh-Albright Pretty Prairie Special III

=== UP International ===
(Garmisch-Partenkirchen, Germany)

- UP Ascent
- UP Blues
- UP Boogie
- UP Cab
- UP Comet
- UP Condor
- UP Dragonfly
- UP Edge
- UP Escape
- UP Flash
- UP Gambit
- UP Gamit
- UP Groove
- UP Jazz
- UP K2
- UP Kantana
- UP Kantega
- UP Katana
- UP Kendo
- UP Kuna
- UP Makalu
- UP Pickup
- UP Pico
- UP Pulse
- UP Rock
- UP Sherpa
- UP Soul
- UP Stellar
- UP Summit
- UP Targa
- UP Trango
- UP TRX
- UP Vision
- UP Xpress

=== Urban Air ===
- Urban Air Lambada
- Urban Air Samba

=== URMV-3 ===
(Uzinele de Reparatii Material Volant-3)

- URMV-3 MR-2
- URMV-3 IAR 813
- URMV-3 IAR 814
- URMV-3 IAR 817
- URMV-3 RM-12

=== Urness-Hanson ===
(Alfred H Urness & Henry J Hanson, Cashton, WI)

- Urness-Hanson Toadstabber

=== Ursinus ===
- Ursinus Seaplane Retractactable Float

=== US Aircraft ===
(US Aircraft Corporation)

- US Aircraft A-67 Dragon

=== U S Flyer ===
(U S Airplane Co, 3670 Milwaukee Ave, Chicago, IL)

- U S Flyer 1928 Biplane
- U S Flyer C-1
- U S Flyer C-2

=== US Aviation ===
- US Aviation Cumulus
- US Aviation Super Floater
- US Aviation CAVU
- US Aviation Cloud Dancer

=== US Light Aircraft ===
- US Light Aircraft Hornet

=== USAF ===
- USAF TR-3 Black Manta

=== U-Turn ===
(Villingen-Schwenningen, Germany)

- U-Turn Annapurna
- U-Turn Blacklight
- U-Turn Blackout
- U-Turn Emotion
- U-Turn Eternity
- U-Turn Everest
- U-Turn Evolution
- U-Turn Infinity
- U-Turn Lightning
- U-Turn Paramotion
- U-Turn Passenger
- U-Turn Redout
- U-Turn Trinity
- U-Turn Twinforce

=== Utva ===
(Fabrika Aviona Utva: Utva Aircraft Industry) (Serbian: Utva - Wild Duck)

- Utva Aero 3
- Utva Lasta ("Swallow")
- Utva C-3 Trojka
- Utva 56
- Utva 60
- UTVA-65 Privrednik I: based on UTVA-60 as agricultural aircraft
- Utva 66
- UTVA-67 Privrednik II
- UTVA-70
- UTVA-71
- Utva 75A11 Ag version
- Utva 75A21 2-seater
- Utva 75A41 4-seater
- Utva 78
- UTVA-81
- UTVA-84
- UTVA-85
- Utva 96
- Utva 212
- Utva 213 Vihor ("Whirlwind")
- Utva Kobac
- UTVA-95 Lasta: two seat primary/basic trainer and light attack aircraft
- UTVA N-62 Super Galeb: light attack advanced jet trainer

== See also ==
- List of jet airliners
