= List of gliders (U) =

This is a list of gliders/sailplanes of the world, (this reference lists all gliders with references, where available) Note: Any aircraft can glide for a short time, but gliders are designed to glide for longer.

== U ==
=== Unknown gliders ===
- U 2934 Ultra-light biplane
- U 3426 German glider
- U 3428 German glider
- U 3430 USA glider
- U 3873 Glider
- U 3971 Tandem glider
- U 3975 German glider biplane
- Bacerka (glider) only info is a photo at

=== US Aviation ===
- US Aviation Cloud Dancer
- US Aviation Cumulus
- US Aviation Super Floater

=== Urban Air ===
- Urban Air UFM-13 Lambada

=== Ursinus ===
(Oskar Ursinus)

- Ursinus 1925 man-powered ornithopter

=== URMV-3 ===
(Uzinele de Reparatii Material Volant-3 – Braşov) cf. ILL and ICA-Brasov

- URMV-3 IS-2 – Iosif Şilimon
- URMV-3 IS-3 – Iosif Şilimon

=== Uszacki ===
(Antoni Uszacki)

- Uszacki KLS-I Młodego Lotnika

=== UTVA ===
- UTVA MJ-1 – Mitrovich
- UTVA Orao 1 – Mitrovich
- UTVA Komar – utility (designed in Poland);
- UTVA Jastreb–utility (designed in Poland)
- UTVA Orlik – utility
- UTVA Ždral – utility (designed in Germany)
- UTVA Vaja–utility (designed in Germany)
- UTVA Čavka
- UTVA Jastreb
- UTVA Seva
- UTVA Soko
- UTVA Vrabac A
- UTVA Vrabac B
