= Albatros G.II =

Twin engined German biplane bomber

G.II
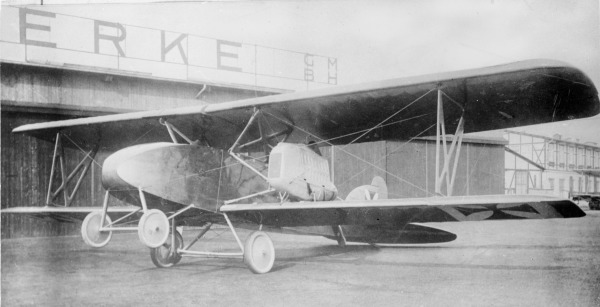

General information
- Type: Medium bomber
- Manufacturer: Albatros Flugzeugwerke
- Primary user: Germany
- Number built: 1

History
- First flight: 1916

The Albatros G.II, (Company post-war designation L.11), was a twin-engined German biplane bomber of World War I.

== Development ==
Designed as a medium bomber, the G.II did not share any attributes with the larger G.I, being a single bay biplane with thick section upper wings and rigid X member inter-plane struts. The graceful lines of the fuselage were spoilt by the twin nose-wheel assembly, intended to reduce damage on nose-overs and at rest with a forward centre of gravity. A conventional tail-unit terminated the rear fuselage. The engines were installed in pusher nacelles, supported by struts from the fuselage and the lower wing trailing edges had cut-outs to allow the engines to be mounted further forward than otherwise possible. Only a single prototype was built which demonstrated a relatively poor performance so further development was concentrated on the more powerful Albatros G.III.

== Operators ==
German Empire

- Luftstreitkräfte

== Specifications (G.II) ==
Data from German Aircraft of the First World War

- Powerplant: 2 × Benz Bz.III 6 cyl. water-cooled in-line piston engine, 112 kW (150 hp) each

== See also ==
Aircraft of comparable role, configuration, and era

- A.E.G. G.I
- Daimler R.I
- Union G.I
