= Cisco Snap 100 =

Engine for powered paragliding

Snap 100
- Type: Piston aircraft engine
- National origin: Italy
- Manufacturer: Cisco Motors
- Major applications: Paramotor

The Cisco Snap 100 is an Italian-designed piston engine for use in powered paragliding. It is a two-stroke, 96 cc capacity, single-cylinder, lightweight engine with electronic ignition, producing 17 BHP at 9000 rpm. It is designed and built by Cisco Motors.

== Accidents and incidents ==
The propeller assembly on the Snap 100 is held in by one bolt and has been prone to fall out and cause the propeller to fall off.

== Applications ==
- Bailey Snap 100 (Paramotor)
- Fly Products Ryan (Paramotor)
- Fresh Breeze Snap 100 (Paramotor)
- Clemente Snap 100 (Paramotor)

== Specifications (Snap 100) ==
Data from

=== General characteristics ===
- Type: Single cylinder, two-stroke paramotor engine
- Bore: 51 mm (2 in)
- Stroke: 47 mm (1.85 in)
- Displacement: 96 cm_{3} (5.86 cu in)
- Width: 295 mm (11.6 in)
- Height: 430 mm (19.9 in)
- Dry weight: 12.4 kg (27 lb)

=== Components ===
- Valvetrain: Piston ported two-stroke
- Fuel system: Walbro WB32 carburettor since 2007 WG08
- Fuel type: 92-98 Octane petrol
- Oil system: Pre-mixed synthetic two-stroke oil, ratio 40:1
- Cooling system: Fan cooled
- Reduction gear: 3.63:1 reduction ratio, clutch operated.
- Starting system Manual 'pull cord' starting system

=== Performance ===
- Power output: 12.5 kW (16.7 hp) at 9,400 rpm
- Specific power: 130 kW/L (2.84 hp/cu in)
- Compression ratio: 11.2:1
- Power-to-weight ratio: 1 kW/kg (0.6 hp/lb)

== See also ==
Related development

- Cisco Snap Bealy
- Cisco Snap Ego

Related lists

- List of aircraft engines
