= Culver Rigid Midget =

American glider

Rigid Midget

General information
- Type: Glider
- National origin: United States
- Manufacturer: Ray Parker and Bill Bowmar
- Designer: Irv Culver
- Status: No longer in production
- Number built: At least three

History
- Introduction date: 1947
- First flight: 1947
- Developed from: Culver Screaming Wiener
- Variant: Parker PJ-1 Tiny Mite

The Culver Rigid Midget is an American mid-wing, single seat glider that was designed by Irv Culver in 1941. The prototype was constructed by Ray Parker and Bill Bowmar and completed in 1947

== Design and development ==
Culver designed the Rigid Midget as a development of the Screaming Wiener in 1941, but due to the Second World War no prototype was constructed until 1947. The Rigid Midget resembles the Screaming Wiener, but the Midget has a wingspan that is 2 ft (61 cm) greater and it uses a different airfoil.

The first Midget was built by Parker and Bowmar and is registered with the Federal Aviation Administration as a Bellow Flex CC 4-36. Bowmar completely restored and rebuilt the aircraft in about 1971 and donated it to the National Soaring Museum.

The aircraft is constructed from wood, with the wings and tail surfaces finished in doped aircraft fabric covering and the fuselage covered in wood. The wing is of a small span at just 38 ft (11.6 m). Landing gear is a fixed monowheel.

A second Midget was constructed from plans by George Groff of Canoga Park, California. A third one, also built from plans, was noted when it was offered for sale during the 1970s in Soaring Magazine.

The Parker PJ-1 Tiny Mite was developed from the Midget and built by Parker and Dick Johnson, although by the time it was completed it had evolved considerably from the Midget.

== Operational history ==
The first Midget was completed in time for Parker to fly the aircraft in the 1947 US Nationals, held at Wichita Falls, Texas, in which he finished third. Parker's flights at that competition included a 235 mi (378 km) flight.

Bowmar and Parker flew over 1000 hours in the aircraft and Bowmar noted that it had nice handling characteristics, no vices and, with its short wingspan, was highly maneuverable.

== Aircraft on display ==
- National Soaring Museum - Parker and Bowmar's prototype, listed as in "storage"

== Specifications (Rigid Midget) ==
Data from Sailplane Directory and Soaring

General characteristics

- Crew: one
- Wingspan: 38 ft 0 in (11.58 m)
- Wing area: 100 sq ft (9.3 m^{2})
- Aspect ratio: 14.5:1
- Empty weight: 365 lb (166 kg)
- Gross weight: 550 lb (249 kg)

Performance

- Maximum glide ratio: 27.5:1 at 55 mph (89 km/h)
- Rate of sink: 174 ft/min (0.88 m/s) at 50 mph (80 km/h)
- Wing loading: 5.5 lb/sq ft (27 kg/m^{2})

== See also ==
Related lists

- List of gliders
