= CAVU =

CAVU can mean:

- Ceiling and Visibility Unlimited, an aviation meteorology term
- US Aviation CAVU, an ultralight aircraft, named after the meteorology term
