= Yamaha KT100 =

Kart engine

KT100
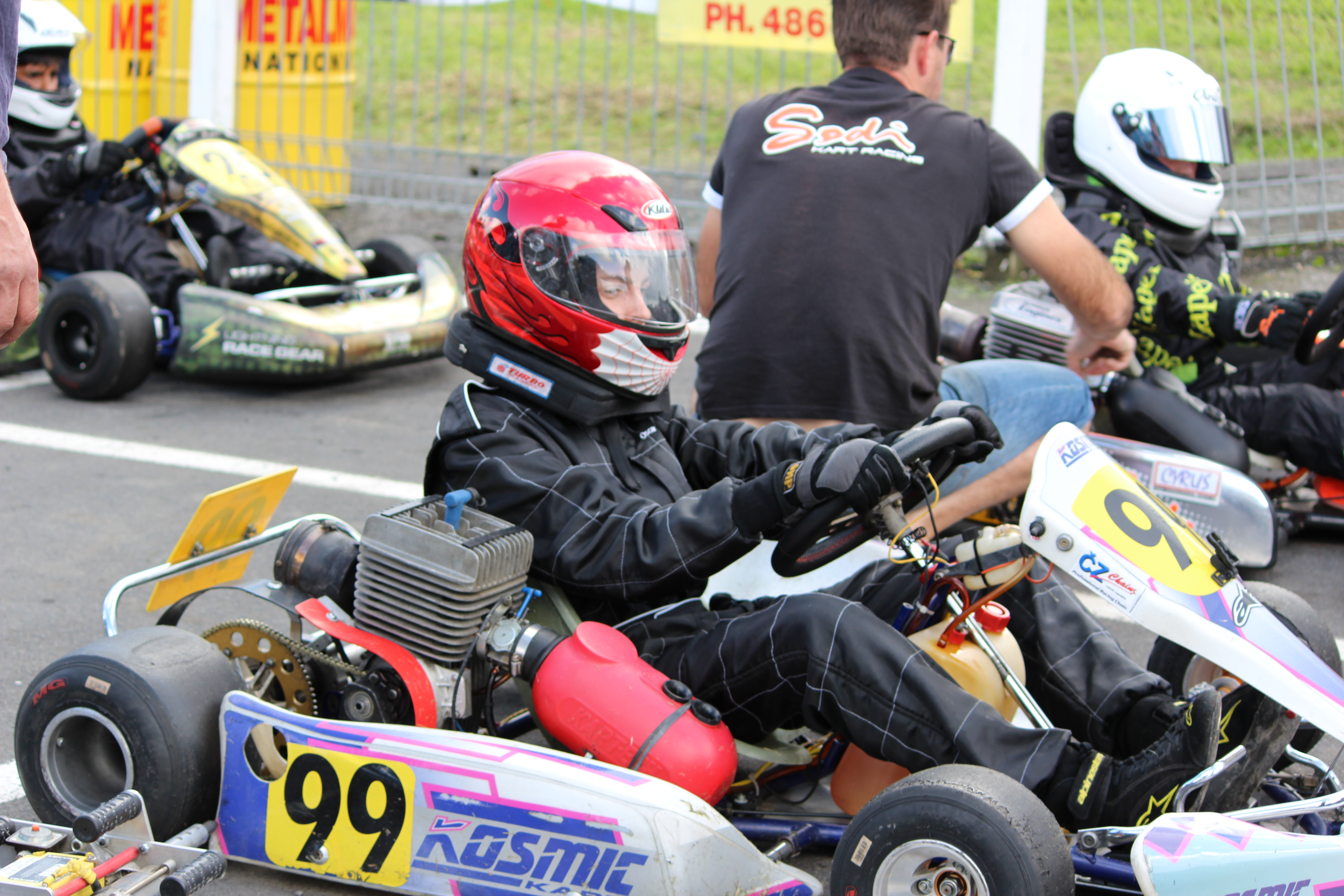
- A kart with a KT100 powerplant and a can type muffler
- Type: Single-cylinder, two-stroke engine
- National origin: Japan
- Manufacturer: Yamaha Motor Corporation
- Major applications: Kart racing; Ultralight aircraft

The Yamaha KT100 is a 100 cc two-stroke cycle kart engine made by Yamaha that has also been adapted for ultralight aircraft use.

== Design and development ==
The KT100 is a simple and rugged air-cooled engine that uses piston-ported intake induction with a Walbro WB-3A carburetor. The KT100 is a popular high-performance two-stroke kart racing engine. It comes in various forms used in many countries. The KT100J is slightly smaller with fewer options in comparison to its bigger brother, the KT100SE.

The KT100 is a very versatile engine using different exhaust systems and carburetors through a large range of classes. The KT100 can be tuned for most series and organizations with maximum and minimum rules.

== Aircraft use ==
In the late 1970s and early 1980s the engine was adapted for use on ultralight aircraft. The ultralights of that era were lighter and had much lower wing loadings than today, making flight practical on the KT100's 15 hp (11 kW) developed at 10,000 rpm. In aircraft use it was usually equipped with a recoil starter and a belt reduction drive.

== Applications ==
- Skyhigh Skybaby
- Striplin Lone Ranger
- Swallow Aeroplane Company Swallow A
- Ultralite Soaring Wizard
- Volmer VJ-24W SunFun

== Specifications (KT100S) ==
Data from Cliche and Yamaha

=== General characteristics ===
- Type: Single-cylinder, two-stroke engine
- Bore: 52 mm (2.05 in)
- Stroke: 46 mm (1.81 in)
- Displacement: 97.6 cc (5.96 cu in)
- Dry weight: 21 lb (10 kg)

=== Components ===
- Valvetrain: Piston port
- Fuel system: Walbro WB-3A carburetor
- Oil system: premix 20:1 fuel to oil ratio
- Cooling system: Air-cooled
- Reduction gear: PTO to clutch or direct drive, belt drive in aircraft use

=== Performance ===
- Power output: 15 hp (11 kW) at 10,000 rpm
