= Speedy Mouse =

Speedy Mouse may refer to:

- Ultra-Leicht Flugtechnik Speedy Mouse, a German ultralight aircraft
- Speedy Mouse, an attraction at Dream World (Thailand)
- Speedy Mouse, a former roller coaster at Barry's Amusements

== See also ==
- SpeedMouse
- Speedy Gonzales, a Looney Tunes mouse character
