= Crown City Glider Club Screaming Wiener =

American glider

Screaming Wiener
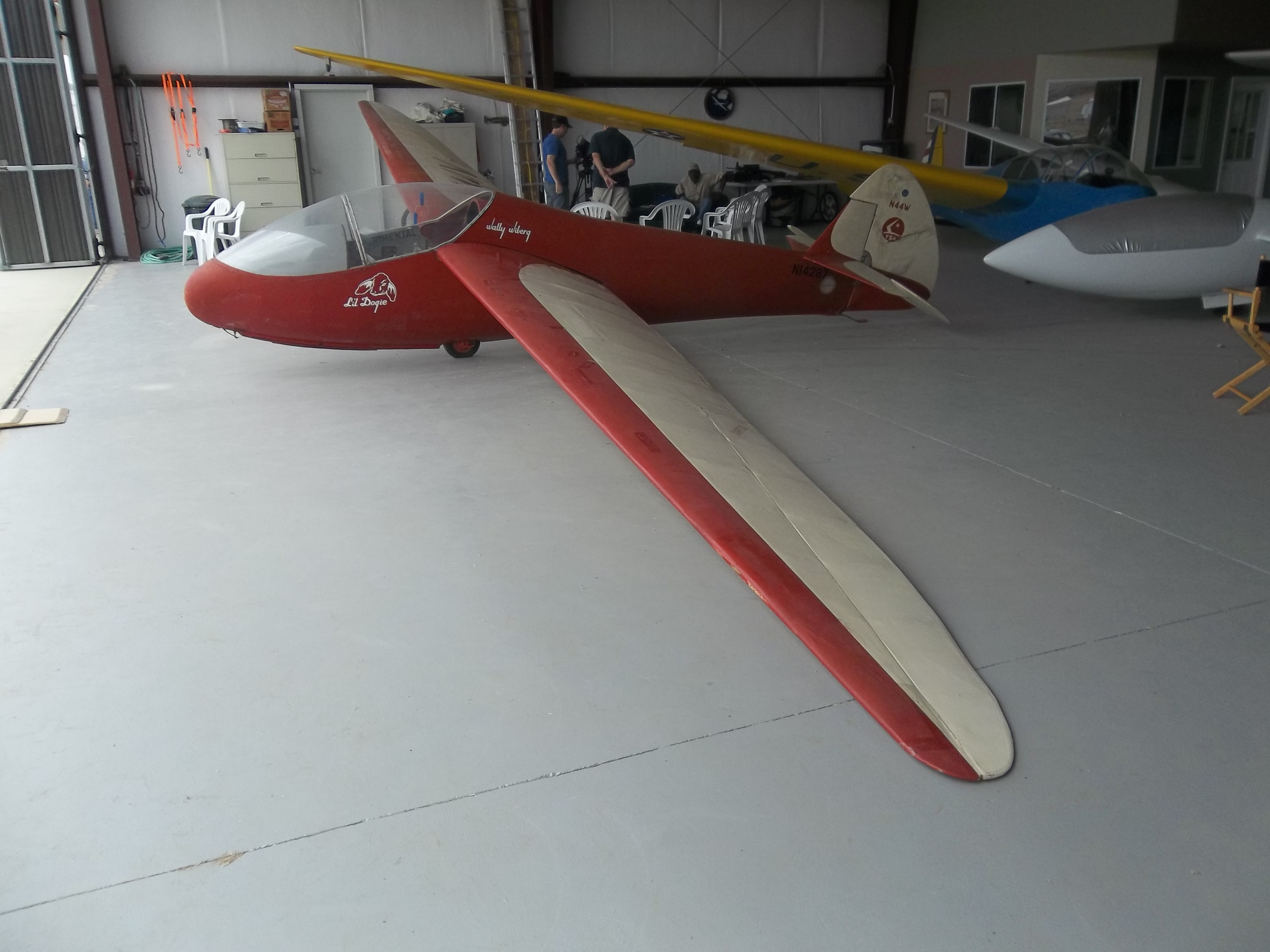
- Crown City Glider Club Screaming Wiener, later renamed "Lil Dogie" photographed at Mountain Valley Airport on 31 August 2013

General information
- Type: Glider
- National origin: United States
- Manufacturer: Crown City Glider Club
- Designer: Walter Burke, Irv Culver and Wallace Neugent
- Status: Production completed
- Number built: One

History
- Introduction date: 1946
- Developed from: Culver Dingbat
- Variant: Culver Rigid Midget

The Crown City Glider Club Screaming Wiener is an American mid-wing, single-seat glider that was designed and built by members of the Crown City Glider Club in 1938.

== Design and development ==
The Screaming Wiener was designed and built by Walter Burke, Irv Culver and Wallace Neugent in 1938 as an improved version of the Dingbat. The aircraft is made from wood, with the fuselage a wooden monocoque structure and the wings and tail surfaces wooden structures covered in doped aircraft fabric covering.

The aircraft's dimensions were determined by the building space available. The wings were limited to a 36 ft (11.0 m) span by the length of the garage they were built in. The resulting aircraft is small, but has good penetration and maneuverability, with a glide ratio of 21:1.

Only one Screaming Wiener was built.

== Operational history ==
The aircraft was flown by Ray Parker in the 1946 US Nationals, coming in second. Parker then sold the aircraft to Paul MacCready who also flew it to second place in the 1947 US Nationals, beating Parker that year, who placed third in the Culver Rigid Midget. MacCready also set a world out and return record at the competition.

The Wiener was then sold to Wally Wiberg who carried out an aerodynamic clean-up on it and renamed it Li'l Dogie. After Wiberg died the aircraft was donated to a museum, who later sold it. MacCready then bought it and was reported in 1983 by Soaring Magazine as planning a complete restoration of the aircraft.

In September 2012 the Wiener was still on the US Federal Aviation Administration registry and owned by Douglas Fronius of Poway, California. The aircraft is officially registered as a Crown City Robertson and is in the Experimental - Certification compliance category.

== Specifications (Screaming Wiener) ==
Data from Sailplane Directory and Soaring

General characteristics

- Crew: one
- Wingspan: 36 ft 0 in (10.97 m)
- Wing area: 97 sq ft (9.0 m^{2})
- Aspect ratio: 14:1
- Empty weight: 290 lb (132 kg)
- Gross weight: 475 lb (215 kg)

Performance

- Maximum glide ratio: 21:1
- Rate of sink: 306 ft/min (1.55 m/s)
- Wing loading: 4.9 lb/sq ft (24 kg/m^{2})

== See also ==
Related lists

- List of gliders
