= Laron Wizard =

American homebuilt airplane

Wizard

General information
- Type: Homebuilt aircraft
- National origin: United States
- Manufacturer: Laron Aviation Tech
- Status: Production completed
- Number built: 220 (1998)

The Laron Wizard is an American homebuilt aircraft produced by Laron Aviation Tech of Borger, Texas. When it was available the aircraft was supplied as a kit for amateur construction.

== Design and development ==
The Wizard features a strut-braced high-wing, a twin-boom tail layout, a two-seats-in-side-by-side configuration enclosed cockpit, fixed tricycle landing gear, with a tail skid, and a single engine in pusher configuration.

The aircraft is made from a combination of bolted-together aluminum tubing and fiberglass, with its flying surfaces covered doped aircraft fabric. Its 30.50 ft (9.3 m) span wing, mounts flaps and has a wing area of 140.0 sq ft (13.01 m^{2}). The wing is supported by a single lift strut and jury strut per side. The acceptable power range is 64 to 80 hp (48 to 60 kW) and the standard engines used are the 64 hp (48 kW) Rotax 582, the 74 hp (55 kW) Rotax 618 or the 65 hp (48 kW) Hirth 2706 two stroke powerplants or the 80 hp (60 kW) Rotax 912UL four stroke engine.

With the Rotax 582 engine the Wizard has a typical empty weight of 462 lb (210 kg) and a gross weight of 925 lb (420 kg), giving a useful load of 463 lb (210 kg). With full fuel of 10 U.S. gallons (38 L; 8.3 imp gal) the payload for pilot, passengers and baggage is 403 lb (183 kg).

The manufacturer estimated the construction time from the supplied kit as 450 hours.

== Operational history ==
By 1998 the company reported that 240 kits had been sold and 220 aircraft were completed and flying.

== Specifications (Wizard) ==
Data from AeroCrafter

General characteristics

- Crew: one
- Capacity: one passenger
- Length: 19 ft 7.2 in (5.974 m)
- Wingspan: 30 ft 6 in (9.30 m)
- Wing area: 140.0 sq ft (13.01 m^{2})
- Empty weight: 462 lb (210 kg)
- Gross weight: 925 lb (420 kg)
- Fuel capacity: 10 U.S. gallons (38 L; 8.3 imp gal)
- Powerplant: 1 × Rotax 582 twin cylinder, liquid-cooled, two stroke aircraft engine, 64 hp (48 kW)
- Propellers: 2-bladed composite

Performance

- Maximum speed: 120 mph (190 km/h, 100 kn)
- Cruise speed: 90 mph (140 km/h, 78 kn)
- Range: 270 mi (430 km, 230 nmi)
- Service ceiling: 15,000 ft (4,600 m)
- Rate of climb: 1,350 ft/min (6.9 m/s)
- Wing loading: 6.6 lb/sq ft (32 kg/m^{2})

== See also ==
- Ultralite Soaring Wizard, a different aircraft with the same model name
