= Delta Sailplane Nomad =

Honcho and Nomad

General information
- Type: Ultralight aircraft and motorglider
- National origin: United States
- Manufacturer: Delta Sailplane Corporation
- Status: Production completed

History
- Developed from: Volmer VJ-24W SunFun

The Delta Sailplane Honcho and Delta Sailplane Nomad are a family of American ultralight aircraft and motorgliders that were derived from the Volmer VJ-24W SunFun and produced by the Delta Sailplane Corporation. The aircraft were supplied as kits for amateur construction.

== Design and development ==
The Nomad and Honcho were both designed to comply with the US FAR 103 Ultralight Vehicles rules, including the category's maximum empty weight of 254 lb (115 kg). Both have a standard empty weight of 189 lb (86 kg). They feature a strut-braced high-wing, a single-seat, open cockpit, and a single engine in pusher configuration. The Nomad is the motorglider version with monowheel gear and a longer wing, while the Honcho has tricycle landing gear and a shorter wing.

Both the aircraft are made from bolted-together aluminum tubing, with the wings and tail surfaces covered in doped aircraft fabric covering. The high wing is supported by V-struts with jury struts. The pilot sits on an open seat with no windshield. Engines used include the 26 hp (19 kW) Lloyd DS1, 28 hp (21 kW) Lloyd DS2, and the 18 hp (13 kW) Solo 210.

The assembly time is 120–150 hours.

== Variants ==
Honcho
Tricycle landing gear version with nosewheel steering, an auxiliary tailwheel, and a 32.2 ft (9.8 m) span wing.
Nomad
Monowheel gear version with a 36.1 ft (11.0 m) span wing, wing area of 147 sq ft (13.7 m^{2}), wing loading of 2.77 lb/sq ft (13.5 kg/m^{2}) and a cruise speed of 55 mph (89 km/h).

== Specifications (Honcho) ==
Data from Cliche and Virtual Ultralight Museum

General characteristics

- Crew: one
- Length: 18.5 ft (5.6 m)
- Wingspan: 32.2 ft (9.8 m)
- Wing area: 131 sq ft (12.2 m^{2})
- Empty weight: 189 lb (86 kg)
- Gross weight: 407 lb (185 kg)
- Fuel capacity: 2.5 U.S. gallons (9.5 L; 2.1 imp gal)
- Powerplant: 1 × Lloyd DS1 , 26 hp (19 kW)

Performance

- Maximum speed: 60 mph (97 km/h, 52 kn)
- Stall speed: 27 mph (43 km/h, 23 kn)
- Endurance: 2.0 hours
- Rate of climb: 620 ft/min (3.1 m/s)
- Wing loading: 3.1 lb/sq ft (15 kg/m^{2})
