= Dallach Sunwheel =

Sunwheel
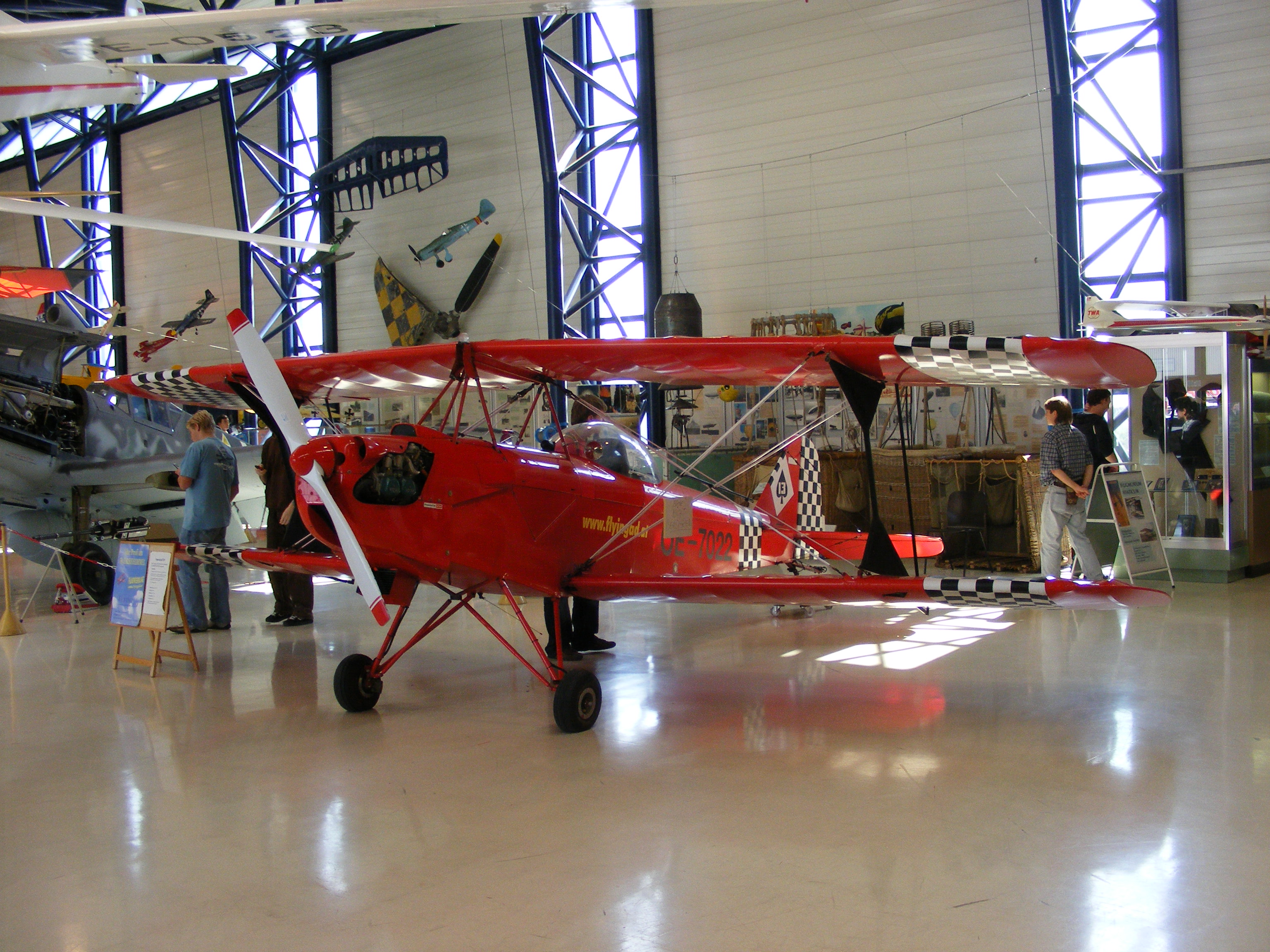

General information
- Type: Two seat sport kit built biplane
- National origin: Germany
- Manufacturer: WD Flugzeug Leichtbau; UL-Jih Sedláĉek Spol s.r.o.
- Designer: Wolfgang Dallach
- Status: In production
- Number built: at least 48 built or under construction

The Dallach D.3 Sunwheel, also known as the WDFL Sunwheel and more recently the Fascination Sunwheel, is a fully aerobatic, single-engine, two-seat biplane, homebuilt from kits. It was designed and marketed in Germany.

== Design and development ==
This Wolfgang Dallach design, like his Dallach Sunrise, was marketed by WD Flugzeug Leichtbau (WDFL), the kits at least partly built in the Czech Republic by UL-Jih Sedláĉek Spol s.r.o. The Sunwheel is constructed from metal tube and is fabric covered. It is a single bay biplane with a single I-form, faired interplane strut on each side. The wings are both swept and staggered. There are ailerons on both upper and lower wings, externally interconnected. Cabane struts support the upper wing over the tandem, open cockpits. The Sunwheel has a fixed tailwheel undercarriage, with the mainwheels hinged from the fuselage on V-form, cross-connected struts. Some Sunwheels have wheel fairings.

The Sunwheel is usually powered either by a 60 kW (80 hp) Rotax 912 UL flat four or a 48 kW (65 hp) Sauer ULM 2000 engine.

== Operational history ==
48 Sunwheels appeared in mid-2010 on the civil registers of European countries excluding Russia.

Reviewer Marino Boric said of the design in a 2015 review, "its sturdiness and its relatively low speeds make it practically indestructible in flight, though you will need something more powerful than a Rotax 912to make the most of its abilities."

== Specifications (Rotax 912UL) ==
Data from Airelife's World Aircraft

General characteristics

- Crew: one
- Capacity: one passenger
- Length: 5.7 m (18 ft 8 in)
- Wingspan: 7.0 m (23 ft 0 in)
- Height: 2.2 m (7 ft 3 in)
- Max takeoff weight: 450 kg (992 lb)
- Powerplant: 1 × Rotax 912UL four cylinder horizontally opposed four stroke, air- and water-cooled, 60 kW (80 hp)

Performance

- Maximum speed: 145 km/h (90 mph, 78 kn)
- Cruise speed: 130 km/h (81 mph, 70 kn)
- Range: 350 km (220 mi, 190 nmi)
- Rate of climb: 0.62 m/s (122 ft/min) initial
