= Maupin Woodstock One =

American glider

Woodstock One
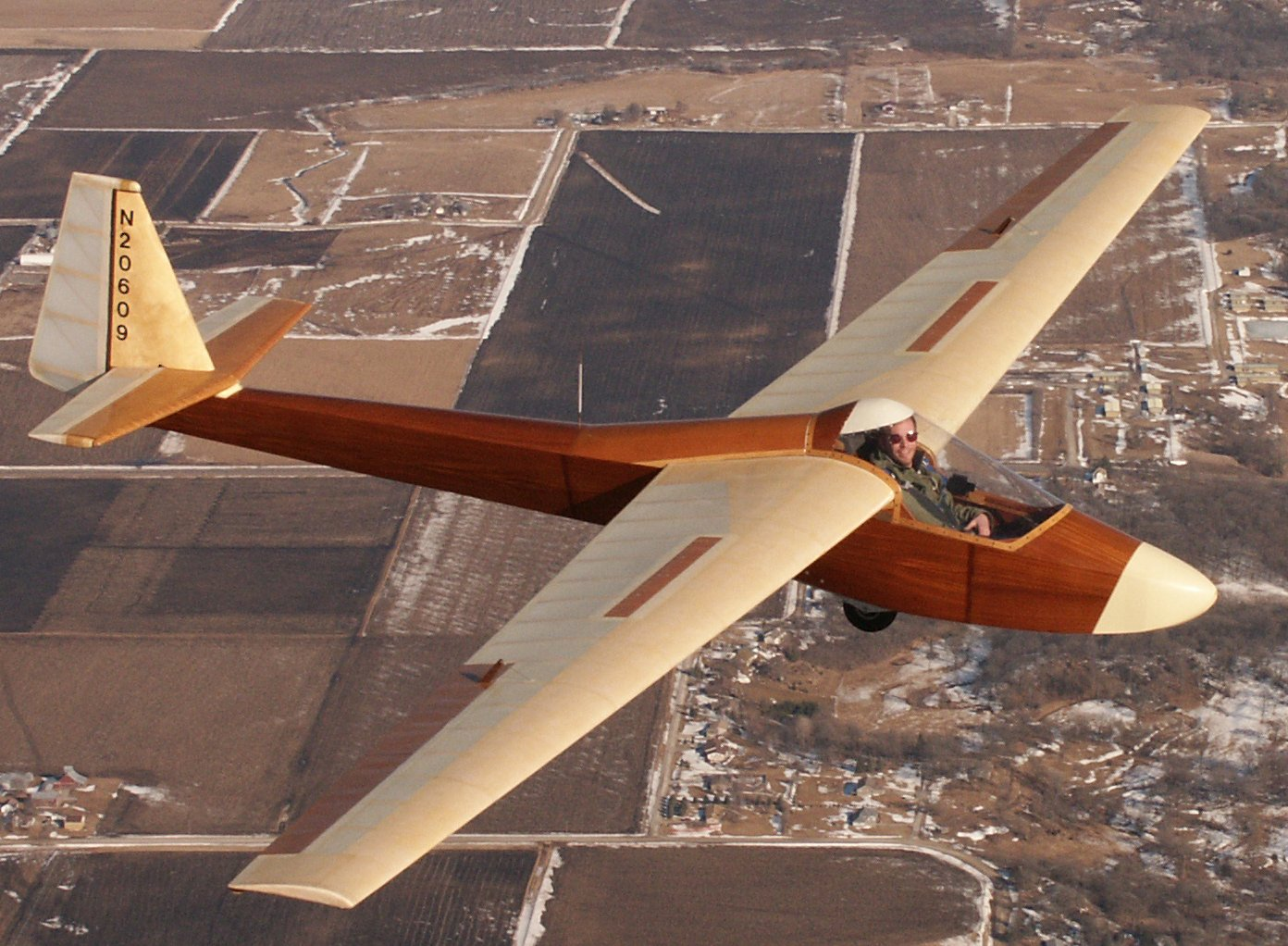

General information
- Type: Glider
- National origin: United States
- Designer: Jim Maupin
- Number built: over 350 sets of plans sold, 12 aircraft completed (1983)

History
- First flight: 1978

The Maupin Woodstock One is an American high-wing, single-seat glider designed by Jim Maupin and made available as plans for amateur construction.

== Design and development ==
The Woodstock was designed in the late 1970s by Maupin, with assistance from Irv Culver, who designed the airfoil for the wing. Culver's airfoil is of 18% thickness at the root, thinning to 13% thickness at the wing tip and incorporates no washout.

The aircraft's design goals were low cost and simplicity of construction. Four design principles were employed: using the least expensive materials, using as little material as possible, keeping the design simple and utilizing as many common parts as possible. The resulting airframe is all-wood, with the major structural parts fabricated from Douglas fir. The tail and wing covering are birch. The wing and tailplane ribs are made in pairs from marine-grade fir plywood using a bandsaw. The wing spar is a hollow box for the first 8 ft (2.4 m) from the root and then changes to a "C-section" outboard. Top surface spoilers are provided.

The main landing gear is an 11 in (28 cm) go-cart wheel mounted as a fixed monowheel, with a brake fashioned from aluminium sheet and employed as a band brake, actuated by a bicycle brake lever mounted on the control stick.

== Operational history ==
The Woodstock won first place in the 1984 Sailplane Homebuilders Association design contest.

In 1998 Gary Osoba won the US Region 9 Sports Class contest in his Woodstock. In April 1998, Osoba earned US National and World Records in the Ultralight Category for Straight Distance, Distance to a Goal, and Distance up to Three Turnpoints for a flight of 340 miles in his Woodstock. In August 2000 Osoba set the US National and World Record for the Ultralight Category for speed around a 100 km (62 mi) triangle of 52.4 mph (84 km/h) in his Woodstock. Also in August 2000, Osoba flew his Woodstock to a US National and World Record for Out and Return Distance of 162.09 mi (261 km). In July 2008 Osoba flew his Woodstock on a flight of over 791 km (492 mi) from Zapata, Texas to northeast of Lubbock, Texas, likely the longest distance flight ever achieved in a Woodstock. The flight was not documented to World Record standards but beat the standing Ultralight Free Distance World Record by nearly 175 km (109 mi).

In May 2002 Matt Michael established 7 Iowa State Records for Distance to a Declared goal for a flight of 233.81 mi (376 km) in his Woodstock. In May 2003 Michael established 10 Iowa State Records for Triangle Distance and Distance up to 3 Turnpoints for a flight of 252.56 mi (406 km) in his Woodstock. In that same flight, he set the Iowa State Altitude and Altitude Gain records at 11,200 ft (3,414 m) and 8,400 ft (2,560 m), respectively.

== Variants ==
Woodstock One
Original prototype with 39 ft (11.9 m) wingspan.
Woodstock (12.5m)
Version with 41.5 ft (12.6 m) wingspan.
Woodstock (13m)
Version with 43 ft (13.1 m) wingspan.

== Specifications (prototype) ==
Data from Sailplane Directory and Soaring

General characteristics

- Crew: one
- Wingspan: 39 ft 0 in (11.89 m)
- Wing area: 104.7 sq ft (9.73 m^{2})
- Aspect ratio: 14.5:1
- Airfoil: Culver 18%-13% custom
- Empty weight: 235 lb (107 kg)
- Gross weight: 450 lb (204 kg)

Performance

- Maximum glide ratio: 24:1
- Wing loading: 4.2 lb/sq ft (21 kg/m^{2})

== See also ==
- List of gliders
