= Daimler G.I =

German WW1 bomber

G.I / G.II
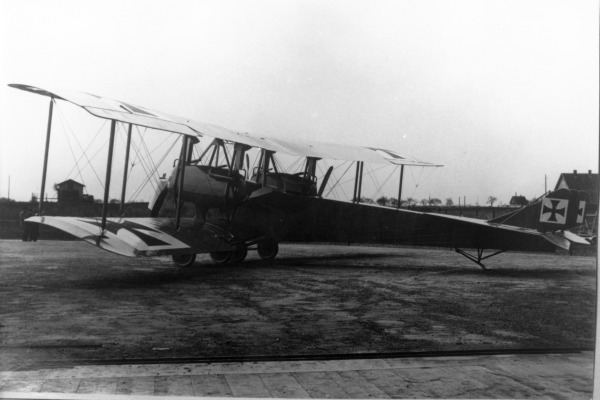
- Daimler G.II

General information
- Type: Bomber
- National origin: Germany
- Manufacturer: Daimler Motorengesellschsft Werke
- Designer: Baurat Rittberger and Ing. Karl Schopper
- Number built: 8

History
- First flight: late 1915
- Developed from: Union G.I

The Daimler G.I, originally designated Daimler R.I, was a bomber aircraft designed and built in Germany from early in 1915.

== Design and development ==
When the Daimler works entered the aircraft manufacture business they ordered a Union G.I from Union Flugzeugbau, which flew but disintegrated shortly before landing during a test-flight, due to severe engine vibrations. Daimler commenced to re-design the Union G.I, resulting in the Daimler R.I.

Development of the Daimler bombers was accelerated by the use of former Union designers Baurat Rittberger and Ing. Karl Schopper, who proceeded to strengthen the structure and replace the Union G.Is troublesome inverted engines with upright Mercedes D.IIIs. Assembly of the R.Is and R.IIs took place at Sindelfingen, but most of the R.I and R.ll parts were built by the Stuttgart firm of Schiedmayer and taken to Sindelfingen for assembly.

Flight trials commenced late in 1915 with relatively few engine problems but the structure had to be strengthened several times and three wing arrangements were also tested between 1915 and 1917. A second R.I was built with a larger tail unit to improve directional control. Daimler also built six almost identical improved R.II aircraft in 1916, two of which flew, the remaining four being crated and stored.

The airframe of the R.I and R.II was typical of large German aircraft of the time, with a wooden fuselage and metal wings covered with fabric. The fuselage housed the crew in a gunners cockpit in the nose, cockpit amidships and a gunner's cockpit aft of the wings. The tail-unit consisted of a tailplane which supported a fin and rudder as well as two additional rudders at approximately half span. The undercarriage comprised a twin nose-wheel assembly, four main-wheels spread between the engine nacelles on the lower wings and a tail-skid. Engines were initially in tandem push-pull nacelles mounted directly on the lower wing, changing to streamlined nacelles mounted on struts mid gap on the R.II.

Poor performance and competition from similar aircraft precluded production, but at least one R.I and two R.IIs were accepted by Idflieg and test flown until the middle of 1917.

== Variants ==
Daimler R.I
The initial designation of the G.I, changed after discovery that the aircraft did not meet one of the major criteria for being designated as a Riesenflugzeug; the engines were unable to be serviced whilst in flight.
Daimler R.II
The initial designation of the G.II, which was a refined version of the G.I, with improved structure and higher maximum weight and more streamlined engine nacelles supported on pylons between the wings.
Daimler G.I
The R.I re-designated.
Daimler G.II
The R.II re-designated.

== Specifications ( Daimler R.II) ==
Data from The German Giants

General characteristics

- Crew: ca. 5
- Length: 18.4 m (60 ft 4 in)
- Wingspan: 21.26 m (69 ft 9 in)
- Height: 3.8 m (12 ft 6 in)
- Wing area: 74.8 m^{2} (805 sq ft)
- Empty weight: 2,540 kg (5,600 lb)
- Gross weight: 3,680 kg (8,113 lb)
- Powerplant: 4 × Mercedes D.III 6 cyl. Water-cooled in-line piston engine, 119.3 kW (160.0 hp) each

Performance

- Maximum speed: 123 km/h (76 mph, 66 kn)
- Cruise speed: 120 km/h (75 mph, 65 kn)
- Service ceiling: 3,000 m (9,800 ft)
- Rate of climb: 1.1 m/s (220 ft/min)
- Time to altitude: 1,500m (4,921ft) in 25 min
- Wing loading: 49.3 kg/m^{2} (10.1 lb/sq ft)

== See also ==
Aircraft of comparable role, configuration, and era

- Union G.I
- Albatros G.I

Related lists

- List of aircraft
