= UL-Jih Evolution =

Czech ultralight aircraft

Evolution

General information
- Type: Two seat ultralight/kitbuilt
- National origin: Czech Republic
- Manufacturer: UL-Jih Sedláĉek Spol s.r.o.
- Designer: Jaroslav Sedláĉek
- Number built: at least six by 2005

History
- First flight: 16 February 2002

The UL-Jih Evolution is a conventionally laid out, two-seat, high-wing, single-engine ultralight, designed and built in the Czech Republic. Two variants were available in 2010.

== Design and development ==
The first version of the Evolution, originally designed by Jaroslav Sedláĉek of the Czech company UL-Jih was marketed by WD Flugzeugleichtbau of Germany as the Dallach D.5 Evolution with series production starting in 2002. UL-Jih fabricated both this model and the earlier D.4 Fascination and claimed sole production and marketing rights to both when WD Flugzeugleichtbau ceased trading in 2005, though those rights are challenged by Swiss Light Aircraft AG who build their own versions.

The Evolution is an all-composite aircraft, which uses the same cantilever wings, control surfaces and empennage as the Fascination but has a high-wing configuration, rather than the latter's low wing. The wing is of trapezoidal plan, with ailerons that have external balance trim tabs and sealed nosegaps. Inboard, there are electrically operated Fowler flaps. The fuselage becomes slender towards the tail, where the trapezoidal tailplane is set at mid-height, the elevators having a small cutout for rudder movement. The fin is swept but the rudder has vertical edges; it extends to the bottom of the fuselage. The underwing cabin seats two in side-by-side configuration, with access via glazed side doors. The Evolution has a retractable tricycle undercarriage; all three legs retract rearwards into the fuselage, on which they are mounted. A ballistic recovery parachute is available as an option.

The Evolution may be powered either by a 73.5 kW (98.6 hp) Rotax 912ULS or a 59.6 kW (79.9 hp) Rotax 912UL.

== Operational history ==
At least six Evolutions had been built by the time WD ceased trading in 2005 and 15 appeared on the mid-2010 civil registers of European countries, excluding Russia.

== Variants ==
E80
Rotax 912UL engine.
E100
Rotax 912ULS engine.

== Specifications (E100) ==
Data from Jane's All the World's Aircraft 2011/12

General characteristics

- Capacity: two
- Length: 6.98 m (22 ft 11 in)
- Wingspan: 9.00 m (29 ft 6 in)
- Height: 2.10 m (6 ft 11 in)
- Wing area: 10.76 m^{2} (115.8 sq ft) gross
- Empty weight: 305 kg (672 lb)
- Max takeoff weight: 472.5 kg (1,042 lb)
- Fuel capacity: 120 L (31.7 US gal; 26.4 Imp gal)
- Powerplant: 1 × Rotax 912ULS Four cylinder four stroke, air- and water-cooled, 73.5 kW (98.6 hp) geared down 1.43:1
- Propellers: 3-bladed Rospeller constant speed

Performance

- Maximum speed: 290 km/h (180 mph, 160 kn)
- Cruise speed: 270 km/h (170 mph, 150 kn)
- Stall speed: 65 km/h (40 mph, 35 kn) flaps extended
- Range: 1,400 km (870 mi, 760 nmi) with maximum fuel
- Service ceiling: 4,570 m (14,990 ft)
- g limits: +4.0/-2.0
- Rate of climb: 8.5 m/s (1,670 ft/min) maximum at sea level
