= US Aviation Super Floater =

American homebuilt glider

Super Floater

General information
- Type: Glider
- National origin: United States
- Manufacturer: US Aviation; Wind Walker Aircraft Co
- Designer: Klaus Hill and Larry Hall
- Status: Production completed

History
- Introduction date: early 1970s
- First flight: 1970

The US Aviation Super Floater (also called the SuperFloater and Superfloater) is an American high-wing, strut-braced, single-seat glider that was designed by Klaus Hill and Larry Hall and produced by US Aviation initially, and later by Wind Walker Aircraft Co. It first flew in 1970.

== Design and development ==
The Super Floater is an ultralight sailplane that is designed for fun flying, rather than competition, and as such it has a glide ratio of just 15:1. It is very similar to the primary gliders of the 1930s in concept, performance and appearance. Designed to fit into the US FAR 103 Ultralight Vehicles regulations, most are not registered with the Federal Aviation Administration. Most were factory built and delivered completed and ready to fly, although some may have been completed as homebuilt aircraft.

The aircraft is made from aluminium tube, covered with Dacron. Its 38-foot-span (11.6 m) wing is braced by twin "V" struts and jury struts. The cruciform tail is strut-braced. The controls consist of a side stick and rudder pedals. The landing gear is a monowheel gear, mounted directly behind the pilot. A ballistic parachute was factory-optional equipment.

The aircraft was initially produced by US Aviation in the early 1970s, but production ended in the 1980s. It was briefly re-introduced by Wind Walker Aircraft Co in 1995, following a redesign, with US Aviation as distributor for US$5,995 fully assembled.

== Operational history ==
In about 1994 Dave Chapman flew a Super Floater to an altitude of 12,500 ft (3,810 m) in mountain wave lift north of Salt Lake City, Utah.

== Specifications (Super Floater) ==
Data from Sailplane Directory and Hang Gliding Magazine

General characteristics

- Crew: one
- Wingspan: 38 ft (12 m)
- Wing area: 168 sq ft (15.6 m^{2})
- Aspect ratio: 8.4:1
- Empty weight: 179 lb (81 kg)
- Gross weight: 400 lb (181 kg)

Performance

- Stall speed: 23 mph (37 km/h, 20 kn)
- Never exceed speed: 60 mph (97 km/h, 52 kn)
- Maximum glide ratio: 15:1 at 35 mph (56 km/h)
- Rate of sink: 180 ft/min (0.9 m/s)

== See also ==
Aircraft of comparable role, configuration, and era

- Sandlin Bug
- Sandlin Goat
- Volmer VJ-23 Swingwing
- Volmer VJ-24W SunFun

Related lists

- List of gliders
