= Volmer VJ-23 Swingwing =

American glider

VJ-23 Swingwing
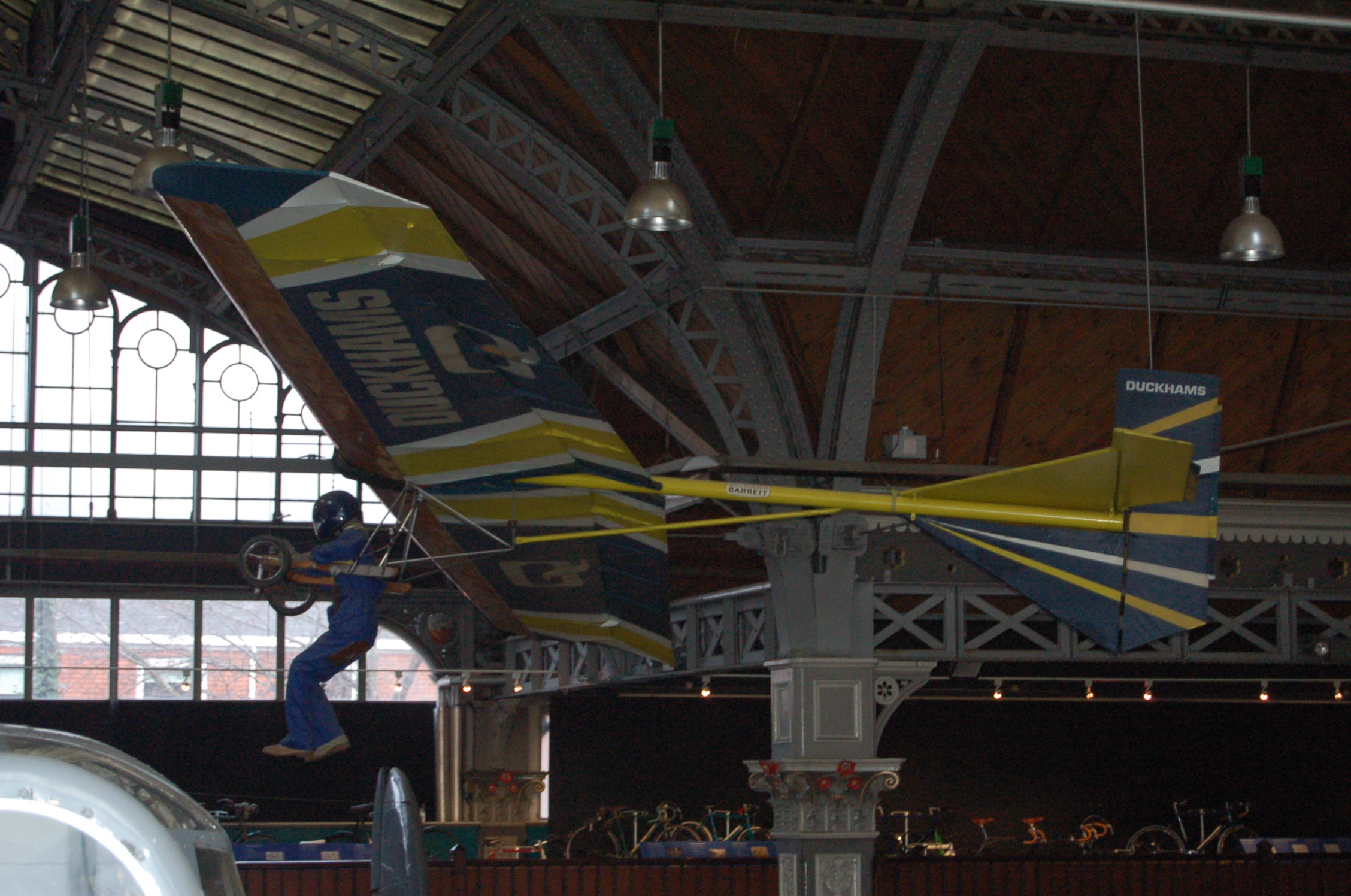

General information
- Type: Glider
- National origin: United States
- Manufacturer: Volmer Aircraft
- Designer: Irv Culver
- Status: Production completed
- Number built: 3 (1974)

History
- Introduction date: 1971
- First flight: late 1971
- Variant: Volmer VJ-24 SunFun

The Volmer VJ-23 Swingwing is an American high-wing, single-seat, foot launched glider that was designed by Irv Culver and built by Volmer Jensen and supplied as plans by his company Volmer Aircraft for amateur construction. Kits were also available from DSK Aircraft.

== Design and development ==
The prototype VJ-23 was completed late in 1971 and in an era when foot-launched aircraft were Rogallo-style hang gliders, the VJ-23 was described as more of a foot-launched sailplane, with three axis controls. Jensen and Culver collaborated on the design from a concern about the safety of weight shift hang gliders as well as their structural integrity.

The aircraft is predominantly made from wood and covered in doped Ceconite. The wing leading edge is made from poplar plywood and supported by nose ribs made from marine-grade plywood. The wing spar cap strips and tail ribs are fashioned from spruce. The tailboom is an aluminium tube. Its wing is cantilevered and tapered from wing root to wing tip. The VJ-23 lands and takes off on foot, but the aircraft is equipped with small wheels to allow it to be pulled up a hill. The aircraft's rigid wing structure requires that it be transported in a trailer, rather than rolled up and carried on a roof rack like a hang glider.

To make construction easier and quicker the design was developed into the aluminium tube, strut-braced Volmer VJ-24 SunFun.

Both the glider and powered VJ-24E version proved popular and a large number were built.

== Operational history ==
One VJ-23E was flown across the English Channel.

== Variants ==
VJ-23
Glider version
VJ-23E
Powered version with a pusher configuration McCulloch 101MC engine mounted on a pylon above the wing and a Culver-designed propeller.

== Aircraft on display ==
- EAA AirVenture Museum

== Specifications (VJ-23E) ==
Data from EAA

General characteristics

- Crew: one
- Length: 17 ft 5 in (5.31 m)
- Wingspan: 32 ft 7 in (9.93 m)
- Height: 6 ft 0 in (1.83 m)
- Empty weight: 100 lb (45 kg)
- Powerplant: 1 × McCulloch 101MC
- Propellers: 2-bladed Culver wooden propeller

== See also ==
- Volmer VJ-24W SunFun

Related lists

- List of gliders
