= Ultralite Soaring Wizard =

American ultralight airplane

Wizard
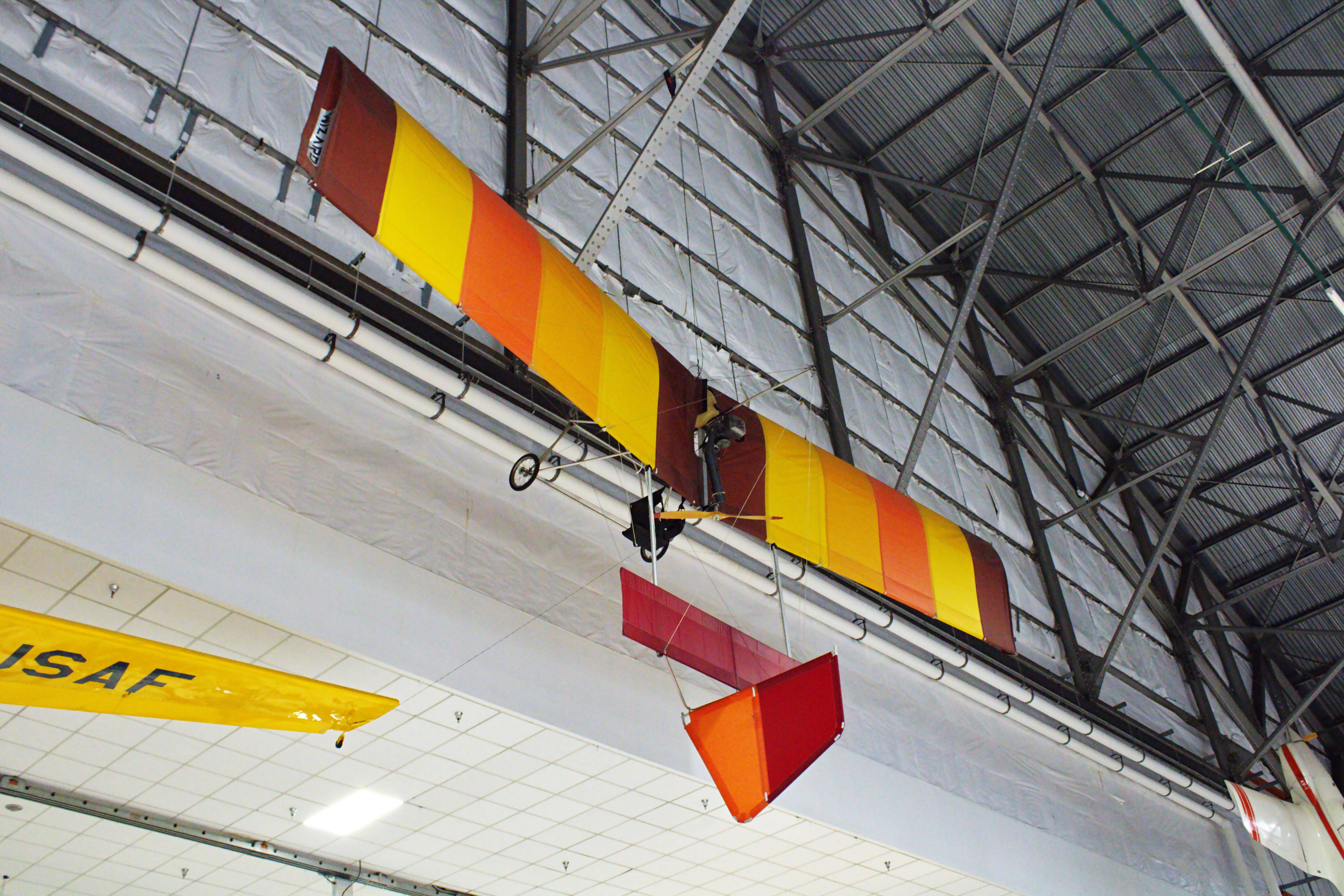
- Wizard J-3 on display at the Wings Over the Rockies Air and Space Museum

General information
- Type: Ultralight aircraft
- National origin: United States
- Manufacturer: Ultralite Soaring Inc
- Status: Production completed

History
- Developed from: Eipper Quicksilver E

The Ultralite Soaring Wizard is an American ultralight aircraft that was designed and produced by Ultralite Soaring Inc. The aircraft was supplied as a kit for amateur construction.

== Design and development ==
Developed from the Eipper Quicksilver E, the Wizard was designed before the introduction of the US FAR 103 Ultralight Vehicles rules, but complies with them, including the category's maximum empty weight of 254 lb (115 kg). The W1 model has a standard empty weight of 167 lb (76 kg). It features a cable-braced high-wing, a single-seat, open cockpit, tricycle landing gear and a single engine in pusher configuration. It differs from the Quicksilver primarily in the configuration of the tail boom tubes and the use of drooped wing tips.

The Wizard is made from bolted-together aluminum tubing, with its flying surfaces covered in Dacron sailcloth. Its single-surface 32.3 ft (9.8 m) span wing has its cabling supported by a single tube style kingpost. The landing gear uses tube flexing for suspension and features a fixed nose wheel. On the early models the pilot is accommodated on a sling seat suspended from the main wing keel tube, to allow weight-shift control. The standard engine supplied was the single cylinder, two-stroke Yamaha KT-100S of 15 hp (11 kW), although a Kawasaki 440 snowmobile engine producing 38 hp (28 kW) was optional.

The Wizard was commercially successful and a large number were completed and flown. Construction time from the supplied assembly kit is about 100 hours.

== Variants ==
Wizard W1
Initial model with a weight-shift control system and no aerodynamic controls.
Wizard J2
Improved model with a hybrid control system, utilizing weight-shift plus spoilers for roll control and an elevator for pitch control.
Wizard J-3
Three axis control version with elevator, rudder and spoilers. Standard powerplant supplied was the Kawasaki 440 snowmobile engine producing 38 hp (28 kW). This model introduced a fixed seat, steerable nose wheel and brakes. Empty weight 250 lb (113 kg), gross weight 550 lb (249 kg). Very similar to the Eipper Quicksilver MX.
Wizard J-3 Magnum
Three axis control version with elevator, rudder and ailerons. Standard powerplant supplied was the Kawasaki 440 snowmobile engine producing 38 hp (28 kW).
Wizard T3
Two seat model.

== Aircraft on display ==
- Museo del Aire, Madrid, Spain - T3 two seat model

== Specifications (Wizard W1) ==
Data from Cliche and the Virtual Ultralight Museum

General characteristics

- Crew: one
- Length: 17 ft (5.2 m)
- Wingspan: 32 ft 4 in (9.86 m)
- Height: 10.2 ft (3.1 m)
- Wing area: 162 sq ft (15.1 m^{2})
- Empty weight: 167 lb (76 kg)
- Gross weight: 450 lb (204 kg)
- Fuel capacity: 3.2 U.S. gallons (12 L; 2.7 imp gal)
- Powerplant: 1 × Yamaha KT-100S single cylinder, two-stroke kart engine, 15 hp (11 kW)

Performance

- Maximum speed: 42 mph (68 km/h, 36 kn)
- Cruise speed: 35 mph (56 km/h, 30 kn)
- Stall speed: 17 mph (27 km/h, 15 kn)
- Service ceiling: 12,500 ft (3,800 m)
- Maximum glide ratio: 9:1
- Rate of climb: 300 ft/min (1.5 m/s)

== See also ==
- Laron Wizard, a different aircraft with the same model name
