= Union G.I =

General information
- Type: Bomber
- National origin: Germany
- Manufacturer: Union Flugzeugwerke G.m.b.H., Teltow, Berlin
- Designer: Baurat Rittberger and Karl Schopper
- Number built: 2

History
- First flight: May 1915
- Variant: Daimler R.I

The Union G.I was a bomber aircraft designed and built in Germany from 1914.

== Union-Flugzeugwerke ==
Founded in 1912, the Union-Flugzeugwerke G.m.b.H. was founded at Teltow near Berlin by Karl Bomhard, who had previously participated in the design of the Lohner arrow-biplanes (Pfeilflieger) in Austria. Joined by Dr. Josef Sablatnig and Georg Konig, the Union Flugzeugbau constructed the Union arrow-biplanes based on Bomhard's designs form his time at Lohner. One of these aircraft won three world-altitude records with passengers for Germany in 1913.

== Union G.I development ==
Union engineers Baurat Rittberger and Karl Schopper began the design of a large four-engined bomber in 1914, classified in the Grossflugzeug category because the engines could not be serviced in flight. Constructed of wood with fabric covering, (some parts may have been plywood covered) and wire bracing. The tail unit comprised a single tailplane with elevator with a single fin carrying a rudder and two auxiliary rudders at approx half tailplane span.

At the successful Idflieg inspection on 13 April 1915, the airframe construction was described as good but the low cruising and maximum speeds were criticised as well as the disappointing useful load. Flight trials began in May 1915 but the first G.I was damaged and there is no evidence of further flying.

The second G.I named "Marga-Emmy" was ordered by Daimler to allow them to rapidly enter the aircraft market. The strengthened second G.I, stationed at Schneidemuhl, flew soon after but was destroyed just before landing on 1 September 1915 after experiencing extreme vibrations from the engines during flight. Development continued as the Daimler R.I but on 1 August 1916 the Union-Flugzeugwerke went into liquidation and its assets were taken over by the Norddeutsche Flugzeugwerke, which spent the remainder of the war years repairing aircraft.

== Specifications (Union G.I) ==
Data from The German Giants

General characteristics

- Crew: ca. 5
- Length: 18.2 m (59 ft 9 in)
- Wingspan: 21 m (68 ft 11 in)
- Height: 3.74 m (12 ft 3 in)
- Wing area: 72.4 m^{2} (779 sq ft)
- Empty weight: 1,960 kg (4,321 lb)
- Gross weight: 2,765 kg (6,096 lb)
- Powerplant: 4 × Mercedes Fh 1256 6 cyl. Inverted water-cooled in-line piston engine, 82 kW (110 hp) each

Performance

- Maximum speed: 128 km/h (80 mph, 69 kn)
- Cruise speed: 115 km/h (71 mph, 62 kn)
- Service ceiling: 3,500 m (11,500 ft)
- Rate of climb: 1.194 m/s (235.0 ft/min)
- Time to altitude: 1,500 m. (4,921 ft.) in 24.2 min
- Wing loading: 38.2 kg/m^{2} (7.8 lb/sq ft)

== See also ==
Aircraft of comparable role, configuration, and era

- Daimler R.I
- Albatros G.I

Related lists

- List of aircraft
