= U-Turn GmbH =

German aircraft manufacturer

- Company type: Gesellschaft mit beschränkter Haftung
- Industry: Aerospace
- Founded: 2002
- Founder: Thomas Vosseler and Ernst Strobl
- Headquarters: Tuningen, Germany
- Products: Paragliders
- Website: www.u-turn.de

U-Turn GmbH is a German aircraft manufacturer originally based in Villingen-Schwenningen and later in Tuningen. The company specializes in the design and manufacture of paragliders in the form of ready-to-fly aircraft, particularly for aerobatics.

The company was founded by Thomas Vosseler and Ernst Strobl in 2002. One early innovation was offering glider purchase financing through an owners' club.

U-Turn is organized as a Gesellschaft mit beschränkter Haftung (GmbH), a German Limited liability company.

The company's first product was the U-Turn Infinity, an intermediate glider designed for easy handling and safety. By 2016 they had a full line of gliders for all levels of pilots, plus aerobatics, including a two-place aerobatic glider, the U-Turn Twinforce.

== Aircraft ==
Summary of aircraft built by U-Turn GmbH:

- U-Turn Annapurna
- U-Turn Blacklight
- U-Turn Blackout
- U-Turn Emotion
- U-Turn Eternity
- U-Turn Everest
- U-Turn Evolution
- U-Turn Infinity
- U-Turn Lightning
- U-Turn Paramotion
- U-Turn Passenger
- U-Turn Redout
- U-Turn Trinity
- U-Turn Twinforce
