= Ultralight Design Atos Trike =

Czech ultralight aircraft

Atos Trike

General information
- Type: Ultralight trike
- National origin: Czech Republic
- Manufacturer: Ultralight Design SRO
- Status: In production (2018)

History
- Developed from: A-I-R Atos

The Ultralight Design Atos Trike is a Czech electric and petrol powered ultralight trike, designed and produced by Ultralight Design SRO of Cvikov. The aircraft is supplied complete and ready-to-fly.

== Design and development ==
The Atos Trike was designed to comply with the German 120 kg class and the US FAR 103 Ultralight Vehicles rules, including the category's maximum empty weight of 254 lb (115 kg).

The aircraft design features a cantilever A-I-R Atos rigid hang glider-style high-wing, weight-shift controls, a single-seat open cockpit with a cockpit fairing, tricycle landing gear and a single electric or piston engine in pusher configuration.

The aircraft fuselage is made from composites, with its double surface Atos wing made from carbon-fiber-reinforced polymer. The wing is supported by a single post, has a small horizontal tailplane and uses an "A" frame weight-shift control bar. The powerplant is a FlyEngine F200 piston engine or, optionally, a Flytec HPD electric motor.

The aircraft (less wing) has an empty weight of 46 kg (101 lb) and a weight of 80 kg (176 lb), with the wing fitted.

== Operational history ==
In reviewing the design in 2015, Dimitri Delemarle wrote, "Any trike specifically designed to motorize the fabulous Atos wing has to be a bit special and this machine does not disappoint...It is not cheap, but the price reflects the high-quality workmanship!"

== Specifications (Atos Trike) ==
Data from Tacke

General characteristics

- Crew: one
- Empty weight: 80 kg (176 lb)
- Powerplant: 1 × FlyEngine F200 aircraft engine
- Propellers: 2-bladed folding
