= Irv Culver =

American aeronautical engineer

- Born: May 11, 1911; Saugus, California
- Died: August 13, 1999 (aged 88); Bakersfield, California
- Engineering career
- Discipline: Aeronautics
- Employer: Lockheed

Irven Harold Culver (May 11, 1911 – August 13, 1999) was an American aeronautical engineer.

Most notable of all his accomplishments, Culver is credited for solving a fatal flaw in the Lockheed P-38, related to high-speed compressibility problems which killed a test pilot.

A humorous episode during World War II resulted in giving the very secret Lockheed Advanced Development Projects division the name "Skunk Works". A phone call from the U.S. Department of the Navy to W. A. "Dick" Pulver was misdirected to Irv Culver who answered the phone with "Skonk Works, inside man Culver" and the name stuck. Another variant of the story relates that the original Skunk Works was located in a circus tent adjacent to the Lockheed plastics fabrication facility which smelled bad and reminded the engineers of the L'il Abner comic strip. Reportedly, Culver showed up for work wearing a civil defense gas mask as a gag and when he answered the phone he said "Skonk Works" referring to the cartoon. "Kelly overheard him and chewed out Irv for ridicule: "Culver, you're fired," Johnson roared. "Get your ass out of my tent." Culver showed up for work the next day and Johnson never said a word. Kelly Johnson referred to Culver as "a brilliant designer" in his autobiography

Culver was interested in a variety of aircraft configurations and developed guidelines for laying out the twist distribution on tailless aircraft. He also helped to design an experimental helicopter, distinguished by a forward-sweeping blade, that was extremely easy to fly. In 1966, Culver, Thomas Hanson and Lance Hook were awarded a patent (US3261407) for a rigid rotor system which set world speed records for Lockheed helicopters and laid the foundation for aerobatic rotorcraft. It earned Culver the Dr. Alexander Klemin Award from the American Helicopter Society.

In recent years, Culver was noted by Dan Armstrong, President of Experimental Soaring Association, for his work with Jim Maupin designing gliders intended to be built by craftsmen from plans. Culver is a well-known aerodynamicist. He published a 13-page paper on the design analysis for the Windrose 15-meter glider that he designed with Maupin.

== Aircraft designs collaborated on ==
- Crown City Glider Club Screaming Wiener
- Lockheed P-38 Lightning
- Lockheed SR-71 Blackbird
- Maupin Carbon Dragon
- Maupin Windrose
- Maupin Woodstock One
- Volmer VJ-24W SunFun
- Bowlus BA-100 Baby Albatross Corrected horizontal stabilizer position, friction, and control stiffness issues.
