= UFO HeliThruster =

HeliThruster

General information
- Type: Two-seat autogyro
- National origin: New Zealand
- Manufacturer: Ultimate Flying Options

History
- First flight: 1993

The UFO HeliThruster is a two-seat autogyro designed and built by Ultimate Flying Options of New Zealand.

== Design and development ==
The HeliThruster was first flown in 1993 and the first exported in 1997. It is a conventional autogyro with side-by-side seating for two in a pod-like enclosed cabin. It is powered by a 122 kW (165 hp) Subaru EJ-25 engine driving a pusher propeller.

== Specifications ==
Data from UFO.

General characteristics

- Crew: two
- Height: 3.1 m (10 ft 2 in)
- Empty weight: 430 kg (950 lb)
- Gross weight: 725 kg (1,600 lb)
- Powerplant: 1 × Subaru EJ-25 , 122 kW (165 hp)
- Main rotor diameter: 8.83 m (29 ft 0 in)

Performance

- Maximum speed: 241 km/h (150 mph, 130 kn)
- Cruise speed: 160 km/h (100 mph, 87 kn)
- Range: 960 km (600 mi, 520 nmi)
- Endurance: 6.5 hours
- Service ceiling: 3,048 m (10,000 ft)
- Rate of climb: 7.6 m/s (1,500 ft/min)
