= Uetz Pelikan =

Swiss aircraft

Pelikan
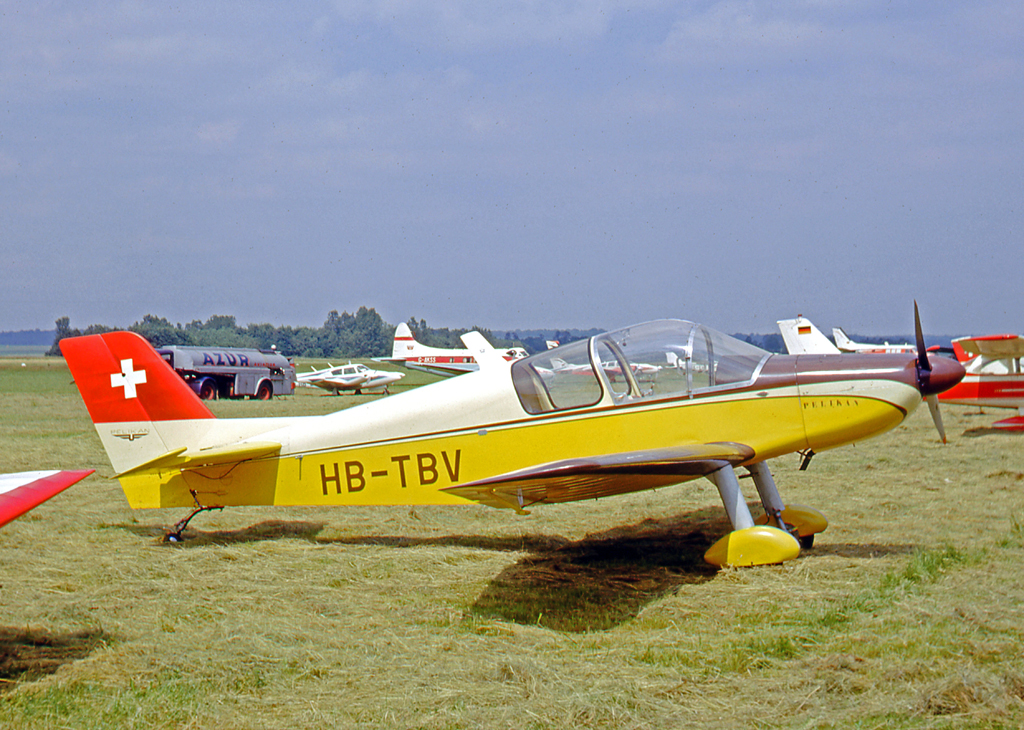
- Uetz U3M Pelikan at Toussus-le-Noble airfield near Paris in June 1965

General information
- Type: Four-seat cabin monoplane
- National origin: Switzerland
- Manufacturer: Walter Uetz Flugzeugbau
- Designer: Walter Uetz
- Number built: 5

History
- First flight: 21 May 1963
- Developed from: Uetz U2V

The Uetz Pelikan is a Swiss four-seat cabin monoplane designed for amateur construction by Walter Uetz.

== Design and development ==
The Pelikan is a four-seat development of the earlier Uetz U2V which had been based on the Jodel D.119. The prototype U3M Pelikan had four-seat cabin with a long transparent canopy. The fixed tail-wheel landing gear U3M is powered by a 135 hp (101 kW) Lycoming O-290 engine and the prototype first flew 21 May 1963, it was followed by a further prototype.

The production variant was designated the U4M which was re-engined with a 150 hp (112 kW) Lycoming O-320-A2B engine and the addition of flaps. The company built two aircraft and one other was amateur-built.

== Variants ==
U3M Pelikan
Prototype with a 135 hp (101 kW) Lycoming O-290 engine, two built.
U4M Pelikan
Production version with a 150 hp (112 kW) Lycoming O-320-A2B engine, two factory-built and one amateur-built.

== Specifications (U4M Pelikan) ==
Data from Jane's All The World's Aircraft 1965–66

General characteristics

- Crew: 1
- Capacity: 3 passengers
- Length: 7.50 m (24 ft 7 in)
- Wingspan: 9.60 m (31 ft 6 in)
- Height: 2.03 m (6 ft 8 in)
- Wing area: 13.2 m^{2} (142 sq ft)
- Empty weight: 566 kg (1,248 lb)
- Max takeoff weight: 1,000 kg (2,205 lb)
- Fuel capacity: 150 L (33 imp gal; 40 US gal)
- Powerplant: 1 × Lycoming O-320-A2B air-cooled flat-four, 110 kW (150 hp)
- Propellers: 2-bladed McCauley MGM-7460 fixed pitch

Performance

- Maximum speed: 219 km/h (136 mph, 118 kn)
- Cruise speed: 193 km/h (120 mph, 104 kn) (econ cruise)
- Stall speed: 66 km/h (41 mph, 36 kn)
- Never exceed speed: 290 km/h (180 mph, 160 kn)
- Range: 1,000 km (620 mi, 540 nmi) with max fuel
- Service ceiling: 4,800 m (15,700 ft)
- Rate of climb: 3.6 m/s (700 ft/min)
- Take-off run to 15 m (50 ft): 450 m (1,480 ft)
- Landing run from 15 m (50 ft): 380 m (1,250 ft)

== See also ==
Related development

- Jodel D.119
- Uetz U2V
