= Ultimate Aircraft 10 Dash =

10 Dash
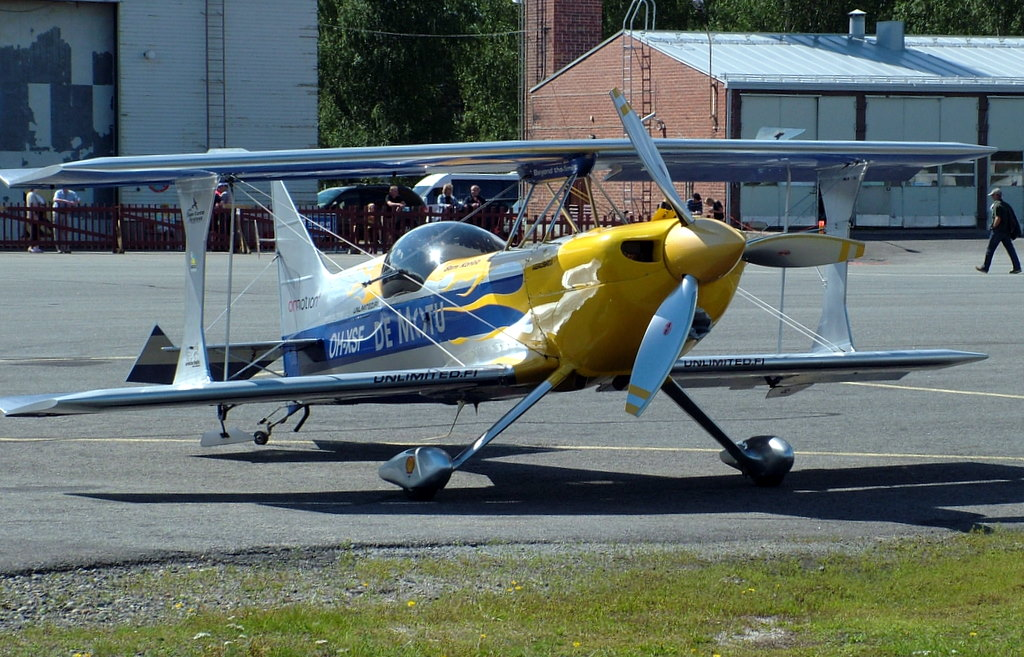

General information
- Type: Aerobatic sport biplane
- National origin: Canada
- Manufacturer: Ultimate Aircraft Corporation

History
- First flight: 6 October 1985

The Ultimate Aircraft 10 Dash is a Canadian single-seat sport and aerobatic biplane designed and built by Ultimate Aircraft Corporation of Guelph, Ontario.

== Design and development ==
The 10 Dash Model 100 was designed as sport biplane that could be either bought assembled or for amateur construction from either plans or a kit. The first prototype 10 Dash 100 first flew on 6 October 1985. It is designed to have either a 100 hp (75 kW) or 180 hp (134 kW) engine fitted for example a 100 hp (75 kW) Continental O-200 engine. It is a braced biplane with wooden wings, a welded steel tube fuselage, fixed conventional landing gear with a tailwheel and a single open cockpit. An aerobatic variant, the 10 Dash 200, is powered by a 180-200 hp engine. A competition aerobatic variant, the 10 Dash 300 can be fitted with either a 300 hp (224 kW) or 350 hp (261 kW) Lycoming engine with a three-bladed propeller. The 10 Dash 300 has a longer fuselage and longer-span wings with full-span symmetrical ailerons. A tandem two-seat variant, the 20 Dash 300, also joined the family.

== Variants ==
10 Dash 100
Basic single-seat sport variant.
10 Dash 200
Single-seat aerobatic variant.
10 Dash 300
Higher-power single-seat competition variant.
20 Dash 300
Tandem two-seat variant with a single-piece bubble canopy.

== Specifications (10 Dash 300) ==
Data from Jane's All the World's Aircraft 1989-90

General characteristics

- Crew: one
- Length: 21 ft 0 in (6.40 m)
- Wingspan: 19 ft 6 in (5.95 m)
- Wing area: 120 sq ft (11.15 m^{2})
- Empty weight: 1,150 lb (522 kg)
- Gross weight: 1,650 lb (748 kg)
- Powerplant: 1 × Lycoming engine , 300 or 350 hp (224 or 261 kW)

Performance

- Maximum speed: 250 mph (402 km/h, 220 kn)
- Cruise speed: 190 mph (305 km/h, 170 kn)
- Range: 900 mi (1,448 km, 780 nmi)
- g limits: +7/-5
- Roll rate: 360°/sec
- Rate of climb: 3,000 ft/min (15.2 m/s)

== See also ==
Aircraft of comparable role, configuration, and era

- Pitts Special
