= ULBI Wild Thing =

German Ultralight aircraft

Wild Thing
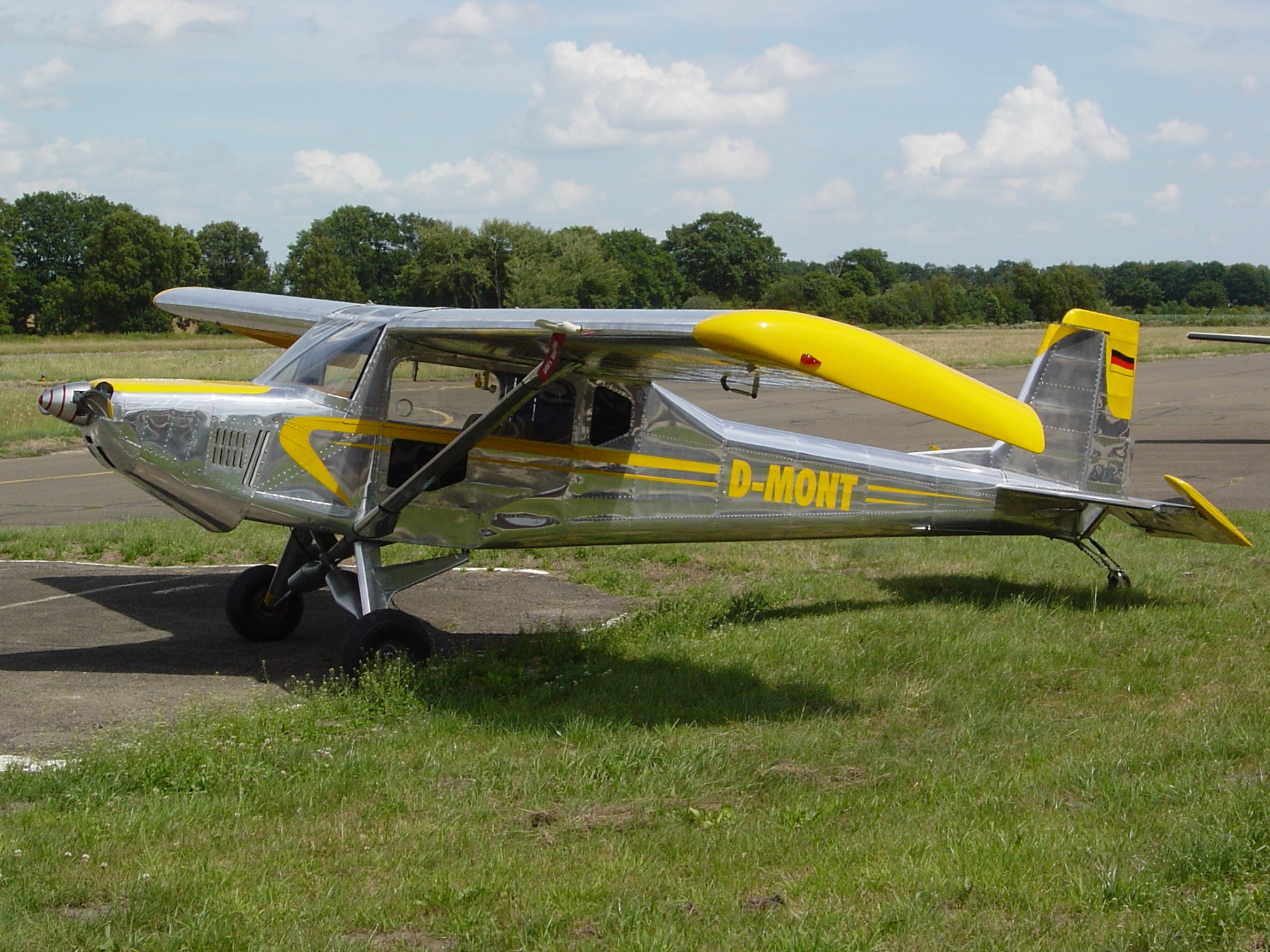
- WT 01 Wild Thing

General information
- Type: Ultralight aircraft
- National origin: Germany
- Manufacturer: Air-Max GmbH; ULBI
- Designer: R. Kurtz
- Status: Production completed (2014)
- Number built: 75 (1998)

History
- Introduction date: 1996

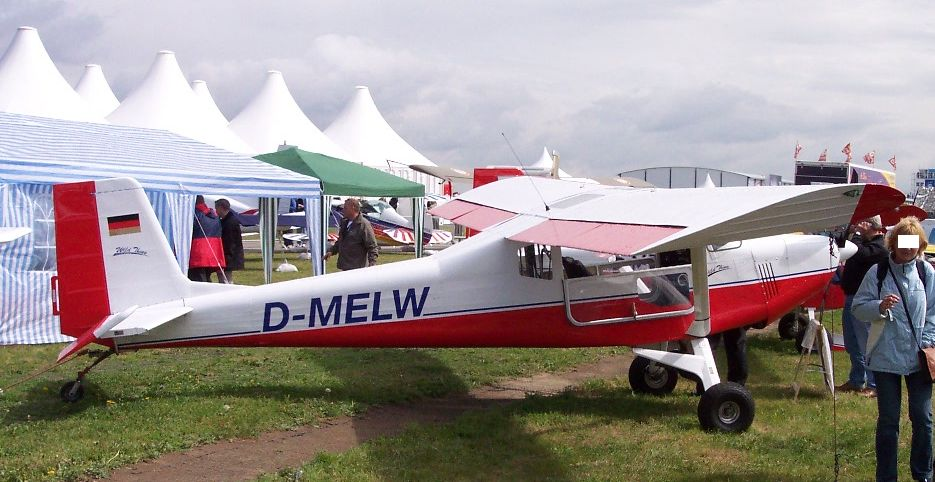
WT 01 Wild Thing

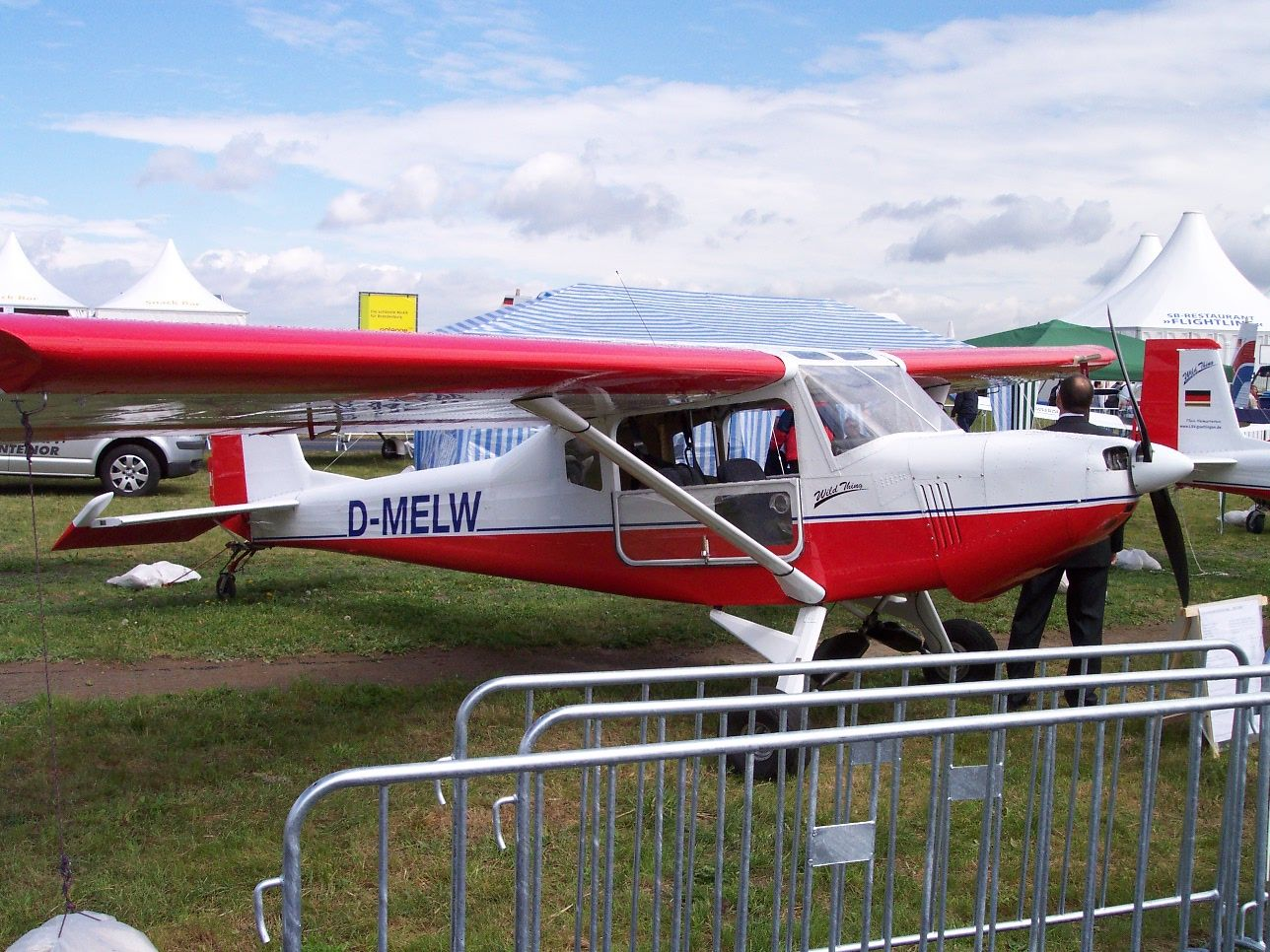
WT 01 Wild Thing

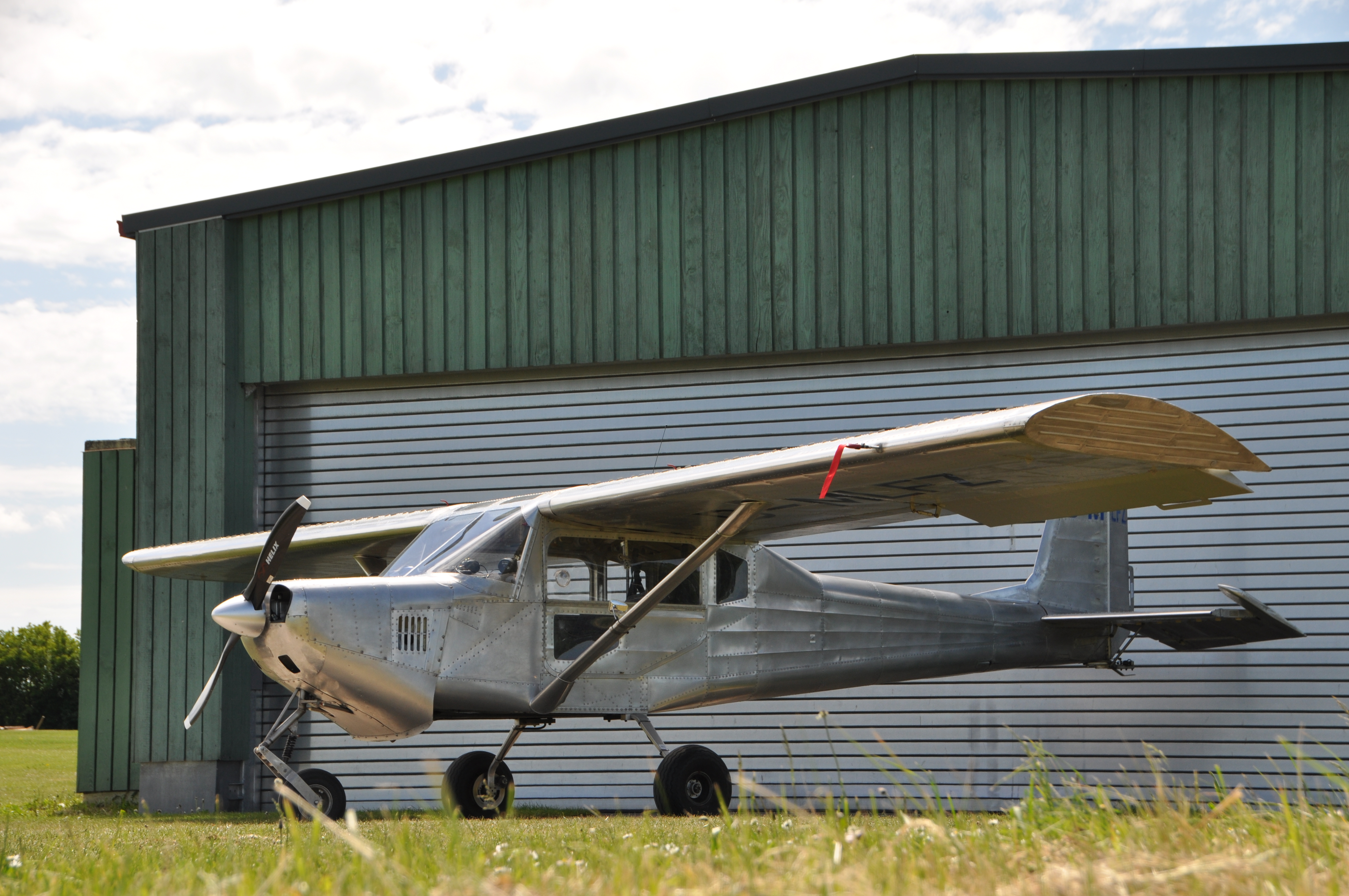
Wild Thing WT-02 Jabiru 3300

The ULBI Wild Thing is a German ultralight aircraft, designed by R. Kurtz and produced by Ultraleicht Bau International (ULBI), of Hassfurt. The aircraft was supplied as a kit for amateur construction or as a complete ready-to-fly-aircraft.

In the 1990s the aircraft was marketed by Air-Max GmbH of Nuremberg, Germany.

The aircraft was introduced in 1996 and production ended when ULBI went out of business in 2014.

== Design and development ==
The aircraft was designed specifically for touring in Africa. It was intended to comply with the Fédération Aéronautique Internationale microlight rules. It features a strut-braced high wing, a two-seats-in-side-by-side configuration enclosed cockpit with doors for access, fixed tricycle landing gear or conventional landing gear and a single engine in tractor configuration.

The aircraft is made from sheet aluminum. Its 9.15 m (30.0 ft) span wing has an area of 13.88 m^{2} (149.4 sq ft) and flaps. Standard engines available are the 100 hp (75 kW) Rotax 912ULS, 85 hp (63 kW) Jabiru 2200 and the 120 hp (89 kW) Jabiru 3300 four-stroke powerplants. The 100 hp (75 kW) Hirth F-30, 75 to 80 hp (56 to 60 kW) Limbach L2000 and the 180 hp (134 kW) Lycoming O-360 have also been fitted.

== Variants ==
WT 01
Conventional landing gear-equipped model
WT 02
Tricycle landing gear-equipped model

== Specifications (WT 02) ==
Data from Bayerl and Tacke

General characteristics

- Crew: one
- Capacity: one passenger
- Length: 6.49 m (21 ft 4 in)
- Wingspan: 9.15 m (30 ft 0 in)
- Wing area: 13.88 m^{2} (149.4 sq ft)
- Empty weight: 290 kg (639 lb)
- Gross weight: 472.5 kg (1,042 lb)
- Fuel capacity: 80 litres (18 imp gal; 21 US gal) in two 40 litres (8.8 imp gal; 11 US gal) wing tanks
- Powerplant: 1 × Jabiru 3300 six cylinder, air-cooled, four stroke aircraft engine, 89 kW (120 hp)

Performance

- Cruise speed: 170 km/h (110 mph, 92 kn)
- Stall speed: 58 km/h (36 mph, 31 kn)
- Never exceed speed: 200 km/h (120 mph, 110 kn)
- Rate of climb: 6 m/s (1,200 ft/min)
- Wing loading: 34.0 kg/m^{2} (7.0 lb/sq ft)

== See also ==
Similar aircraft

- Murphy Rebel
