= Walter Uetz Flugzeugbau =

Swiss aircraft manufacturer and designer

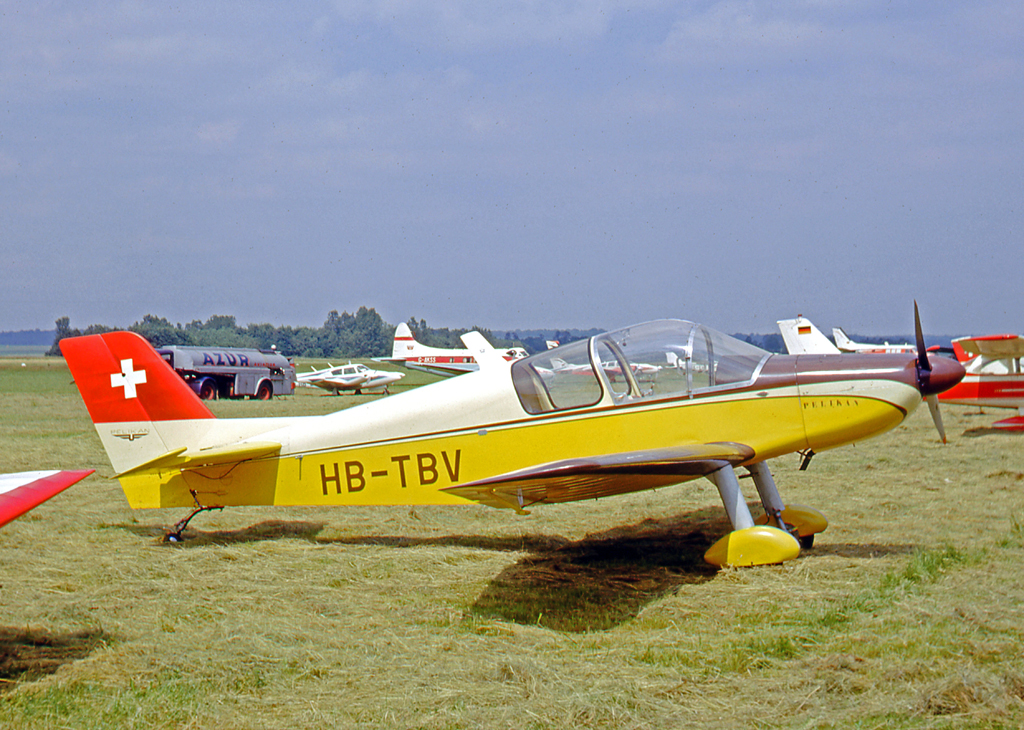
Uetz U3M Pelican

The Walter Uetz Flugzeugbau was a Swiss aircraft manufacturer and design company. From the 1950s it built the CAB Minicab and Jodel D.11 which it sold in Switzerland and Austria. It later produced the U2V, a modified Jodel D.119 with a straight wing.

First flown in 1963, Uetz designed and built the U3M Pelikan based on the U2V, but it was a four-seater with a Lycoming O-290 engine. The U3M was further developed as the U4M which had a Lycoming O-320 engine and flaps. The company ceased operating as an aircraft manufacturer in 1965; it had built 29 aircraft.

== Aircraft ==
- CAB Minicab, built from plans for local sale.
- Jodel D.11, built from plans for local sale.
- Uetz U2V, a modified Jodel D.119 with a new wing.
- Uetz U2-MFGZ, a modified Jodel D.119 with a Jodel-designed wing, one built.
- Uetz U3M Pelikan, two built
- Uetz U4M Pelikan. two built plus an additional amateur-built aircraft.
