= UL-Jih =

UL-Jih sro
- Company type: Privately held company
- Industry: Aerospace
- Founded: 1990
- Founder: Jaroslav Sedláček
- Headquarters: Kaplice, Czech Republic
- Products: Kit aircraft
- Owner: Jaroslav Sedláček
- Website: www.uljih.cz/homeeng.php

UL-Jih sro, also known as UL-Jih Sedláček Spol s.r.o. and Sedláček UL-JIH, is a Czech aircraft manufacturer based in Kaplice, founded by Jaroslav Sedláček in 1990. The company specializes in the design and manufacture of ultralight aircraft in the form of ready-to-fly aircraft in the European Fédération Aéronautique Internationale microlight category.

The company is a Společnost s ručením omezeným, a Czech private limited company.

While UL-Jih designs and builds aircraft, they are marketed by an affiliated company Fascination A.S., which is headed by Dušan Novotný and located in Brno, Czech Republic. UL-Jih head Jaroslav Sedláček is listed as head of production for Fascination A.S.

== History ==
Founded by Jaroslav Sedláček in 1990, UL-Jih was conceived as a design, manufacturing, flight training and repair facility, using both composite materials and traditional aircraft construction techniques. Initial business involved the repair of hang gliders and ultralight aircraft.

The first aircraft designed was the simple and inexpensive UL-Jih Kolibřík, designed with Josef Mareš, which sold 36 aircraft. This was followed by the UL-Jih Lišák and production of 41 of the Sunwheel biplanes designed by Wolfgang Dallach. Sedláček's UL-Jih Fascination, a family of two seat, low wing microlights, first flew in 1996 and has been under constant development ever since. The UL-Jih Evolution high-wing microlight first flew in 2002.

The company also offers flight training at its school at the Velešín airport.

== Aircraft ==
Summary of aircraft built by UL-Jih
Model name	First flight	Number built	Type
UL-Jih Kolibřík	1990	36	ultralight aircraft
UL-Jih Lišák	1990s		two-seat conventional landing gear ultralight aircraft
Dallach Sunwheel	1990s	41	two-seat biplane ultralight aircraft
UL-Jih Fascination	1996	200 (2006)	two-seat low-wing ultralight aircraft
UL-Jih Evolution	16 February 2002	6 (2005)	two-seat high-wing ultralight aircraft
