= US Aviation Cumulus =

American motorglider

Cumulus

General information
- Type: Motor glider
- National origin: United States
- Manufacturer: US Aviation
- Designer: Dave Ekstrom
- Status: Production completed
- Number built: 5 (December 2011)

History
- Introduction date: 1995
- First flight: 1995
- Developed from: US Aviation Cloud Dancer

The US Aviation Cumulus is an American low-wing, single-seat, open cockpit motor glider that was designed by Dave Ekstrom and produced by US Aviation, supplied in kit form for amateur construction.

== Design and development ==
The Cumulus was conceived as a lightweight motorglider for soaring and also for touring. It is a replacement of the earlier US Aviation Cloud Dancer design. The Cumulus first flew in 1995 and was named after the cumulus cloud.

Developer Dan Johnson initially outsourced aircraft engineering and production to AeroDreams, where the original kit designer / producer was Walter J. "Jim" Collie, with an assistant designing the fiberglass cabin. Initially, about eight kits were delivered, but production was halted for about four years, following a fatal accident that killed Collie and destroyed the prototype. Eyewitenesses reported hearing a loud "pop" and seeing the left wing departing the plane in flight. An NTSB investigation concluded that the probable cause was "debonding of the leading edge to spar cap joint, which resulted in inflight separation."

Johnson later conceded that "the project needed someone who understood building techniques better than I did. That man was Dave Ekstrom and he ultimately took over my design."

After 2004, the Cumulus was developed and produced for US Aviation, by Dave Ekstrom, president of Ultralight Soaring Aviation, in Bemidji, Minnesota, as the New Cumulus. According to Ekstrom, "When we completed this task, US Aviation sold us all design rights to the remainder of the aircraft as well as other assets," and Ultralight Soaring also "obtained the inventory created by AeroDreams."

Built from steel tubing (fuselage cage originally reinforced with 4130 chromoly tubing) surrounding a partially-enclosed pod, at the end of a 5-inch-diameter, seamless 6061-T6 aluminum main fuselage/tailboom tube, composites and fabric, the Cumulus is powered by a standard Rotax 447 40 hp (30 kW) engine in pusher configuration, although engines from 20 to 55 hp (15 to 41 kW) can be fitted. The dope-and-fabric-covered cantilever low wings are detachable for transport or storage. It has a glide ratio of 20:1. The landing gear is conventional and the cruciform tail is strut-braced. The aircraft was originally designed to allow removal of one wing without the other dropping, to facilitate single-person disassembly.

Construction time from the kit is estimated at 200 hours.

== Specifications (Cumulus) ==
Data from Purdy and KitPlanes

General characteristics

- Length: 20 ft 0 in (6.10 m)
- Wingspan: 43 ft 0 in (13.11 m)
- Height: 4 ft 6 in (1.37 m)
- Wing area: 141 sq ft (13.1 m^{2})
- Aspect ratio: 13:1
- Empty weight: 320 lb (145 kg)
- Gross weight: 560 lb (254 kg)
- Fuel capacity: 5 U.S. gallons (19 L; 4.2 imp gal)
- Powerplant: 1 × Rotax 447 twin cylinder, two-stroke aircraft engine, 40 hp (30 kW)

Performance

- Maximum speed: 85 mph (137 km/h, 74 kn)
- Cruise speed: 75 mph (121 km/h, 65 kn)
- Stall speed: 32 mph (51 km/h, 28 kn) in landing configuration
- Never exceed speed: 89 mph (144 km/h, 78 kn)
- Range: 275 mi (443 km, 239 nmi)
- Service ceiling: 15,000 ft (4,600 m)
- Maximum glide ratio: 20:1 at 34 mph (55 km/h)
- Rate of climb: 800 ft/min (4.1 m/s)
- Rate of sink: 195 ft/min (0.99 m/s) at 43 mph (69 km/h)

== See also ==
- List of gliders

Aircraft of comparable role, configuration, and era

- EEL ULF 2
