= US Aviation CAVU =

American ultralight aircraft

CAVU

General information
- Type: Ultralight aircraft
- National origin: United States
- Manufacturer: AeroDreams
- Status: Production completed
- Number built: 1 (1998)

History
- First flight: 1997

The US Aviation CAVU (named for the aeronautical meteorology term meaning "Ceiling And Visibility Unlimited") is an American high-wing, strut-braced, single-seat, open cockpit, single engine in pusher configuration, ultralight aircraft that was designed and produced by AeroDreams of Manchester, Tennessee, but marketed by US Aviation of St Paul, Minnesota under their brand name. The aircraft was supplied as a kit for amateur construction.

== Design and development ==
The aircraft was designed to comply with the US FAR 103 Ultralight Vehicles rules, including the category's maximum empty weight of 254 lb (115 kg). The CAVU has an empty weight of 220 lb (100 kg). The design goals for the CAVU were a simple and inexpensive aircraft, achieving good performance with a small and inexpensive engine.

The aircraft is made from aluminium tubing, wood and fabric. The fuselage is built on an aluminium tube, which supports the tail as well as the pilot's seat. Its 31 ft (9.4 m) span wing is braced by a single lift strut. Powered by a Zenoah G-25 engine of 22 hp (16 kW), the CAVU cruises at 52 mph (84 km/h). Acceptable engines can range in power from 22 to 30 hp (16 to 22 kW). The fuel capacity is 3 U.S. gallons (11 L; 2.5 imp gal), with 5 U.S. gallons (19 L; 4.2 imp gal) optional. The landing gear is tricycle gear.

Estimated assembly time from the kit is 100 hours.

== Specifications (CAVU) ==
Data from Purdy and KitPlanes

General characteristics

- Crew: one
- Length: 17 ft 3 in (5.26 m)
- Wing area: 151 sq ft (14.0 m^{2})
- Empty weight: 220 lb (100 kg)
- Gross weight: 520 lb (236 kg)
- Fuel capacity: 3 U.S. gallons (11 L; 2.5 imp gal)
- Powerplant: 1 × Zenoah G-25 , 22 hp (16 kW)
- Propellers: 2-bladed wooden

Performance

- Maximum speed: 90 mph (140 km/h, 78 kn)
- Cruise speed: 52 mph (84 km/h, 45 kn)
- Stall speed: 27 mph (43 km/h, 23 kn)
- Range: 180 mi (290 km, 160 nmi)
- Rate of climb: 500 ft/min (2.5 m/s)

== See also ==
Aircraft of comparable role, configuration, and era

- Quad City Challenger
- US Light Aircraft Hornet
