= UL-Jih Fascination =

Fascination
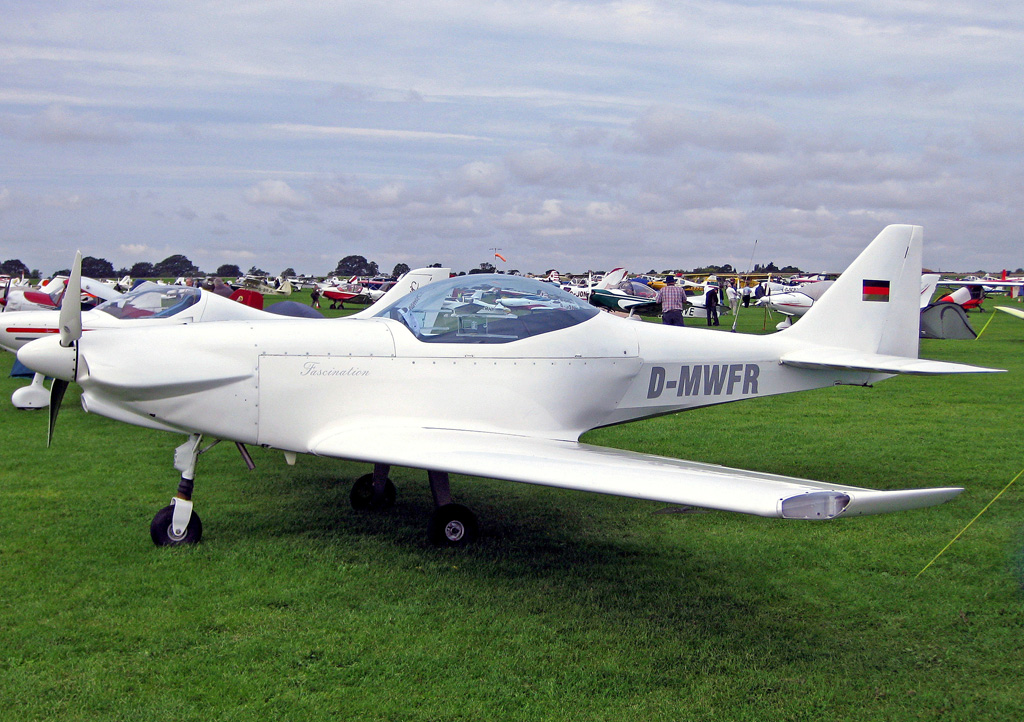
- Dallach D.4 Fascination attending the 2012 LAA Rally at Sywell Aerodrome

General information
- Type: Two seat ultralight/kitbuilt
- National origin: Czech Republic
- Manufacturer: UL-Jih Sedláĉek Spol s.r.o.
- Designer: Jaroslav Sedláĉek
- Number built: more than 200 by mid-2006

History
- First flight: early 1996

The UL-Jih Fascination, also called the Fascination F100, is a conventionally laid out, two seat, low wing, single engine ultralight, designed and built in the Czech Republic. Two variants were offered in 2010.

== Design and development ==
The Fascination F100 is an advanced version of the ultralight/VLA airplane which was based on the all composite VLA layout of the Fascination (D4BK) by Wolfgang Dallach. During and after his collaboration with Wolfgang Dallach, Jaroslav Sedláĉek from UL-Jih in the Czech Republic made own contributions to the design which finally led to today's UL-Jih F-100.

The Fascination was marketed by WD Flugzeugleichtbau of Germany as the Dallach D.4 Fascination. This was an aircraft of mixed construction, including wood, composites and steel components with fabric covering. It first flew in 1996. An all-composites version, the Dallach D.4 BK Fascination was flown in 1999. UL-Jih fabricated these models and claimed sole production and marketing rights both to the D.4 and D.5 when WD Flugzeugliechtbau ceased trading in 2005, though those rights are challenged by Swiss Light Aircraft AG, who build their versions.

Current Fascinations are all-composite aircraft, with a low wing of trapezoidal planform. The ailerons have external balance trim tabs and sealed nosegaps. Inboard, there are electrically operated Fowler flaps. The fuselage becomes slender towards the tail, where the trapezoidal tailplane is set at mid-height, the elevators having a small cutout for rudder movement. The fin is swept but the rudder has vertical edges; it extends to the bottom of the fuselage. The cockpit seats two in side-by-side configuration under a one-piece bubble canopy, lever hinged from the rear; behind the seat backs there is luggage space. Until 2008, all Fascinations had a retractable tricycle undercarriage. The main wheels, mounted from the fuselage on cantilever spring legs, retract electrically outward into the wing and the nosewheel retracts rearwards. The fixed wheel option has wheel fairings. The main wheels have brakes and the nosewheel has power steering. A Stratos Magnum 501 ballistic recovery parachute is fitted.

The Fascination may be powered either by a 73.5 kW (98.6 hp) Rotax 912ULS or a 59.6 kW (79.9 hp) Rotax 912UL.

== Operational history ==
The Fascination has been marketed both complete and in kit form. More than 200 had been sold by 2006 and 183 appeared on the mid-2010 civil registers of European countries, excluding Russia.

It was reported that Fascination-airplanes (various versions) were flying in countries as remote as Brazil, Australia, and the Philippines.

== Accidents and fatalities ==
The Website Aviation Safety Network shows 28 incidents of the type involving 24 fatalities since 1997.

== Variants ==
DN4
Original mixed construction Fascination; flew 1996; 41 built.
DN4 BK
Composite construction.
F80
Rotax 912UL engine.
F100
Rotax 912ULS engine.

== Specifications (F80) ==
Data from Jane's All the World's Aircraft 2011/12

General characteristics

- Capacity: two
- Length: 6.87 m (22 ft 6 in)
- Wingspan: 9.00 m (29 ft 6 in)
- Height: 2.10 m (6 ft 11 in)
- Wing area: 10.70 m^{2} (115.2 sq ft) gross
- Empty weight: 297 kg (655 lb)
- Max takeoff weight: 472.5 kg (1,042 lb)
- Fuel capacity: 96 L (25.3 US gal; 21.1 Imp gal)
- Powerplant: 1 × Rotax 912UL Four cylinder four stroke, air- and water-cooled, 59.6 kW (79.9 hp)

Performance

- Cruise speed: 243 km/h (151 mph, 131 kn)
- Stall speed: 65 km/h (40 mph, 35 kn) flaps extended
- Never exceed speed: 270 km/h (170 mph, 150 kn)
- Range: 1,400 km (870 mi, 760 nmi) with maximum fuel
- g limits: +4.0/-2.0
- Rate of climb: 6.0 m/s (1,180 ft/min) maximum at sea level

Avionics

- GPS and transponder options
