= Volmer VJ-24W SunFun =

American ultralight aircraft

VJ-24W SunFun
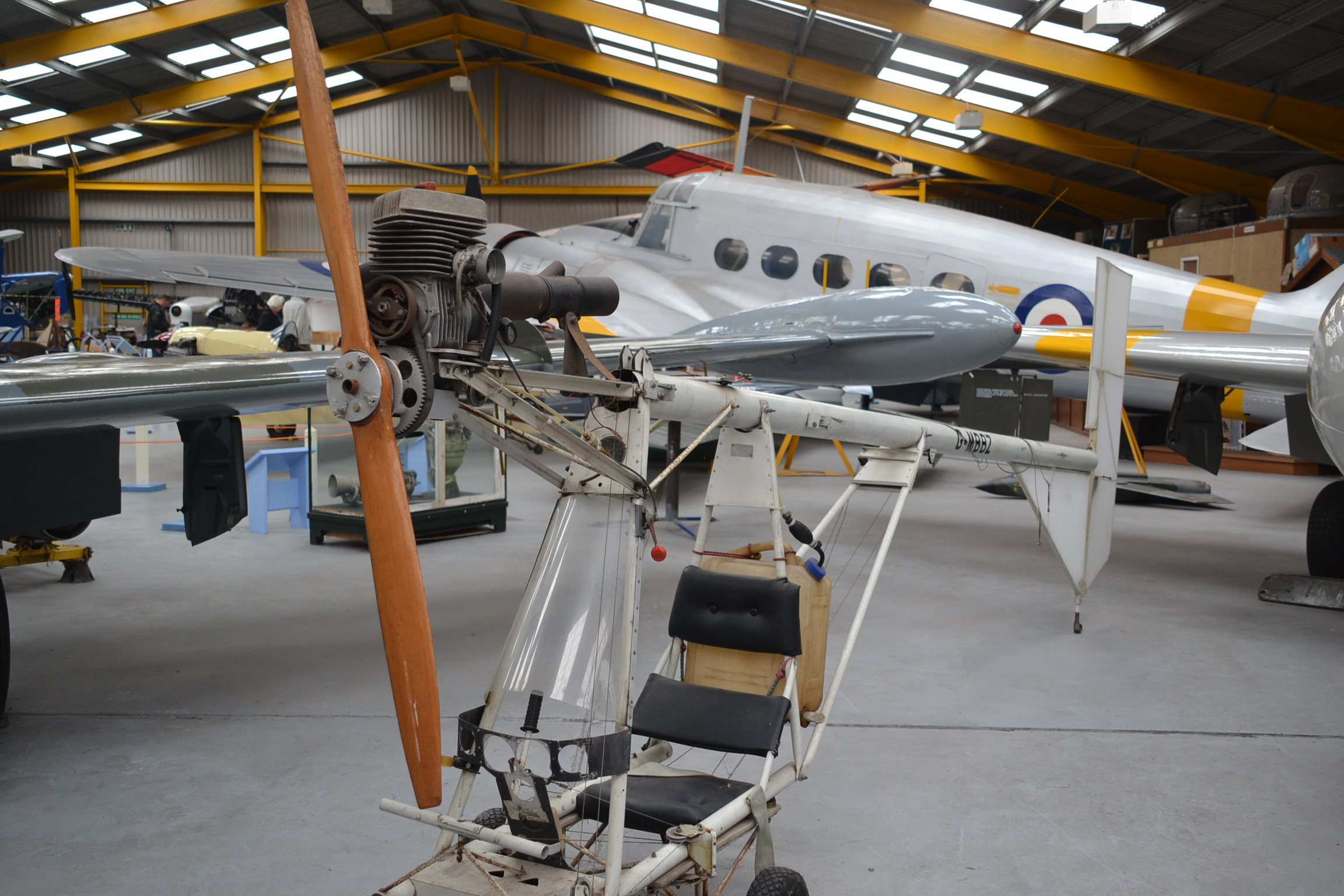

General information
- Type: Motor glider/Ultralight aircraft
- National origin: United States
- Manufacturer: Volmer Aircraft
- Designer: Volmer Jensen

History
- Introduction date: 1977
- Developed from: Volmer VJ-23 Swingwing
- Variant: Delta Sailplane Nomad

The Volmer VJ-24W SunFun is an American high-wing, strut-braced, single-seat, pod-and-boom motor glider and ultralight aircraft that was designed by Volmer Jensen and provided as plans for amateur construction by his company Volmer Aircraft of Glendale, California.

== Design and development ==
The SunFun started as a foot-launched glider design, the VJ-24, and was developed into a wheeled undercarriage motor glider, the VJ-24W. The VJ-24 was derived from the earlier Volmer VJ-23 Swingwing and differed from that design by replacing the wooden structure with metal and employing a constant chord, strut-braced wing in place of the VJ-23's cantilever, tapered wing.

The aircraft is built from aluminium tubing covered with aircraft fabric. The 36.5 ft (11.1 m) span wing is braced by V-struts, supported by triangular jury struts. The fuselage is built around a keel tube that mounts the cruciform tail at the aft end, the wing and cockpit in the center and the engine at the front. The specified engines are the Yamaha KT100 15 hp (11 kW) go-kart powerplant and the 10 hp (7 kW) McCulloch MAC-101, mounted in tractor configuration on the front of the keel tube, above the aircraft's nose. The landing gear is of conventional configuration, using spoked bicycle wheels for the main gear. Pilot weight is limited to 200 lb (91 kg).

The take-off and landing distances with the 15 hp (11 kW) engine are both 100 ft (30 m).

In 1998 plans cost US$100 and the estimated cost of the materials to build the VJ-24W were US$2400. The estimated construction time is 250 hours.

== Variants ==
VJ-24
Unpowered three axis-controlled hang glider version, foot launched and landed. Glide ratio is 9:1 at 20 mph (32 km/h) and minimum sink is 180 fpm.
VJ-24W
Powered version with wheeled landing gear.

== Specifications (VJ-24W) ==
Data from Purdy, Vintage Ultralight Museum and Soaring

General characteristics

- Crew: one
- Length: 18 ft 6 in (5.64 m)
- Wingspan: 36 ft 6 in (11.13 m)
- Height: 5 ft 7 in (1.70 m)
- Wing area: 163 sq ft (15.1 m^{2})
- Empty weight: 165 lb (75 kg)
- Gross weight: 345 lb (156 kg)
- Fuel capacity: 1 US gallon (3.8 L; 0.83 imp gal)
- Propellers: 2-bladed wooden fixed pitch

Performance

- Maximum speed: 42 mph (68 km/h, 36 kn)
- Cruise speed: 28 mph (45 km/h, 24 kn)
- Stall speed: 15 mph (24 km/h, 13 kn)
- Range: 30 mi (48 km, 26 nmi)
- Maximum glide ratio: 9:1
- Rate of climb: 350 ft/min (1.8 m/s)
- Rate of sink: 180 ft/min (0.91 m/s)

== See also ==
- List of gliders
