= US Aviation Cloud Dancer =

American ultralight motorglider

Cloud Dancer
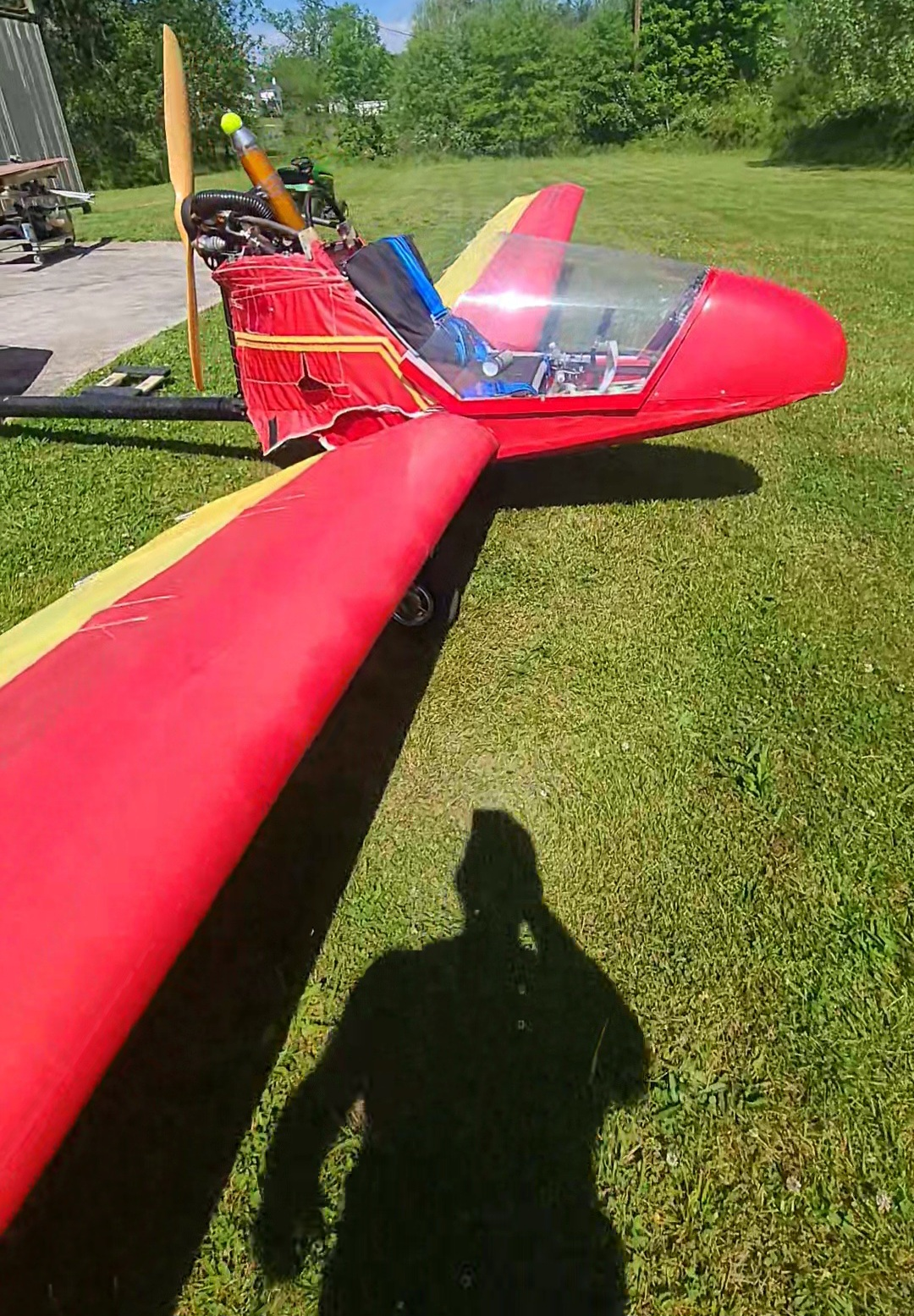

General information
- Type: Ultralight motorglider
- National origin: United States
- Manufacturer: US Aviation
- Designer: Erwin Rodger and Roger Delura
- Status: Production completed

History
- Manufactured: 1991-1994
- Introduction date: 1983
- Variant: US Aviation Cumulus

The US Aviation Cloud Dancer is an American ultralight motorglider that was designed by Erwin Rodger and Roger Delura and produced by US Aviation. The aircraft was supplied as a kit for amateur construction.

== Design and development ==
The Cloud Dancer was designed to be a motorglider that would also comply with the US FAR 103 Ultralight Vehicles rules, including the category's maximum empty weight of 254 lb (115 kg). The aircraft has a standard empty weight of 252 lb (114 kg). It features a cantilever mid-wing, a single-seat, open cockpit, conventional landing gear, a V-tail and a single engine in pusher configuration.

The aircraft is made from aluminum and fiberglass. Its 40 ft (12.2 m) span wing with a 12:1 aspect ratio is built around an aluminum D-cell leading edge, with the aft part of the wing fabric is supported by removable fiberglass battens. The wing fabric provides an 80% double surface airfoil. The controls are three-axis, using spoilerons for roll control. Air brakes are also fitted. The landing gear features fiberglass suspension and the tailwheel is steerable. The wings are quickly removable and the whole aircraft was designed to be transported on the roof of a 1980s-era station wagon, taking 20 minutes to assemble or disassemble. The standard engine supplied was the 28 hp (21 kW) Rotax 277 single cylinder, two-stroke aircraft engine.

Production ended in 1994 and the conventional-tailed, but otherwise similar US Aviation Cumulus commenced production in 1995.

== Specifications (Cloud Dancer) ==
Data from Cliche and VULM

General characteristics

- Crew: one
- Length: 17 ft (5.2 m)
- Wingspan: 40 ft 0 in (12.19 m)
- Height: 4 ft 6 in (1.37 m)
- Wing area: 132 sq ft (12.3 m^{2})
- Aspect ratio: 12:1
- Empty weight: 252 lb (114 kg)
- Gross weight: 520 lb (236 kg)
- Fuel capacity: 5 U.S. gallons (19 L; 4.2 imp gal)
- Powerplant: 1 × Rotax 277 single cylinder, two-stroke aircraft engine, 28 hp (21 kW)

Performance

- Cruise speed: 50 mph (80 km/h, 43 kn)
- Stall speed: 27 mph (43 km/h, 23 kn)
- Range: 250 mi (400 km, 220 nmi)
- g limits: +4.2/-2
- Maximum glide ratio: 15:1
- Rate of climb: 600 ft/min (3.0 m/s)
