= US Aviation =

American aircraft manufacturer

- Company type: Limited liability company
- Industry: Aerospace
- Founded: 1970s
- Defunct: circa 2008
- Fate: Ceased operations
- Headquarters: St Paul, Minnesota, United States
- Key people: Klaus Hill; Larry Hall
- Products: Gliders, motor gliders, ultralight aircraft

US Aviation (Full name: Ultralight Soaring Aviation LLC) was an American aircraft manufacturer, started by Klaus Hill and Larry Hall in the 1970s initially to build their Super Floater ultralight glider design. The company later marketed the Cumulus ultralight motor glider and the CAVU ultralight.

After becoming dormant in the 1980s the company was resurrected in 1995 to market a redesigned Super Floater that was produced by the Wind Walker Aircraft Co of Salt Lake City, Utah and the Cumulus motorglider, which first flew the same year and was manufactured by AeroDreams.

Reported as still in business in December 2007, the company no longer existed in 2011.

== Aircraft ==
Aircraft built by US Aviation
Model name	First flight	Number built	Type
US Aviation Super Floater	1970s		Ultralight glider
US Aviation Cloud Dancer	1983		Ultralight motorglider
US Aviation Cumulus	1995		Ultralight motorglider
US Aviation CAVU	1997		Ultralight aircraft
