= Albatros G.I =

G.I
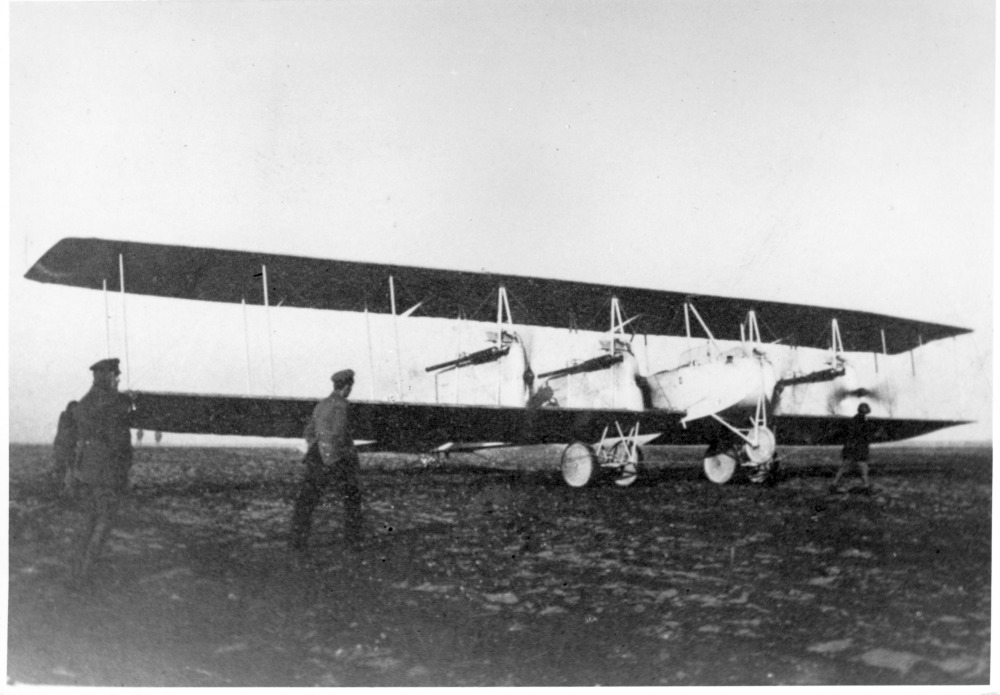

General information
- Type: Heavy bomber
- Manufacturer: Ostdeutsche Albatroswerke G.m.b.H (OAW)
- Designer: Hugo Grohmann
- Primary user: Germany
- Number built: 1

History
- First flight: 31 January 1916

The Albatros G.I (post-war company designation L.4) was a four-engined German biplane bomber of World War I.

== Development ==
Founded on 27 April 1914 the Ostdeutsche Albatroswerke G.m.b.H. at Schneidemühl by Otto Wiener and Dr. Walter Huth, the OAW maintained close ties with Albatros, remaining an independent company until October 1917. The majority of OAWs work involved licence manufacture of products from the parent Albatros company.

Given the company designation L4, one of the few homegrown designs was the Albatros G.I a four-engined heavy bomber inspired by the Sikorsky Ilya Muromets. The G.I was of typical construction for 1915, with wooden structure, wire-braced and covered with fabric and four engines mounted in nacelles on the lower wing upper surface.

First flown on 31 January 1916 by Alexander Hipleh, flight trials revealed not only poor flying qualities, but also poor performance, which resulted in further development being abandoned. The later G.II and G.III were not directly related to the G.I, being twin-engined, a lot lighter and having completely different wing designs.

== Specifications (G.I) ==
Data from The German Giants

General characteristics

- Crew: 5+
- Length: 12 m (39 ft 4 in)
- Wingspan: 27.3 m (89 ft 7 in)
- Wing area: 138 m^{2} (1,490 sq ft)
- Powerplant: 4 × Mercedes D.II 6 cyl. water-cooled in-line piston engine, 89.5 kW (120.0 hp) each

== See also ==
Aircraft of comparable role, configuration, and era

- Sikorsky Ilya Muromets
- Siemens Forsmann

== Bibliography ==
- Herris, Jack (2017). Albatros Aircraft of WWI: A Centennial Perspective on Great War Airplanes: Volume 3: Bombers, Seaplanes, J-Types. Great War Aviation Centennial Series. Vol. 26. Charleston, South Carolina: Aeronaut Books. ISBN 978-1-935881-49-0.
