= Walbro =

Manufacturing company

Walbro Corporation is a manufacturing company that specializes in small engine carburetion and supplier of auto parts. Otherwise, Walbro carburetors are commonly used on line-trimmers, leaf blowers, chain-saws, and edgers. Walbro was founded by Walter E. Walpole in November 1950. A product typically found in the automotive world of fuel injection, being used by tuners, are the Walbro Fuel Pumps, with the most common being the Walbro 255. TI Automotive purchased Walbro's automotive fuel pump division in approx yr2000, and is the actual manufacturer of all Walbro branded automotive fuel pumps and fuel delivery modules.
