= Ultra-Leicht Flugtechnik Speedy Mouse =

German ultralight aircraft

Speedy Mouse

General information
- Type: Ultralight aircraft
- National origin: Germany
- Manufacturer: Ultra-Leicht Flugtechnik
- Status: In production (2012)

History
- Developed from: FMP Qualt 200

The Ultra-Leicht Flugtechnik Speedy Mouse is a German ultralight aircraft, designed and produced by Ultra-Leicht Flugtechnik of Braunschweig. The aircraft is supplied as a complete ready-to-fly-aircraft.

== Design and development ==
The aircraft was derived from the FMP Qualt 200 and designed to comply with the Fédération Aéronautique Internationale microlight rules. It features a cantilever low-wing, a T-tail, a two-seats-in-side-by-side configuration enclosed cockpit under a front-hinged bubble canopy, fixed conventional landing gear and a single engine in tractor configuration.

The Speedy Mouse is made from mixed wood and epoxy construction. Its 9.2 m (30.2 ft) span wing employs a GA-W 1 airfoil and has an area of 10.5 m^{2} (113 sq ft). The wings can be quickly removed for ground transport or storage. The standard engine is the 100 hp (75 kW) Rotax 912ULS four-stroke powerplant. The aircraft was designed for aero-towing gliders.

== Specifications (Speedy Mouse) ==
Data from Bayerl and Ultra-Leicht Flugtechnik

General characteristics

- Crew: one
- Capacity: one passenger
- Length: 5.90 m (19 ft 4 in)
- Wingspan: 9.2 m (30 ft 2 in)
- Height: 1.70 m (5 ft 7 in)
- Wing area: 10.5 m^{2} (113 sq ft)
- Airfoil: GA-W 1
- Empty weight: 298 kg (657 lb)
- Gross weight: 450 kg (992 lb)
- Fuel capacity: 47 litres (10 imp gal; 12 US gal)
- Powerplant: 1 × Rotax 912ULS four cylinder, liquid and air-cooled, four stroke aircraft engine, 75 kW (101 hp)
- Propellers: 3-bladed composite

Performance

- Maximum speed: 230 km/h (140 mph, 120 kn)
- Cruise speed: 185 km/h (115 mph, 100 kn)
- Stall speed: 64 km/h (40 mph, 35 kn)
- Range: 650 km (400 mi, 350 nmi)
- Rate of climb: 7 m/s (1,400 ft/min)
- Wing loading: 42.9 kg/m^{2} (8.8 lb/sq ft)
