= Udet U 10 =

Two-seat sport aircraft built in Germany in the early 1920s

U 10
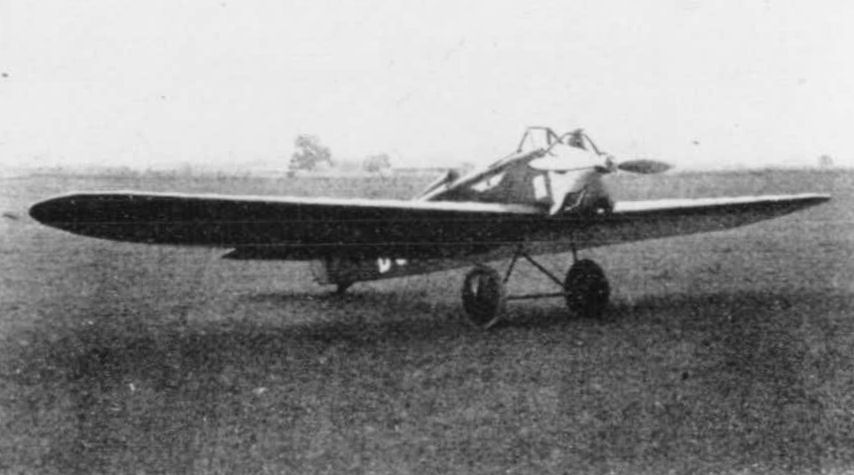

General information
- Type: Low power sport aircraft
- National origin: Germany
- Manufacturer: Udet Flugzeugbau
- Designer: Hans Henry Herrmann
- Number built: 9–10

History
- First flight: 1924
- Developed from: Udet U 1

The Udet U 10 was a small, low-power sport aircraft developed in Germany in the early 1920s as an improved version of the Udet U 1, via the U 2 and U 6.

== Design ==
The U 10 was a low-wing cantilever monoplane of conventional design. It was powered by a single, piston engine mounted in the nose, driving a two-blade tractor propeller. It had a conventional tail and conventional, tailskid undercarriage.

The fuselage and tail unit were of all-wood construction. The wings were wooden as well, covered in fabric.

Compared to the earlier Udet Flugzeugbau designs from which it was derived, the U 10 featured a larger wingspan, redesigned fuselage, and a rollbar to protect the pilot.

== Development ==
The first U 10 was completed in July 1924, with flight testing taking place over the following months. By October, four aircraft had been built. Nine U 10s appear on the German civil register, and a tenth registration (D 618) is known from an accident report, but does not appear on the register as a U 10.

A single example was built as a floatplane, designated U 10a. This was powered by a 75-kilowatt (101 hp) Siemens-Halske Sh 11 engine with nearly twice the power of the Sh 4 unit fitted to the landplane version. It also featured a taller tailfin and the rollbar was deleted. The floats were made from Aludur, and aviation historian Olaf Bichel speculates they might have been manufactured from the unfinished U 9 flying boat project. Testing took place at Lake Starnberg in March and April 1925, with Ernst Udet conducting some of the flights.

== Operational history ==
U 10s were flown competitively, and saw service with one flying school in Bavaria. In October 1924, Ernst Udet flew one in the 1924 Coppa d'Italia in Rome. The entry was disqualified in the preliminary rounds as Udet was unable to fly the aircraft slowly enough to meet the maximum stall speed required by the competition, 67.2 kilometres per hour (41.8 mph; 36.3 kn). The main event was six runs of a 50-kilometre (31 mi) triangular course. In this, Udet finished fastest, completing the course in 1 hour 33 minutes 30 seconds and a full 20 minutes ahead of the second-place competitor. However, this only placed him third in the competition overall.

In January 1925, Udet demonstrated a ski-equipped U 10 at the 1925 Ostmesse trade fair in Königsberg. He then flew a U 10 in the 1925 Zugspitz-Flug ("Zugspitze flight") competition from 31 January to 1 February. His was one of five U 10s out of a field of 13 competitors. Again, Udet finished fastest, but the prize was awarded to the aircraft with the lowest fuel consumption, which left him in second place. The other U 10s finished fourth, fifth, sixth, and eighth.

Four U 10s competed in the 1925 Deutschen Rundflug ("German round trip") from May 31 to June 19. U 10s won both the BZ-Preis der Lüfte ("BZ Prize of the Skies") and Otto-Lilienthal-Preis ("Otto Lilienthal Prize") events, flown by Carl Hochmuth each time. Four U 10s also took part in an international flight competition held at Flugplatz Schleißheim from 12–14 September. One of them, flown by Alexander von Bismarck, won first place in the Angelflug ("angel flight") competition.

The Oberbayerishchen Sportsflug flying school at Schleißheim used the type as a trainer. The school purchased two aircraft itself and another two were supplied by the Reichsverkehrsministerium. Following a fatal crash by a student pilot on 31 March 1926, the remaining three aircraft were judged unsuitable for their role.

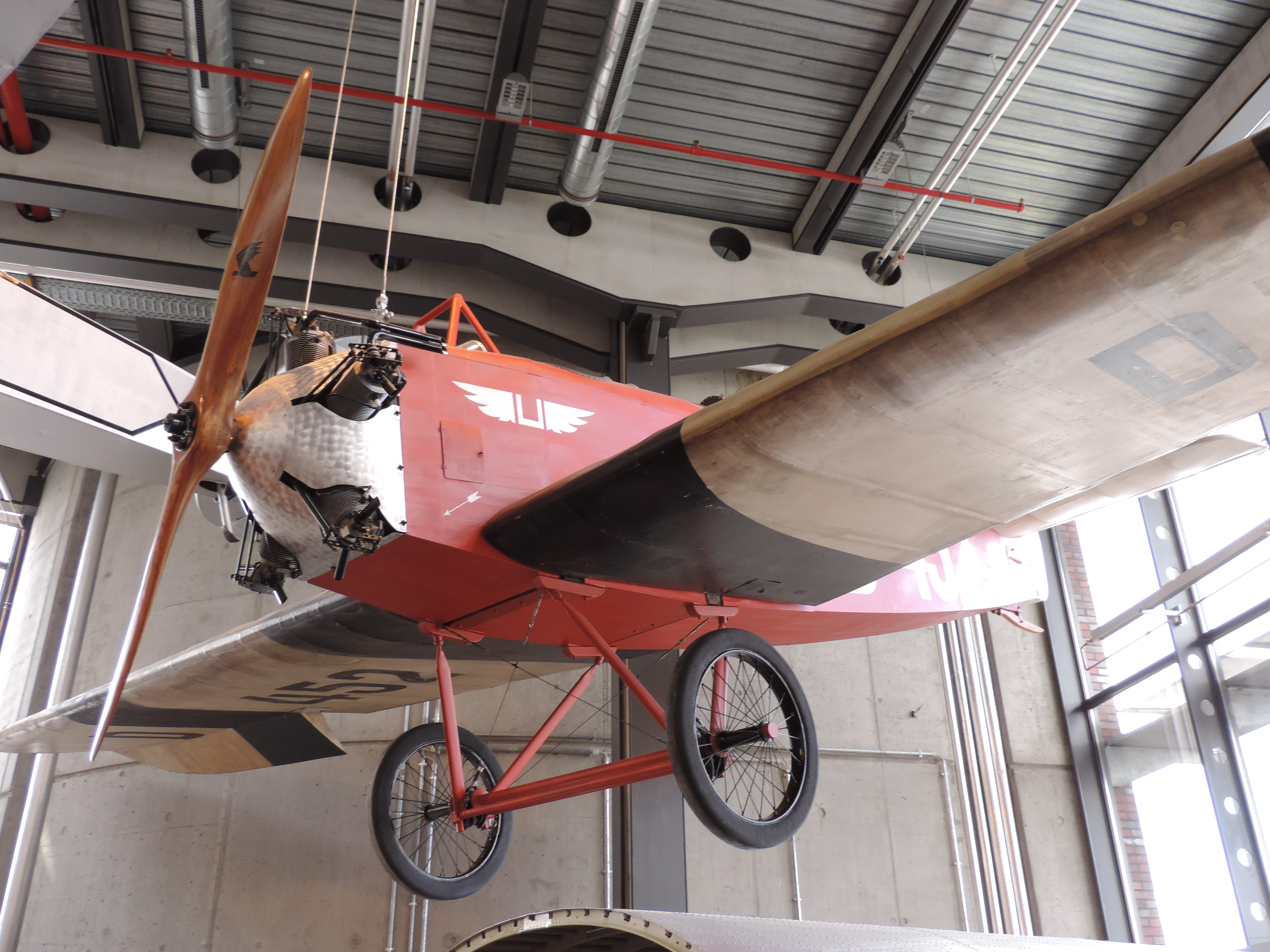
Reconstruction of a U 10 in the Deutsches Technikmuseum Berlin

An example of a U 10 is displayed at the Deutsches Technikmuseum Berlin. This exhibit is a hybrid of the genuine wings of U 10 D 452, combined with the engine of a U 6 recovered from Argentina, a suitable Schwarz propeller also recovered from Argentina, plus a new fuselage constructed completely with tools and materials as used to build the original aircraft.

== Variants ==
U 10
original version with Siemens-Halske Sh 4 engine; 8–9 built
U 10a
floatplane version with Siemens-Halske Sh 11 engine; 1 built

== Specifications ==
Data from Birchal 2013, p.72

General characteristics

- Crew: 1 pilot
- Capacity: 1 passenger
- Length: 5.90 m (19 ft 4 in)
- Wingspan: 10.6 m (34 ft 9 in)
- Height: 2.0 m (6 ft 7 in)
- Wing area: 14 m^{2} (150 sq ft)
- Empty weight: 320 kg (705 lb)
- Gross weight: 570 kg (1,257 lb)
- Powerplant: 1 × Siemens-Halske Sh 4 five-cylinder, radial, air-cooled piston engine, 41 kW (55 hp) (55 PS)

Performance

- Maximum speed: 155 km/h (96 mph, 84 kn)

== Notes ==
=== Bibliography ===
- Bichel, Olaf (2013). Die Flugzeuge der Udet Flugzeugbau GmbH [The aeroplanes of the Udet Flugzeugbau company] (in German). Oberschleißheim: Bayerische Flugzeug-Historiker eV.
- During, Rainer W. (April 2006). "Udet U 10 wird rekonstruiert" [Udet U 10 is being reconstructed]. Flugzeug Classic [Aeroplane Classic] (in German). Vol. 7, no. 4. München: GeraMond. pp. 20–23.
- The Illustrated Encyclopedia of Aircraft. Vol. 13. London: Aerospace Publishing. 1984.
- Taylor, Michael J. H. (1993). Jane's Encyclopedia of Aviation. London: Studio Editions.
