= L68 =

L68 may refer to:

- Albatros L 68, a 1920s German two-seat trainer aircraft
- Haplogroup I-L68 (Y-DNA), a subclade of haplogroup I2 (Y-DNA)
- HMS Eridge (L68), a 1940 Royal Navy Hunt class destroyer
- hypertrichosis ICD-10 code

ℓ 68 may refer to:

- Lectionary 68, a 12th-century Greek manuscript of the New Testament on vellum leaves
