= Udet U 2 =

German Two-seat sport aircraft

U 2

General information
- Type: Low power sport aircraft
- National origin: Germany
- Manufacturer: Udet Flugzeugbau
- Designer: Hans Henry Herrmann
- Number built: 7–8

History
- First flight: 1922 or 1923
- Developed from: Udet U 1

The Udet U 2 was a small, low-power sport aircraft developed in Germany in the early 1920s as an improved version of the Udet U 1. Unlike its single-seat predecessor, the U 2 was a two-seater. But like its predecessor, it was very underpowered. Out of seven or eight aircraft built, there is no record that a single one sold.

== Design ==
The U 2 was a low-wing cantilever monoplane of conventional design. It was powered by a single, piston engine mounted in the nose, driving a two-blade tractor propeller. It had a conventional tail and conventional, tailskid undercarriage. The pilot and a single passenger sat in tandem in an open cockpit.

The fuselage was of all-wood construction. The wings were wooden as well, covered in fabric. The tail unit was built from steel tube, and also fabric-covered.

== Development ==
The first U 2 was completed in December 1922, and by the following April, seven examples had been built, with an eighth under construction. These were issued civil registrations D-234 through D-241, although no record exists that any of them were ever sold. Historian Olaf Bichel notes that not a single photo is known of a U 2 with a registration applied to it. He also speculates that some of the airframes might have been used to create the U 3 and U 4 designs.

== Operational history ==
By the time that the U 2s were built, it was also apparent that the founding aim of the Udet Flugzeugbau company, selling low-price aircraft to the United States, was unrealistic. Therefore, an invitation for company founder Ernst Udet to compete in the Copa Wilbur Wright ("Wilbur Wright Cup") in Argentina was timely because it provided an opportunity to promote the company's products in a new market.

One U 2 and a U 3 were shipped to South America, arriving on 28 May 1923. They were transported to the Escuela de Aviación Militar at El Palomar for assembly. On 10 June, Udet demonstrated both aircraft at San Isidro in their first display flights. Five days later, he and friend Max Holtzem flew the two aircraft to Rosario as another demonstration. Udet himself returned to Germany before the Copa Wilbur Wright was contested.

The final fate of the U 2 that was shipped to Argentina is not known.

== Specifications ==
Data from Birchal 2013, p.36

General characteristics

- Crew: 1 pilot
- Capacity: 1 passenger
- Length: 5.53 m (18 ft 2 in)
- Wingspan: 8.9 m (29 ft 2 in)
- Height: 2.1 m (6 ft 11 in)
- Wing area: 8.9 m^{2} (96 sq ft)
- Empty weight: 230 kg (507 lb)
- Gross weight: 370 kg (816 lb)
- Powerplant: 1 × Haacke HFM 2 two-cylinder, horizontally-opposed, air-cooled piston engine, 26 kW (35 hp) (35 PS)

Performance

- Maximum speed: 150 km/h (93 mph, 81 kn)

== Notes ==
=== Bibliography ===
- Bichel, Olaf (2013). Die Flugzeuge der Udet Flugzeugbau GmbH [The aeroplanes of the Udet Flugzeugbau company] (in German). Oberschleißheim: Bayerische Flugzeug-Historiker eV.
- The Illustrated Encyclopedia of Aircraft. Vol. 13. London: Aerospace Publishing. 1984.
- Taylor, Michael J. H. (1993). Jane's Encyclopedia of Aviation. London: Studio Editions.
