= Udet U 6 =

Two-seat sport aircraft built in Germany in the early 1920s

U 6

General information
- Type: Touring aircraft
- National origin: Germany
- Manufacturer: Udet Flugzeugbau
- Designer: Hans Henry Herrmann
- Number built: about 7

History
- First flight: 1923
- Developed from: Udet U 1

The Udet U 6 was a small, low-power sport aircraft developed in Germany in the early 1920s as an improved version of the Udet U 1.

Of around seven examples built, three received German civil registrations, D 325, D 330, and D 487

== Design ==
The U 6 was a low-wing cantilever monoplane of conventional design. It was powered by a single, piston engine mounted in the nose, driving a two-blade tractor propeller. It had a conventional tail and conventional, tailskid undercarriage.

The fuselage and tail unit were of all-wood construction. The wings were wooden as well, covered in fabric.

Although based on the series of Udet Flugzeugbau designs that started with the U 1, the U 6 was a substantially modified design. The pilot and passenger were still seated in tandem, but were now in separate, open cockpits. The angular tail fin of the U 1 was replaced with a rounded one, and the wing planform was more complex than the simple, trapezoidal shape of the U 1. The improved aerodynamics of the design resulted in an improvement in top speed of around 10 kilometres per hour (6.2 mph; 5.4 kn).

One example, D 325, was fitted with ski undercarriage.

== Operational history ==
Test flights of the U 6 began in July 1923, and in August, the aircraft was displayed at the Internationella luftfartsutställningen i Göteborg 1923 ("ILUG", "The International Aero Exhibition Gothenburg") show in Göteborg.

Company founder Ernst Udet also demonstrated the U 6 at the ADAC (Allgemeiner Deutscher Automobil-Club, "General German Automobile Club") rally at Garmisch-Partenkirchen in 1924. (The Winterfahrt or "winter rally" was held between 1–3 February that year.) Between 13–14 May the same year, he flew a U 6 on a 1,250-kilometre (780 mi) journey in several stages with passenger Countess Margot von Einsiedel.

More competition wins soon followed. On 18 May 1924, Ernst Udet and Franz Hailer flew U 6s to first and second place in the Ostpreußischen Samland-Küstenflug für Kleinflugzeuge ("East Prussian Samland coastal flight for small aeroplanes") event from Dessau to Königsberg organised by the Ostpreußischen Verein für Luftfahrt ("East Prussian aviation association").

Eduardo Olivero used a U 6 to set an unofficial South American altitude record for an aircraft in its class at Castelar, Argentina, on 28 May 1924. With passenger Maria Elena Ortiz Machado, he climbed to 3,400 metres (11,200 ft) in 2 hours, 10 minutes. This particular machine was later bought by Carlos Ardohein, who suffered a fatal crash in it near Buenos Aires on 27 February 1926.

U 6s were used at a number of German flying schools. At least one of these, Oberbayerische Sportflug ("Upper Bavarian sport flying") in Schleissheim regarded it as unsuitable for beginners and reserved it for more experienced students. A U 6a was also ordered by a Mexican flying school, but it is not now known how far this order proceeded.

== Variants ==
U 6
original version with Siemens-Halske Sh 4 engine
U 6a
version with Siemens-Halske Sh 5 engine

== Operators ==
Flying schools:

- Arbeitsgemeinschaft der Flieger, Würzburg, Germany
- Oberbayerische Sportflug, Schleissheim, Germany
- Ortloff, Berlin, Germany
- Relakraft, Königsberg, Germany

== Specifications ==
Data from Birchal 2013, p.51

General characteristics

- Crew: 1 pilot
- Capacity: 1 passenger
- Length: 5.50 m (18 ft 1 in)
- Wingspan: 8.90 m (29 ft 2 in)
- Height: 1.97 m (6 ft 6 in)
- Wing area: 12 m^{2} (130 sq ft)
- Empty weight: 470 kg (1,036 lb)
- Gross weight: 800 kg (1,764 lb)
- Powerplant: 1 × Siemens-Halske Sh 4 five-cylinder, radial, air-cooled piston engine, 47.5 kW (63.7 hp) (65 PS)

Performance

- Maximum speed: 150 km/h (93 mph, 81 kn)

== Notes ==
=== Bibliography ===
- Bichel, Olaf (2013). Die Flugzeuge der Udet Flugzeugbau GmbH [The aeroplanes of the Udet Flugzeugbau company] (in German). Oberschleißheim: Bayerische Flugzeug-Historiker eV.
- The Illustrated Encyclopedia of Aircraft. Vol. 13. London: Aerospace Publishing. 1984.
- Taylor, Michael J. H. (1993). Jane's Encyclopedia of Aviation. London: Studio Editions.
