= Udet U 3 =

Sport aircraft built in Germany in the early 1920s and raced in Argentina

U 3

General information
- Type: Low power sport aircraft
- National origin: Germany
- Manufacturer: Udet Flugzeugbau
- Designer: Hans Henry Herrmann

History
- First flight: 1923
- Developed from: Udet U 1

The Udet U 3 was a small, low-power sport aircraft developed in Germany in the early 1920s as an improved version of the Udet U 1.

Some confusion exists today around the Udet U 3 and U 4 designations. In an article written in 1925, Udet Flugzeugbau chief designer Hans Henry Herrmann attaches the U 3 designation to the Udet aircraft that competed in air races in Argentina in 1923. Photographs of this aircraft show it to be a single-seater, although a contemporary account of the aircraft describes it as a two-seater, At least two later reference works apply the U 4 designation to the aircraft that raced in Argentina. while a contemporary photo of an aircraft entered on the German registry as a U 4 (D-203, registered to Bäumer Aero in Hamburg) shows a radial-powered two-seater with a forward fuselage contoured very differently from the aircraft that raced in Argentina.

Attempting to reconcile the various discrepancies, aviation historian Olaf Bichel speculates that the U 3 and U 4 might have been very closely related designs, and even possibly that they were convertible between single-seat and two-seat configurations via a removable fairing over the forward cockpit. When Bichel wrote his monograph on the various Udet-produced aircraft, no separate specifications were available for the U 4.

== Design ==
The U 3 was a low-wing cantilever monoplane of conventional design. It was powered by a single, piston engine mounted in the nose, driving a two-blade tractor propeller. It had a conventional tail and conventional, tailskid undercarriage. The pilot sat in an open cockpit.

The fuselage was of all-wood construction. The wings were wooden as well, covered in fabric. The tail unit was built from steel tube, and also fabric-covered.

The U 1 and U 2 had been powered by two-cylinder engines of 26 kilowatts (35 hp), which had proved insufficient. Instead, the U 3 was fitted with a five-cylinder radial engine with nearly 60% more power.

== Operational history ==
By 1923, it was apparent that the founding aim of the Udet Flugzeugbau company, selling low-price aircraft to the United States, was unrealistic. Therefore, an invitation for company founder Ernst Udet to compete in the Copa Wilbur Wright ("Wilbur Wright Cup") in Argentina was timely because it provided an opportunity to promote the company's products in a new market.

One U 2 and a U 3 were shipped to South America, arriving on 28 May 1923. They were transported to the Escuela de Aviación Militar at El Palomar for assembly. On 10 June, Udet demonstrated both aircraft at San Isidro in their first display flights. Five days later, he and friend Max Holtzem flew the two aircraft to Rosario as another demonstration. Udet himself returned to Germany before the Copa Wilbur Wright was contested.

On 5 August 1923, in the first round of the competition, the U 3, flown by Eduardo Olivero covered the 156-kilometre (97 mi) course in 1 hour, 6 minutes, and 15 seconds, finishing in 9th place. In the next round, on 19 August, Olivero flew the U 3 to an altitude of 4,000 metres (13,000 ft), but was unsuccessful in this round. It did, however, win first place in a handicap race out of a field of 22 competitors, including against a Fokker C.V with an engine eight times more powerful.

On 19 November, Olivera flew the U 3 in a different competition in Argentina, the "19 November Prize". The course was five laps of a route between Buenos Aires and La Plata, roughly 60 kilometres (37 miles) away. Olivero and the U 3 finished in 4th place, with an average speed of 179.8 kilometres per hour (111.7 mph; 97.1 kn).

Olivero won first place with the U 3 in its class in the Rosario–Buenos Aires air race on 9 December, flying the 135-kilometre (84 mi) circuit in 1 hour, 9 minutes, and 31 seconds. On 24 May the following year, Luis Luro (brother of celebrated race-car driver Jorge Luro piloted the U 3 in the Copa Gobernado Cantilo ("Governor Cantilo Cup", named for José Luis Cantilo, then Governor of Buenos Aires Province). Luro won the prize, with a time of 1 hour, 22 minutes, 39 seconds.

== Specifications ==
Data from Birchal 2013, p.42

General characteristics

- Crew: 1 pilot
- Length: 5.53 m (18 ft 2 in)
- Wingspan: 8.9 m (29 ft 2 in)
- Height: 2.1 m (6 ft 11 in)
- Wing area: 8.9 m^{2} (96 sq ft)
- Empty weight: 310 kg (683 lb)
- Gross weight: 450 kg (992 lb)
- Powerplant: 1 × Siemens-Halske Sh 4 five-cylinder, radial, air-cooled piston engine, 41 kW (55 hp) (55 PS)

Performance

- Maximum speed: 180 km/h (110 mph, 97 kn)

== Notes ==
=== Bibliography ===
- Bichel, Olaf (2013). Die Flugzeuge der Udet Flugzeugbau GmbH [The aeroplanes of the Udet Flugzeugbau company] (in German). Oberschleißheim: Bayerische Flugzeug-Historiker eV.
- Herrmann, Hans Henry Herrmann (28 May 1925). "Udet-Flugzeuge" [Udet aeroplanes]. Illustrierte Flug-Woche [Illustrated Flight-Week] (in German). 7 (11). Leipzig: Stein & Krohl: 208–09.
- The Illustrated Encyclopedia of Aircraft. Vol. 13. London: Aerospace Publishing. 1984.
- Taylor, Michael J. H. (1993). Jane's Encyclopedia of Aviation. London: Studio Editions.
