= Udet U 8 =

U 8 Limousine
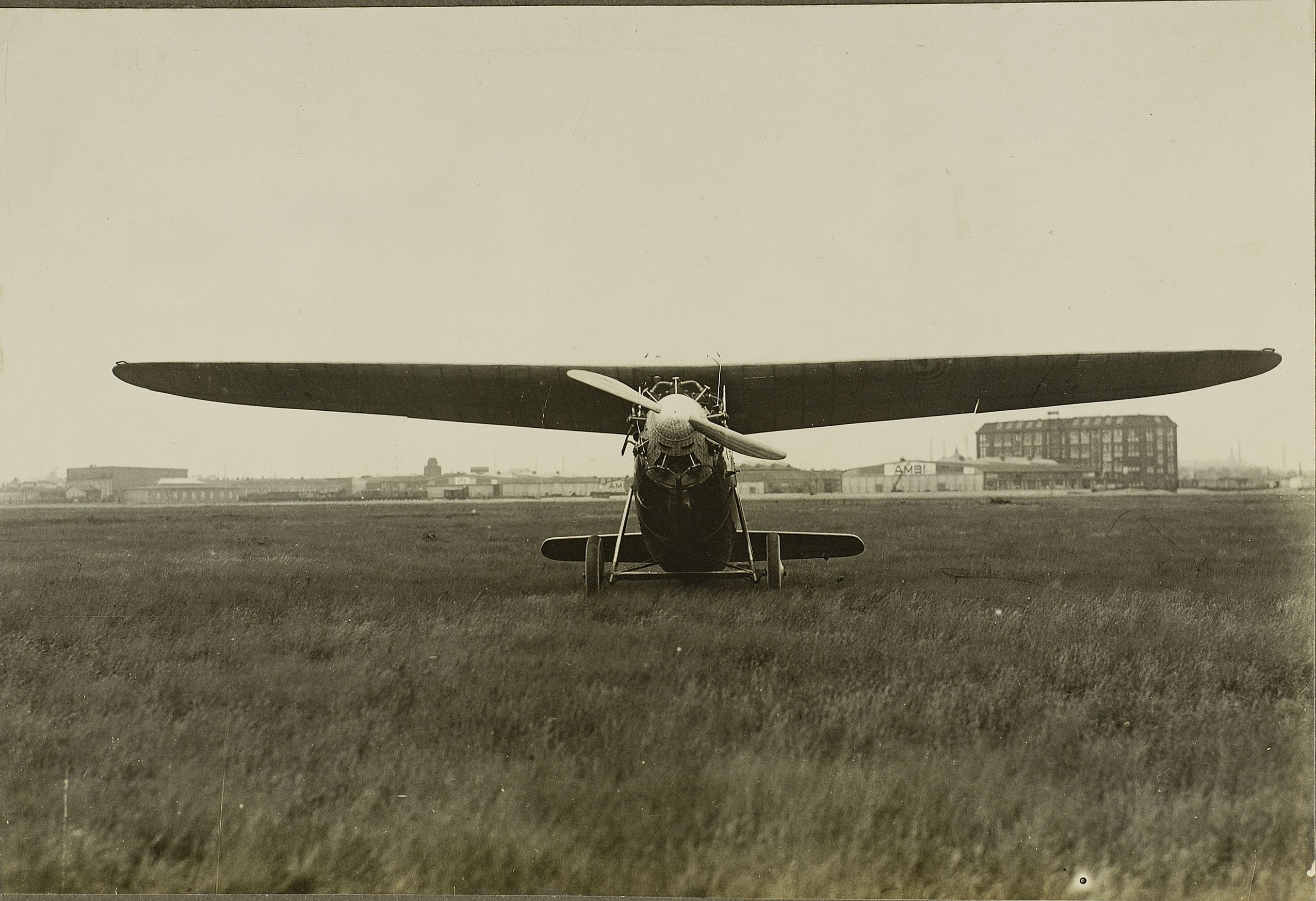
- U 8 with 9-cylinder Siemens-Halske engine

General information
- Type: three passenger transport aircraft
- National origin: Germany
- Manufacturer: Udet Flugzeugbau
- Designer: Hans Henry Herrmann
- Number built: 5

History
- First flight: 1924
- Developed from: Udet U 5

The parasol wing, single engine Udet U 8, sometimes referred to as the Limousine, was a three-seat commercial passenger transport designed and built in Germany in 1924. Five were produced and were used by German airlines until about 1928.

== Design and development ==
The first Udet passenger transport was the two-passenger U 5, which appeared in 1923. (Note: The two 1923 references do not give the type number but Flight's image shows the registration was D-302. This is identified in the cited German register as the U 5.) This was powered by a 52 kW (70 hp), seven-cylinder, Siemens-Halske Sh 5 radial engine. The following year Udet produced the first U 8, which had a 75 kW (100 hp) nine-cylinder, Siemens-Halske Sh 6 radial, making it rather heavier than the U 5 but leaving the design only slightly changed and the dimensions unaltered. The new engine allowed the U 8 to carry three passengers.

The cantilever, one-piece parasol wing of the U.8 was trapezoidal in plan, with long, elliptical tips. It had a thick section which thinned outwards and was built around two spruce box spars and fabric covered. Its ailerons tapered in chord out to the wing tips; together, they occupied 45% of the span. The wing was mounted a little above the fuselage on four short struts, two to each spar, an unusual arrangement used earlier on the U 5 and chosen by its designer, Hans Herrmanns, to improve both the aerodynamics at the wing-fuselage junction and cabin ventilation, a problem in small cabin aircraft of the time. Under the wing, part of the cabin roof was open. The wing struts, uncovered on the U 5, were covered by longitudinal panels.

At least three types of radial engines powered the five U.8s known to have been built. The first examples had the Siemens-Halske Sh 6 but later both nine-cylinder, 82 kW (110 hp) Siemens-Halske Sh 12s and a 3-cylinder, 81 kW (109 hp) Bristol Lucifer. No images of the Bristol installation are known but the German radials were cleanly cowled by the standards of their time, before either Townend rings or NACA cowlings had been introduced, and with quite large spinners but with cylinder heads exposed for cooling.

One advantage of the gap between fuselage and wing was that the pilot's open cockpit could be placed under the wing leading edge rather than set into it, spoiling its aerodynamics. Entry into the plywood covered fuselage was through a port-side door under the wing; the three-seat cabin had pairs of windows on each side and a baggage space behind with its own door.

At the rear the fuselage became quite slender, with a high mounted, long span, cantilever and almost rectangular plan tailplane with high aspect ratio elevators. The tailplane incidence could be adjusted in-flight. Its quadrant-shaped fin mounted a rudder which extended down to the keel. The U 8 had fixed, conventional landing gear of the single axle type which was more refined than that of the U5, with a longer oleo strut to mid-fuselage and rearward drag struts. There was a short tailskid.

In about 1925 at least one Udet 8 was fitted with full-span Lippmann/Handley Page slats coupled to full-span ailerons which were lowered together as camber increasing flaps when the slats were deployed. It was one of the earliest German aircraft to have slats. The slatted Udet 8 was recorded as a Udet 8a or Udet 8B in contemporary journals, though a modern source states that the U 8a (D-839) had a new wing with an area increase of 7 m^{2} (75 sq ft) and a Sh-12 engine. D-839 is recorded as a U 8b in a reconstructed register.

== Operational history ==
In 1925 one U 8, D-670, competed in the "Round Germany Flight", one of only two commercial types to do so. Powered during the contest by the Bristol Lucifer engine (it had a nine-cylinder Siemens at another time), it successfully completed all five circuits of the contest, a total of distance of 5,242 km (3,257 mi; 2,830 nmi) but, with a more powerful engine than most in its class (C}, was ranked only ninth. Another Udet entrant, the two seat Udet U 10, won class B.

The five U 8s were initially used by Deutsche Aero Lloyd, but two of them were transferred to Nordbayeriche Verkehrsflug when Aero Lloyd became Deutsche Lufthansa in 1926. One of these (D-670) crashed soon after. It was transferred to the DVS and was joined there by D-839 later in the year.

== Specifications (Siemens-Halske Sh 6 engine) ==
Data from Flight, May 1925

General characteristics

- Crew: One
- Capacity: three passengers
- Length: 7.12 m (23 ft 4 in)
- Wingspan: 12.0 m (39 ft 4 in)
- Height: 2.67 m (8 ft 9 in)
- Wing area: 18 m^{2} (190 sq ft)
- Empty weight: 490 kg (1,080 lb)
- Gross weight: 860 kg (1,896 lb)
- Powerplant: 1 × Siemens-Halske Sh 6 9-cylinder radial, 75 kW (100 hp)
- Propellers: 2-bladed

Performance

- Maximum speed: 170 km/h (110 mph, 92 kn)
- Cruise speed: 140 km/h (87 mph, 76 kn)
- Service ceiling: 3,000 m (9,800 ft)
- Maximum glide ratio: 1:14
- Time to altitude: 13.5 min to 1,000 m (3,300 ft)
