= Dobkevičius =

- Lithuanian surname
- m.: Dobkevičius
- f.: (unmarried): Dobkevičiūtė
- f.: (married): Dobkevičienė
- Related names: Polish: Dobkiewicz (Добкевич, Dobkevych, Dobkevich)

Dobkevičius is a Lithuanian surname. Notable people with the surname include:

- Jonas Dobkevičius (1866–1934), Lithuanian economist, politician and public figure
- Jurgis Dobkevičius (23 March 1900 – 8 June 1926) was a pioneering aviator and aircraft designer in interwar Lithuania.
