= Arado W 2 =

W 2
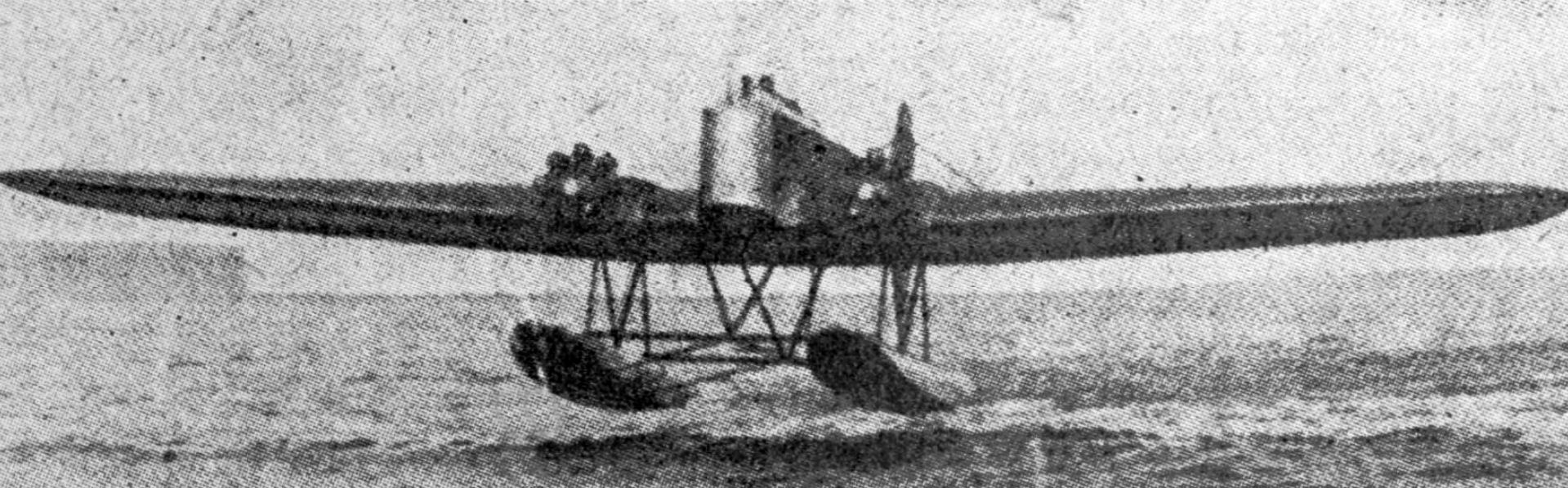

General information
- Type: Seaplane Trainer
- Manufacturer: Arado
- Primary user: Deutsche Verkehrsfliegerschule
- Number built: 2

History
- First flight: 1928

The Arado W 2 was a two-seat twin-engine seaplane trainer developed for the DVS in 1928. It was a cantilever monoplane with a fabric-covered steel tube fuselage that accommodated the pilot and instructor in tandem open cockpits. The undercarriage consisted of two pontoons carried on steel struts.

== Specifications ==
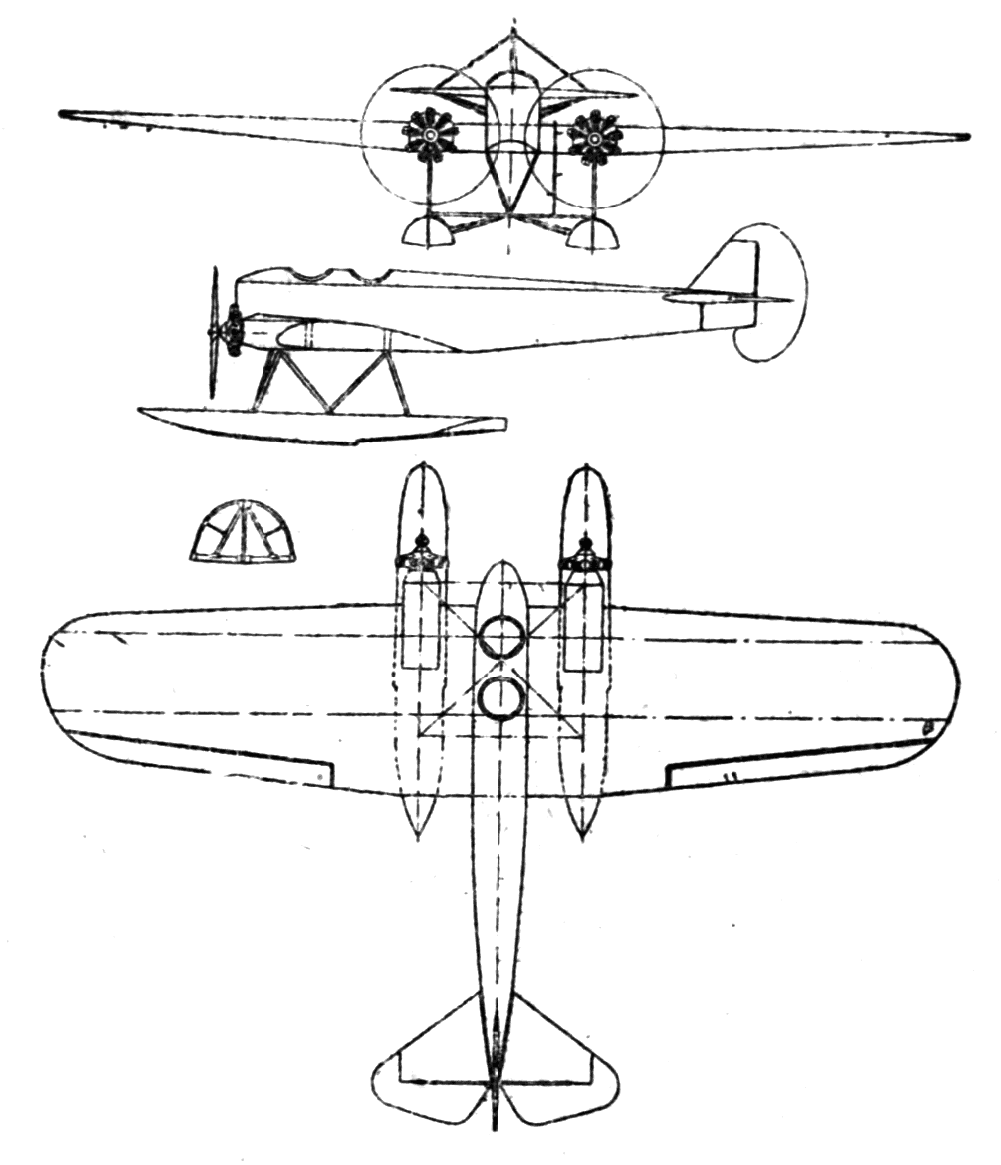
Arado W II 3-view drawing from Le Document aéronautique December,1928

Data from Jane's all the World's Aircraft 1928

General characteristics

- Crew: 2=
- Length: 12.55 m (41 ft 2 in)
- Wingspan: 17.4 m (57 ft 1 in)
- Height: 3.2 m (10 ft 6 in)
- Wing area: 53.8 m^{2} (579 sq ft)
- Empty weight: 1,600 kg (3,527 lb)
- Max takeoff weight: 2,000 kg (4,409 lb)
- Powerplant: 2 × Siemens-Halske Sh.12 9-cylinder air-cooled radial piston engines, 82 kW (110 hp) each
- Propellers: 2-bladed fixed pitch propellers

Performance

- Maximum speed: 145 km/h (90 mph, 78 kn)
- Minimum control speed: 72 km/h (45 mph, 39 kn)
- Service ceiling: 2,060 m (6,760 ft)
- Rate of climb: 1 m/s (200 ft/min)
- Time to altitude: 2,000 m (6,600 ft) in 35 minutes
- Wing loading: 37 kg/m^{2} (7.6 lb/sq ft)
- Power/mass: 0.0812 kW/kg (0.0494 hp/lb)
