= Albatros L 79 =

L 79 Kobold

General information
- Type: Aerobatic aircraft
- Manufacturer: Albatros Flugzeugwerke
- Number built: 2

History
- First flight: 1929

The Albatros L 79 Kobold was a single-seat German aerobatic aircraft of the 1920s and 1930s. It was a single-bay biplane with unstaggered, equal-span wings that had a symmetrical airfoil intended to ensure performance during inverted flight.

== Specifications (L 79) ==
General characteristics

- Crew: one pilot
- Length: 6.27 m (20 ft 7 in)
- Wingspan: 8.80 m (28 ft 10 in)
- Height: 2.24 m (7 ft 4 in)
- Wing area: 16.6 m^{2} (179 sq ft)
- Empty weight: 465 kg (1,025 lb)
- Gross weight: 640 kg (1,411 lb)
- Powerplant: 1 × Siemens-Halske Sh 12 , 93 kW (125 hp)

Performance

- Maximum speed: 165 km/h (100 mph, 87 kn)
- Endurance: 2.5 hours
- Rate of climb: 3.2 m/s (630 ft/min)
