= Udet U 7 Kolibri =

U 7 Kolibri
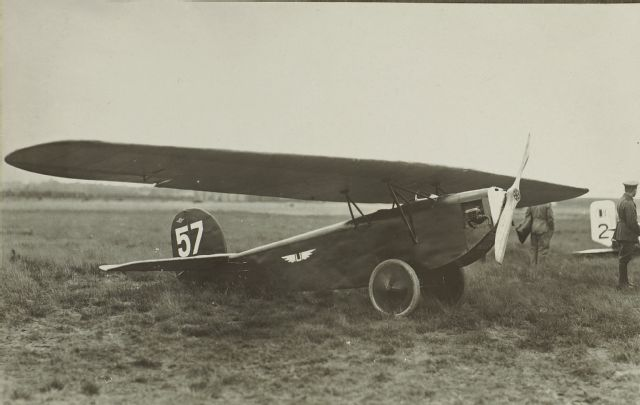

General information
- Type: Single seat light aircraft
- National origin: Germany
- Manufacturer: Udet Flugzeugbau
- Number built: 2

History
- First flight: before mid-1924

The Udet U 7 Kolibri (Hummingbird) was a single engine, single seat, parasol wing light aircraft, designed and built in Germany in the mid-1920s. Though they had some competition success and set an unofficial lightplane duration record, only two were produced.

== Design and development ==
The wooden, cantilever, two-spar wing of the U 7 was almost trapezoidal in plan, with sweep on the leading edge, out to ellipsoidal tips. It also thinned outwards in section with most of the taper on the upper surface, giving some anhedral. Short ailerons extended to the tips. The wing was mounted over the fuselage on six streamlined steel struts; two upright tripods ran from the forward spar to points on the upper and mid fuselage and two inverted V-struts joined the rear spar to the upper fuselage.

When the U 7 first appeared in 1924 it was powered by a 13 kW (18 hp) Douglas 500 cm^{3} (31 cu in) flat twin, mounted in a squared-off cowling with its cylinders exposed for cooling. By June 1924 this had been replaced by a 26 kW (35 hp) Douglas750 cm^{3} (46 cu in) flat twin. In the summer of 1925, one of the two U 7s built had a 22–25 kW (30–34 hp) ABC Scorpion flat twin, similarly enclosed. Behind the engine the rectangular section fuselage was plywood covered, with an open cockpit under the wing.

The Kolibri's tail was conventional, with a trapezoidal plan tailplane and elevators mounted on top of the fuselage and with a quadrantal fin and a rounded rudder that reached down to the keel. It had a very simple, fixed, tailskid undercarriage with the mainwheels on a short single axle held just below the fuselage underside, making the track narrow.

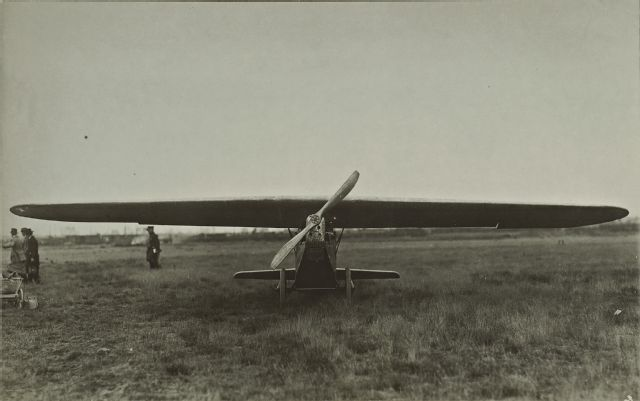

== Operational history ==
The U 7s took part in several contests. One of the earliest was the August 1924 Rhön meeting for gliders and lightplanes. There were thirty of the latter, though several were motorised gliders rather than sports tourers. The weather was not good, with high winds, and the Kolibri, flown by Udet, was the only one of three powered aircraft to complete the 80 km (50 mi; 43 nmi) round trip from the Wasserkuppe to Kissingen and back, thus winning first prize. In October 1924 Udet, again starting from the Wasserkuppe, flew the U 7 for 4 hr 39 min, an unofficial record for very light aircraft. There was no official recognition of this class of aircraft at the time.

The two Kolibris, fitted with the engines used at the Rhön, flew in the demanding "Round Germany Flight" which began on 9 June 1925. They were expected to do well but the ABC powered machine had to make two forced landings on the first day, resulting in some damage. Neither was amongst the small group from the lowest power class that completed enough circuits to be amongst the prizes; the winner was the Daimler L21.

== Specifications ==
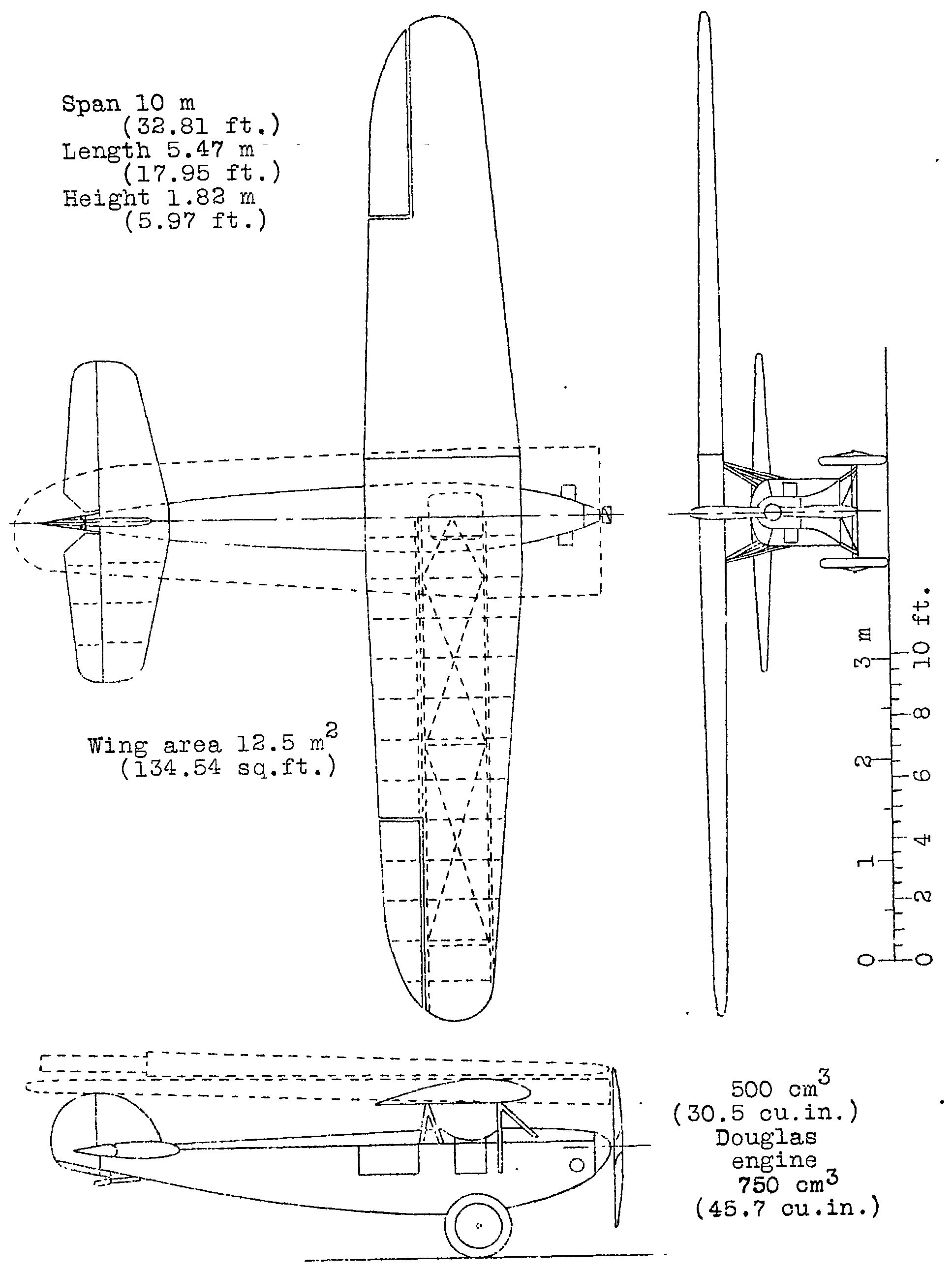
Udet U 7 Kolibri 3-view drawing from NACA-TM-301

Data from Flight, July 1924

General characteristics

- Crew: One
- Length: 5.47 m (17 ft 11 in)
- Wingspan: 10 m (32 ft 10 in)
- Height: 1.82 m (6 ft 0 in)
- Wing area: 12.5 m^{2} (135 sq ft)
- Empty weight: 150 kg (331 lb)
- Gross weight: 250 kg (551 lb)
- Powerplant: 1 × Douglas 500 cm^{3} (31 cu in) flat twin, 13 kW (18 hp) ; consumption 6 L (370 cu in) /hr
- Propellers: 2-bladed

Performance

- Maximum speed: 120 km/h (75 mph, 65 kn)
- Range: 480 km (300 mi, 260 nmi)
- Time to altitude: 8 min to 1,000 m (3,300 ft)
- Landing speed: 50 km/h (31 mph)
