= Siemens-Halske Sh 12 =

Type of engine

Sh 12
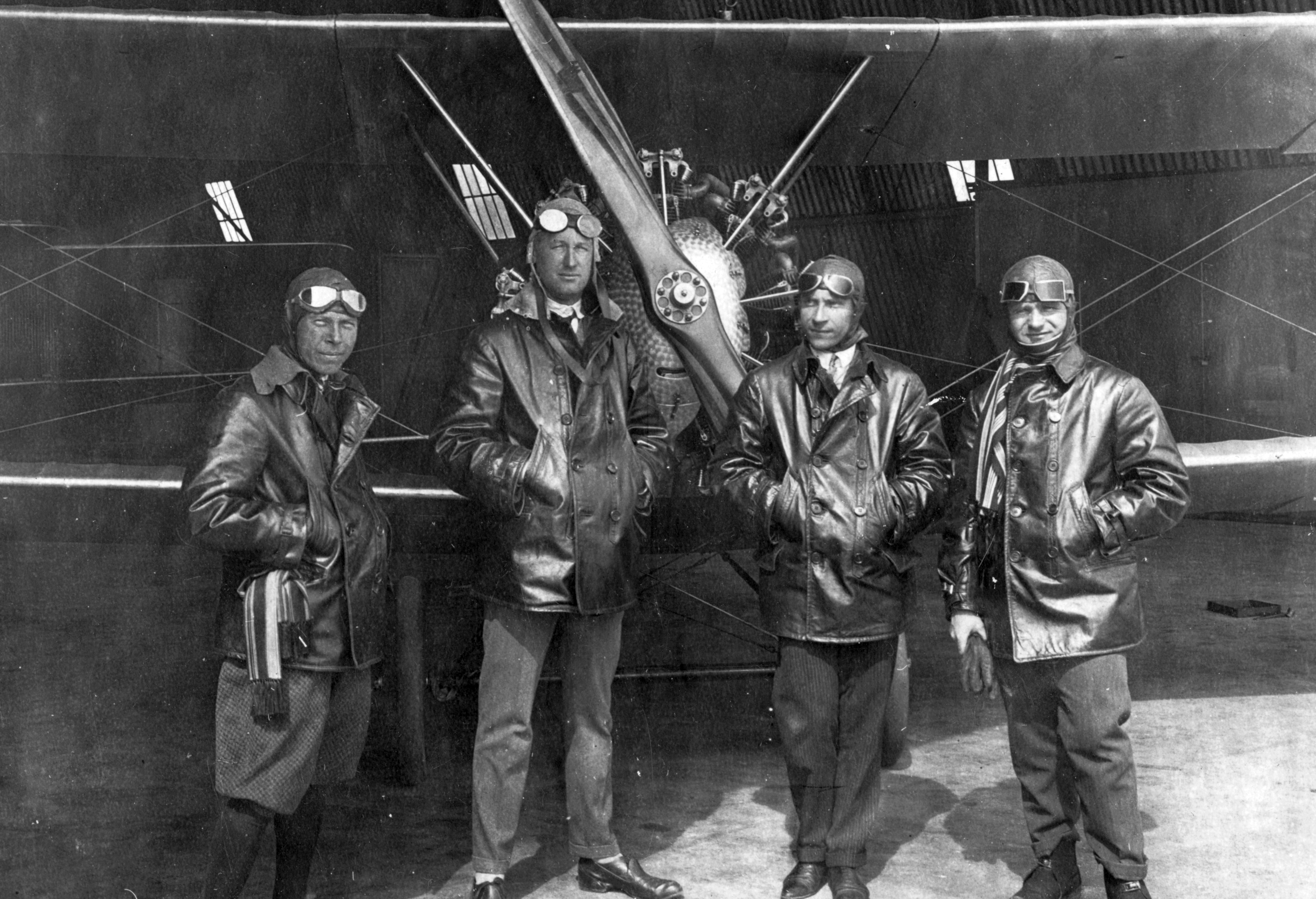
- An Sh 12 fitted to a Hungarian Udet U-12 licence-built by Weiss-Manfred in Hungary
- Type: Radial engine
- Manufacturer: Siemens-Halske
- First run: 1925

The Siemens-Halske Sh 12 was a nine-cylinder, air-cooled, radial engine for aircraft built in Germany in the 1920s. First run in 1925, it was rated at 80 kW (110 hp). The Sh 12 was also produced in the United States by Ryan Aeronautical Corp. as the Ryan-Siemens 9.

== Applications ==
- Albatros L 68
- Albatros L 79
- Arado S I
- Arado W 2
- BFW M.21
- BFW M.27
- Bücker Bü 133 Jungmeister
- Command-Aire 3C3-B
- Lampich BL-6
- Raab-Katzenstein KL.1
- Udet U 8
- Udet U 11 Kondor
- Udet U 12 Flamingo
- VL Sääski
- Weiss-EM-10 Ölyv
- Lóczy Hungária
