= Dobi-III =

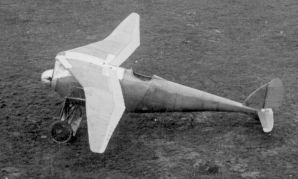

General information
- Type: Fighter
- National origin: Lithuania
- Manufacturer: Dobi
- Designer: Jurgis Dobkevičius

History
- First flight: November 1924
- Retired: 8 July 1926

Dobi-III is the third and the last aircraft designed by Lithuanian aviator Jurgis Dobkevičius. Fighter Dobi-III was designed and tested in 1924. On June 8, 1926, it crashed at Kaunas Aerodrome killing its designer.

The Dobi-III used the same powerplant as Lithuanian Fokker D.VII aircraft (a BMW IIIa), was covered in a plywood skin (except the fabric covered flaps), and would have been armed with two Vickers machine guns (not fitted). Due to its poor visibility it was dubbed the "blind cow" by the German press.

== Specifications ==
General characteristics

- Crew: 1
- Length: 6.4 m (21 ft 0 in)
- Wingspan: 12.5 m (41 ft 0 in)
- Powerplant: 1 × BMW IIIa 6-cyl. water-cooled in-line piston engine, 136 kW (182 hp)

Performance

- Maximum speed: 250 km/h (160 mph, 130 kn)

== See also ==
- Dobi-I
- Dobi-II
