= Albatros L 59 =

L 59
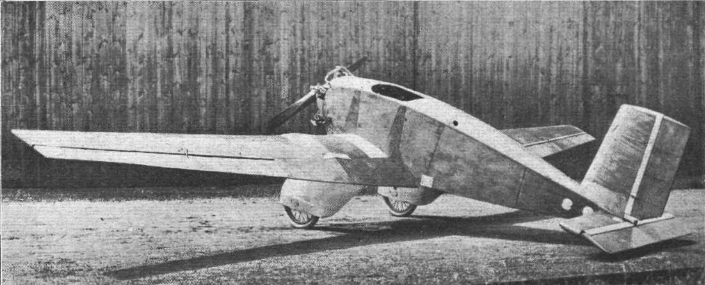

General information
- Type: Sport aircraft
- Manufacturer: Albatros Flugzeugwerke

History
- Manufactured: 4 (both variants)
- First flight: 1923

The Albatros L 59 was a single-seat German utility aircraft of the 1920s. It was a single-engine low-wing cantilever monoplane with large, spatted wide track undercarriage attached, unusually for the time not to the fuselage but to the wing roots. The whole aircraft was covered in 3-ply.

The L.59 was flying by September 1923.

== Variants ==
L.59
Single seat, 60 hp (45 kW) Siemens-Halske Sh.4 5-cylinder radial. One built.
L.60
Two seats, 80 hp (60 kW) Siemens-Halske Sh 5 7-cylinder radial. Identical dimensions, slightly heavier empty and faster both level and climbing. Three built.

== Specifications (L 59) ==
Data from Flight 13 September 1923, pp. 581–2

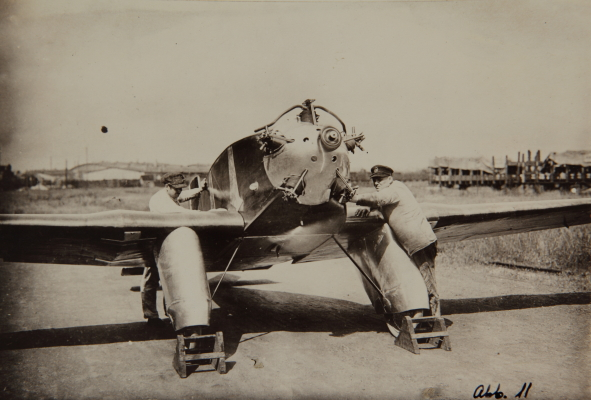
L.59

General characteristics

- Crew: one pilot
- Length: 5.40 m (17 ft 9 in)
- Wingspan: 10.30 m (33 ft 9 in)
- Height: 2.65 m (8 ft 8 in)
- Wing area: 10.0 m^{2} (108 sq ft)
- Empty weight: 350 kg (772 lb)
- Gross weight: 485 kg (1,069 lb)
- Powerplant: 1 × Siemens-Halske Sh.4 5-cylinder radial , 45 kW (60 hp)

Performance

- Maximum speed: 140 km/h (90 mph, 78 kn) at 3,000 m (9,840 ft)
- Range: 525 km (327 mi, 284 nmi)
- Rate of climb: 1.9 m/s (365 ft/min) to 1,000 m (3,280 ft)
