= Dobi-I =

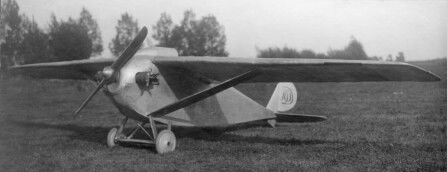

General information
- Type: Experimental aircraft
- National origin: Lithuania
- Designer: Jurgis Dobkevičius
- Status: Retired

History
- First flight: 1922
- Retired: 1925

The Dobi-I was designed by Lithuanian aviator Jurgis Dobkevičius and the first airplane of Lithuanian design. Jurgis Dobkevičius started designing and building Dobi-I in 1921, and it was first tested by its designer in July 1922. The single Dobi-I prototype was damaged beyond repair in an accident on 1 December 1925.

== Specifications ==
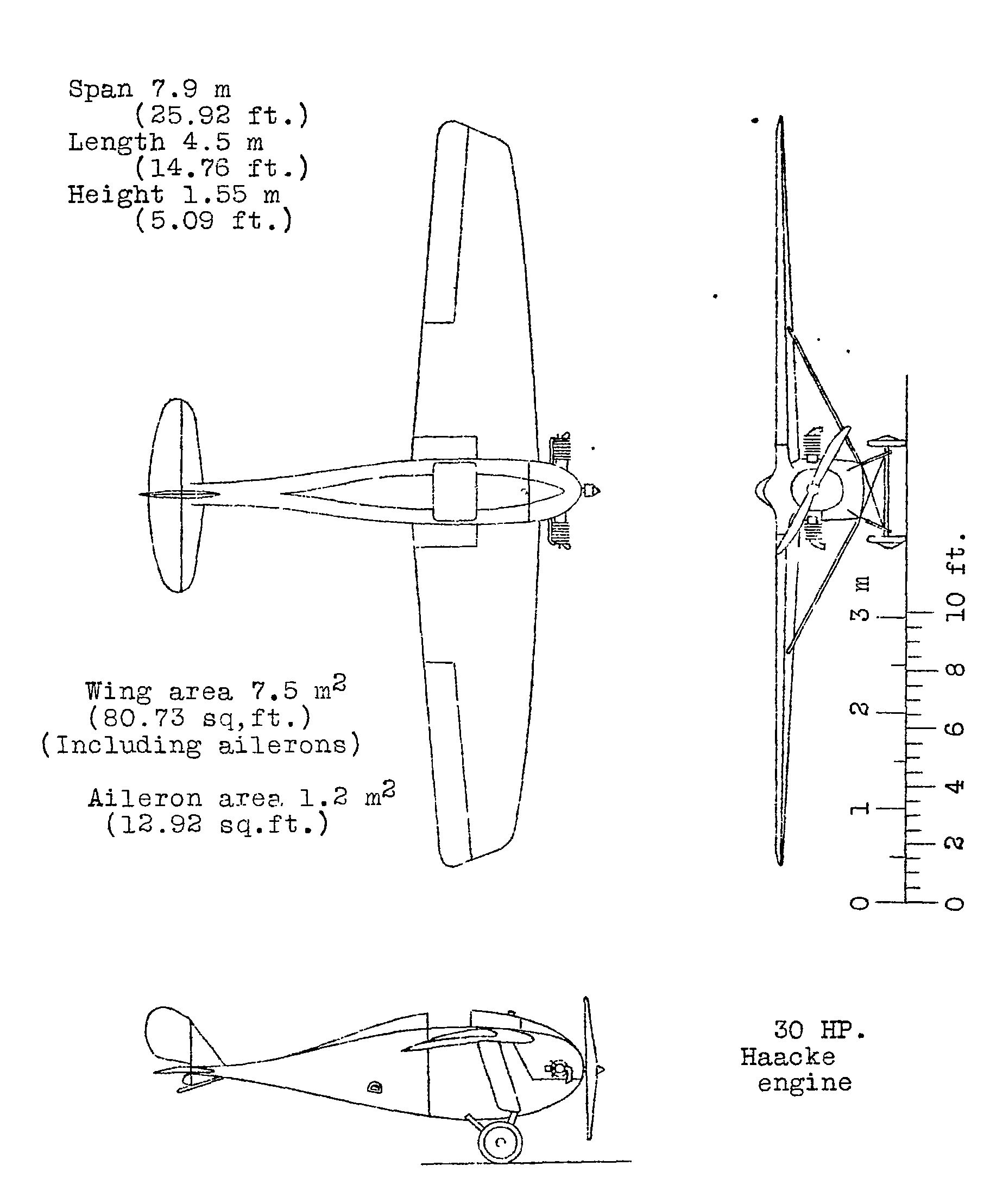
Dobi-I 3-view drawing from NACA-TM-301

Data from Les Ailes March 1924

General characteristics

- Crew: One
- Length: 4.50 m (14 ft 9 in)
- Wingspan: 7.90 m (25 ft 11 in)
- Wing area: 7.50 m^{2} (80.7 sq ft)
- Empty weight: 167 kg (368 lb)
- Gross weight: 295 kg (650 lb)
- Fuel capacity: 60 L (13 imp gal; 16 US gal)
- Powerplant: 1 × Haacke HFM-2 flat twin, 22 kW (30 hp)
- Propellers: 2-bladed

Performance

- Maximum speed: 175 km/h (109 mph, 94 kn)
- Cruise speed: 130 km/h (81 mph, 70 kn)
- Service ceiling: 3,800 m (12,500 ft)
- Time to altitude: 6 min to 1,000 m (3,300 ft)

== See also ==
- Dobi-II
- Dobi-III
