= Dobi-II =

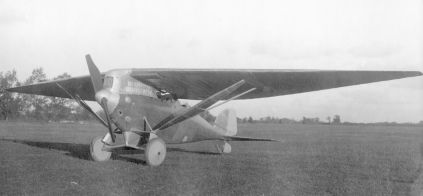

General information
- Type: Reconnaissance aircraft
- National origin: Lithuania
- Manufacturer: Dobi
- Designer: Jurgis Dobkevičius

History
- First flight: October 1923

The Dobi-II is the second airplane designed by Lithuanian aviator Jurgis Dobkevičius in 1922. It was tested in October 1923. After two landing accidents plans for mass production of Dobi-II were abandoned.

The Dobi-II had long ailerons and were able to be folded due to an internal mechanism. This was most likely done to reduce storage, as the Dobi-II was intended for military usage. During the 1923's the Dobi-II was one of the fastest planes among the two seat aircraft with 200 hp engines. Additionally the hanging control column was used in the Dobi-II.

== Specifications ==
Data from Lithuanian Air Museum

General characteristics

- Crew: 2
- Length: 6.1 m (20 ft 0 in)
- Wingspan: 14 m (45 ft 11 in)
- Wing area: 22.44 m^{2} (241.5 sq ft)
- Empty weight: 840 kg (1,852 lb)
- Gross weight: 1,240 kg (2,734 lb)
- Powerplant: 1 × Benz Bz.IV 6-cylinder water-cooled inline piston engine, 150 kW (200 hp)

Performance

- Maximum speed: 248 km/h (154 mph, 134 kn)
- Cruise speed: 190 km/h (120 mph, 100 kn)
- Stall speed: 90 km/h (56 mph, 49 kn)
- Range: 1,000 km (620 mi, 540 nmi)
- Service ceiling: 9,000 m (30,000 ft)
- Time to altitude: 34 min to 7,000 m (23,000 ft)
- Landing speed: 85 km/h (53 mph; 46 kn)

== See also ==
- Dobi-I
- Dobi-III
