= Silesia S-3 =

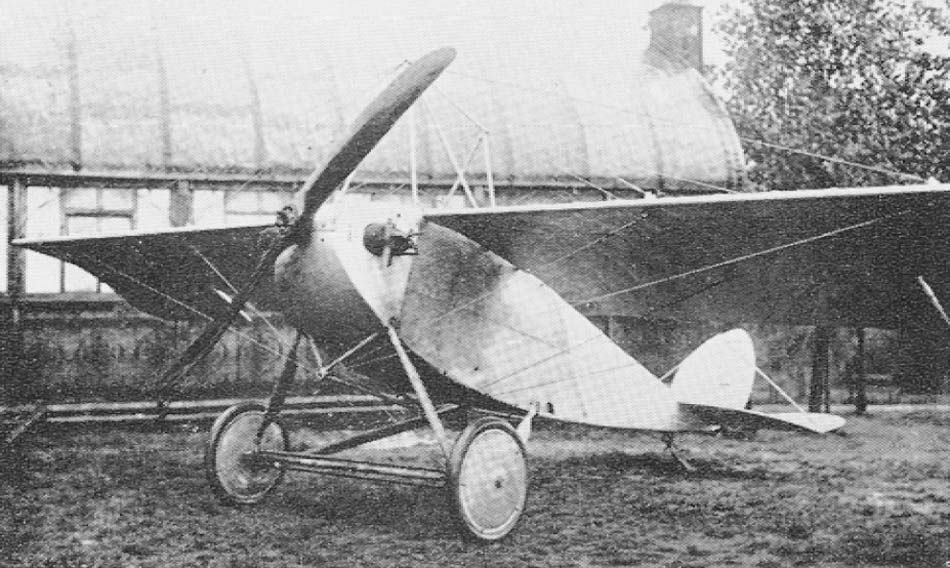

General information
- Type: Single seat light aircraft
- National origin: Poland
- Manufacturer: Pierwsza Śląska Fabryka Samolotów
- Designer: Sopora brothers
- Number built: 1

History
- First flight: Early November 1923

The Silesia S-3 was the first design from the Polish Sopora brothers to fly. It was a low power, single seat, high wing light aircraft. Only one was built and its flying time was limited.

== Design and development ==
Three brothers, Edward, Paul and Wojciech Sopora set up an aircraft-building workshop in 1923 at Chorzów, calling it the Pierwsza Śląska Fabryka Samolotów (First Silesian Aircraft Factory). Their first product was a light, low-powered, high wing monoplane, the Silesia S-3.

Its wood-framed, thin section wing was in two parts joined to the upper fuselage longerons and was fabric covered. It was entirely wire-braced from a high, central cabane above the fuselage and a short cabane from its underside.

The C-3 was powered by a 22 kW (30 hp) Haacke HFM-2, a flat-twin mounted with its cylinders projecting outside the fuselage for cooling. Behind the engine the fuselage was flat-sided, with a steel-tube frame of rectangular section and fabric covering. The single, open cockpit was behind the upper cabane. Its empennage was wood-framed and fabric covered; the tailplane, on top of the fuselage, was wire braced to the top of a rounded fin. The rudder was also rounded in profile.

Its fixed landing gear was of the tailskid type. The mainwheels were on a single axle which was mounted on two transverse tubes joining the apexes of two V-struts from the lower fuselage longerons.

== Operational history ==
The S-3 was completed by October 1923 and in early November it made its first flight, piloted by Klosek, from the army field at Panewniki near Ligota. Several modifications followed, in particular addressing some longitudinal stability problems experienced on the first flight. On 16 November Klosek began its official flight trials in front of army observers. It made three flights, each lasting 10–15 minutes, reaching speeds of about 100 km/h (62 mph; 54 kn), taking off in 70–100 m (230–330 ft) and with landing runs of 120–150 m (390–490 ft). The S-3 continued to make short flights into 1924 but after a landing accident the Soporas decided that its Haake engine should be removed to power their next design, the Silesia S-4 and the S-3 was abandoned.

== Specifications ==
Data from General:Cynk (1971). Performance:

General characteristics

- Crew: One
- Length: 4.5 m (14 ft 9 in)
- Wingspan: 8.6 m (28 ft 3 in)
- Height: 2.55 m (8 ft 4 in)
- Wing area: 12 m^{2} (130 sq ft)
- Empty weight: 345 kg (761 lb)
- Gross weight: 430 kg (948 lb)
- Powerplant: 1 × Haacke HFM-2 air-cooled flat twin engine, 22 kW (30 hp)
- Propellers: 2-bladed

Performance

- Maximum speed: 100 km/h (62 mph, 54 kn)
- Cruise speed: 85 km/h (53 mph, 46 kn)
- Stall speed: 65 km/h (40 mph, 35 kn) minimum speed
- Range: 80 km (50 mi, 43 nmi)
