= Silesia S-4 =

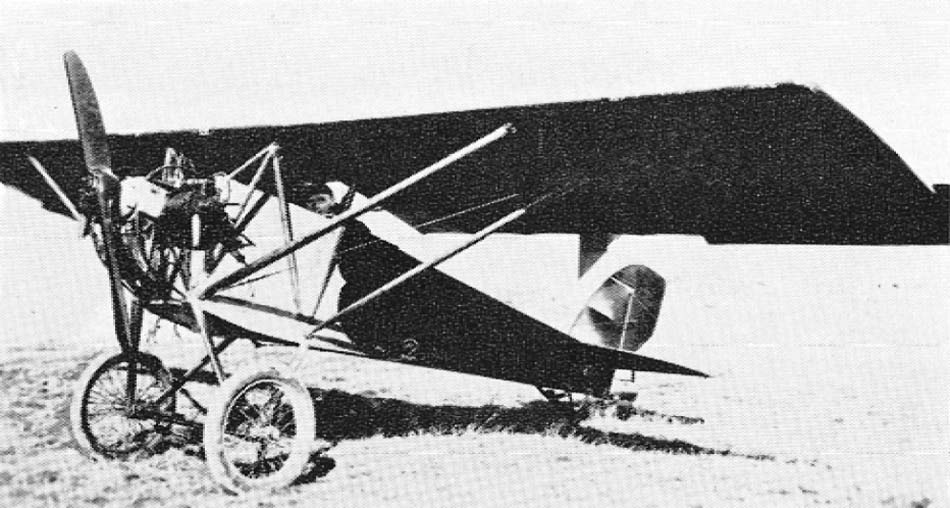

General information
- Type: Single seat light aircraft
- National origin: Poland
- Manufacturer: Pierwsza Śląska Fabryka Samolotów
- Designer: Sopora brothers
- Primary user: Silesian Aeroclub
- Number built: 1

History
- First flight: June 1925

The Silesia S-4 was a Polish, low-power parasol wing aircraft built in 1925. After an engine change and airframe modifications it became one of the Silesian Aeroclubs fleet. It was lost in a take-off accident in 1931 and was the last Silesia aircraft to fly.

== Design and development ==
Three brothers, Edward, Paul and Wojciech Sopora set up an aircraft-building workshop in 1923 at Chorzów, calling it the Pierwsza Śląska Fabryka Samolotów (First Silesian Aircraft Factory). Their first product was the 1923 Silesia S-3. Though their next aircraft, the 1925 Silesia S-4, was also a low-powered, single seat monoplane like the S-3, It was a parasol wing type of more refined design.

The wing, with a rectangular plan and a thin aerofoil section, was a one piece, wooden structure built around two spars and fabric-covered. It was braced on each side with a parallel pair of struts to the spars from the lower fuselage longerons. An unusual pyramid of long struts on each side from the mid and lower fuselage braced the forward spar centrally and an inverted V-strut aft joined the upper fuselage longerons and rear spar. The wing had a large, deep cut-out in the central trailing edge which eased cockpit access, as the wing was not far above the fuselage.

The S-4 was at first powered by the same 22 kW (30 hp) air-cooled Haacke HFM-2 flat twin engine used by the S-3. Behind it the fuselage was rectangular in section and flat-sided. The forward part was a fabric-covered steel tube structure but behind the cockpit, just ahead of the trailing edge, wood frames and plywood covering were used. Its empennage was wood-framed, wire-braced and fabric-covered, with the tailplane on top of the fuselage and a fin with a short, balanced rudder. Its fixed, tailskid undercarriage was similar to that of the S-3, with large mainwheels on a single axle supported at each end by V-struts from the lower longerons.

The first flight, piloted by Klosek, was in June 1925. It was soon busy, giving a demonstration to representatives of an infantry regiment and taking part in a series of publicity flights to Silesian towns during a L.O.P.P air-awareness week. It also made a flight from Michajłowice to Świętochłowice.

It was later moved to Katowice, the home of the Silesian Pilots' Club where it was thoroughly tested by two Polskie Linie Lotnicze 'Lot' (Polish Airways 'Flight') pilots who found its handling poor and attributed this partly to the elderly, low-powered Haacke engine. These observations led to the installation of a slightly more powerful (26 kW (35 hp)) three cylinder Anzani engine. The wing bracing was tidied, with the original diagonal wire bracing of the main wing struts replaced by a rigid strut and the central, forward stuts replaced by a neater transverse V-strut from the upper longerons, making a more conventional cabane. The vertical tail was also modified, with a more rounded rudder with a smaller balance horn.

== Operational history ==
After these modifications the S-4 was much flown by members of the Silesian Pilots' Club and when in 1930 this club became part of the Silesian Aeroclub, the S-4 was one of the eight aircraft in its fleet. It was destroyed in June 1931 when a club member fatally stalled after an unauthorised take-off.

This crash had unhappy consequences for the Sopara brothers. Encouraged by the interest of the club fliers in the S-4, they had designed a 60 kW (80 hp), two seat, aerobatic training and touring aircraft, the Silesia S-10, the construction of which was funded by the Silesian Aeroclub. At the time of the S-4 crash the S-10 was complete but awaiting its German engine. The crash ended the club's interest in the S-10 and with it the Pierwsza Śląska Fabryka Samolotów; the S-4 was their last design to fly.

== Operators ==
- Silesian Pilots' Club
- Silesian Aeroclub

== Specifications (Haacke engine) ==
Data from Cynk (1971) except where noted

General characteristics

- Crew: One
- Length: 4.6 m (15 ft 1 in)
- Wingspan: 8.4 m (27 ft 7 in)
- Height: 1.85 m (6 ft 1 in)
- Wing area: 11 m^{2} (120 sq ft)
- Empty weight: 318 kg (701 lb)
- Gross weight: 415 kg (915 lb)
- Powerplant: 1 × Haacke HFM-2 air-cooled flat twin engine, 22 kW (30 hp)
- Propellers: 2-bladed

Performance

- Maximum speed: 120 km/h (75 mph, 65 kn) at sea level
- Cruise speed: 100 km/h (62 mph, 54 kn)
- Stall speed: 65 km/h (40 mph, 35 kn) minimum speed
- Range: 200 km (120 mi, 110 nmi)
- Take-off distance: 70 m (230 ft)
- Landing distance: 100 m (330 ft)
