= Dietrich-Gobiet DP.VII =

DP.VII

General information
- Type: Light sports aircraft
- National origin: Germany
- Manufacturer: Dietrich-Gobiet Flugzeugwerk

History
- First flight: Spring 1924

The Dietrich-Gobiet DP.VII was a simple, low power, German sports aircraft flown in early 1924.

== Design and development ==
The low-powered DP.VII was a simple, easily transportable, low-wing monoplane intended to make sports aviation more widely accessible. It had a simple, thick section wing, essentially rectangular in plan apart from blunted, angled tips. This had two main wooden box spars and was braced to the upper fuselage on each side with an inverted V-form pair of struts from the upper fuselage longerons to the spars at about one-third span. Unusually, the one-piece wing structure passed through the deep fuselage above the lower longerons and could be extracted in a few minutes then transported away on a pair of trestles normally stowed inside the DP.VII. The aircraft had long-span ailerons filling about two-thirds of the wing.

The simple, flat-sided fuselage was a steel-tube structure with four longerons, linked by welded struts, defining the shape. Internal piano wire bracing stiffened the fuselage, which was fabric-covered. The open cockpit was over the rear wing and was large enough for a passenger to sit behind the pilot, straddling a box seat. Though the power was low, the structure was light and the load/empty weight ratio (0.89) was noted as high. At the time, the installation of the 22 kW (30 hp) air-cooled Haacke HFM-2 engine was seen as particularly clean, with only the upper cylinders projecting out of the cowling.

The DP.VII's mainwheels were mounted on a single axle, conventionally rubber sprung to a cross member attached to the lower fuselage longerons by a V-form pair of struts on each side. Less conventionally, the undercarriage structure was braced by another, transverse, V-strut from the cross piece centre to the longerons. There was a sprung tail skid at the rear.

The exact date of the DP.VII's first flight is not certain, but the prototype had been well tested by late May 1924 and there were plans to put it into quantity production. At almost the same time, Dietrich-Gobiet were developing the DP.VIIA which, despite the similar designation, was a larger-span, parasol-wing monoplane. It had a similar fuselage and empennage to the DP.VII but a much more powerful engine, a Siemens-Halske Sh 4 five-cylinder radial producing about 41 kW (55 hp). This aircraft was on display at the Third International Aero Show at Prague in early June 1924. Few of either type seem to have been produced.

== Variants ==
DP.VII
Low-wing monoplane, powered by a 22 kW (30 hp) Haacke HFM 2 flat-twin engine.
DP.VIIA
Parasol-wing monoplane, powered by a 43 kW (58 hp) Siemens-Halske Sh 4 radial engine, with 20% greater span and 50% heavier loaded weight. Based on the Stahlwerk Mark R.III.

== Specifications (DP.VII) ==
Data from Flight, 22 May 1924 p.287.

General characteristics

- Crew: One
- Capacity: one passenger
- Length: 5.4 m (17 ft 9 in)
- Wingspan: 8.0 m (26 ft 3 in)
- Height: 1.95 m (6 ft 5 in)
- Wing area: 10.63 m^{2} (114.4 sq ft)
- Empty weight: 180 kg (397 lb)
- Gross weight: 340 kg (750 lb)
- Powerplant: 1 × Haacke HFM-2 flat-twin engine, air-cooled, 22 kW (30 hp) 30-35 hp
- Propellers: 2-bladed

Performance

- Maximum speed: 115 km/h (71 mph, 62 kn)
- Range: 350 km (220 mi, 190 nmi)
- Service ceiling: 2,500 m (8,200 ft)
