= Udet U 5 =

Touring aircraft built in Germany in the early 1920s

U 5

General information
- Type: Touring aircraft
- National origin: Germany
- Manufacturer: Udet Flugzeugbau
- Designer: Hans Henry Herrmann
- Number built: 1

History
- First flight: 1923
- Developed into: Udet U 8

The Udet U 5 was a touring aircraft developed in Germany in the early 1920s. It was found to be underpowered for its intended role, and only a single example was built. However, its design served as the basis for the more successful Udet U 8.

== Design ==
The U 5 was a parasol-wing, cantilever monoplane of conventional configuration. It had a conventional tail, and fixed, tailskid undercarriage. The pilot sat in an open cockpit, and an enclosed cabin could seat two passengers. Power was provided by a radial engine in the nose, driving a two-bladed propeller.

Construction was wooden throughout. The fuselage was built of moulded plywood in an oval cross-section. The wings had an almost elliptical planform and were mounted to the top of the fuselage on very short struts. Unlike previous Udet designs that had a very angular fin, the U 5 had a fun with a curved leading edge, resembling the fins of Albatros aircraft of World War I.

== Development ==
Construction of the U 5 was completed in July 1923, and it received the registration D.302. Udet Flugzeugbau hoped to present it at the 1923 aeronautical exhibition in Gothenburg in August, but it was not ready in time.

Apart from the overall lack of power, testing revealed that the aerodynamic fairings fitted to the cylinders of the radial engine made it prone to overheating, and these were removed.

== Specifications ==
Data from Birchal 2013, p.45

General characteristics

- Crew: 1 pilot
- Capacity: 2 passengers
- Length: 7.28 m (23 ft 11 in)
- Wingspan: 12.0 m (39 ft 4 in)
- Height: 2.46 m (8 ft 1 in)
- Wing area: 18 m^{2} (190 sq ft)
- Empty weight: 470 kg (1,036 lb)
- Gross weight: 800 kg (1,764 lb)
- Powerplant: 1 × Siemens-Halske Sh 5 seven-cylinder, radial, air-cooled piston engine, 57 kW (76 hp) (77 PS)

Performance

- Maximum speed: 170 km/h (110 mph, 92 kn)

== Notes ==
=== Bibliography ===
- Bichel, Olaf (2013). Die Flugzeuge der Udet Flugzeugbau GmbH [The aeroplanes of the Udet Flugzeugbau company] (in German). Oberschleißheim: Bayerische Flugzeug-Historiker eV.
- The Illustrated Encyclopedia of Aircraft. Vol. 13. London: Aerospace Publishing. 1984.
- Taylor, Michael J. H. (1993). Jane's Encyclopedia of Aviation. London: Studio Editions.
