= Focke-Wulf S 24 Kiebitz =

S 24 Kiebitz
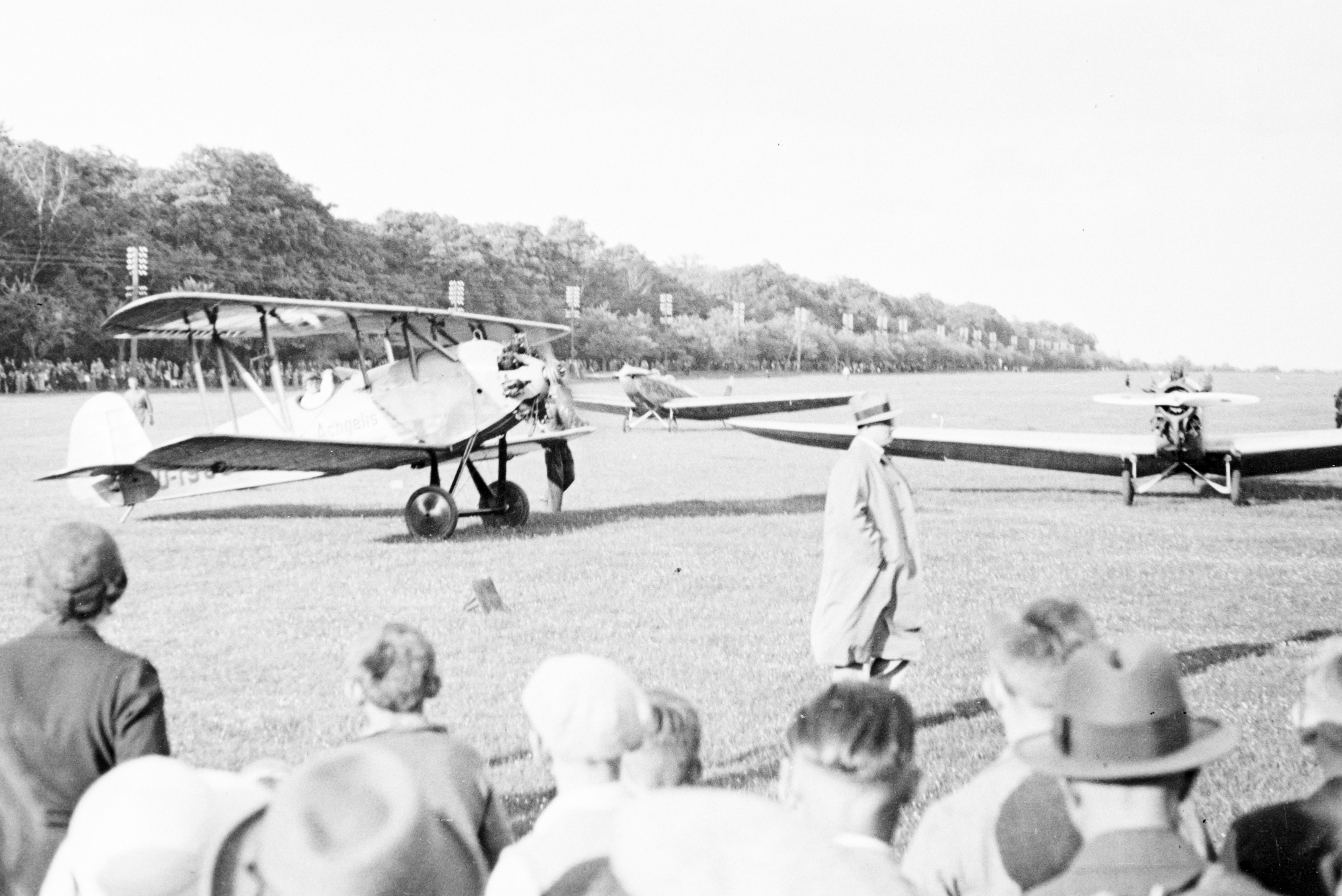
- S 24 left, Daimler L.20 right

General information
- Type: Sport aircraft
- Manufacturer: Focke-Wulf

History
- First flight: 1928

The Focke-Wulf S 24 Kiebitz (German: "Lapwing") was a sport aircraft built in Germany in the later 1920s. It was a single-bay biplane of conventional design with equal-span, unstaggered wings, braced with N-type interplane struts. The pilot and a single passenger sat in tandem open cockpits, and it was fitted with a fixed tailskid undercarriage. The wings could be folded for transportation or storage, and the aircraft was designed to be towed by a car.

In 1929, the S 24 set a world distance record in its class of 1,601 km (995 mi) and in 1931 was used by Gerd Achgelis to win the German aerobatic championship.

== Specifications (S 24) ==
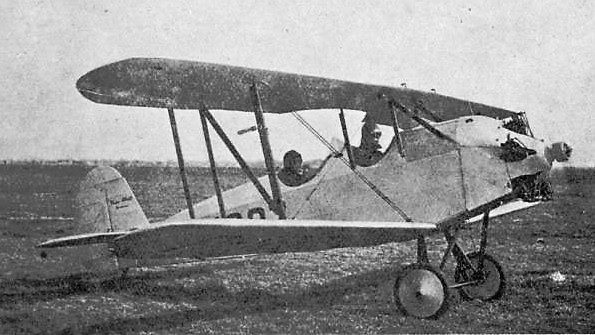
Focke-Wulf S 24 photo from Annuaire de L'Aéronautique 1931

Data from Jane's all the World's Aircraft 1928

General characteristics

- Crew: 2
- Length: 6.25 m (20 ft 6 in)
- Wingspan: 8.9 m (29 ft 2 in)
- Height: 2.25 m (7 ft 5 in)
- Wing area: 19.5 m^{2} (210 sq ft)
- Empty weight: 350 kg (772 lb)
- Gross weight: 570 kg (1,257 lb)
- Powerplant: 1 × Siemens-Halske Sh 4 5-cylinder air-cooled radial piston engine, 45 kW (60 hp)
- Propellers: 2-bladed fixed pitch propeller

Performance

- Maximum speed: 140 km/h (87 mph, 76 kn)
- Landing speed: 65 km/h (40 mph; 35 kn)
- Service ceiling: 4,300 m (14,100 ft)
- Rate of climb: 21.1 m/s (4,150 ft/min)
- Time to altitude: 1,000 m (3,300 ft) in 7 minutes
