= Lectionary 68 =

Lectionary ℓ 68
- New Testament manuscript
- Text: Evangelistarion †
- Date: 12th-century
- Script: Greek
- Now at: Bibliothèque nationale de France
- Size: 32.5 cm by 24.5 cm
- Hand: fine

Lectionary 68, designated by siglum ℓ 68 (in the Gregory-Aland numbering), is a Greek manuscript of the New Testament, on vellum leaves. Palaeographically it has been assigned to the 12th-century (or 11th-century).

== Description ==
The codex contains Lessons from the Gospels of John, Matthew, Luke lectionary (Evangelistarium) with some lacunae. It is written in Greek minuscule letters, on 357 parchment leaves (32.5 cm by 24.5 cm), 1 column per page, 23 lines per page. Some leaves in disorder.

== History ==
The manuscript once belonged to Colbert. It was examined by Scholz. It was examined and described by Paulin Martin. C. R. Gregory saw it in 1885.

The manuscript is sporadically cited in the critical editions of the Greek New Testament (UBS3).

Currently the codex is located in the Bibliothèque nationale de France (Gr. 285) in Paris.

== See also ==
- List of New Testament lectionaries
- Biblical manuscript
- Textual criticism
