= Haacke HFM-2 =

German aircraft engine from the 1920s

HFM-2
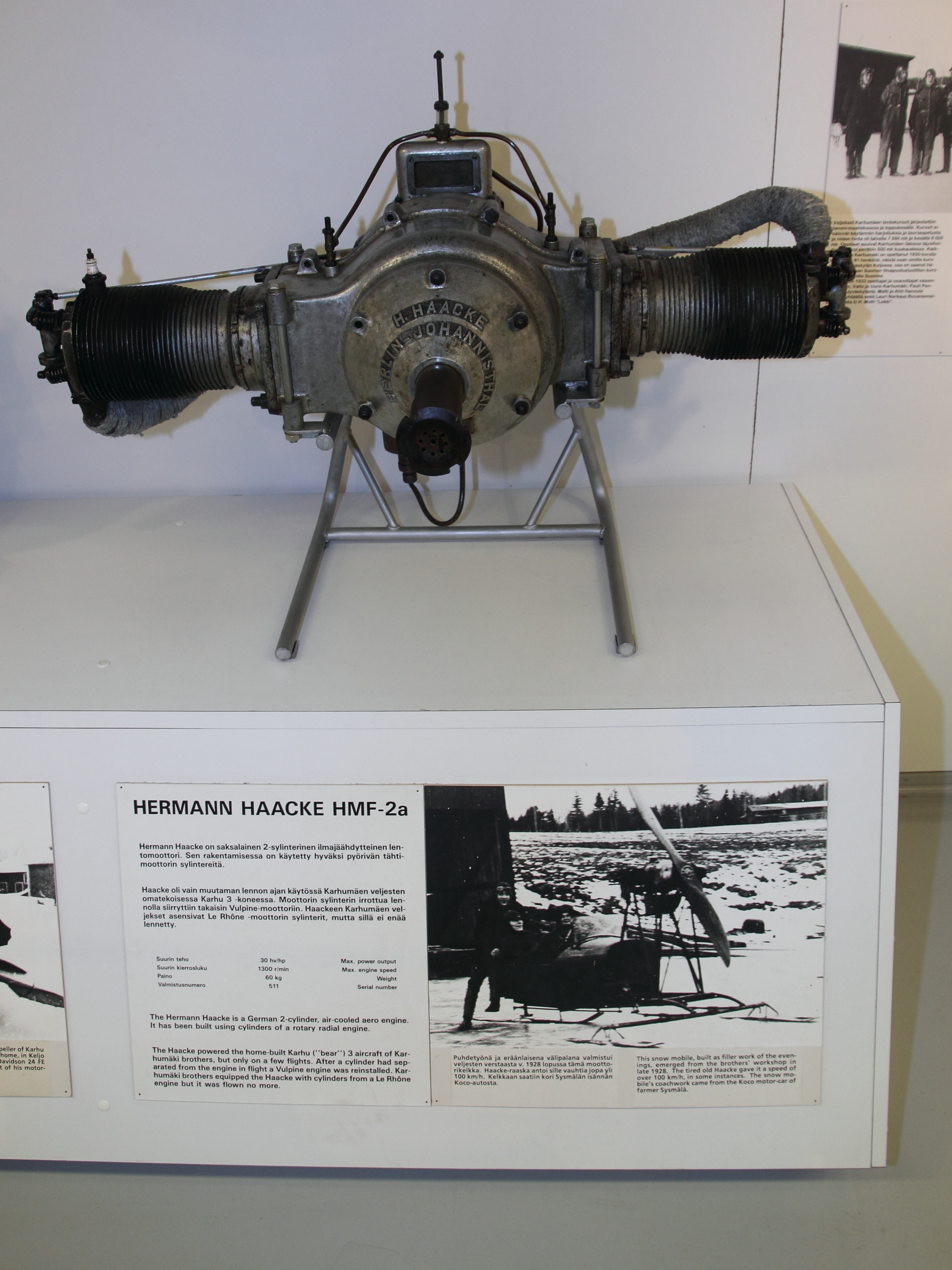
- HFM-2a on display at the Finnish Airforce Museum
- Type: Flat-twin aero engine
- National origin: Germany
- Manufacturer: Haacke Motorenbau, Johannisthal (Berlin)

The Haacke HFM-2 is a German two cylinder flat engine built in the early 1920s.

== Variants ==
From Flight

- HFM-2 (22 kW (30 hp))
- HFM-2a (22–26 kW (30–35 hp)); as HFM-2 apart from 120 mm (4.72 in) bore

== Applications ==
- Albatros L.66
- Dietrich-Gobiet DP.VII
- Działowski D.K.D.1
- Dobi-I
- Gabriel P 5
- Karhu 3
- Mayenberger amphibian
- Rieseler R.I
- Rieseler R.II
- Rieseler R.III
- Silesia S-3
- Silesia S-4
- Udet U.1
- Udet U.2

== Engines on display ==
- Finnish Airforce Museum

== Specifications (HFM-2) ==
Data from Flight

=== General characteristics ===
- Type: Four-stroke horizontally opposed twin cylinder
- Bore: 112 mm (4.4 in)
- Stroke: 140 mm (5.5 in)
- Dry weight: 60 kg (132 lb)

=== Components ===
- Valvetrain: Overhead valve
- Oil system: Camshaft-operated twin plunger pumps
- Cooling system: Air-cooled

=== Performance ===
- Power output: 22 kW (30 hp) at 1,300 rpm

== See also ==
Comparable engines

- ABC Scorpion

Related lists

- List of aircraft engines
