= Albatros L 68 =

L 68 Alauda
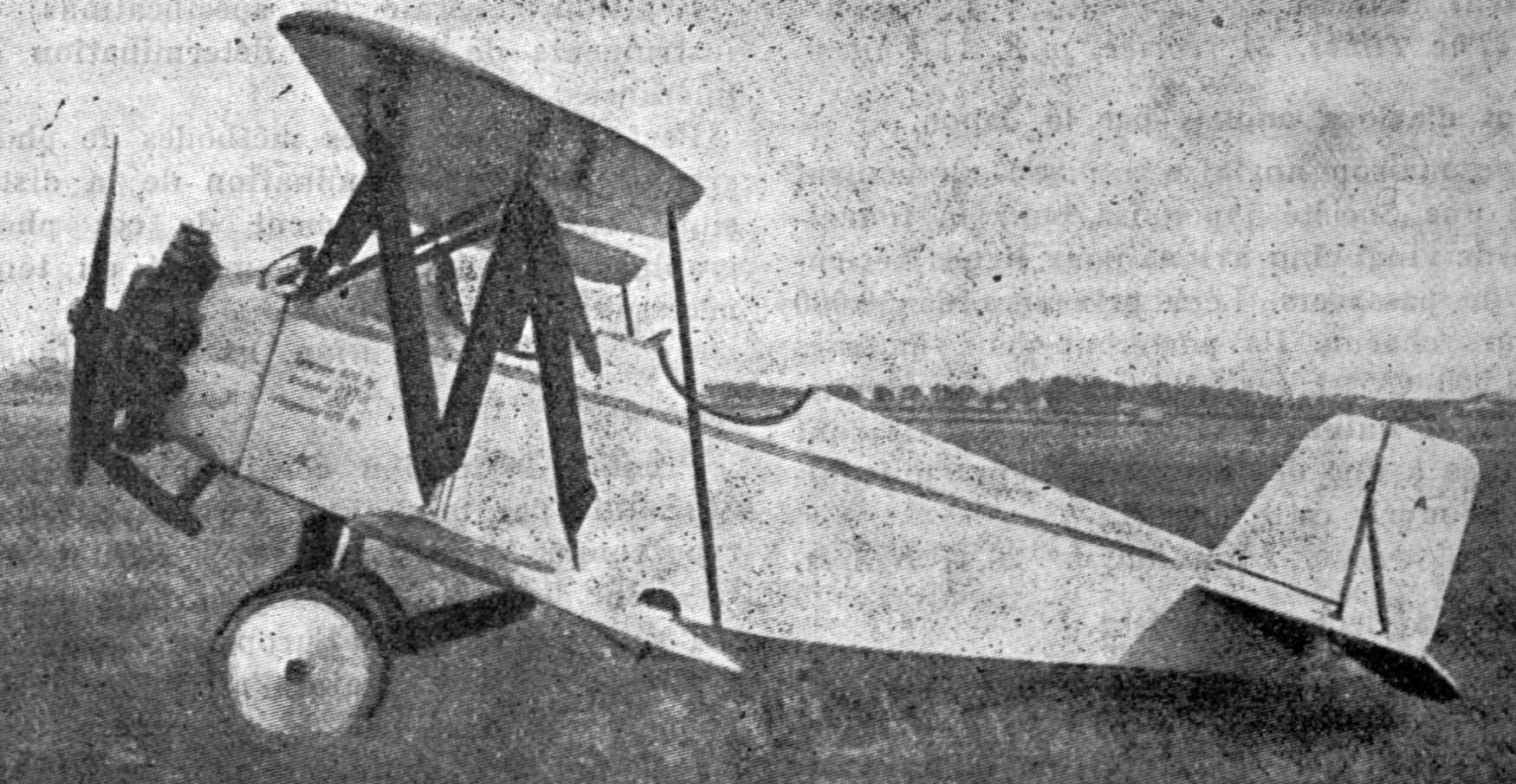
- L 68a

General information
- Type: Trainer
- Manufacturer: Albatros Flugzeugwerke
- Number built: 18

The Albatros L 68 Alauda was a two-seat German trainer aircraft of the 1920s. It was a single-engine biplane of conventional configuration that seated the pilot and instructor in tandem, open cockpits. The wings were of unequal span and had a pronounced stagger.

== Variants ==
- L 68 - original production version with Siemens-Halske Sh 11 engine (3 built)
- L 68a - longer wingspan and Sh 12 engine (3 built)
- L 68c - main production version based on L 68a (10 built)
- L 68d - Siemens-Halske Sh.III engine (1 built)
- L 68e - Armstrong Siddeley Lynx engine (1 built)

== Specifications (L 68c) ==
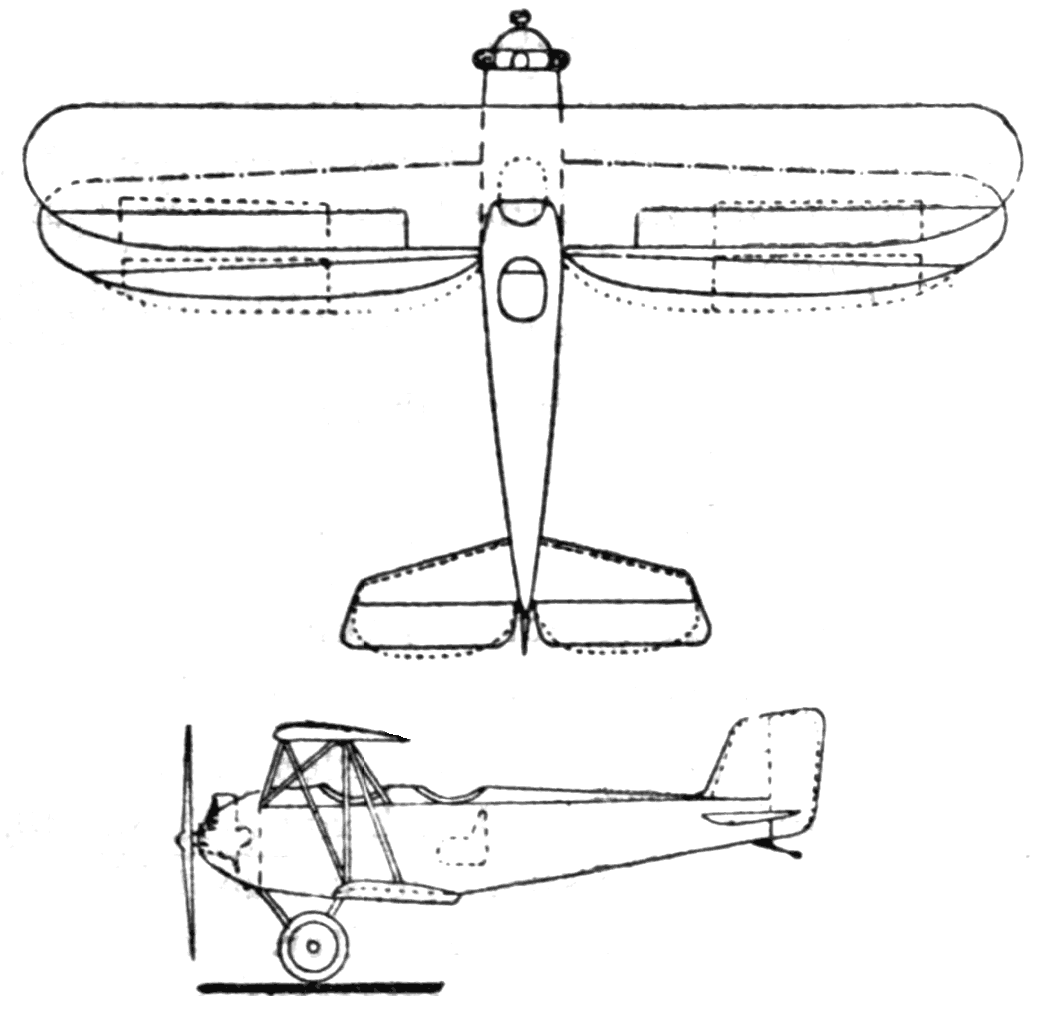
Albatros L.68 2-view drawing from Le Document aéronautique June,1927

General characteristics

- Crew: two, pilot and instructor
- Length: 6.30 m (20 ft 8 in)
- Wingspan: 10.10 m (33 ft 2 in)
- Height: 2.56 m (8 ft 5 in)
- Wing area: 24.4 m^{2} (263 sq ft)
- Empty weight: 650 kg (1,430 lb)
- Gross weight: 950 kg (2,090 lb)
- Powerplant: 1 × Siemens-Halske Sh 12 , 80 kW (110 hp)

Performance

- Maximum speed: 140 km/h (90 mph, 78 kn)
- Range: 360 km (220 mi, 190 nmi)
- Service ceiling: 4,200 m (13,800 ft)
- Rate of climb: 1.4 m/s (270 ft/min)
