= Jurgis Dobkevičius =

Lithuanian aviator and aircraft designer

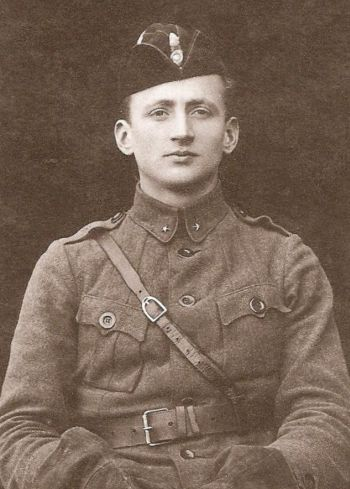
- Born: 23 March 1900; Saint Petersburg, Russian Empire
- Died: 8 June 1926 (aged 26); Kaunas, Lithuania
- Cause of death: Airplane crash
- Education: Ecole Supérieure d'Aéronautique
- Occupations: Aviator, aircraft designer
- Father: Jonas Dobkevičius
- Awards: Order of the Cross of Vytis

Jurgis Dobkevičius (23 March 1900 – 8 June 1926) was a pioneering aviator and aircraft designer in interwar Lithuania.

Educated in Russia, Dobkevičius joined the Lithuanian Army in 1919. During the Polish–Lithuanian War and the Żeligowski's Mutiny in July–November 1920, Dobkevičius flew 21 missions. After about 400 flight hours, he retired from active military service in 1923 in order to study at the Ecole Supérieure d'Aéronautique in Paris.

Dobkevičius designed, built, and tested three monoplanes: sports aircraft Dobi-I (August 1922), military surveillance aircraft Dobi-II (October 1923), and fighter Dobi-III (November 1924). Dobkevičius' designs were noted for their speed and aerodynamics. However, the designs sacrificed pilot's visibility, particularly when looking down to land. This led to several Dobi crashes when landing. Dobkevičius died in the crash of Dobi-III during its second test flight in June 1926.

== Biography ==
=== Early life and education ===
Dobkevičius was born on 23 March 1900 in Saint Petersburg where his father Jonas Dobkevičius worked in the administrative offices of the Tsar's palace. During World War I, Jonas Dobkevičius was the director of a French company producing cars and airplanes in Russia. Later, in 1922, he became the Minister of Finance of independent Lithuania. Dobkevičius' family hailed from wealthy Lithuanian peasants near Svėdasai (their original Lithuanian surname was Daukus). His mother was Valentina Teplyakova from Russian nobility near Tver. As a result, Jurgis Dobkevičius grew up in Eastern Orthodox faith and did not speak Lithuanian until joining the Lithuanian military in 1919.

Jurgis Dobkevičius completed a commercial school in Vyborg with a gold medal. In 1917, he enrolled at the Petrograd Polytechnic Institute where he studied shipbuilding and aviation. His education was interrupted by war and the Russian Revolution. He was mobilized into the Russian Army and sent to the Baku Naval Aviation Officer School where he gained first flying experience with seaplanes.

=== Military service ===
In 1919, Dobkevičius' family returned to Lithuania. In August 1919, he voluntarily joined the Lithuanian Army and attended its newly established military aviation school (see: War School of Kaunas). There he trained with Albatros B.II. The class of 34 aviators graduated on 16 December 1919. Upon graduation, Dobkevičius was promoted to engineer lieutenant.

During the Polish–Lithuanian War and the Żeligowski's Mutiny in July–November 1920, Dobkevičius flew 21 missions: 16 reconnaissance, three bombing, and two destruction. For flying a mission to bomb Polish positions near Suwałki and Augustów and returning with six bullet holes in his craft on 3 September, Dobkevičius was recommended for a promotion and was awarded the Order of the Cross of Vytis (1st class). He became the commander of the 1st Air Squadron on 22 September 1920.

In November 1920, Dobkevičius set the first Lithuanian record for altitude at 5,600 metres (18,400 ft). The next month, when flying a Fokker D.VII, he was the first in Lithuania to perform a loop. He was reprimanded for this maneuver and it delayed his recognition as the first official military pilot of Lithuania until February 1921. He was severely injured in April 1921 when flying a Halberstadt CL.IV and spent a month recuperating in a military hospital. He was promoted to senior lieutenant in April 1923 and awarded Order of the Cross of Vytis (2nd class) in July 1923. In total, during his military career, Dobkevičius flew about 600 times and 400 hours.

He retired from active military service in November 1923 in order to study at the Ecole Superieure d'Aeronautique in Paris from which he graduated in July 1925.

=== Aircraft designer ===
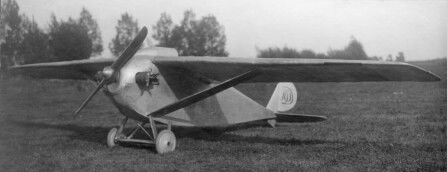
Dobi-I

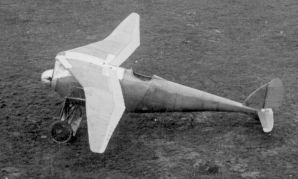
Dobi-III

In 1921, Dobkevičius began designing and building his own aircraft at the Aleksotas Airport. He financed this endeavor from his own funds. He tested his first design, Dobi-I, in August 1922. It was a single-seat sports monoplane which reached a maximum speed of 175 kilometres per hour (109 mph). Dobkevičius attempted to fly to Saint Petersburg in Dobi-I but it malfunctioned near Zarasai. In December 1925, Dobkevičius hit a hay wagon at the edge of the airfield. Dobi-I was totaled and Dobkevičius broke a leg.

Dobkevičius built Dobi-II with government funding at the newly established aviation workshop in Freda. It was a two-seat aircraft meant for military surveillance. Dobkevičius conducted its first test flight on 13 October 1923. It reached a maximum speed of 250 kilometres per hour (160 mph).

While studying in Paris, Dobkevičius designed Dobi-III, a fighter aircraft. It was first tested in November 1924. When landing, both wings broke. Dobkevičius' designs were noted for their speed and aerodynamics. However, the designs sacrificed pilot's visibility, particularly when looking down to land. This led to several Dobi crashes when landing, including the fatal crash on 8 June 1926. When Dobkevičius returned from Paris in 1925, he worked to repair and improve Dobi-III. Before returning to France where he was offered a job at Bréguet Aviation, Dobkevičius flew Dobi-III for the second time. Due to winds, Dobi-III crashed into oak trees near the Aleksotas Airport killing Dobkevičius.

He was buried at the Kaunas City Old Cemetery. When this cemetery was demolished and turned into a city park, Dobkevičius' remains were reinterred at the Panemunė Cemetery.

== Legacy ==
Dobkevičius is remembered as a pioneering aviator in Lithuania. A street in Kaunas was named after him in 1934. This street was renamed by the Soviet authorities in 1946. When Lithuania regained independence in 1990, a street in Aleksotas was named in his honor and a memorial stone was unveiled at the crash site. In 1993, a secondary school located near the crash site was named after him.
