= Siemens-Halske Sh 4 =

Type of engine

Sh 4
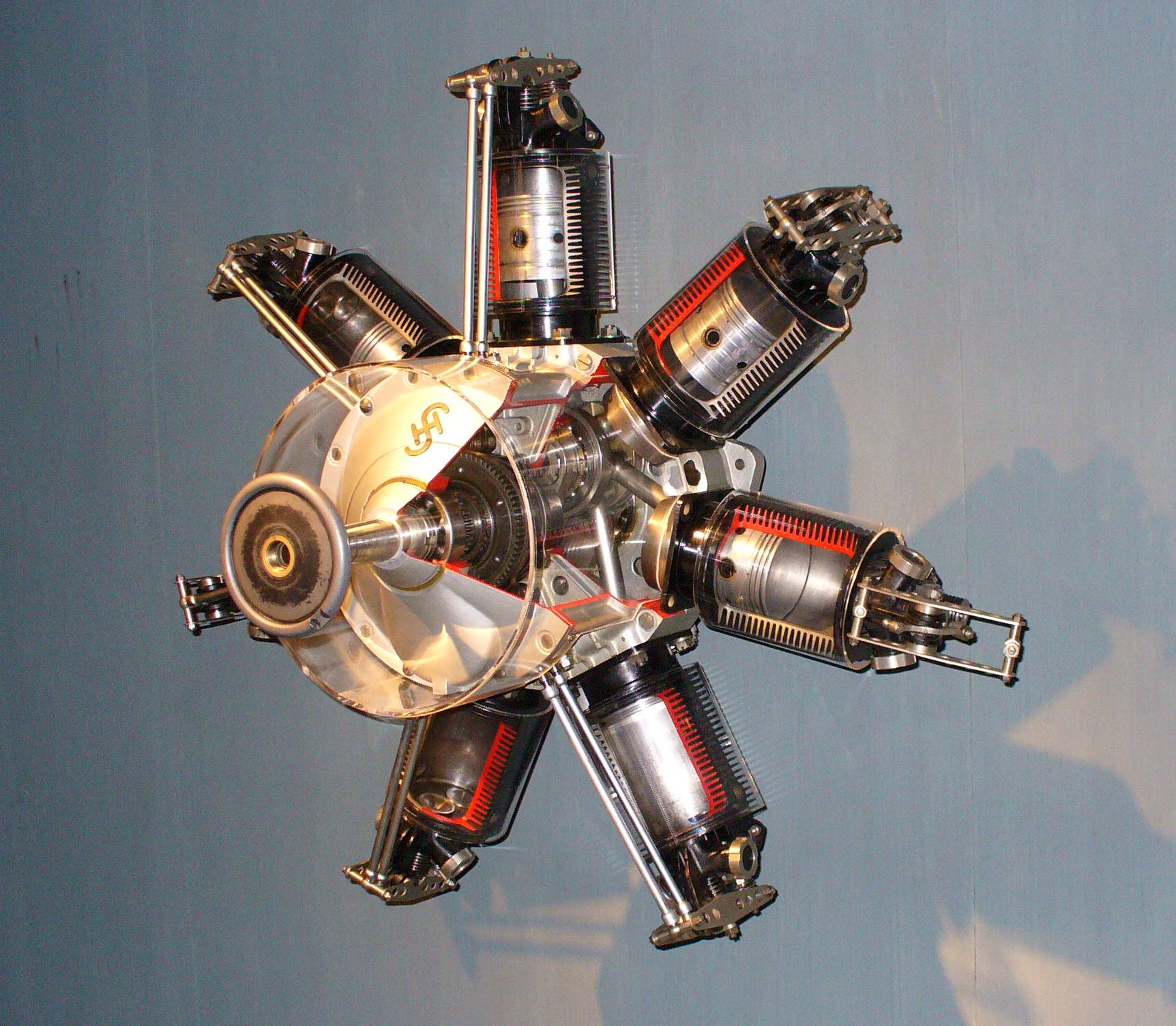
- Type: Radial engine
- Manufacturer: Siemens-Halske
- First run: 1921

The Siemens-Halske Sh 4 was a five-cylinder, air-cooled, radial engine for aircraft built in Germany in the 1920s. First run in 1921, it was rated at 40 kW (55 hp).

== Applications ==
- Albatros L 59
- Albatros L 71
- Caspar U.1
- Dietrich-Gobiet DP.VIIA
- Dornier Libelle
- Działowski D.K.D.4bis
- Junkers K 16
- Udet U 3
- Udet U 6
- Focke-Wulf S 24
- Dietrich DP.II (one aircraft only)

== See also ==
Related lists

- List of aircraft engines
