= Udet Flugzeugbau =

Aircraft manufacturer

- Industry: Aircraft manufacture
- Founded: 1921
- Founder: Ernst Udet
- Defunct: August 24, 1926
- Fate: Liquidated
- Successor: Bayerische Flugzeugwerke
- Headquarters: Munich, Germany

Udet Flugzeugbau GmbH was an aircraft manufacturer founded in the summer of 1921 in Munich by Ernst Udet with Henry Hans Herrmann and Erich Scheuermann, funded by the American financier William Pohl, designing and building light sport and commercial aircraft, within the limitations of the Versailles Treaty.

== History ==
The first Udet aircraft to be built was the single-seater Udet U 1 designed by Hans Henry Herrmann in the winter of 1921/22 with a 22 kW two-cylinder Haacke HFM-2 engine. Although the fuselage was designed with two seats, only one seat was installed due to the low-powered engine. The first flight took place in May 1922. The refined U 2, which was ready for series production in the winter of 1922, had been designed with two seats. It had a wingspan of 8.9 m, was about 6 m long and was driven by the same Haacke engine as the U 1. At least four machines of this type were built. On January 1, 1923 Herrmann then officially became chief designer at Udet in Ramersdorf.

The U 4 retained the design features of the U 2 but was now equipped with a 40 kW Siemens-Halske Sh 4 radial engine. The U 6 and U 10 were further refined designs. Developed in the summer of 1923 the U 6 had the same dimensions as the U 4, but was equipped with a 62 kW Siemens-Halske Sh 5 engine, a roll bar over the front seat and an aerodynamically rounded fin .

With the following U 10, some competition successes were achieved. This type was again equipped with the Sh 4 engine, but had the wingspan increased to 10.5 m. A U 10a was also tested with light metal floats. A total of 10 aircraft of this type were sold.

The high-wing U 5 proved to have poor performance, but the larger and stronger U 8 was used in some copies in the regular service. The U 8b variant was the first aircraft in Germany to be equipped with slats. The ultralight U 7 Kolibri (hummingbird) used a half-litre capacity Douglas engine, had a 10 m wingspan and weighed only 250 kg. The type was known for its success on the Wasserkuppe in 1924. Nevertheless, only two U 7s were built.

However, the best-known Udet type was the U 12 "Flamingo", which first flew on 7 April 1925 and was built not only in Germany, but also in Austria, Hungary and the Baltic States.

The largest aircraft type was the four-engine U 11 "Kondor" with a fuselage in metal construction, the wings, however, were made of wood. The company entered new technological territory with the U 11 as only Junkers, Dornier and Rohrbach were building metal aircraft in Germany at the time.

The failure of the "Kondor" was one of the reasons that the company ran into financial difficulties. A last type was designed for the maritime competition in 1926, the U 13 floatplane. The design suffered problems from the start and turned out to be completely unfit. Ernst Udet left in 1925, he was followed at the end of February 1926 by Erich Scheuermann, whereupon Hans Herrmann temporarily took over the company. On 24 August 1926, the company was finally liquidated and the remaining assets were taken over by the government.

In July 1927, nine Udet airplanes were sold to the forces of Chinese warlord Zhang Zongchang during the Northern Expedition.

The remains of Udet Flugzeugbau GmbH were merged with Bayerische Flugzeugwerke (BFW) which later became Messerschmitt. A new factory was built in Augsburg which continued to build the U 12 in several versions as the BFW U 12 .

== Udet aircraft ==
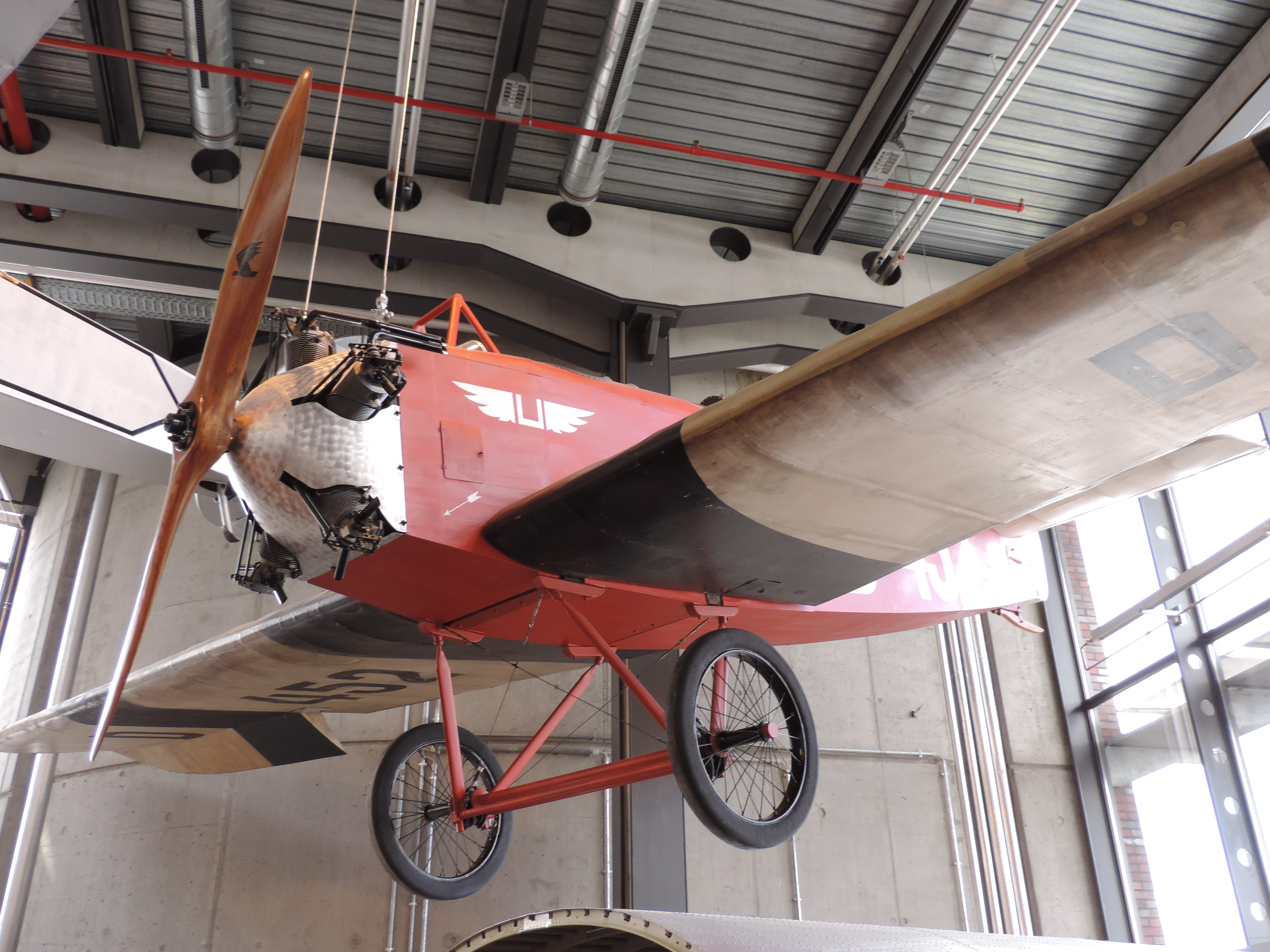
Udet U 10 on display at the Technikmuseum Berlin

- U 1
- U 2
- U 3
- U 4
- U 5
- U 6
- U 7 Kolibiri
- U 8
- U 10
- U 11 Kondor
- U 12 Flamingo
- U 13 Bayern

== See also ==
- List of aircraft manufacturers
