= Schleißheim =

- Municipality
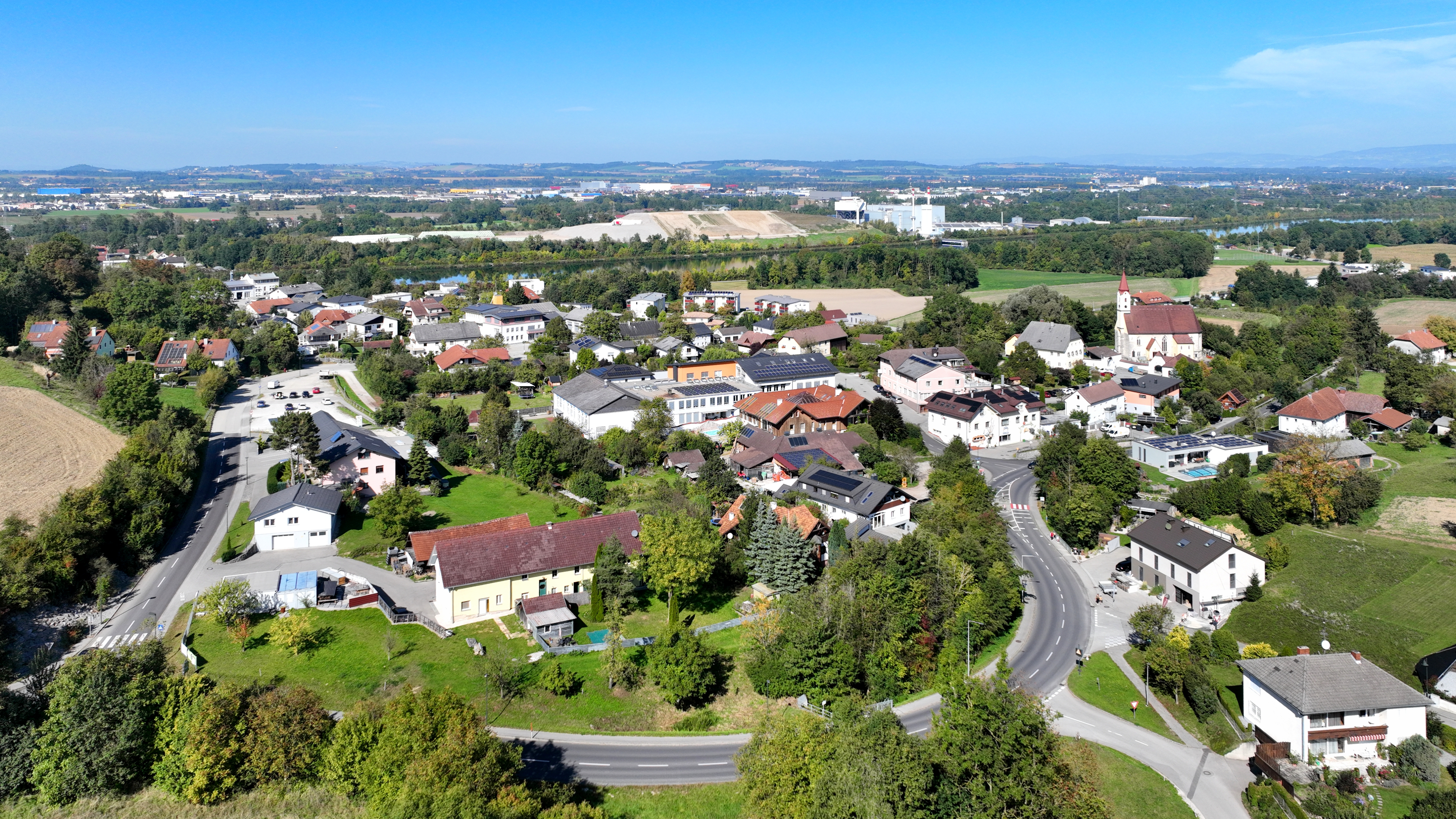
- South view of Schleißheim

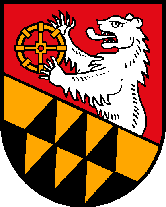
- Coat of arms

- Location within Austria
- Coordinates: 48°09′39″N 14°05′36″E
- Country: Austria
- State: Upper Austria
- District: Wels-Land

Government
  - Mayor: Manfred Zauner (ÖVP)

Area
  - Total: 7.59 km^{2} (2.93 sq mi)
- Elevation: 317 m (1,040 ft)

Population (2018-01-01)
  - Total: 1,389
  - Density: 183/km^{2} (474/sq mi)
- Time zone: UTC+1 (CET)
  - Summer (DST): UTC+2 (CEST)
- Postal code: 4600
- Area code: 0 72 42
- Vehicle registration: WL
- Website: www.schleissheim.at

Schleißheim is a municipality in the district Wels-Land in the Austrian state of Upper Austria.

== Population ==
Historical population
Year	Pop.	±%
1869	568	—
1880	565	−0.5%
1890	566	+0.2%
1900	532	−6.0%
1910	538	+1.1%
1923	568	+5.6%
1934	644	+13.4%
1939	613	−4.8%
1951	711	+16.0%
1961	590	−17.0%
1971	611	+3.6%
1981	749	+22.6%
1991	845	+12.8%
2001	938	+11.0%
2011	1,233	+31.4%
