= Udet U 1 =

German low-powered monoplane built in the 1920s

U 1

General information
- Type: Low power sport aircraft
- National origin: Germany
- Manufacturer: Udet Flugzeugbau
- Designer: Hans Henry Herrmann
- Number built: 1

History
- First flight: 16 May 1922

The Udet U 1 was the first of a line of small, low-powered, low wing, cantilever monoplanes built in Germany in the early 1920s.

== Design ==
The design was a low wing, cantilever monoplane in an era dominated by biplanes. The U 1 was a single-seater, as the air-cooled, 22 kW (30 hp) Haacke HFM-2 flat-twin did not have enough power for more than one person.

Behind the engine in its aluminium cowling the fuselage was structurally rectangular in section apart from raised upper decking and was ply-covered. Pilot and passenger sat in tandem in a single, open cockpit, with the pilot in front and over the centre of the wing. It had a conventional, rather angular tail, with a fin of greater area than the rudder, though this reached down to the keel; the tailplane, mounted on top of the fuselage, was also large compared with the elevators.

== Development ==
In the summer of 1921, a new aviation company was formed using the WWI German flying ace Ernst Udet's name. William Pohl from Milwaukee, Hans Henry Herrmann and Erich Scheuermann joined the company to fund the aircraft before postwar treaty restrictions were lifted on aircraft production, with the intent of building an inexpensive aircraft for the American market. The builders produced and flew the U 1 five months before the formation of the Udet Flugzeubau GmbH company.

== Specifications ==
Data from Olaf Bichel. Die Flugzeuge der Udet Flugzeugbau GmbH. p. 29.

General characteristics

- Crew: 1 pilot
- Length: 5.53 m (18 ft 2 in)
- Wingspan: 8.9 m (29 ft 2 in)
- Height: 1.9 m (6 ft 3 in)
- Empty weight: 200 kg (441 lb)
- Gross weight: 300 kg (661 lb)
- Powerplant: 1 × Haacke HFM2 two-cylinder, horizontally-opposed, air-cooled piston engine, 22 kW (30 hp) (30 PS)

Performance

- Maximum speed: 180 km/h (110 mph, 97 kn)

== Notes ==
=== Bibliography ===
- The Illustrated Encyclopedia of Aircraft. London: Aerospace Publishing.
- Taylor, Michael J. H. (1993). Jane's Encyclopedia of Aviation. London: Studio Editions.
- World Aircraft Information Files. London: Bright Star Publishing.
