= List of United States electronic warfare aircraft =

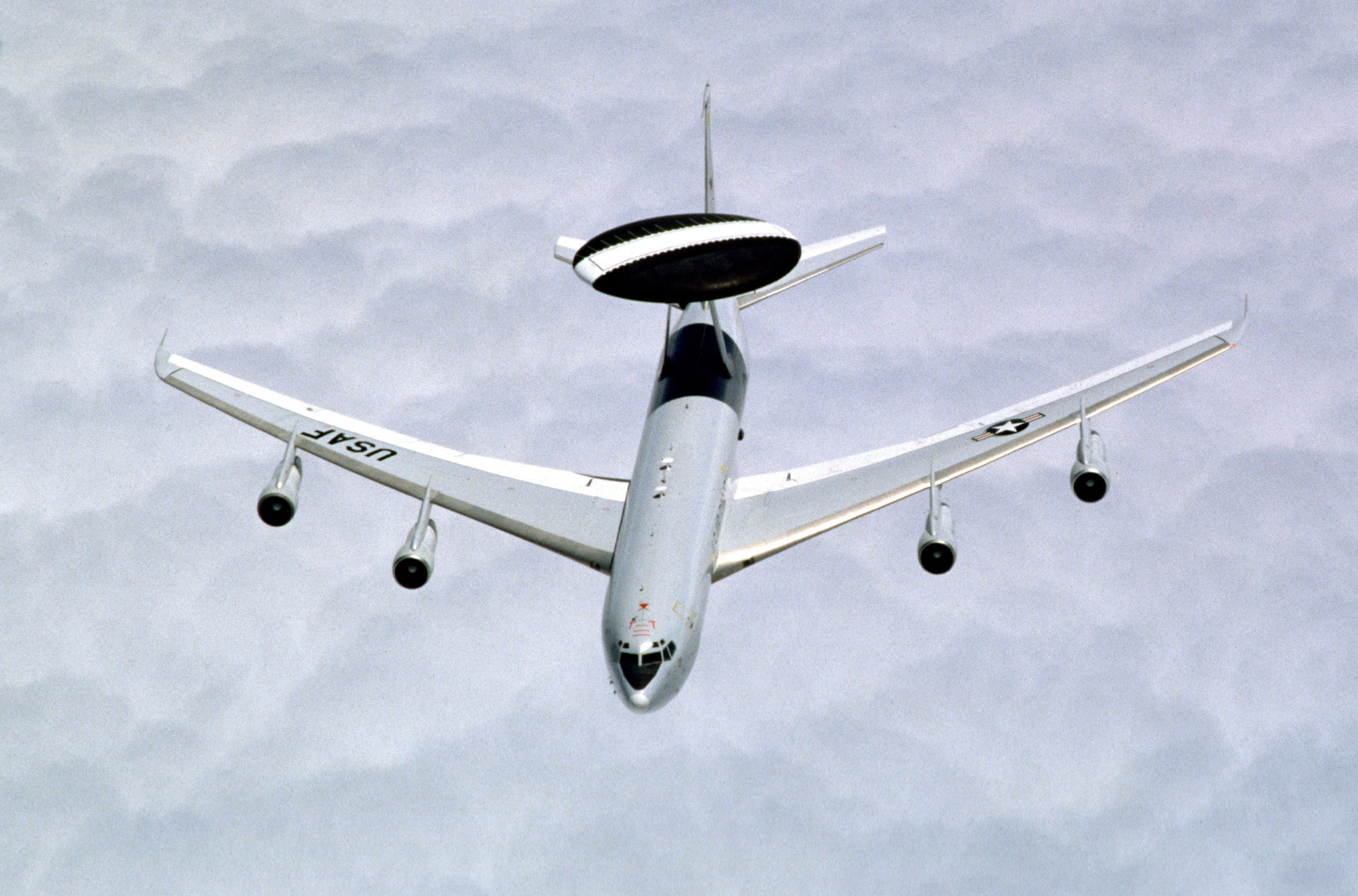
A Boeing E-3 Sentry.

This list covers both currently and formerly operated electromagnetic warfare aircraft (typically airborne early warning and control aircraft) used by the United States.

As such there will be overlaps with United States command and control aircraft and United States airborne early warning aircraft.

== 1939–1962 ==
Name	Role	Manufacturer	Notes	Year of first flight	Introduction	Number built	Image
Douglas EF-10B Skyknight/F3D-2Q	Attack / electronic warfare	Douglas Aircraft Company	Electronic warfare version of the Douglas F3D Skyknight. 35 F3D-2s were converted into F3D-2Q EW aircraft.	Unknown	Unknown	At least 35	
Lockheed EC-121 Warning Star	Airborne early warning and control	Lockheed Corporation	Developed from the Lockheed C-121 Constellation	1949	1954	232	
Douglas EA-1 Skyraider	Attack / electronic countermeasures	Douglas Aircraft Company	Variants of the Douglas A-1 Skyraider with electronic countermeasures.				
Douglas EA-3B Skywarrior	Strategic bomber / electronic warfare	Douglas Aircraft Company	Electronic warfare version of the Douglas A-3 Skywarrior.	1952	1956		
Grumman E-1 Tracer	Carrier-based airborne early warning	Grumman	Developed from the Grumman C-1 Trader. Replaced by the E-2 Hawkeyes in 1964.	1956	1960	88	
Northrop Grumman E-2 Hawkeye	Carrier-based airborne early warning	Northrop Grumman	Highly used by the United States Navy; developed into the Grumman C-2 Greyhound. Replaced the E-1 Tracer.	1960	1964	313 (total); 88 (E-2D)	

== 1962–present ==
Name	Role	Manufacturer	Notes	Year of first flight	Introduction	Number built	Image
Douglas EB-66	Electronic warfare	Douglas Aircraft Company	Used by United States Air Force to jam North Vietnamese SAMs, MiG-21s, and anti-aircraft guns.		1965, By	At least 99	
Grumman EA-6A "Electric Intruder"	Electronic warfare (EW)/Electronic countermeasures (ECW)	Grumman	Converted Grumman A-6 Intruder designed for the United States Marine Corps, designed to provide a new ECM platform to replace the EF-10B Skyknights and AD Skyraiders; it served with the USMC during the Vietnam War in 1966. The last EA-6A had been retired by 1993. Later upgraded into the Grumman EA-6B Prowler.	Unknown	1965	27/28	
Boeing EC-135	Airborne Command Post, Airborne Launch Control Center, Tracking and Telemetry Platform, Airborne Radio Relay	Boeing	Developed from the Boeing C-135 Stratolifter. Replaced by the Boeing E-6 Mercury.	Unknown	1965	Unknown	
Grumman EA-6B Prowler	Electronic warfare/Attack aircraft	Grumman Northrop Grumman	Improved version of the Grumman EA-6A. Replaced by the EA-18G Growler in 2015 in the U.S. Navy and was retired in March 2019 with the U.S. Marine Corps. The EA-6B was the first U.S. aircraft specifically designed for electronic warfare.	1968	1971	170	
Lockheed EC-130	Psychological and Information Operations (EC-130J)	Lockheed Lockheed Martin	One of the many variants of the Lockheed C-130 Hercules.	Unknown	1975	7	
Boeing E-3 Sentry	Airborne early warning and control	Boeing Defense, Space & Security	Developed from the Boeing 707-320.	EC-137D: 9 February 1972 E-3: 25 May 1976	1977	68	
Boeing E-4	Airborne early warning and control	Boeing	Developed from the Boeing 747-200	1973	1974	4	
Windecker YE-5	Experimental stealth aircraft	Windecker Industries	Developed from Windecker Eagle	1973	Never	1	
Lockheed EC-130H Compass Call	Electronic warfare (EW), Suppression of Enemy Air Defenses (SEAD), offensive counter-information	Lockheed (airframe) BAE Systems (prime mission equipment); L3 Communications (aircraft integration and depot maintenance)	One of the many variants of the Lockheed C-130 Hercules.	Unknown	1983	14	
General Dynamics–Grumman EF-111A Raven	Electronic warfare	General Dynamics, conversion by Grumman	Developed from the General Dynamics F-111 Aardvark.	1977	1983	42	
Boeing E-6 Mercury/Hermes	Airborne command and control	Boeing	Developed from the Boeing 707-300; utilizes TACAMO; planned to be replaced by the TACAMO Recapitalization Program (E-XX); replaced the EC-135.	1987	1989	16	
Northrop Grumman E-8 Joint STARS	Airborne Battle Management and ISTAR	Northrop Grumman	Developed from the Boeing 707	1988	1991	17	
E-9A Widget			A United States Air Force De Havilland Canada Dash 8 range control aircraft that ensures that the overwater military ranges in the Gulf of Mexico are clear of civilian boats and aircraft during live fire tests of air-launched missiles and other hazardous military activities. The 82nd Aerial Targets Squadron located at Tyndall AFB, has the only E-9A aircraft in the Department of Defense inventory.	Unknown	1988 (IOC)	2	
Northrop Grumman E-10 MC2A	Airborne early warning and control	Northrop Grumman / Boeing Integrated Defense Systems	Based on the Boeing 767-400ER, project later cancelled.	Never	Never	0	
Boeing E-767	Airborne early warning and control	Boeing Integrated Defense Systems	Boeing E-3 Sentry's surveillance radar and air control system installed on a Boeing 767-200; used by the Japan Air Self-Defense Force.	1994 (without rotodome); 1996 (with rotodome)	2000	4	
Boeing E-7 Wedgetail	Airborne early warning and control	Boeing Defense, Space & Security	Based on the Boeing 737 Next Generation. Also known as the E-737 or Boeing 737 AEW&C	2004	2012	14	
Boeing EA-18G Growler	Electronic warfare aircraft	Boeing	Electronic warfare version of the Boeing F/A-18E/F Super Hornet. It's built to replace aging EA-6B Prowlers. It also retains the Super Hornets' multi-mission and SEAD capabilities.	2006	2009	172 as of October 2021	
EA-37B Compass Call	Electronic warfare aircraft	Gulfstream Aerospace (airframe) L3Harris Technologies & BAE Systems (mission systems)	USAF Gulfstream G550 fitted for Electronic Warfare to replace existing EC-130H Compass Call aircraft. Previously known as EC-37B, on November 14, 2023, Air Combat Command redesignated the platform as EA-37B to better identify its mission of finding and attacking enemy land or sea targets.	Unknown	Unknown	5 out of 10 planned	
Lockheed EP-3	Signals Intelligence (SIGINT)	Lockheed Corporation	Electronic signals reconnaissance variant of the Lockheed P-3 Orion.	Unknown	1960s, late -early 1970s	12	
