= Skybaby =

Skybaby or Sky baby may refer to:

- Fisher FP-606 Sky Baby, ultralight aircraft
- Skyhigh Skybaby, ultralight aircraft
- Stits SA-2A Sky Baby 1952 home built aircraft considered one of the world's smallest.
- Name for fans of The Elder Scrolls V: Skyrim.
