= Battlefield UAVs of the United States =

The usefulness of UAVs for aerial reconnaissance was demonstrated to the United States in the Vietnam War. At the same time, early steps were being taken to use them in active combat at sea and on land, but unmanned combat aerial vehicles would not come into their own until the 1980s.

== History ==
UAVs, such as the Northrop Falconer, had been developed for battlefield reconnaissance beginning in the 1950s, but these machines saw little or no combat service. Israelis pioneered the operational use of battlefield UAVs in the early 1980s, during their operations in southern Lebanon. Very few of the technologies they used were all that new, but the Israelis finally achieved the proper formula for operational success, using their battlefield UAVs to help destroy Syrian surface-to-air missile sites and assist in other combat operations.

With the successes in southern Lebanon, international interest in battlefield UAVs picked up significantly. During the 1980s, all the major military powers and many of the minor ones acquired a battlefield UAV capability, and continue to expand that capability. These battlefield UAVs fall into two broad categories, which can be designated for convenience as "combat surveillance" and "tactical reconnaissance" UAVs.

== Combat surveillance UAV ==
The function of a combat surveillance UAV is to observe events on a battlefield in real-time, orbiting over the battle area and relaying intelligence to a ground control station. They are generally powered by small rotary or two-stroke piston "chain saw" engines.

They are directed by an autopilot system with RC backup. The autopilot directs the aircraft from sets of waypoints programmed in before takeoff. The flight-plan is set up by displaying a map on a workstation, clicking on the desired map coordinates with a mouse or directly on to a touch-screen, and then uploading the flight-plan into the UAV. Navigation is often verified by a GPS-INS navigation system. However, combat surveillance UAVs usually use the autopilot to get to the operating area, with the aircraft then operating by radio control to find targets of opportunity. The need to stay within radio range restricts combat surveillance UAVs to ranges within a line-of-sight of the transmitter. This is usually the determining factor in "range" specifications for such UAVs. For this reason, "endurance" is a more useful specification than "range".

The UAV sensors are generally housed in a turret underneath the aircraft, and almost always feature day-night imagers. The turret may also include a laser designator to allow the UAV to mark targets for smart weapons. Other specialized payloads, such as SIGINT packages, or new lightweight synthetic aperture radar (SAR)sensors with all-weather imaging capability, are now being fielded as well.

The larger combat surveillance UAVs have landing gear, usually fixed, and can take off and land on an unimproved airstrip, with an arresting hook to snag a cable for short landings. Such UAVs may also be launched by a RATO booster, and recovered by parachute, parasail, or by flying into a net. Smaller combat surveillance UAVs may be launched with a pneumatic, hydraulic, or electric catapult, with the very smallest launched by an elastic-bungee catapult.

== Tactical reconnaissance UAV ==
The tactical reconnaissance UAV is usually larger, jet powered, with longer range and higher speed. Like a combat surveillance UAV, it has an autopilot with radio control backup, but it relies more on the autopilot than on radio control, since its primary mission is to fly over predesignated targets out of line of sight, take pictures, and then come home. The tactical reconnaissance UAV will usually not loiter over the battle area, and real-time intelligence is less essential.

A tactical reconnaissance UAV usually carries day-night reconnaissance cameras, rather than a sensor turret, though SAR can be carried as well. They are generally launched by RATO booster and recovered by parachute, though they can be launched from aircraft as well.

The dividing line between combat surveillance and tactical reconnaissance UAVs, as well as between them and other classes of UAVs, is fuzzy. Some types of UAV may be usable for both missions. The distinction between a combat surveillance UAV and some kinds of "endurance" UAVs, discussed later, and between a tactical reconnaissance and a strategic reconnaissance UAV, as discussed earlier, is also very thin.

There are also many variations on themes. The smaller combat surveillance UAVs, in the size range of a large hobbyist RC model plane and used to support military forces at the brigade or battalion level, are sometimes called "mini-UAVs", and their low cost makes them particularly suitable for "expendable" missions. Such expendable missions might involve carrying a jammer payload into an enemy's operational area to disrupt radar and communications, or even being fitted with a radar seeker and a warhead to attack enemy radars. Such an "attack drone" or "harassment UAV" now becomes difficult to logically distinguish from a cruise missile.

== The DASH Helicopter Drones / SEAMOS ==
The first operational battlefield UAV developed by the US military was for antisubmarine warfare (ASW). In the early 1960s, the US Navy obtained a small "Drone Anti-Submarine Helicopter" (DASH) Gyrodyne QH-50 that could fly off a frigate or destroyer to carry homing torpedoes or nuclear depth charges for attacks on enemy submarines that were out of range of the ship's other weapons. This was a relatively simple requirement, involving a neatly defined mission in a combat environment where presumably nobody would usually be shooting back at the drone, and it seemed achievable with the technology of the time.

Gyrodyne Company of Long Island, New York, was awarded the contract to build DASH, and based the design on a one-man helicopter the company had already developed, the "YRON-1". The initial DASH demonstration prototype, designated the "DSN-1", used a Porsche flat-four piston engine with 54 kW (72 hp), with nine such prototypes built. Initial flights were in the summer of 1961, at first with a pilot on board, leading up to an unpiloted helicopter flight in August 1961.

A second-generation prototype, the "DSN-2", was powered by two Porsche engines, each with 64.5 kW (86.5 hp). Three such drones were built, and then led to the production DASH, the "DSN-3", which was powered by a Boeing T50-BO-8A turboshaft engine with 225 kW (300 shp). First flight of the DSN-3 was also in the summer of 1961.

The US military services adopted a common aircraft designation scheme in 1962, and the DASH variants were given new designations. The DSN-1 became the "QH-50A", the DSN-2 became the "QH-50B", and the DSN-3 became the "QH-50C". The general configuration of all three of the DASH prototype variants was similar, though the QH-50C was scaled up, with an empty weight almost twice that of the QH-50A. The QH-50C was an ugly little machine that was reminiscent of an insect. It had a frame made of steel tubing, with all machinery directly accessible, and stood on twin skids, with one or two homing torpedoes or nuclear depth charges carried between the skids. It had a coaxial rotor system and a dropdown inverted vee tail.

The QH-50C had a height of 2.96 metres (9 feet 9 inches), a rotor diameter of 6.1 metres (20 feet), and an empty weight of 500 kilograms (1,100 pounds). It was guided solely by radio control, and had neither sensors nor autonomous navigation capability. Combat radius was a modest 54 kilometers (34 mi), which was adequate for its mission. Greater range would not have been very useful, as the DASH flew at low altitude and used a line-of-sight communications link, limiting its range in any case.

The US Navy originally ordered 900 QH-50Cs, but the type suffered from reliability problems, with a quarter of the first batch of 100 lost in crashes. The order was cut to a little over 500, with final production being the "QH-50D" variant, with an uprated engine providing 274 kW (365 shp), fiberglass rotors, and increased fuel capacity. The Japanese Maritime Self-Defense Force also bought a small batch of 16 DASHes in 1968.

The career of the DASH was undistinguished, but it was one of the first drones ever used in a strictly tactical environment, and pointed the way to the future. A small number of DASHes were apparently given reconnaissance gear and used for naval surveillance over the Gulf of Tonkin in 1966 in a project codenamed SNOOPY.

In the early 1970s the Air Force evaluated the QH-50D for a battlefield drone test program codenamed NITE GAZELLE. NITE GAZELLE apparently experimented with using drones to drop bomblets and carry machine guns, but details are unclear, as are reports that the DASH was used in other evaluations as a countermeasures platform.

In the 1980s, Aerodyne corporation attempted to sell an updated version of the DASH, designated the "CH-84 Pegasus", with an Allison 250-C20F turboshaft engine and updated electronics. While it appears the Pegasus was not a success, the DASH was resurrected a second time in the 1990s by the German Dornier company, now part of Daimler Chrysler, for the "SEAMOS" naval UAV.

== SEAMOS ==
SEAMOS owed much to DASH, and in fact a modified QH-50D was used as the SEAMOS demonstrator prototype. Like the original DASH, SEAMOS was a coaxial-rotor drone helicopter with twin landing skids, though it was unsurprisingly a more refined system, and in particular even had a real fuselage. SEAMOS was powered by an Allison 250-C20W turboshaft engine with 315 kW (420 shp).

SEAMOS flight tests were performed with the technology demonstrator in 1991, leading to a production contract in 1996 and flight tests of a true prototype in 1999. Service introduction was expected in 2005, but the program was cancelled in early 2003, SEAMOS having been judged "overdesigned and too expensive". The German government put out a request for an off-the-shelf solution, sensibly stating specifications in line with a machine that they could afford. The EADS Orka-1200, discussed later, is the prime candidate.

== EXDRONE ==
During the Gulf War, the US Marines also used about 60 cheap battlefield mini-UAVs, the "BQM-147 Exdrone (Expendable Drone)", that were fitted with simple TV camera payloads for battlefield reconnaissance.

The Exdrone was built by BAI Aerosystems of Maryland. It was mostly made of styrofoam, balsa wood, and plastics, and was powered by a chainsaw engine. It was a "symmetrical delta", meaning it didn't matter if it flew upside-down, allowing it to offer some protection to its payload when necessary. A later version was the BQM-147 Dragon.

== BRAVE 200 ==
While the Army was floundering with the Aquila, the Air Force was going through its own struggles with the tactical UAV concept. Beginning in the mid-1970s, the USAF Flight Dynamics Laboratory, working with Teledyne Ryan, developed a piston-powered tactical UAV designated the "XBQM-26 Teleplane". A total of 23 were built, in 13 different configurations. It is unclear if there was ever any intent to adopt the XBQM-26 for operational service, since the program had a strongly experimental flavor, with the different configurations used to evaluate a wide range of possibilities for tactical UAV operations. The program ended in the mid-1980s.

However, the Air Force did conduct a program to obtain an operational tactical UAV, the "Boeing Robotic Air Vehicle (BRAVE) 200". The BRAVE 200 was intended to be used as an antiradar attack drone, a jamming platform, or for other expendable battlefield missions. The BRAVE 200 was a neat little canard machine, with a span of 2.57 metres (8 feet 5 inches), a length of 2.12 metres (6 feet 11 inches), and a launch weight of 120 kilograms (260 lb). It was powered by a 21 kW (28 hp) two-stroke, two-cylinder engine, driving a pusher propeller. The BRAVE 200 had an interesting launch scheme, with 15 of the UAVs stowed in a transport "box". A drone was shoved out of its cell in the box on an arm, and then launched by a RATO booster. It was recovered by parachute if the mission allowed it be recovered.

The BRAVE 200 effort began in 1983, when the company received a USAF contract to develop an anti-radar attack drone, under the designation "YCQM-121A Pave Tiger". 14 prototypes were flown in 1983 and 1984, but the program was cancelled in late 1984.

It did not stay cancelled. In 1987, the USAF awarded Boeing a contract to develop an improved version of the drone, designated the "YGCM-121B Seek Spinner", as a loitering antiradar attack drone. The YGCM-121B was generally similar to the YCQM but heavier, with a weight of 200 kilograms (440 lb). The Air Force also evaluated another variant in the series, designated the "CEM-138 Pave Cricket", with a jamming payload.

However, both Air Force programs were axed in 1989. Boeing continued to promote the BRAVE 200 to other customers, and also tried to sell a jet-powered drone, the "BRAVE 3000". The BRAVE 3000 resembled a small cruise missile with boxy fuselage, a straight wing that pivoted into launch configuration, cruciform tailfins, a belly fin forward of the wing, and an engine intake under the belly. The BRAVE 3000 also featured a container launch scheme, and had a launch weight of 285 kilograms (629 pounds) with RATO booster. A few prototypes were flown in the mid-1980s.

Nobody bought either the BRAVE 200 or the BRAVE 3000, and both projects were abandoned. Over a decade later, Boeing would return to the small UAV field by teaming up with the Insitu Group on the ScanEagle UAV, discussed later.

== Hunter / Sky Owl ==
With UAV efforts floundering, in the late 1980s the US Congress formed the "Joint Program Office (JPO)" to consolidate UAV programs. JPO was a branch of the Naval Air Systems Command, but obtained funding directly from the office of the Secretary of Defense, at the top of the US defense hierarchy. One of the first UAV programs begun by the JPO was the "Short Range UAV" program, which in 1988 selected the Hunter UAV, which was built by Israel Aircraft Industries (IAI) in cooperation with TRW.

The Hunter first flew in 1991. It had a general configuration not much different from the Pioneer, except that it was bigger and had twin engines, consisting of two 45 kW (60 hp) Moto-Guzzi piston engines arranged in on both ends of center fuselage in a "push-me-pull-you" configuration. It had a turret with a TV/FLIR imager mounted on the belly.

The original plan was to acquire 50 Hunter battlefield observation systems, with four aircraft and ground control gear in each system, for a total of US$1.6 billion. The aircraft was given the Army designation of "BQM-155A". Initial evaluation determined that the Hunter's range was inadequate, its data link was unsatisfactory, and the aircraft was too big to fit into the transport aircraft defined in the original specification.

Despite these deficiencies, a low rate initial production (LRIP) contract for seven systems at a price of US$171 million was placed in 1993. Further evaluation of the Hunter based on these seven systems demonstrated more shortcomings in the UAV's software, data link, and engine. As the Hunter's defects were gradually uncovered, price continued to rise, and by 1996 the Army was faced with paying over US$2 billion for 52 Hunter systems. Hunter was cancelled. By the time of its cancellation, 20 Hunters had been lost in crashes.

The cancellation of the Hunter program did not mean that the Hunters in service were discarded, and in fact they proved surprisingly useful and were even sent on operational missions. The Hunters were employed by the US Army, Air Force, and Navy on experimental programs; provided training in the development of operational concepts for the day when a more effective UAV system was available; and evaluated use of UAVs for communications relay and electronic warfare (EW) missions.

In the spring of 1999, eight surviving Hunters, redesignated "RQ-5A", were sent to Albania to support OPERATION ALLIED FORCE, the NATO air campaign against Serbia. The Hunters were flown out of Macedonia, and were able to provide real-time video to senior officers directing ALLIED FORCE, with the video relayed through a ground station, then through a satellite to the US, and finally distributed to end users. NATO commander Wesley Clark used the video feeds and on a few occasions contacted the Hunter operations team directly. The operations team also could adjust their missions in real time in response to inputs from the ALLIED FORCE air operations headquarters.

The Hunters flew 281 sorties during ALLIED FORCE. They spotted targets such as air defense radars, artillery, and missile launchers, and usually stayed on station during attacks to perform post-strike damage assessment. The Hunters were able to operate much lower than manned aircraft, which were restricted to minimum safe operating altitudes. Two Hunters were damaged and sent back to the US for repair, one flew into a mountain, and five were lost in action, apparently shot down. The operations team received six replacements.

In fact, the Hunter has proven so useful that the Army plans to buy more of them, suggesting that reports of its death in 1996 were greatly exaggerated. In 2002, the Army performed experiments with the Hunter in which it was used to drop "Brilliant Antiarmor Munitions (BATs)", a "smart" antitank glide weapon that features an acoustic / infrared seeker, as an experiment towards introduction of a more formal armed UAV system for the Army. A test drop of four BATs performed in early October 2002 scored three direct hits on armored vehicle targets, with one of the three blowing the turret off the tank it struck.

In late March 2003, a Hunter also performed drops of a BAT derivative named "Viper Strike" that was fitted with a laser seeker, with nine drops resulting in seven hits. The Army would like to evaluate other munitions, such as the Hellfire antitank missile, on the Hunter. The Air Force is supposed to provide fixed-wing battlefield air close support for the Army, but the Army has always wanted to have air close support assets of its own, and apparently sees the armed Hunter as a way of skirting around the USAF charter.

Hunters served in the US invasion of Iraq in the spring of 2003 and the subsequent occupation of the country. By the summer of 2004, the type had achieved a total of 30,000 flight hours in US Army service, not bad for an aircraft that was formally "canned". The Army is trying to find funds to buy 14 more Hunters. Since the original Moto-Guzzi engine fitted to the Hunter is no longer in production, this new batch will use a new heavy-fuel engine, and will also feature a number of other improvements.

== OUTRIDER ==
Although the Hunter proved very useful almost in spite of itself, the Army still needed a formal operational battlefield UAV system. In 1996, on the cancellation of the Hunter, the Army went through its third attempt to procure a battlefield UAV with the Alliant Techsystems Outrider.

The Outrider was based on the Mission Technologies "Hellfox" UAV, which had flown the year before. The Outrider was a relatively small battlefield UAV that featured an unusual "dual wing", meaning it was a biplane with the wings staggered and joined at the ends. It was powered by a four-cylinder piston engine driving a pusher propeller, had fixed landing gear, and a pancake-shaped data link antenna on its back.

The Outrider was another fiasco. The military demanded a wide range of major changes to the Hellfox, such changing airframe construction from composites to aluminum, and the effort never managed to converge to a solution. After continuous problems and a failure to meet specifications, the Outrider was cancelled in 1999, the same year it was formally designated the "RQ-6A".

While it is difficult to understand why the Army had such difficulty obtaining what would seem to be a relatively simple technology, part of the problem seems to be specsmanship. The Israelis were able to make use of battlefield UAVs quickly because they had simple requirements. The weather in the Middle East is generally hot, sunny, and clear, and the Israelis have a relatively fixed set of adversaries who mostly live right on their border.

In contrast, the US Army may be forced to operate almost anywhere and against anyone, meaning that a system that would be satisfactory to the Israelis would not be adequate for the US Army. The US Army necessarily had more demanding specifications. This was unavoidable, but it also opened the door to adding ever more specifications, a bureaucratic process known as "feature creep" that can squeeze the life out a project.

Along with over-specification, there seems to have been a degree of bumbling as well. The seeming simplicity of a UAV is misleading. Studies of the difficulties encountered in Army UAV programs indicate that participants tended to underestimate the complexity of a UAV system, starting out thinking that UAVs are little more than glorified RC model airplanes, and then were overwhelmed as problems mounted. On the other hand, some defense engineers approached UAVs with the same mindset as they would use for building a piloted aircraft, causing costs to skyrocket.

There also seems to have been problems from inter-service squabbling and Congressional micromanagement. After the development contract was awarded, the Pentagon decided that Outrider had to meet both Army and Navy requirements. This meant increasing the UAV's range by a factor of four, to allow ships to see targets over the horizon, and specifying an engine that ran on diesel fuel, not gasoline, which is too flammable to store on a naval vessel except when the need absolutely demands it. The engine effort was a fiasco.

US Navy UAV efforts seem to have gone better partly because of high-level interest in the project. The original Navy request that resulted in procurement of the Pioneer UAV was a personal initiative of Navy Undersecretary John Lehman. Not only does having such a prominent patron eliminate obstacles, it also encourages program officials to greater efforts, since they know their actions have high-level visibility. The Army efforts, in contrast, have often lacked patrons or high-level commitment.

However, the Navy has been criticized for becoming involved with programs like Outrider, changing the requirements drastically to fit their needs, and then walking off. In addition, the Navy's long and difficult search for an antiship missile target, discussed earlier, suggests that the Army has no particular copyright on bumbling. Further consideration of the matter leads into a tangle of bureaucracy best avoided.

== See also ==
- Unmanned combat aerial vehicle
- History of unmanned aerial vehicles (UAVs)
- History of unmanned combat aerial vehicles (UCAVs)
- Low-cost Uncrewed Combat Attack System (LUCAS)
