= Lockheed Aequare =

Type of aircraft

Aequare

General information
- Type: Reconnaissance drone
- National origin: United States
- Manufacturer: Lockheed Missiles and Space Company
- Built by: Windecker Industries
- Primary user: United States Air Force
- Number built: 15-20

History
- First flight: 1975

The Lockheed Aequare (Latin: "to equalize") was an unmanned aerial vehicle developed by the Lockheed Missiles and Space Company for the United States Air Force. It was intended for launch from an F-4 Phantom II fighter-bomber, and would carry a remote sensor array and laser designator for use by the launching aircraft. The system was evaluated in the mid 1970s, but did not enter operational service.

== Design and development ==
Development of the Aequare was initiated in 1973 with the awarding of a contract from the Defense Advanced Research Projects Agency (DARPA) to the Lockheed Missiles and Space Company for the development of an expendable miniature air-launched remotely piloted vehicle (later known as unmanned aerial vehicle) for use by the United States Air Force (USAF) to find and designate targets for strike aircraft in high-threat environments. The resulting aircraft, produced under subcontract by Windecker Industries, was equipped with a folding 7 ft 6 in (2.29 m) wing and a pusher ducted fan powered by a McCulloch MC-101 engine, and was intended to be launched from a SUU-42 flare dispenser, which would be released from a McDonnell Douglas F-4 Phantom II fighter-bomber at approximately 24,000 feet (7,300 m) and descend under parachute. Upon deployment of the main parachute, the Aequare would be released, starting its engine and flying under radio command guidance from a ground station, with imagery and telemetry transmitted through a datalink, with the launching aircraft acting as a relay using the CTU-2 datalink pod. The Aequare was equipped with cameras for aerial reconnaissance and also was fitted with a laser designator to allow the launching F-4, or other aircraft, to attack targets found by the UAV.

== Operational history ==
The Aequare first flew in mid-1975; between 15 and 20 prototype aircraft were produced. Following the end of the system's flight trials in March 1976, no production was undertaken.

A development of the Aequare, SAVIOR (Small Aerial Vehicle for Observation, Intelligence, and Reconnaissance), jointly produced by LMSC and Windecker, used the fuselage and engine of Aequare mated to a new fixed wing and landing gear configuration; it was used to research autopilot design and launch-and-recovery techniques for unmanned aerial vehicles.

== Specifications ==
Data from Parsch 2004

General characteristics

- Crew: None
- Length: 7 ft 5 in (2.26 m)
- Wingspan: 7 ft 6 in (2.29 m)
- Gross weight: 140 lb (64 kg)
- Powerplant: 1 × McCulloch MC-101 two-stroke single-cylinder engine, 12.5 hp (9.3 kW)

Performance

- Maximum speed: 115 mph (185 km/h, 100 kn)
- Range: 200 mi (320 km, 170 nmi)

== See also ==
Aircraft of comparable role, configuration, and era

- Lockheed MQM-105 Aquila
- Naval Research Laboratory Flyrt

Related lists

- List of military aircraft of the United States
- List of unmanned aerial vehicles
