= Lockheed MQM-105 Aquila =

1983 American small battlefield drone

MQM-105 Aquila
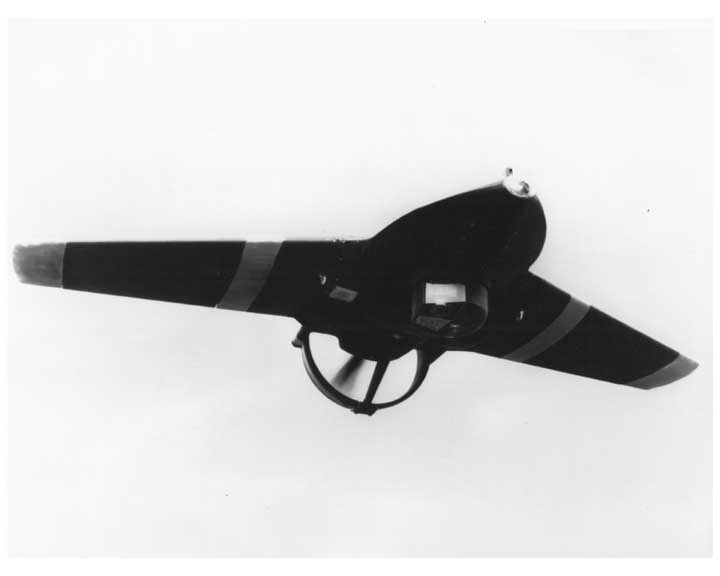

General information
- Type: Target-designator drone
- National origin: United States
- Manufacturer: Lockheed

History
- First flight: 1983

The Lockheed MQM-105 Aquila (Eagle) was the first small battlefield drone developed in the United States during the 1970s to act as a target designator for the US Army.

== Early history ==
The modern history of the Army's battlefield drone efforts began in 1972, when DARPA began the Remotely Piloted Aerial Observation/Designation System program which included PRAIRIE, Calare, and Aequare. The program was conceptualized in January 1973 in the joint U.S. Army and DARPA-funded project called RPAODS (Remotely Piloted Aerial Observer Designator System). PRAIRIE was a Philco Ford UAV with a TV camera and a laser target designator. PRAIRIE was able to target a truck and guide a laser-guided bomb to it. Calare and Aequare was delivered by Melpar and JHU/APL respectively. Melpar's prototype was launched from the top of the truck and landed on skids on a prepared runway. APL's prototype was a delta-wing aircraft, launched from a small cart and assisted by a bungee cord

DARPA does not have a charter to build operational systems, and passed the concept to the Army Aviation Systems Command, which decided to proceed with the next phase of development, a System Technology Demonstrator(STD). In 1975 the Army put the follow-on effort up for bid, and Lockheed was the low bidder. This phase of the program lasted until 1979 and demonstrated that the system had military potential and it could be developed at a reasonable risk. The RPV-STD effort created a non-stealthy tailless air vehicle with anhedral wing tips, that was launched by a pneumatic launcher, and was recovered in a trampoline-like structure which held a net. The system used an unsecured data link for tracking and data. From December 1975-November 1977 this RPV-STD system flew 149 flights, 35 by the contractor, and 114 by the Army team. At the completion of this phase the Aviation Systems Command worked with the user proponent which was the Artillery Branch to develop the requirements for a field-able system.

In 1979 the Aviation Systems Command issued a Full Scale Engineering Development Request for Proposal for a systems which would meet the Artillery's Required Operational Capability. Lockheed Missile and Space Division won the contract in late 1979. The contract provided for the delivery off 22 air vehicles, 4 Ground Control Stations, 3 Launch Systems, 3 Recovery Systems and support hardware. This target acquisition, designation and aerial reconnaissance (TADAR) program effort produced a stealthy tailless aircraft driven by a Herbrandson piston engine with a 26-inch (660 mm) pusher propeller. The Westinghouse payload was a television imager/laser designator in a turret in the belly. The laser designator was intended for use with the M712 Copperhead artillery ammunition and the AGM-114 Hellfire missile. Development of a Ford Aerospace FLIR/laser designator payload began in 1984. Secure communications with the air vehicle was provided by a joint Army/Air Force program called Modular Integrated Communications/Navigational System (MICNS). On the nose of the air vehicle was a Near IR source which interacted with the Recovery System to automatically recover the aircraft after the flight.

The Aquila was hydraulically launched by an All American Engineering catapult mounted on a 5-ton truck. The hydraulically operated Recovery System, built by Dornier, consisted of a vertical net held by a frame work shaped like an inverted "h" into which the air vehicle would automatically fly. This was also mounted on a 5-ton truck. For testing and training an emergency parachute backup recovery system was provided. The necessity for these systems was the specified requirement to be able to enter a small clearing surrounded by 50-foot (15 m) trees and to be able to quickly launch a mission. Then at the end of a mission, land in a similar clearing surrounded with 50-foot (15 m) trees and quickly relocate the system after recovery.

The Ground Control System(GCS) was also mounted on the back of a 5-ton truck and provided room for three operators to control the mission. The air vehicle operator controlled the flight by entering in way-points and orbit parameters into the Norden computer. The payload operator used a joystick and console to control the pointing of the payload camera, the auto-tracking of the target, and the laser designating. The third operator was the mission commander which controlled the overall mission and maintained communications with his commander. The GCS was connected to the Remote Ground Terminal air vehicle tracking/communications antenna over a fiber optic cable.

Due to a delay in the MICNS secure data link, the first prototype system was produced in a Block I configuration. This system used the same air vehicle (minus the MICNS and automated landing system), the same hydraulic launcher, the same hydraulically operated recovery system, and same Ground Control System. This system used an unsecure interim data link and an alternate semi-automatic system to guide the air vehicle into the net. This system flew 17 flights during July–November 1982. This system was then assigned to an Army Early Operational Capability (EOC) unit from July 1983-July 1984 which conducted 20 flights. This EOC effort was created to provide the field with a system to identify any system weakness and provide the user to refine his tactics, techniques, and procedures for using the technology.

The complete MQM-105 began its contractor flight testing in December 1983 in Fort Huachuca, AZ. The Phase I of Government Developmental Testing II(DT II) began in May 1985 but testing was suspended in Sept 1985 because the system did not pass 21 of the 149 performance specifications. From October 1985-January 1986, Lockheed conducted a Test-Fix-Test effort at its own expense, and demonstrated that the major problems were solved. The DT IIA began in February 1986 and successfully completed in May 1986 although reliability problems continued to dog the system. The Government's Operational Test ran from October 1986 through March 1987. Although the Army requested that the system be put in production, the DOD review board cancelled the program in 1987. Aviation Week and Space Technology Magazine showed residual assets being used in US Army/South Korea war games in 1988.

The original fielding plans called for 780 air vehicles and 72 Launcher/Recovery System/Ground Control Station combinations.

There was turmoil throughout most of the Engineering Development of the Aquila Program both from internal and external causes. Within a year of the 1979 contract award, Congress zeroed the funding for the program as part of an overall budget reduction effort. Funding was restored in the following budget. Although the Aviation Systems Command was tasked with managing the system development, the Army Aviation Branch was generally hostile to the RPV in the fear that it would reduce the need for pilots and it competed for funds with the AHIP OH-58D program. Although the program was developed for the Artillery Branch, if the system had been fielded, it would have fallen under the Intelligence Branch. Lockheed moved the development effort from California to Austin, Texas in 1984 which broke up the contractor's development team. The Army moved the program management responsibilities from St. Louis, Mo. to Huntsville, AL in 1985 which broke up that team. To save program costs, the operational approach was modified from self-contained units to centralized launch and recovery with in-flight hand-offs between ground stations.

The Aquila, as with other small RPVs, always labored under the "It's just a model airplane, why does it cost so much?" syndrome. This led to a relatively low-cost airframe, with many single point failure points, carrying expensive payloads and data links.

When the Israelis demonstrated the real world usefulness of RPV's in the Beqaa Valley in 1982, U. S. support for the systems jumped. The Army began to push for new variants of Aquila such as Aquila Lite which attempted to redesign the ground systems to be carried on HMMWV's instead of 5 ton trucks. In addition, U.S Naval and Air Force interest in having RPV/UAV systems blossomed. Multiple Navy and Air Force systems were proposed. To attempt to prevent duplicate efforts, Congress proposed that the Air Force be responsible for air vehicle development and the Navy develop the payloads. Since the Aquila was so far along in its development it was allowed to continue outside of the proposed framework (somewhat as an orphan). All three services balked at Congress's proposal.

Lockheed also considered a variant of the Aquila named the "Altair" for international sales, but without the government production tooling the program was unaffordable.

== Specifications (Tactical) ==
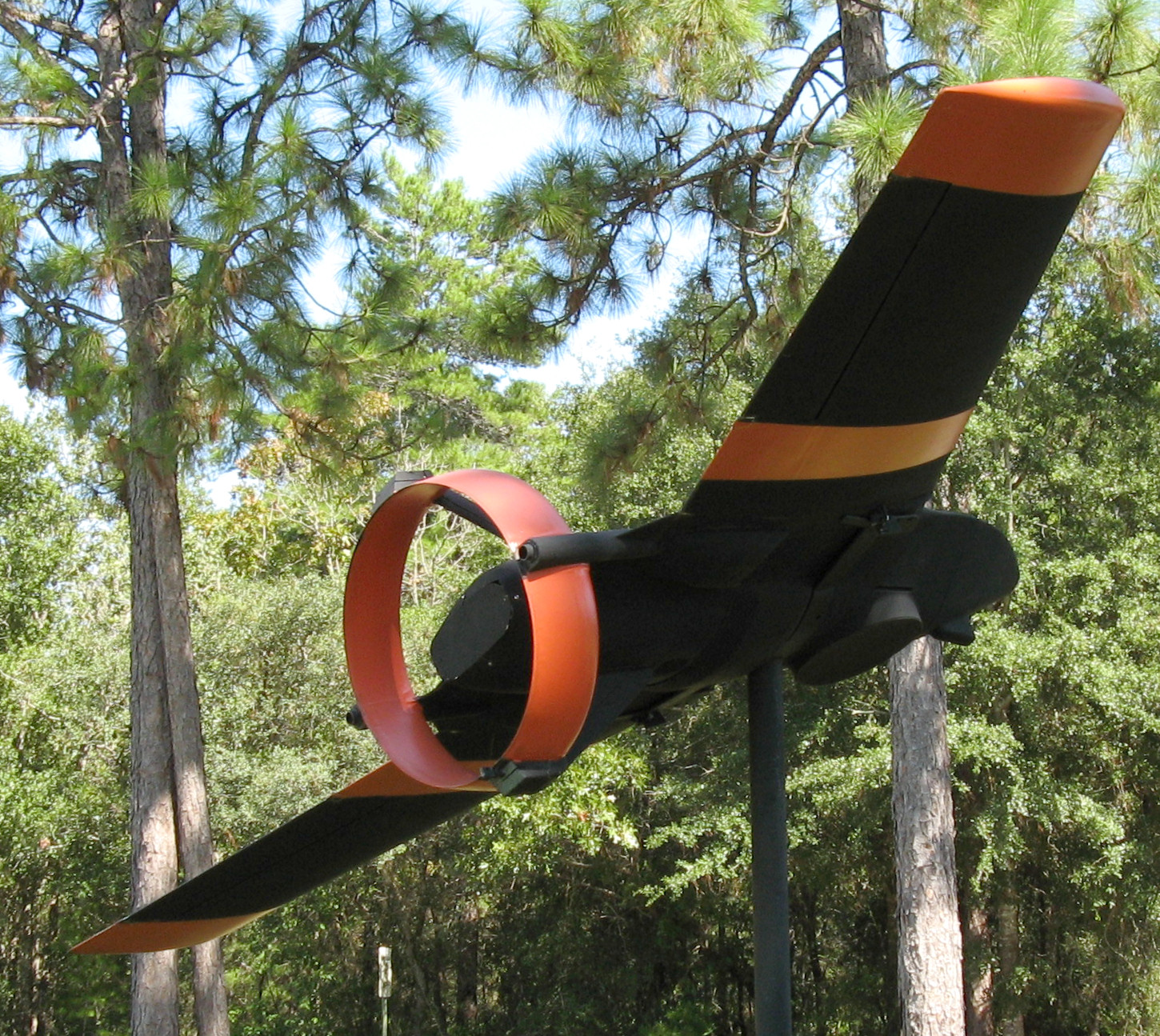
MQM-105 at the Air Force Armament Museum

General characteristics

- Crew: None
- Capacity: 115 lb (52 kg) payload
- Length: 6 ft 10 in (2.08 m)
- Wingspan: 12 ft 9.2 in (3.89 m)
- Gross weight: 263.2 lb (150 kg)
- Powerplant: 1 × Virgo M15 two-stroke piston engine , 24 hp (18 kW)

Performance

- Maximum speed: 130 mph (210 km/h, 110 kn)
- Endurance: 3 hours
- Service ceiling: 14,800 ft (4,500 m)

== See also ==
- HESA Shahed 136
