= Brilliant Anti-Tank =

Submunition round developed by Northrop Grumman

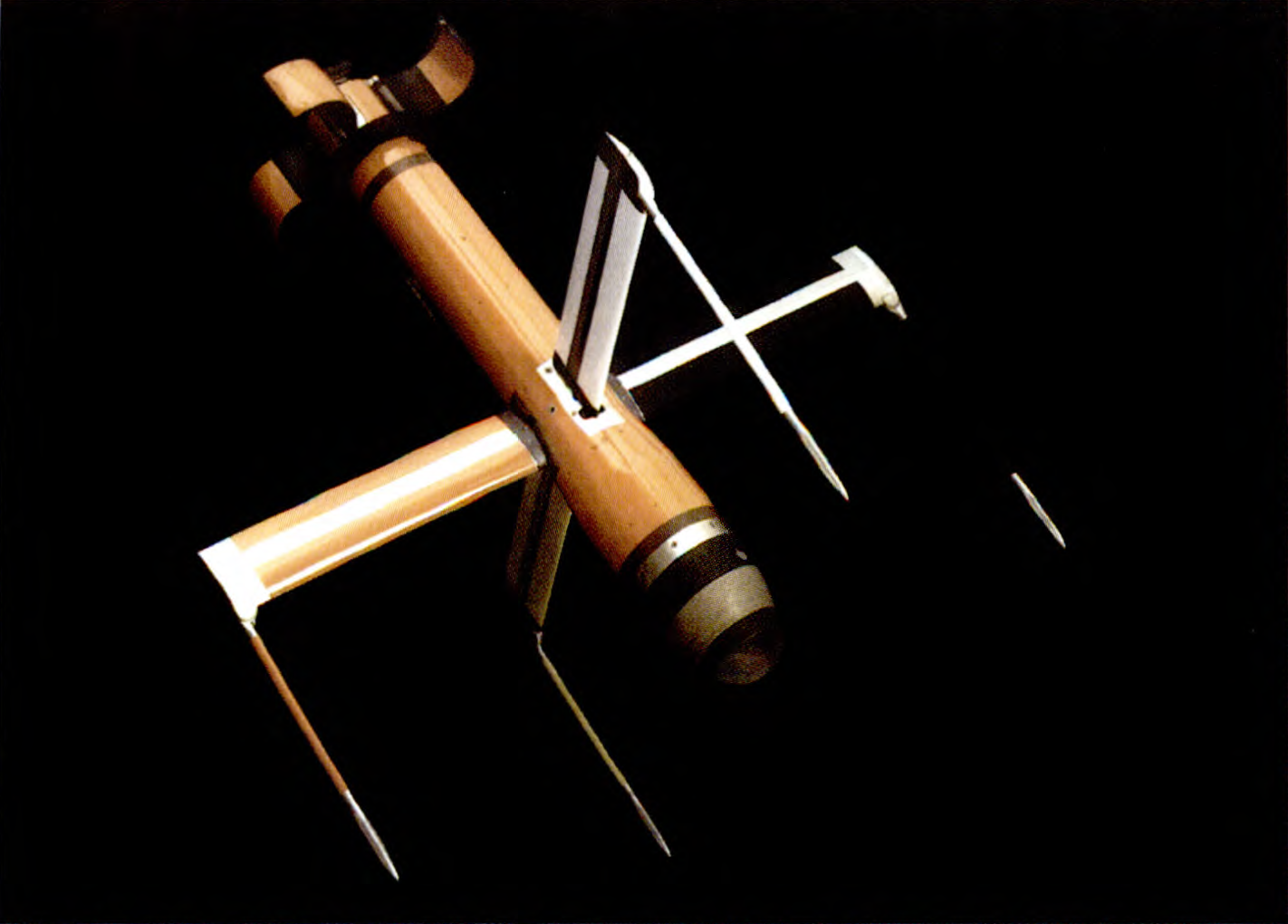
Brilliant Anti-Armor Submunition (BAT) in flight configuration

The Northrop Grumman Brilliant Anti-Tank (BAT) is a United States submunition round dispensed from a missile. It is capable of independently identifying and attacking armored vehicles. The BAT uses acoustic sensors to identify its intended targets, and an infrared homing (IR) terminal seeker to image and aim at the attack target.

13 BATs were intended to be carried on the MGM-164 ATACMS Block II missile fired from the M270 Multiple Launch Rocket System and related systems. Block I ATACMS missiles have a range of 128 km or more, but Block II was canceled in 2003.

== History ==
The BAT submunition project began in 1984. It was an outgrowth of the Assault Breaker Project. This broad-ranging Cold War project’s objective was to develop advanced weapon systems to destroy a Soviet armored assault across border between West Germany and East Germany. An early successful weapon system was the Hellfire Missile. The Hellfire was classified as a smart weapon because of the intelligence in the guidance system.

An obvious shortcoming of the Hellfire is that the launch platform must acquire the target and in so doing expose itself. The concept of the BAT was to be able to project the submunitions deep behind enemy lines and autonomously attack high-value armored formations before they could engage NATO forces. As originally envisioned, there would have been multiple platforms able to dispense the BAT. These include aircraft dispensers, artillery dispensers, and missile dispensers. The intelligence required of the BAT was much greater than the Hellfire and other weapon systems classified as smart, and the term "Brilliant" was applied.

Northrop was the prime contractor for the BAT. Much of the "brilliance" has to do with the submunitions' ability to distinguish high-value targets from low-value targets and strike them in known weak points.

== Use scenario ==
Designed to break up large mechanized formations, the M270 Multiple Launch Rocket System (MLRS) fires missiles carrying BAT submunitions to the targeted formation. The BAT submunitions are dispensed over the target area. The “wings”, tail fins, and retarders (parachutes) are deployed on each BAT. The four “wings” have directional microphones on each tip.

The BAT identifies high-value targets acoustically, using programs evolved from submarine warfare systems. The highest-value targets are selected, and the Raytheon Optical system in the nose images the designated target. Each target's weakest point is selected. The retarder is dropped, the rocket motor fires, and the munition is optically guided. A tandem-charge warhead is used to defeat any reactive armor present. In addition, thrust from the rocket motor provides kinetic energy to help destroy the target.

== Beyond development ==
With the Cold War over, the threat that instigated the Assault Breaker Project disappeared. Many of the weapon systems in development were abandoned as funds dried up. The only dispenser for the BAT is a missile launched from the MLRS, as the Air Force dropped plans for aircraft dispensers. Northrop was fond of the idea of using the B-2 Spirit stealth bomber to drop BATs anywhere in the world, but the unmodified BAT became a system that doesn't address a current threat. The current stockpiles are zero-funded, with neither further acquisition funds nor maintenance funds for existing stocks. Around 1,100 BATs were built.

== Viper Strike ==
Around 2003, Northrop used adapted BAT missiles as the basis for the GBU-44/B Viper Strike weapons system for use on UAVs.

== See also ==
- GBU-44/B Viper Strike – (United States)
