= IAI RQ-5 Hunter =

Reconnaissance UAV

RQ-5 Hunter
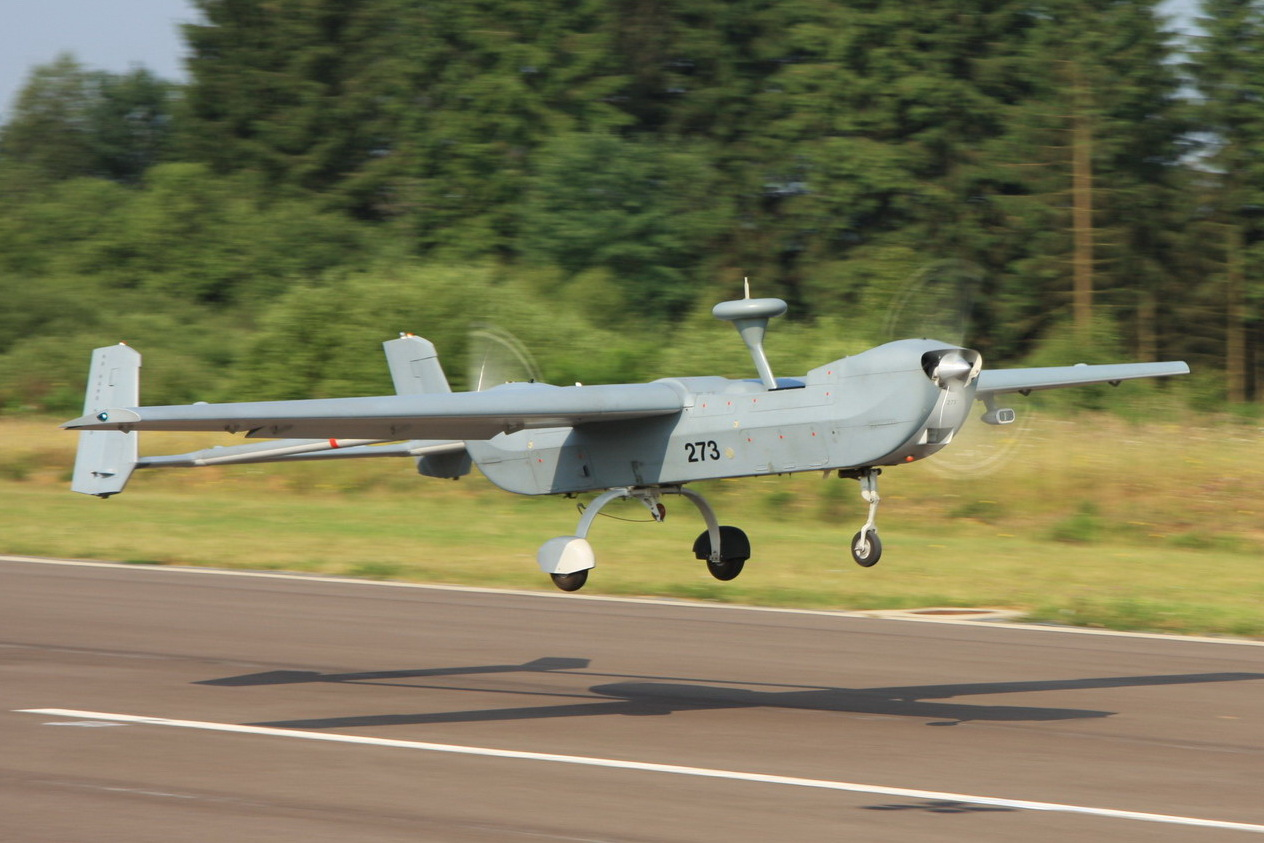
- B-Hunter of the Belgian Air Component

General information
- Type: Unmanned surveillance and reconnaissance aerial vehicle
- National origin: Israel
- Manufacturer: TRW (acquired by Northrop Grumman in 2002) / IAI
- Primary user: United States Army
- Number built: at least 20

History
- Introduction date: 1995
- Retired: 2015

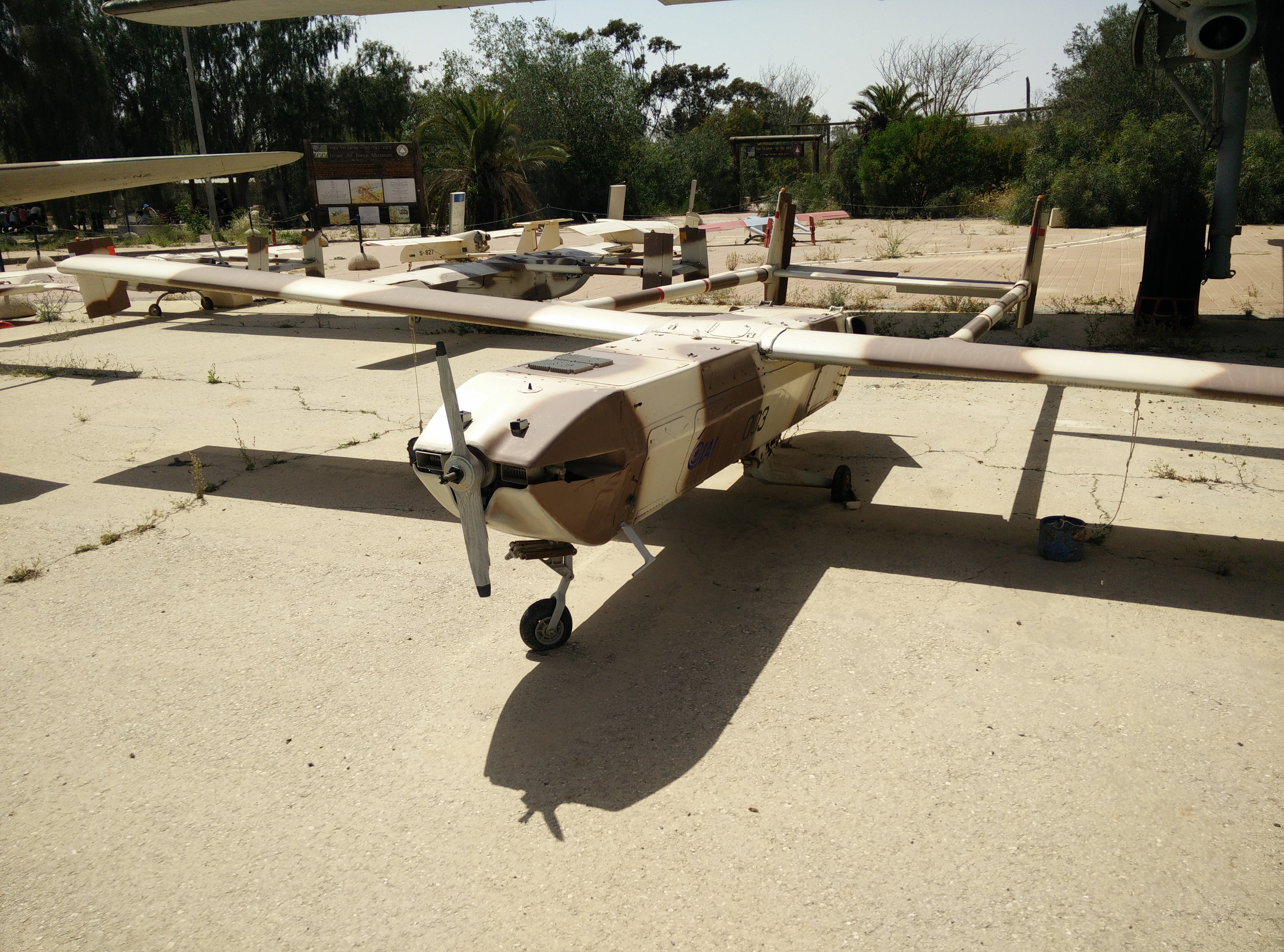
An RQ-5 Hunter at the UAVs area in Hatzerim Israeli Air Force Museum

The IAI RQ-5 Hunter is an unmanned aerial vehicle (UAV) originally intended to serve as the United States Army's Short Range UAV system for division and corps commanders. It took off and landed (using arresting gear) on runways. It used a gimbaled EO/IR sensor to relay its video in real time via a second airborne Hunter over a C-band line-of-sight data link. The RQ-5 is based on the Hunter UAV that was developed by Israel Aerospace Industries.

== Design and development ==
System acquisition and training started in 1994 but production was cancelled in 1996 due to concerns over program mismanagement. Seven low rate initial production (LRIP) systems of eight aircraft each were acquired, four of which remained in service: one for training and three for doctrine development, exercise, and contingency support. Hunter was to be replaced by the RQ-7 Shadow, but instead of being replaced, the Army kept both systems in operation because the Hunter had significantly larger payload, range, and time-on-station capabilities than the Shadow.

== Operational history ==
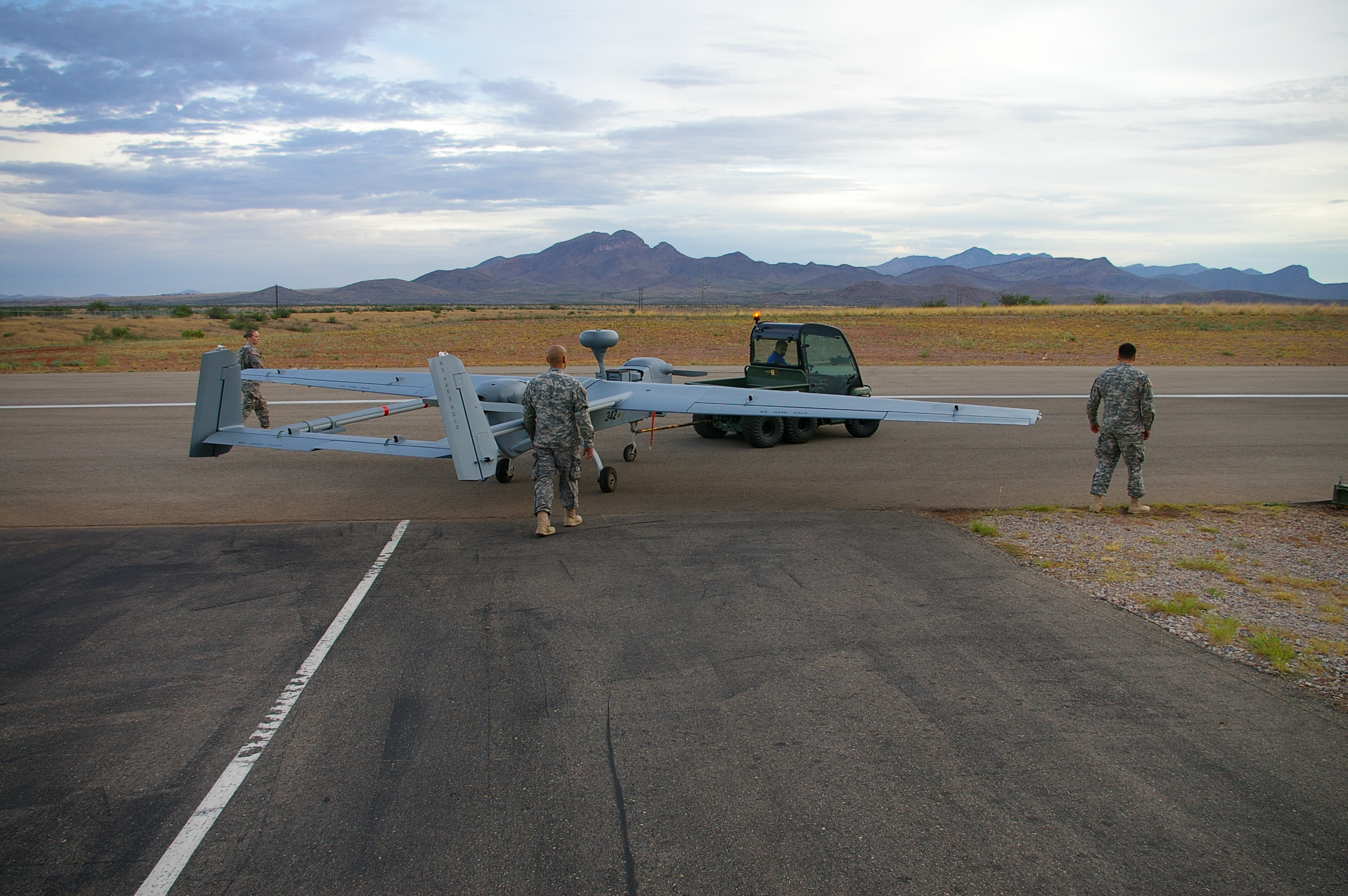
MQ-5B Hunter

In 1995, A Company, 15th Military Intelligence Battalion (Aerial Exploitation) out of Fort Hood, Texas was the first U.S. Army field unit equipped with the Hunter. A Company conducted multiple successful training rotations to the National Training Center. Then in March 1999, they were deployed to the Republic of Macedonia in support of NATO operations in Kosovo where one was shot down by a Yugoslav Mil Mi-8 side 7.62x54mmR machine gun. During the 78 days of the NATO-led campaign, at least seven Hunter UAVs were lost. During the seven-month operation, the Hunter was flown for over 4,000 hours. Significant operational success in Kosovo led to a resumption of production and technical improvements. Hunter was used in Iraq and other military operations since then. The system was also armed with the Viper Strike munitions.

The Army's Unmanned Aircraft Systems Training Battalion at Fort Huachuca, AZ trained soldiers and civilians in the operation and maintenance of the Hunter UAV.

In 2004, the United States Department of Homeland Security, Bureau of Customs and Border Protection, Office of Air and Marine utilized the Hunter under a trial program for border patrol duties. During this program, the Hunter flew 329 flight hours, resulting in 556 detections.

A version armed with the Northrop Grumman GBU-44/B Viper Strike weapon system is known as the MQ-5A/B.

As of October 2012, the U.S. Army had 20 MQ-5B Hunters in service. Retirement of the Hunter was expected to be completed in 2013, but Northrop was awarded a support contract for the Hunter in January 2013, extending its missions into 2014.

On 7 October 2013, the U.S. Army opened a UAS facility at Vilseck Army Airfield in Germany. A letter of agreement between the U.S. and Germany allows the 7th Army Joint Multinational Training Command to use two ‘air bridges’ in the east of the country to train operators, marking the first time a U.S. UAV will fly beyond the limits of military training areas. Two unarmed MQ-5B Hunters were used solely for training drone operators.

From 1996 to January 2014, the MQ-5B Hunter unmanned aerial system flew over 100,000 hours with the U.S. Army.

On 14 March 2014, an RQ-5 was reported downed by a Crimean self-defense unit over Russian occupied Ukrainian territory, although Russia did not substantiate the claim and the Pentagon denies it operated such a vehicle over Crimea.

On 16 December 2015, the Hunter flew its final flight in Army service at Fort Hood. Since entering service in 1995, the aircraft had been deployed to the Balkans, Iraq, and Afghanistan. It was deployed to the Balkans four times between 1999 and 2002, accumulating 6,400 flight hours, and was the first Army UAS to cross into Iraq in 2003, proving itself for the first time in contingency operations as an intelligence asset to commanders at all levels and flying more hours than any other NATO reconnaissance platform. One capability unique to the Hunter was its relay mode that allowed one aircraft to control another at extended ranges or over terrain obstacles. By the end of Operation New Dawn in 2011, Hunters had flown more than 110,000 hours, its battlefield success clearly showing the value of UASs in combat operations as a direct result. While Army operators transitioned to the larger and more capable General Atomics MQ-1C Gray Eagle, the Hunter is being transferred to government-owned, contractor-operated units supporting operations overseas.

=== International use ===
In 1998, the Belgian Air Component purchased three B-Hunter UAV-systems, each consisting of six aircraft and two ground control stations. Operational from 2004 in the 80 UAV Squadron, 13 aircraft were in service in 2020. The last Hunter was withdrawn from Belgian service on 28 August 2020, to be replaced by the MQ-9B SkyGuardian.

== Operators ==
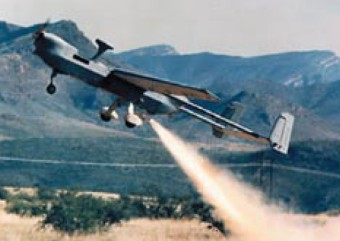
U.S. Army RQ-5 Hunter

- Belgium: Belgian Air Component
- Philippines: Philippine Air Force
- United States of America:
  - United States Army
  - United States Department of Homeland Security, Bureau of Customs and Border Protection, Office of Air and Marine

== Specifications ==
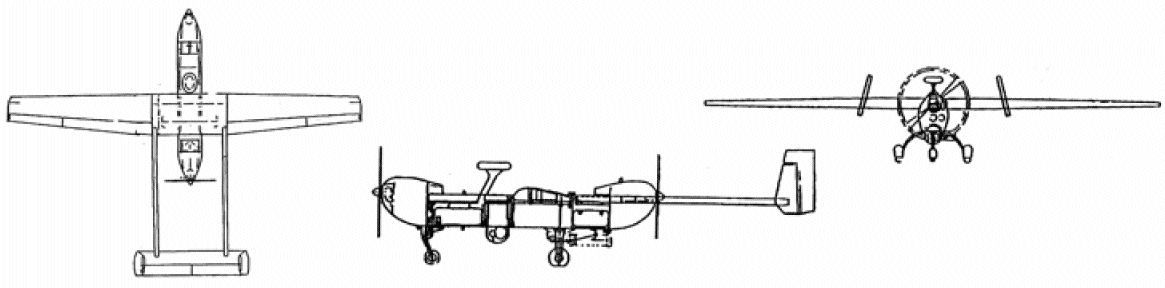

General characteristics

- Capacity: Payload: 90 kg (198 lb)
- Length: 7.01 m (22.99 ft)
- Wingspan: 10.57 m (34.67 ft)
- Height: 1.9 m (6.1 ft)
- Gross weight: 727 kg (1,603 lb)
- Max takeoff weight: 885 kg (1,950 lb)
- Fuel capacity: 300 Liters (79.3 gal)
- Powerplant: 2 × Twin Mercedes HFE Diesel, inline 3 cylinder, 800CC, 42 kW (56 hp) each

Performance

- Maximum speed: 170 km/h (100 mph, 90 kn)
- Cruise speed: 93–165 km/h (58–102 mph, 50–89 kn)
- Stall speed: 83 km/h (52 mph, 45 kn)
- Never exceed speed: 190 km/h (120 mph, 100 kn)
- Range: 125 km (78 mi, 67 nmi)
- Endurance: 21 Hours
- Service ceiling: 5,500 m (18,000 ft) MSL

== See also ==
- Unmanned combat air vehicle

Related lists

- List of active United States military aircraft
