= McCulloch MAC-101 =

- Type: Kart racing engine
- National origin: United States
- Manufacturer: McCulloch Motors Corporation
- Major applications: Kart racing; Ultralight aircraft

The McCulloch MAC-101, also called the MC-101 and MC101, is a two-stroke, single cylinder engine that was designed and produced by McCulloch Motors Corporation for kart racing use, being introduced in 1967. It was also used in the late 1970s and early 1980s as an ultralight aircraft engine.

== Design and development ==
All models in the MC-101 series have a bore of 2.280 in (5.791 cm), a stroke of 1.835 in (4.661 cm) and a displacement of 7.5 cu in (122.90 cc).

== Variants ==
MC-101
Introduced in 1967
MC-101A
Introduced in 1969
MC-101AA
Introduced in 1971
MC-101B
Introduced in 1974
MC-101C
Introduced in 1969
MC-101D
Introduced in 1971
MC-101M/C
Introduced in 1973

== Applications ==
Aircraft

- AmEagle American Eaglet
- Aviastroitel AC-4 Russia
- Birdman TL-1
- Eipper Quicksilver
- Farner HF Colibri 1 SL
- Hovey Whing Ding II
- Lockheed Aequare
- Skyhigh Skybaby
- UFM Easy Riser
- Volmer VJ-23 Swingwing

== Specifications (MC-101B) ==
Data from McCulloch Kart Engines, Bore and Stroke, MC101B Kart Engine Illustrated Parts List and Cliche

=== General characteristics ===
- Type: single cylinder, two-stroke engine
- Bore: 2.280 in (5.791 cm)
- Stroke: 1.835 in (4.661 cm)
- Displacement: 7.5 cu in (122.90 cc)

=== Components ===
- Fuel system: carburetor
- Oil system: pre-mixed
- Cooling system: air-cooled

=== Performance ===
- Power output: 12.5 hp (9 kW) at 9000 rpm
