= Skyhigh Skybaby =

American ultralight aircraft

Skybaby

General information
- Type: Ultralight aircraft
- National origin: United States
- Manufacturer: Skyhigh Ultralights Inc
- Status: Production completed

History
- Introduction date: 1983

The Skyhigh Skybaby is an American ultralight aircraft that was designed and produced by Skyhigh Ultralights Inc, introduced in 1983. The aircraft was supplied in the form of plans for amateur construction.

== Design and development ==
The aircraft was designed to comply with the US FAR 103 Ultralight Vehicles rules, including the category's maximum empty weight of 254 lb (115 kg). The aircraft has a standard empty weight of 155 lb (70 kg). It features a cable-braced high-wing, a single-seat, open cockpit, conventional landing gear and a single engine in pusher configuration.

The aircraft is made from wood. The fuselage is built around a wooden torsion box that is foam-filled for stiffness. The tailboom is a 3 in (8 cm) diameter 6061-T6 aluminum tube. Its 32 ft (9.8 m) span wing is constructed from Douglas fir spars and wing ribs, covered with doped aircraft fabric. The wing features half-span ailerons and cable-bracing from a single kingpost. The pilot is accommodated in the open cockpit on a fixed seat. There is no windshield. The landing gear is bungee suspended and the tail wheel is steerable.

Being a plans-built aircraft a variety of engines have been installed, including the McCulloch MAC-101 powerplant of 12.5 hp (9 kW) and the Yamaha KT-100 go-cart engine of 15 hp (11 kW).

== Specifications (Skybaby) ==
Data from Cliche and the Virtual Ultralight Museum

General characteristics

- Crew: one
- Length: 17 ft (5.2 m)
- Wingspan: 32 ft (9.8 m)
- Height: 6 ft (1.8 m)
- Wing area: 128 sq ft (11.9 m^{2})
- Empty weight: 155 lb (70 kg)
- Gross weight: 360 lb (163 kg)
- Fuel capacity: 3 U.S. gallons (11 L; 2.5 imp gal)
- Powerplant: 1 × McCulloch MAC-101 , 12.5 hp (9.3 kW)

Performance

- Maximum speed: 40 mph (64 km/h, 35 kn)
- Cruise speed: 35 mph (56 km/h, 30 kn)
- Stall speed: 24 mph (39 km/h, 21 kn)
- Never exceed speed: 50 mph (80 km/h, 43 kn)
- g limits: +5/-3
- Maximum glide ratio: 9:1
- Rate of climb: 225 ft/min (1.14 m/s)
