= Windecker Eagle =

American light aircraft

Eagle
- Model of a Windecker Eagle at Texas Aviation Hall of Fame.

General information
- Type: Light aircraft
- National origin: United States
- Manufacturer: Windecker Industries
- Designer: Leo and Fairfax Windecker
- Number built: Two prototypes and six production aircraft

History
- First flight: 7 October 1967
- Variant: Windecker YE-5

The Eagle AC-7 Eagle 1 (USAF designation YE-5) is an aircraft that was manufactured by Windecker Industries. It was the first composite airplane (foam and fiberglass construction) to receive FAA certification in December 1969 at a reported development cost of US$20,000,000. The fiberglass process was named "Fibaloy" by Windecker.

== Design and development ==
The Eagle's fuselage was molded in two pieces that were joined down the middle. The first prototype had a fixed undercarriage but the second, known as the Eagle 1, had retractable tricycle gear. This aircraft first flew on 26 January 1969. One prototype spun in on testing.

Only eight Eagles were produced before production ended when the company ran out of money.

No Eagle had been flying for many years, but one was restored and flown in December 2015, by Don Atchison, Mike Moore and a team commissioned by Chinese entrepreneur Wei Hang. Wei Hang holds the rights and the type certificate and plans to produce the aircraft in China for Asian sales.

== Specifications ==
Data from Jane's All the World's Aircraft 1971–72

General characteristics

- Crew: 1
- Capacity: 3 passengers
- Length: 28 ft 6 in (8.7 m)
- Wingspan: 32 ft 0 in (9.75 m)
- Height: 9 ft 5 in (2.87 m)
- Wing area: 167 sq ft (15.5 m^{2})
- Aspect ratio: 5.82:1
- Airfoil: NACA 64_{2}415
- Empty weight: 2,150 lb (975 kg)
- Max takeoff weight: 3,400 lb (1,542 kg)
- Fuel capacity: 86 US gal (72 imp gal; 330 L)
- Powerplant: 1 × Continental IO-520C air-cooled flat-six engine, 285 hp (213 kW)
- Propellers: 2-bladed McCauley constant-speed propeller, 7 ft 0 in (2.13 m) diameter

Performance

- Maximum speed: 211 mph (340 km/h, 183 kn)
- Cruise speed: 204 mph (328 km/h, 177 kn)
- Stall speed: 66 mph (106 km/h, 57 kn) (flaps down)
- Never exceed speed: 260 mph (420 km/h, 230 kn)
- Range: 1,232 mi (1,983 km, 1,071 nmi)
- Service ceiling: 18,000 ft (5,500 m)
- Rate of climb: 1,220 ft/min (6.2 m/s)
- Takeoff run to 50 ft (15 m): 1,310 ft (399 m)
- Landing run from 50 ft (15 m): 1,330 ft (405 m)
