= Windecker YE-5 =

Experimental US stealth aircraft, 1973–1985

YE-5
- The YE-5A prototype

General information
- Type: Experimental stealth aircraft
- Manufacturer: Windecker Industries
- Primary user: United States Air Force
- Number built: 1

History
- First flight: 1973
- Retired: 1985
- Developed from: Windecker Eagle

The Windecker YE-5A was an experimental aircraft evaluated by the U.S. Air Force.

It was an all-composite construction aircraft, based on the commercial single-engine, low-wing Windecker Eagle. The YE-5A, delivered in 1973, was used in tests relating to the radar detectability (commonly known as 'stealth') of composite aircraft. A single YE-5A (serial number 73-1653) was built. The YE-5A composite airframe benefited from the U.S. Army project and was shown to be difficult to detect using radar; however other components, including the metal engine, could be seen on radar. The YE-5A was destroyed in a crash during a classified project in 1985, and was replaced by a modified conventional civilian model Windecker Eagle (N4196G), to complete the project. This aircraft is disassembled and in storage in the United States Army Aviation Museum at Fort Novosel, Alabama.

== Project CADDO ==
The U.S. Air Force tests were preceded by tests of a nearly similar prototype, which was delivered to the U.S. Army in 1972. This aircraft was code-named CADDO and tested at Aberdeen Proving Ground. The U.S. Army acquired another Eagle in 1974, which was used for ballistic tests. The U.S. Army Eagle was also used in tests for the U.S. Air Force. Ultimately this aircraft (N803WR) was destroyed by a tornado in 1980.

== Specifications (YE-5A) ==
General characteristics

- Crew: one pilot
- Length: 28 ft 8 in (8.7 m)
- Wingspan: 32 ft 0 in (9.8 m)
- Height: 9 ft 6 in (2.9 m)
- Empty weight: 2,150 lb (975 kg)
- Gross weight: 3,400 lb (1,500 kg)
- Powerplant: 1 × Lycoming I0-540-G , 290 hp (216 kW)

Performance

- Maximum speed: 210 mph (338 km/h, 180 kn) at sea level
- Cruise speed: 204 mph (328 km/h, 177 kn) 75% power
- Stall speed: 66 mph (106 km/h, 57 kn) flaps down
- Range: 1,100 mi (1,770 km, 960 nmi)
- Service ceiling: 18,000 ft (5,500 m)
- Rate of climb: 1,220 ft/min (6.0 m/s)
- Wing loading: 19.3 lb/sq ft (94 kg/m^{2})
- Power/mass: 0.09 hp/lb (0.14 kW/kg)
