= GBU-44/B Viper Strike =

Glide bomb

The GBU-44/B Viper Strike glide bomb was a GPS-aided laser-guided variant of the Northrop Grumman Brilliant Anti-Tank (BAT) munition which originally had a combination acoustic and infrared homing seeker. The system was initially intended for use from UAVs, and it was also integrated with the Lockheed AC-130 gunship, giving that aircraft a precision stand-off capability. The Viper Strike design is now owned by MBDA.

== History ==
=== Testing ===
The Viper Strike bomb first underwent testing in 2003. On March 29 and 30, Viper Strikes released from an RQ-5 Hunter UAV scored 7 out of 10 direct hits at White Sands Missile Range. The other three bombs missed their targets by a few feet but still inflicted measurable damage. The objective of the tests was to validate the concept of the Viper Strike and the operational feasibility of Viper Strike integrated on the Hunter UAV. In June 2005, Northrop integrated the Global Positioning System (GPS) into the laser-guided munition to provide highly accurate midcourse guidance.

This allowed the weapon to be launched from much greater altitude and standoff range. During tests, an unarmed weapon successfully acquired GPS data after dispensing from an aircraft and flew to pre-assigned GPS waypoints. Following an extended, nearly horizontal midcourse flight, the GPS-enhanced munition switched over to the semi-active laser seeker once it entered the target area to detect and track the laser-designated target. In January 2007, Viper Strikes successfully destroyed a series of moving and stationary targets in testing at the White Sands Missile Range. They were guided to their targets by the Hunter UAV's laser targeting system.

=== Deployment and continued tests ===
The GBU-44/B Viper Strike was first used in combat in September 2007. An MQ-5A Hunter UAV used one to kill two men who were setting up a roadside bomb.

On September 1, 2009, it was reported that the Hunter had successfully completed testing of the new GPS-guided Viper Strike weapons system and that it would soon deploy to theater.

On June 2, 2010, Northrop announced that the Viper Strike would be added to the United States Marine Corps' KC-130J refueling and cargo aircraft. Northrop delivered 65 munitions.

On December 12, 2011, MBDA Inc. purchased Northrop Grumman's Viper Strike munitions business located in Huntsville, Alabama.

On April 16, 2012, Viper Strike bombs scored multiple direct hits from a KC-130J Harvest Hawk at the Naval Air Warfare Center's China Lake, California Weapons Station. The munitions were dropped from the new pressurized "derringer door," which used a side door in the fuselage that enables the aircraft to launch and reload munitions while the aircraft remained pressurized.

In August 2012, MBDA announced that Viper Strike munitions scored direct hits against high speed vehicles during a two-day test. Viper Strikes successfully hit eight vehicles travelling at "extremely high speeds" in varying realistic scenarios.

The Viper Strike was phased out of SOCOM's inventory due to failure to achieve lethality performance.

== Launch platforms ==
- Current:
  - MQ-5 Hunter
  - KC-130J Harvest Hawk
  - AC-130W Stinger II

== Specifications ==
- Length: 0.9 m (36 in).
- Weight: 20 kg (42 lb).
- Diameter: 14 cm (5.5 in).
- Wingspan: 0.9 m (36 in).
- Glide ratio: 10:1
- Guidance: GPS-midcourse/terminal laser homing.
- Accuracy:< 1 m CEP.
- Range: 10+ km
- Warhead: 1.05 kg (2.3 lb) (HEAT).

== See also ==
- MAM (Smart Micro Munition) – (Turkey)
- AGM-176 Griffin – (United States)
- MQ-9 Reaper – (United States)
