= Windecker Industries =

American aircraft manufacturer based in Midland, Texas

Windecker Industries was an American aircraft manufacturer founded in 1962 as Windecker Research in Midland, Texas, by Leo Windecker, a dentist from Lake Jackson, Texas. In 1969, Windecker won Federal Aviation Administration (FAA) certification for the first all-composite (fiberglass epoxy resin) airplane, the single-engine Windecker Eagle.

== Early flight testing ==
Initial tests of composite wings on conventional airplane bodies began in 1958. Full FAA-supervised structural and flight testing began in 1961. In 1965, the company delivered a pair of composite wings to Cessna Aircraft Company, where they were subjected to structural and flight testing on a Cessna 182. Following promising initial results, the company built an experimental prototype of all-composite aircraft, the Windecker ACX-7 Eagle. Designed by Windecker and his wife, Dr. Fairfax Windecker (also a dentist), the aircraft was molded from a unidirectional fiberglass called Fibaloy. The fuselage was made in two halves in full-size female molds and joined on the centerline, much as a model kit might be assembled; the wings were full-core foam around a tubular fiberglass fuel tank, with wing skins formed in full-size female molds. The first prototype, constructed in the Midland research center, flew in October 1967.

== Eagle prototype ==
The certification Eagle prototype, incorporating retractable landing gear, crashed during spin testing for certification by the Federal Aviation Administration. After a redesign of the empennage, the Eagle AC-7 became the first composite airplane to receive FAA certification in December 1969. (A number of composite sailplane designs had been certified by the FAA as early as 1967). Windecker went on to produce six civilian Eagles in the early 1970s.

The Eagle was faster than the high-performance airplanes it was designed to compete against. With the same gross weight (3,400 lbs), wing area (176 sq ft) and engine (285 hp Continental IO-520) as its competitors, the Eagle prototype was emblazoned with silhouettes of a Beech Bonanza, Cessna 210, and Bellanca Viking, testimony to outrunning those airplanes in side-by-side tests. Windecker results of back-to-back flight tests showed the Eagle to be 10 mph (16 km/h) faster than the Beech V35 Bonanza, even though it was almost 11 inches wider and over 2 ft (0.61 m) longer. This speed advantage was due primarily to the optimum aerodynamic contours of the molded composite airframe. Additionally, the rigid sandwich-construction of its composite material skins prevented wrinkling and buckling under loads (a common occurrence with the thin aluminum skins of metal aircraft) which causes additional parasitic drag. The Eagle's low aspect ratio (of 5.82) rectangular wing, chosen for docile low-speed handling, probably reduced the Eagle's top speed. In 1970, a tapered, higher aspect ratio wing was under development that was calculated to add 10 miles per hour to the Eagle's maximum speed.

Because of its unfamiliarity with composites, the Federal Aviation Agency required the Eagle be 20% stronger than airplanes made with aluminum. This resulted in the Eagle being 100 lb (45 kg) heavier than its non-composite competitors. The retractable-gear Eagle is no heavier than current production fixed-gear composite airplanes, such as the Cirrus SR22 and Cessna (formerly Columbia) 350, both certified in 1998.

== Legacy ==
Windecker received 22 U.S. patents (and many more foreign patents) for all aspects of composite aircraft construction, most of which were assigned to the Dow Chemical Company, which funded the research. This technology was licensed to other firms such as Lockheed Martin, Northrop and the DeLorean Motor Company. In 2003, Leo Windecker was inducted into the Texas Aviation Hall of Fame, and he has been nominated for the National Aviation Hall of Fame.

Windecker Eagle N4197G (S/N 006) was donated to the National Air and Space Museum in 1985; it waits in storage, although it is planned to be put on display in the museum's new Udvar-Hazy facility at Dulles Airport. In October 2008 NASA officials inadvertently displayed the aircraft in the background of a number of photographs published on the web while they uncrated some of the Apollo heat shields.

Leo Windecker's Eagle, N4195G (S/N 004), is on display in the Lake Jackson Historical Society Museum in Lake Jackson, Texas. Windecker died on 13 February 2010, at Cedar Park, Texas.

In May 2000, the editors of Air & Space magazine selected the Windecker Eagle as the best aviation idea that was "ahead of its time".

== See also ==
- Windecker Eagle
- Windecker E-5
